= Sonsierra =

Spanish region that extends through the province of Alava, of La Rioja and Navarre

The Sonsierra de Navarra or simply Sonsierra is a Spanish geographical region that extends through the south of the province of Álava, north of La Rioja and southwest of Navarra. Currently most of the territory that comprised that region is known as Rioja Alavesa, although this has lost, by its current administrative delimitation, other municipalities that historically and geographically formed a whole one with the current wine region.

The name Sonsierra derives from the term subserra, already mentioned by the monks of the monastery of San Millán de la Cogolla in the 12th century.

For more than five centuries it formed a region within the merindad of Estella, of the ancient kingdom of Navarre that included the towns of San Vicente, Laguardia, Labraza, Viana and all their villages.

== Territorial division ==
Currently its enclaves belong to three different autonomous communities, but during medieval times and until the beginning of the Renaissance, they were a socio-geographical and even administrative unit, from its beginnings called "comunidad de villa y tierra" until its last dates under the denomination of principality of Viana.

=== Geographical demarcation ===
The geographical limits are clearly defined in the north by the Toloño or Cantabria mountain range, from the shells of Haro in the west to the Linares river in the east, in the south and west by the Ebro river, and in the east by the valley of the Linares river in the municipalities of Bargota and Lazagurría to the border between Viana and Mendavia, opposite the mouth of the Leza river in the Ebro.

== History ==
=== First written references ===
In 934 the Castilian Count Fernán González granted the document known as the "false vows of Fernán González". Within the extensive list of inhabited nuclei cited in the document, some place names that could be considered the first data that appear in a written document in medieval times about these lands can be found: "Tabuerneca, tota Subserra, tota Berrocia, Marangone, Punicastro, Moreta...". The term "Subserra" also appears in the document that contains the confirmation of the Charter of Nájera that King Alfonso VI of Castile made in the year 1076.

=== Community of "Villa y Tierra" ===
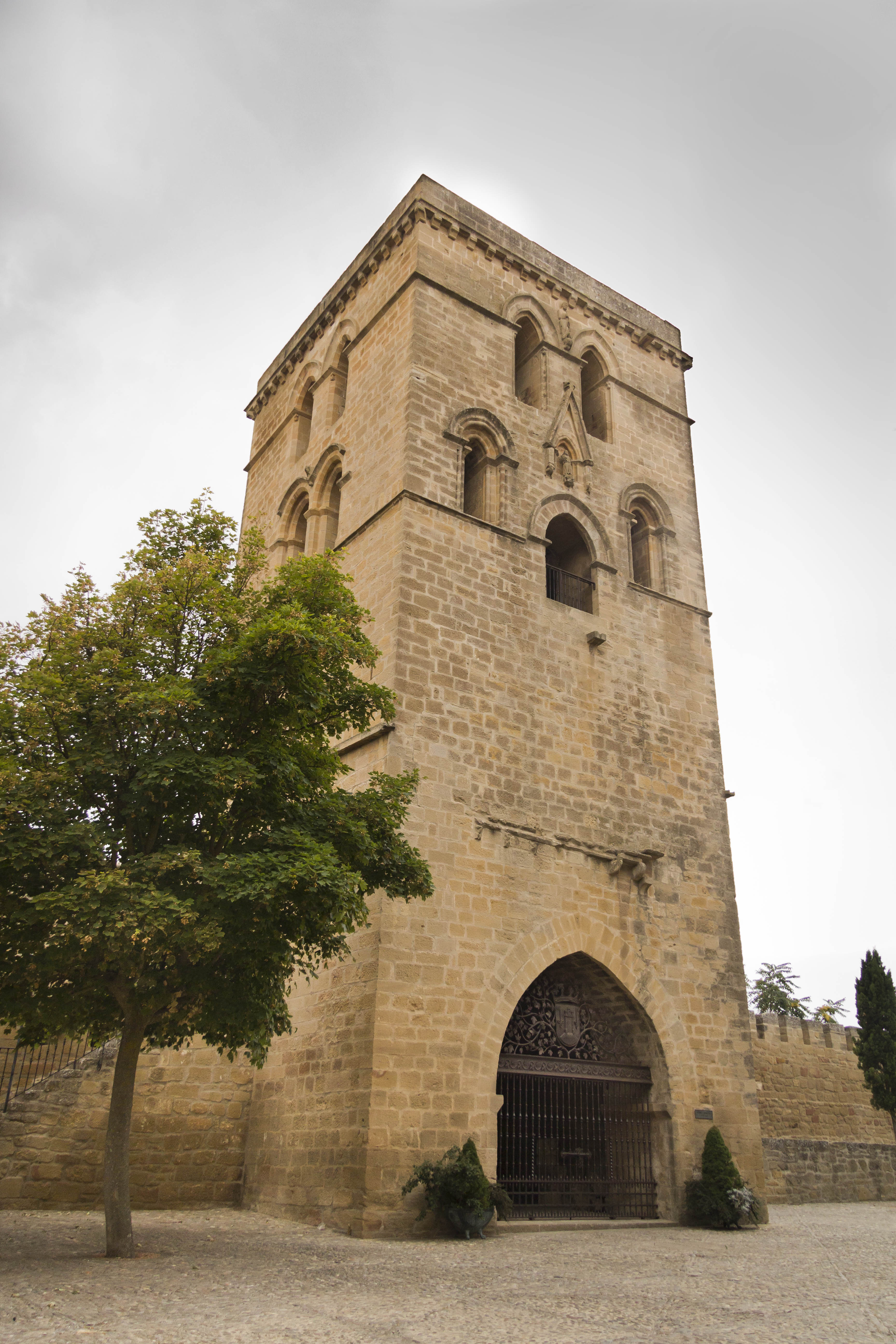
Abacial Tower in Laguardia.

In its beginnings, this region was called "La Guardia" since in 1164 Sancho VI of Navarre gave a charter to the town of Laguardia and marked its jurisdiction between Salinillas de Buradón, to the west, and the Soto de Íñigo Galíndez (today known as Soto Galindo in Viana), to the east. The northern and southern limits are marked by the Cantabria mountains and the Ebro River respectively. The conflicts of the Navarrese king with Castile meant that in a few years, the Ebro river valley had new towns. Thus, in 1172 San Vicente de la Sonsierra de Navarra was founded, in 1195 a foundation charter was granted to San Cristóbal de Labraza, and in 1219 the first stone was laid for the concentration of towns in Viana.

=== Charters granted by the kings of Navarre ===
The charters of these four towns are a copy, if possible improved, of the charter of Logroño, a town granted to its inhabitants by King Alfonso VI of León in 1095.

In 1164 Sancho VI of Navarre gave a charter to the town of Laguardia.

Also Sancho "the Wise" in 1172 granted the charter of Laguardia to San Vicente de la Sonsierra.

His successor, Sancho VII granted a charter to the town of Labraza, renaming it San Cristóbal de Labraza, in September 1196.

In February 1219, Sancho VII "the Strong" re-founded Viana, granting it a charter.

The Castilian Ferdinand III granted the Charter of La Bastida in 1242.

=== Demography in the Sonsierra around the second quarter of the 15th century ===
Around 1427 the town with the largest number of houses was Laguardia with 444, followed by San Vicente with 379 and Viana, with 349 houses. Grouped by villas plus their hamlets, Laguardia had 1906 houses, San Vicente 554, Labraza 55 and Viana 437. This must have been a very bloody period, both because of battles and the Black Death, since of the total of 2,138 houses in the four villas, only 1,014 were inhabited.

=== Principality of Viana ===
In 1423 the Navarrese King Charles III the Noble established the principality of Viana, which included the whole of the Sonsierra of Navarre as well as other places. Shortly after, during the civil wars of Navarre, a part of this principality fell into Castilian hands, never to return to the Pyrenean kingdom again.

Map of the civil war of Navarre, with the capture by Castile of the region of Laguardia and Los Arcos.

=== End of Navarrese rule ===
In 1461, Henry IV, cousin and brother-in-law of the Prince of Viana, helped the latter to recover the throne of Navarre; he obtained the surrender of Laguardia, San Vicente, Viana and Los Arcos, which Gonzalo Saavedra occupied with the Castilian army. In the arbitral sentence of Bayonne, of Louis XI of France, in April 1463, to settle the questions arisen between Castile and Aragon, the Sonsierra and the party of Los Arcos, were in pledge to no longer return to the crown of Navarre the first of them while Los Arcos would take almost four centuries (until 1753).

In 1462, the Count of Foix, husband of Doña Leonor in Navarre, taking advantage of the Castilian crisis, seized Calahorra and tried to penetrate into Alfaro, to demand the return of Los Arcos and the Sonsierra; he arrived at the gates of Alfaro without success and finally had to evacuate Calahorra.

In 1466, Enrique IV ordered the inhabitants of the Sonsierra to accede to the Brotherhood of Álava to fight against the thieves and thieves that took refuge, jumping to this part from Álava.

Although the kings of Navarre repeatedly claimed the lands of the Sonsierra from Don Enrique and later from Isabella and Ferdinand, not only they, but all of Navarre, would be occupied by Ferdinand in 1512 and annexed to the crown of Castile.

=== Renaissance and the end of the border line ===
After the Castilian conquest and the last attempts of reconquest by the Navarrese monarch, from 1521 the region enjoyed a long period of peace, since the border was moved to the Pyrenees. From then on, the towns underwent transformations that modified the defensive character with which they were born, towards another more oriented to the economy, where the cultivation of the vine and the passage of the road to Santiago marked the new orientation of the populations. From the 16th century onwards, vineyards and wine, together with olive oil, clearly marked the economy of the region, and the name by which the region was known began to decline and was superseded by the more commonly used names of La Rioja and Rioja Alavesa for the western part, and Tierra Estella or Vianaldea for the Navarrese part.

=== Rioja in the 18th century ===
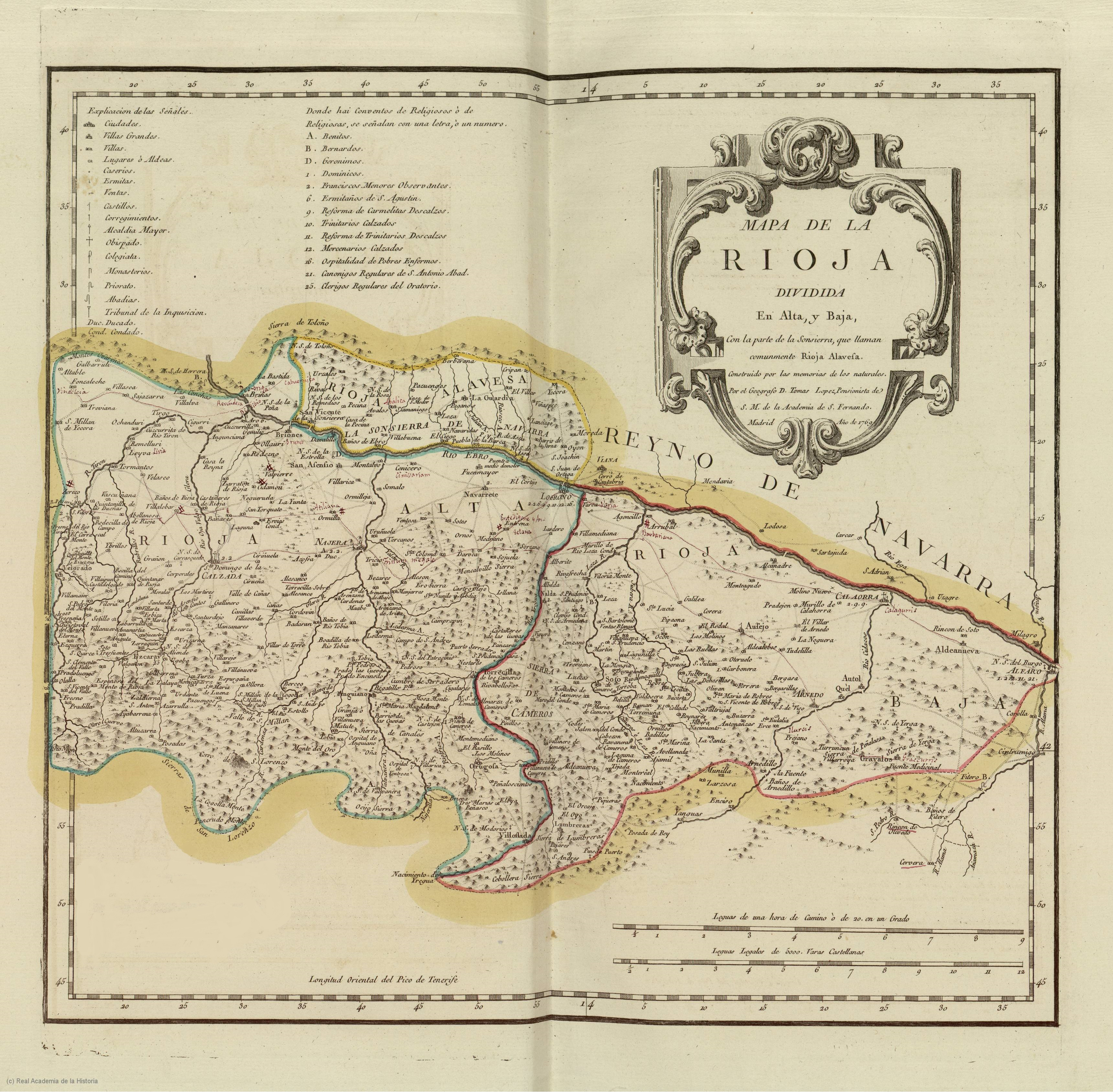
Map of La Rioja divided into Upper, Lower and Alavesa by Tomás López in 1769.

In some maps published on behalf of the Academy of San Fernando in Madrid, such as one drawn up by Tomás López in 1769, La Rioja appears. In it, La Rioja Alavesa is mentioned, together with its denomination of Sonsierra de Navarra.

According to the map: Map of La Rioja divided into Upper and Lower Rioja, with the part of the Sonsierra, which is commonly called Rioja Alavesa. The territory covered by the map was, at that time, assigned to the intendancies of Burgos, Soria and Álava, as a result of the administrative division of Spain into intendancies carried out by Floridablanca in the 18th century.

In the northeastern part, it is shown as bordering the kingdom of Navarre, since it remained as such, under the Hispanic Monarchy, governed by a viceroy until 1841, when it was considered just another province. It should also be noted that this map should not be considered a political map of La Rioja, since this region was not given a provincial administrative framework until 1821, and was given its current demarcation in 1833. It should also be noted that the aforementioned map of Tomás López was criticized by illustrious people of the time for having several inaccuracies, such as not including some parts of the region of La Rioja.

=== Provincial division in the first decades of the 19th century ===
At the end of the 18th century, the first complaints began to be heard about the situation in which La Rioja found itself and voices began to be heard demanding, in their own words, the administrative reunification of La Rioja region, with the creation of a province for it. These came especially from the Sociedad Riojana, which was a society of friends of the country, from the Junta de Rioja, made up of representatives of the municipalities of La Rioja, and from enlightened Riojanos of the time such as Martín Fernández de Navarrete. They demanded that La Rioja should be united with the establishment of boundaries equal to those that the ancient inhabitants of this land had known before the different administrative divisions of the Spanish State took place from the middle of the 18th century onwards, with the creation of the intendancies and the consequent division of La Rioja region into several of them. These claims had a clear identity component. In order to achieve the union, various arguments were put forward, such as those presented by the enlightened Martín Fernández de Navarrete in his Carta de un riojano a un señor diputado en cortes, which argued ethnographic, economic, geographic and historical criteria.

1822 provincial division.

Thus, in 1821 it was proposed to modify the provincial distribution of the Spanish State and, due to the claims of La Rioja, a province was formed for La Rioja, to be called "province of La Rioja", which would also include all the Sonsierra of Navarre, including Viana and La Rioja Alavesa. However, the proposed division of the Spanish State remained without effect due to the absolutist reaction of Ferdinand VII and the situation returned to the previous one. In 1822, during the liberal triennium, the creation of a province for the Rioja region was again proposed, this time to be called the province of Logroño due to the obligation to give each province the name of its capital and in which the whole of the Navarrese Sonsierra was also included. However, in 1833 the boundaries of the province were rectified to leave them as are known today.

== Current administrative division ==
The lands of the former Sonsierra of Navarre are currently divided into three Autonomous Communities:

- Belonging to the Basque Country are the population centers of: Assa, Baños de Ebro, Barriobusto, Cripán, Elciego, Elvillar, Labastida, Labraza, Laguardia, Lanciego, Lapuebla de Labarca, Leza, Laserna, Moreda, Navaridas, Oyón, Páganos, Salinillas de Buradón, Samaniego, Villabuena, Viñaspre, Yécora.
- Belong to La Rioja: Ábalos, Briñas, Peciña, Rivas de Tereso and San Vicente de la Sonsierra.
- Belong to Navarra: Aras, Bargota, Lapoblación, Lazagurria, Meano and Viana.

== Bibliography ==
- Carrasco Pérez, Juan (1992). "El Principado de Viana". Príncipe de Viana (in Spanish). 53 (195): 191–214. ISSN 0032-8472.
- García Fernández, Ernesto (2007). "Fiscalidad, demografía y sociedad en torno a 1427:: las fronteras meridionales del reino de Navarra con la Rioja castellana". Brocar: Cuadernos de investigación histórica (in Spanish) (31): 333–368. doi:10.18172/brocar.1675. ISSN 1885-8309.
