= Ábalos, La Rioja =

Ábalos
- Municipality
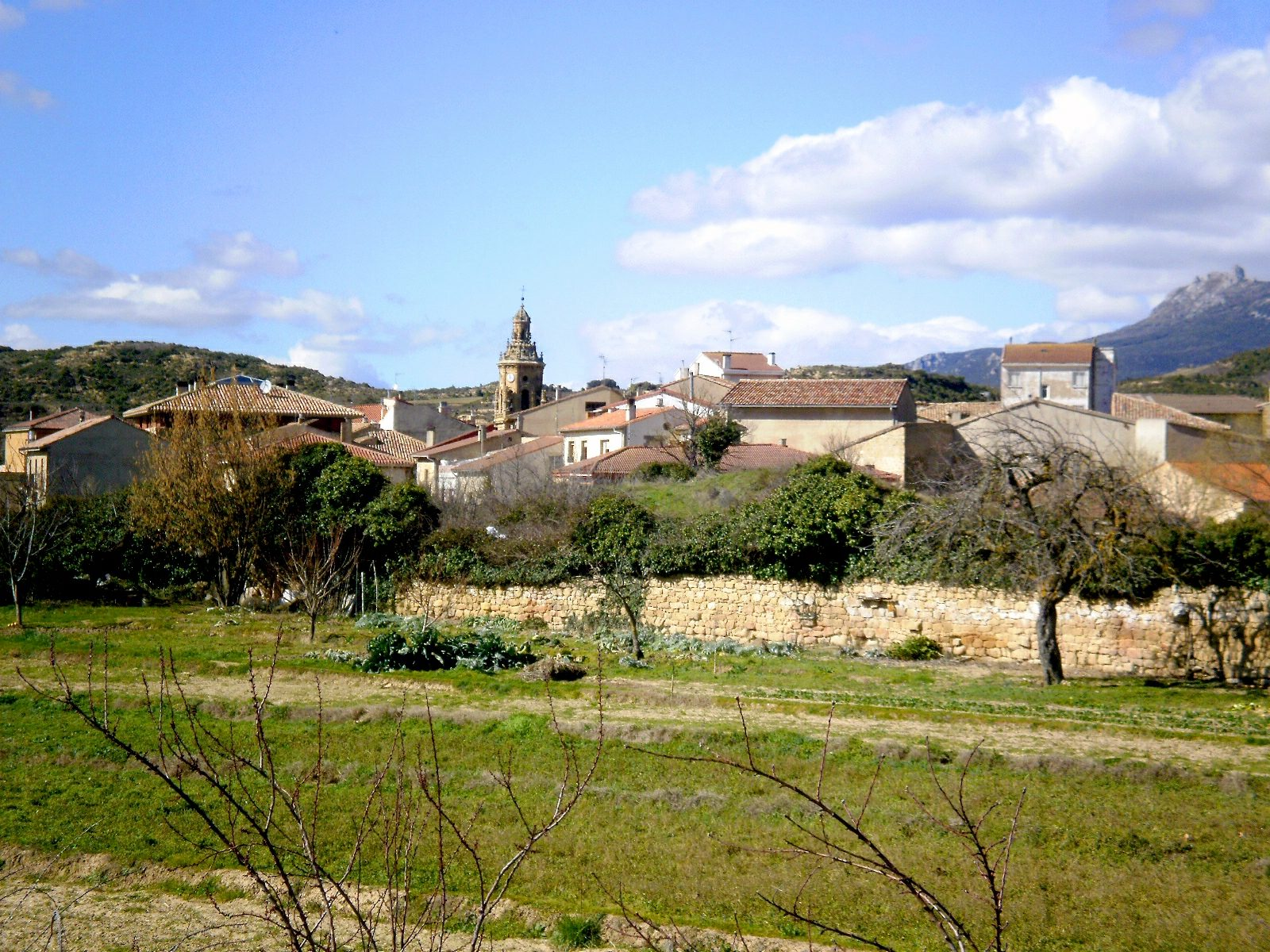
- Ábalos

- Coat of arms

- Municipality of Ábalos

- Location in La Rioja Location in Spain
- Coordinates: 42°34′18″N 2°42′37″W
- Country: Spain
- Autonomous community: La Rioja
- Province: La Rioja
- Comarca: Haro

Government
  - Alcalde: Juan Rufino Blanco Sáez (People's Party)

Area
  - Total: 18.1 km^{2} (7.0 sq mi)

Population (2025-01-01)
  - Total: 256
  - Density: 14.1/km^{2} (36.6/sq mi)
- Website: Official website

Ábalos (Spanish pronunciation: [ˈaβalos]) is a municipality in the autonomous region of La Rioja, Spain. Located in Rioja Alta, on the left bank of the river Ebro, near Haro. It is bounded on the north by the Toloño mountains, on the south by San Asensio and Baños de Ebro, on the east by Samaniego and Villabuena de Álava, and to the west by San Vicente de la Sonsierra.

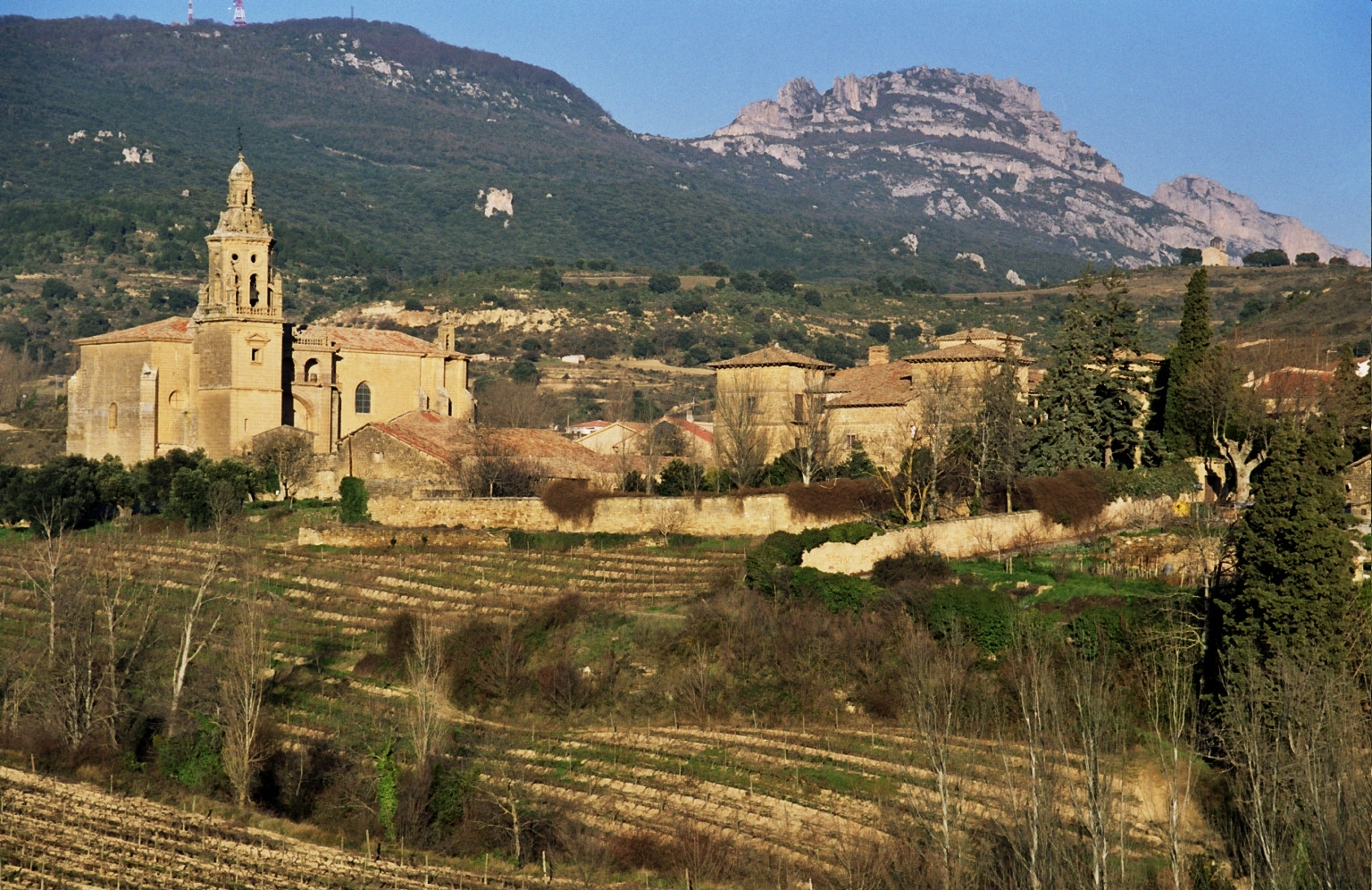
View of Ábalos with the Church of "San Esteban Protomartir" and the "Fernández de Navarrete Palace", from the west.

== History ==
In the Albeldense Chronicle the famous expedition conducted by Alfonso I, king of Asturias along the banks of the Ebro in 740 is mentioned. At that time, Ábalos was a part, as most of the mainland, of the Muslim kingdom of Córdoba. This account refers to the destroyed towns: Mirandam (now Miranda de Ebro), Revendecam, Carbonariam, Abeicam (Ábalos, from where he crossed the Ebro), Brunes (could be Briones but this is uncertain), Cinissariam (now Cenicero) and Alesanco. Control of the area then returned to Muslim hands until its final conquest in the late ninth and early tenth century.

In the eleventh and twelfth centuries the village is mentioned several times in the documents of the San Millán Monastery. Among them, as recorded by the Bishop Sandoval, the donation of the church of San Felix to the Monastery of San Millán, made by Gonzalo Núñez de Lara and his wife Goto Núñez in 1084.

In the fifteenth century it is known that Ábalos was village of San Vicente de la Sonsierra, whose lordship boasted different personages: Pedro Velasco, Pedro Girón, Juliana Aragón, Bernardino Velasco, etc. always due to numerous setbacks such as donations of gratitude, direct sales or inheritance.

In 1397 Charles III of Navarre granted Rui Lopez de Dábalos the town with all its land and royal rights except the sovereignty and appeal to the court of the King.

Ábalos was a village of San Vicente de la Sonsierra, whose lordship was donated by John II of Navarre in 1430 to General Pedro Fernandez de Velasco II, the property then going on to be supervised by different lineages, either through donations, wills, acknowledgments or sale, including Pedro Girón, Juliana Aragón, Bernardino Fernandez de Velasco until it fell on Juan Hurtado de Velasco, Count of Castilnovo, who authorized on July 5, 1653 the separation of the town of San Vicente, on payment of 449,800 maravedis.

Ábalos, however, continued to belong to the Lordship of San Vicente until 1727, when, as a result of debts incurred by the Counts of Castilnovo, gentlemen of the time, the estate was put on auction by the Tribunal of the Inquisition of Logrono, being awarded to the neighbors who bid up to 53,500 maravedis. Since then Ábalos is an independent town.

Later, Francisco Fernández de Navarrete Ramírez de la Piscina (born in Ábalos on September 28, 1728) - son of Martín Fernández de Navarrete y de Zárate (Navarrete, b. March 15, 1684- Ábalos)., knight of the Order de Calatrava since 1703 owner of the Ábalos Palace - he married María Catalina Ximénez de Tejada y Argaiz (born in Funes, Navarra, b. November 28, 1734- Ábalos 1792), niece of the Prince of Malta and Gozo, and LXIX Grand Master of the Sovereign Order of Malta, Francisco Ximénez de Tejada y Eslava (Funes b. September 13, 1703 - Malta, December 1775), daughter of the I Marquis of Ximénez de Tejada, sister of the II Marquis of Ximénez de Tejada

Two of the couple's children:

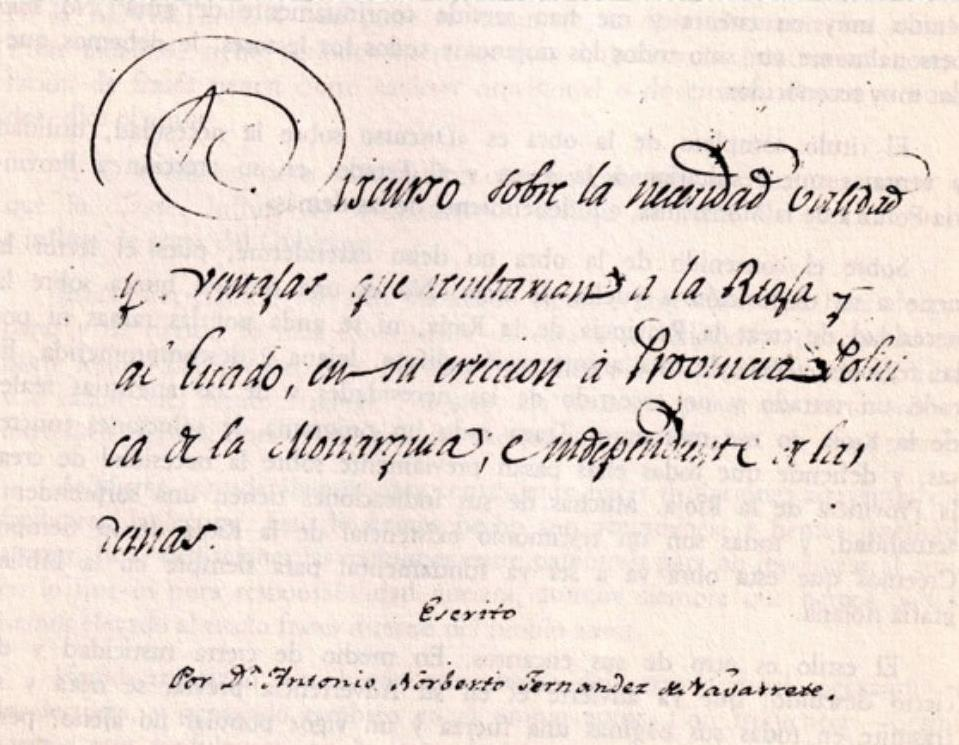
- Speech on the necessity, validity and advantages that would result to La Rioja and the State, in its establishment as a Political Province of the Monarchy and Independent of the others." (1813). Antonio Fernandez de Navarrete Ximenez de Tejada
  Antonio Fernández de Navarrete y Ximénez de Tejada (Ábalos, June 6, 1759 - Ábalos, April 30, 1830). One of the fathers of "provincialism of La Rioja". Author of "Speech on the necessity, validity and advantages that would result to La Rioja and the State, in its establishment as a Political Province of the Monarchy and Independent of the others." (1813). Member of the "Ábalos". Heir to the Line of Succession of the Marquisate of Ximénez de Tejada. (V),
- Martín Fernández de Navarrete y Ximénez de Tejada (Ábalos, November 8, 1765-Madrid, October 8, 1844), Senator, Director of the Royal Academy of History of Spain (1825-1844), Grand Cross of the American Order by Ysabel the Catholic. Commander of the Legion of Honor of France. Knight of the Sovereign and Military Order of Malta. State Councilor. Born member of the Admiralty Board, officer of the Spanish Navy, Spanish writer and historian,

They were members of the Royal Economic Society of the Rioja Castellana.

For this reason, in 1790 Ábalos was one of the founding municipalities of the Royal Economic Society of La Rioja, which was one of the societies of noblemen of the country founded in the 18th century in accordance with the ideals of the Enlightenment.

Both brothers, Antonio and Martín Fernández de Navarrete and Ximénez de Tejada, were very important in the founding of La Rioja as an independent province when the provincial division was carried out in the 19th century. Until the creation of the province of "Logroño" was consolidated in a long process - this is what the Rioja Castellana would initially be called until it recovered its name when the province of Logroño was transformed into an Autonomous Community in 1982 - the territory that the Community occupies today Autonomous Region of La Rioja was divided between the provinces of Burgos and Soria.

Abolos > Avolos (alpha, beta, omicron, lambda, omicron, sigma) means "awkward" in Greek, may have some connection as Greeks did found the ancient Greek city of Emborio is Spain. Also Bolikos >Volikos (beta, omicron, lambda, iota, kappa, omicron, sigma) is the antonym.

== Demography ==
As of 1 January 2010 the population was 369 inhabitants, 231 men and 138 women.

demographic vertical bar chart of between 1857 and 2010
Legal population (1857-1897) according to the population census published by the Instituto Nacional de Estadística in the nineteenth century.
Legal population (1900-1991) or Resident population (2001) according to the population census published by the Instituto Nacional de Estadística.
Population according to the municipal register of 2010 published by the Instituto Nacional de Estadística.

Municipal entities
Population nucleus	Type of population entity	Smaller entities	Population
Ábalos	Villa		369
ÁBALOS			369

== Etymology ==
In an 1199 bull, through which privileges were granted to the San Millán de la Cogolla monastery, the name Dáualos appeared. This name, according to Ortiz Trifol, was related to Abalasqueta, the Basque, or rather it was the accusative plural of the anthroponym of the second declension of Abaris, perhaps taking into account the identification between the Varduli city of Thabuca and Avalos, indicates . Most likely it is related to the anthroponym, which would suggest an "Avalos or Davalos" village.

== Politics ==
In 2007, the Popular Party (PP) claimed victory in the municipal elections of the Abalos City council winning four seats to the Spanish Socialist Workers Party (PSOE)'s three.

Up to that time, the city government had fallen into the hands of the Socialists, who have always had three or four councillors since 1979. The Union of the Democratic Centre (Spain) (UCD) or independent candidates got some councillors in different elections, while the PP, meanwhile, did not contest the elections between 1979 and 1991.

== Tourism ==
=== Buildings and monuments ===
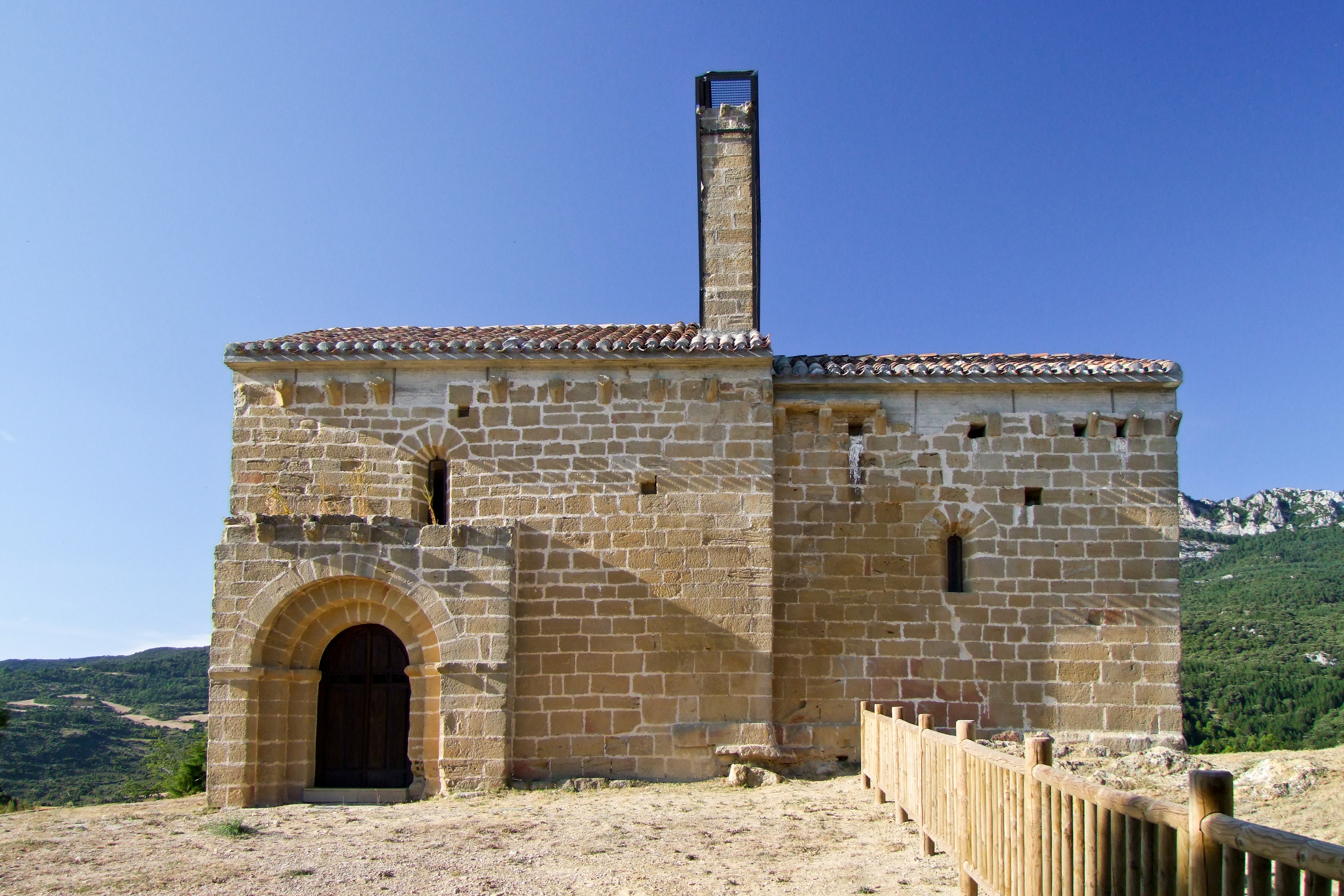
Hermitage of San Felices.

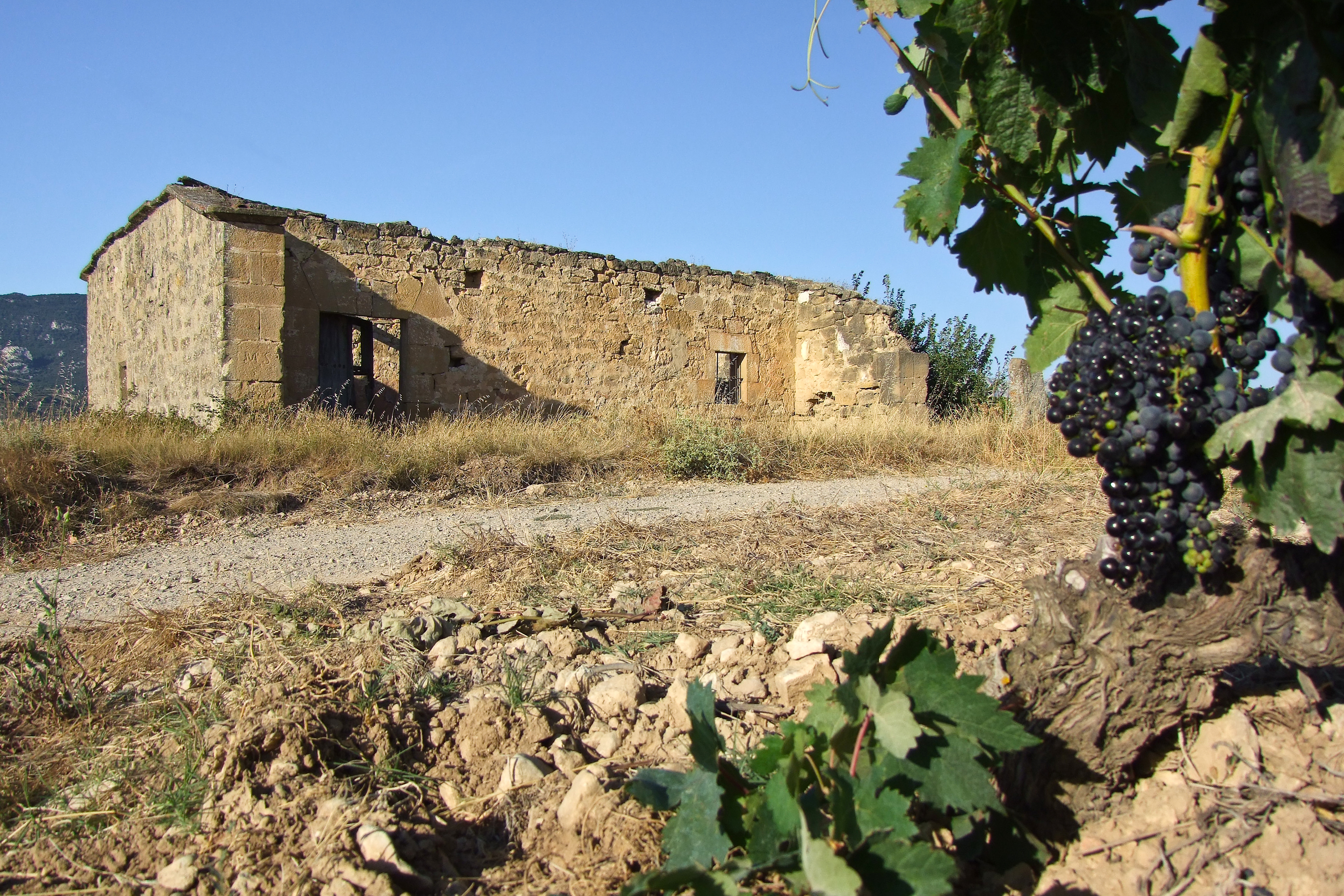
Hermitage of San Roque.

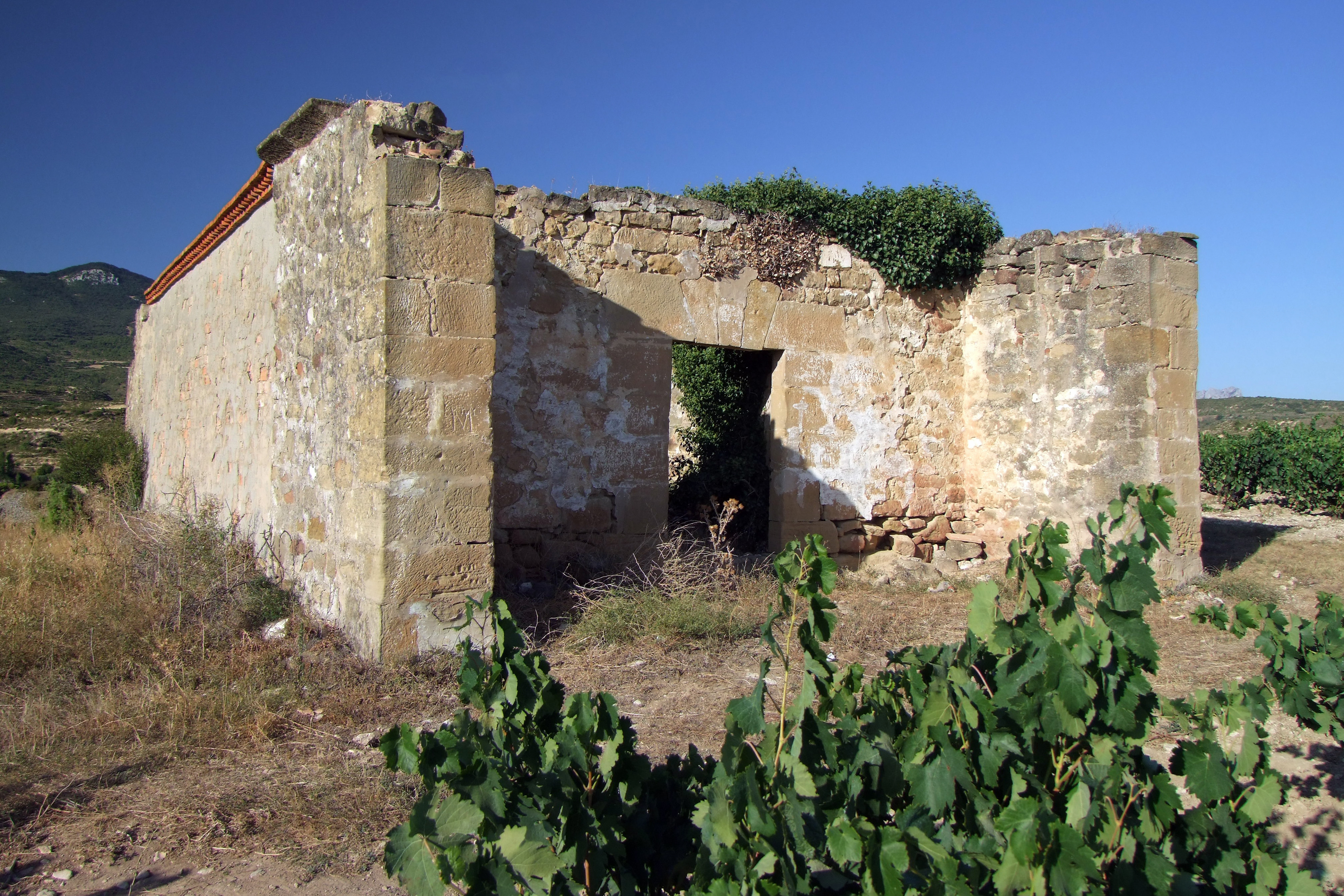
Hermitage of San Bartolomé.

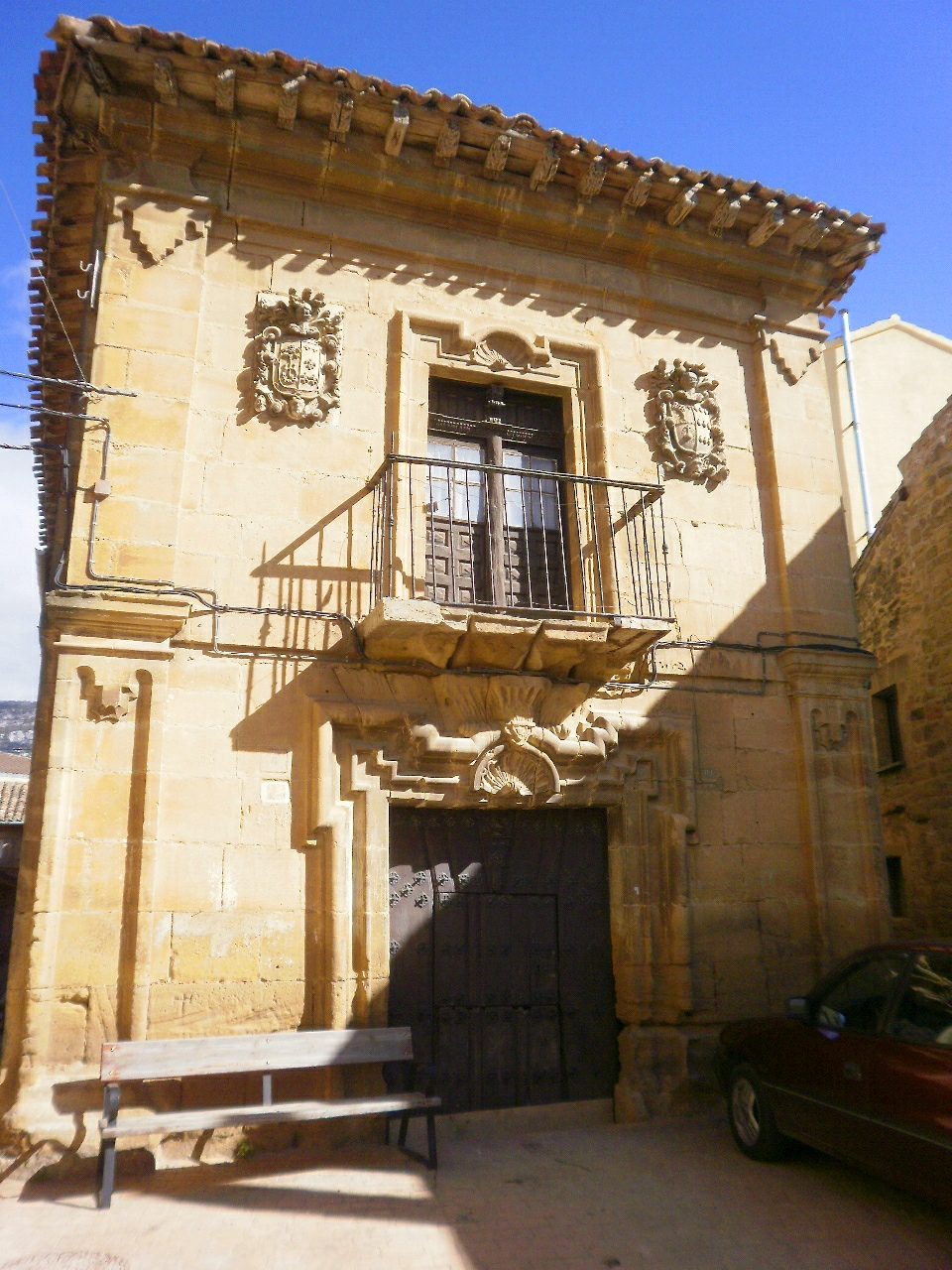
House of the Viceroy of Naples.

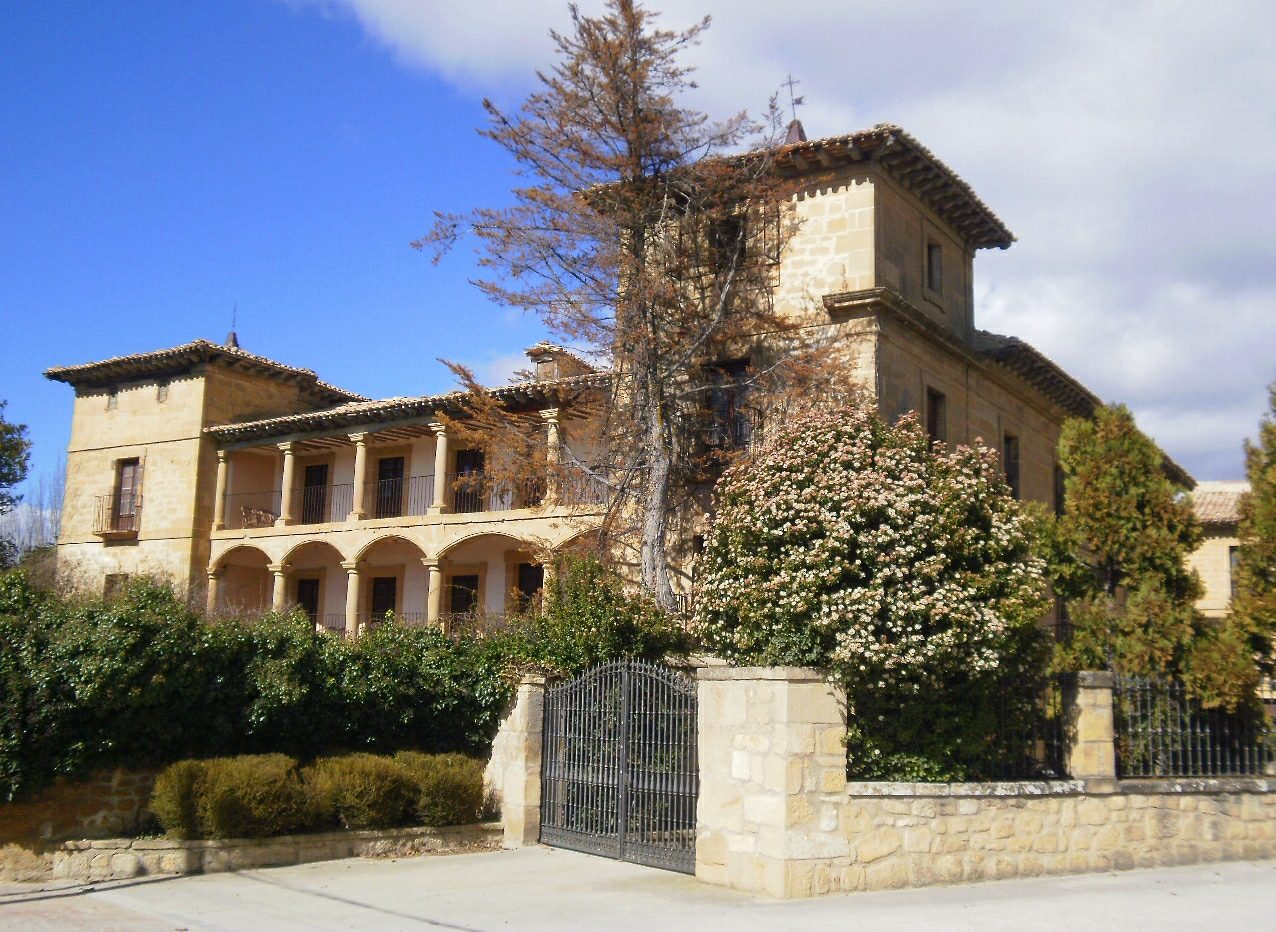
The Marquis of Legarda Palace.

=== St. Stephen Protomartyr Parish Church ===
The Iglesia Parroquial de San Esteban Protomártir (: St. Stephen Protomartyr Parish Church) was declared an asset of Cultural Interest in the category of Monument on September 28, 1983. Its flamboyant gothic style was built in the sixteenth century. It has a single nave divided into three sections and a crown. The tower is baroque, built between 1735 and 1740. The altarpiece, located in the presbytery, dates back to the mid sixteenth century and is attributed to the workshop of the Beaugrant family.

Other items of note are:

- The tomb of Francisco Antonio Ramirez de la Piscina, Baroque from the first half of the eighteenth century.
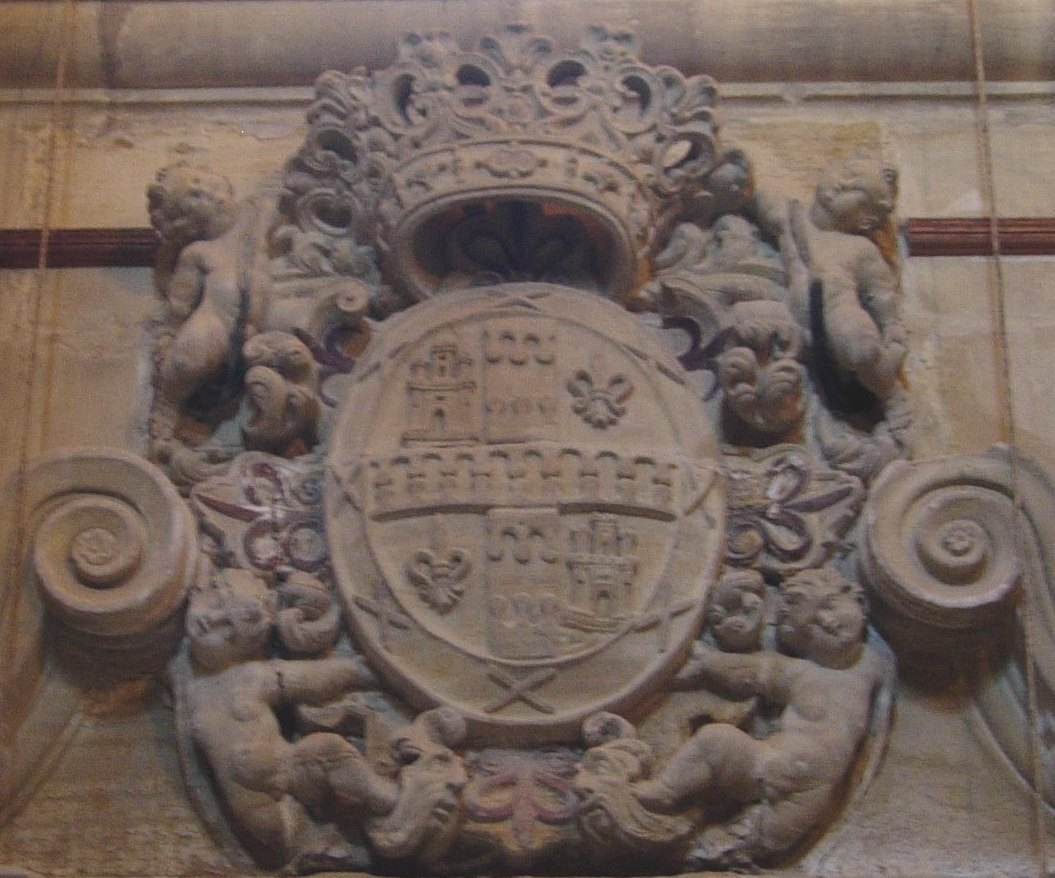
- Nobility Coat of Arms "Fernández de Navarrete" in the family Pantheon. Abalos. La Rioja. Spain
  Pantheon of the "Fernández de Navarrete" family, with its characteristic coat of arms carved in stone with the Royal Crown of the Royal House of the Kingdom of Navarre from which its members descend, and crosses of the military orders of Calatrava and Santiago. Buried in the Pantheon is Martín Fernández de Navarrete y Ximénez de Tejada (Ábalos, November 8, 1765-Madrid, October 8, 1844), Senator, Director of the Royal Academy of History of Spain (1825-1844), Grand Cross of the American Order of Isabella the Catholic. Commander of the Legion of Honor of France. Knight of the Sovereign and Military Order of Malta. State Councilor. Born member of the Admiralty Board, officer of the Spanish Navy, Spanish writer and historian, one of the most relevant historical figures of the Spanish 18th and 19th centuries, born in Ábalos, as well as other prominent members of this family. of the Virgin of the Rose, sixteenth-century Gothic.
- Seating in the choir loft, the beginning of the same century.

=== Hermitages ===
==== The San Felices Hermitage ====
The San Felices Hermitage is located in an open field to the northeast of Ábalos. It is Romanesque and it seems that the chapel is the only remnant of a monastery which, in the twelfth century, already belonged to San Millán. Built in ashlar stone, it has a triumphal arch and two portals. There are anthropomorphic graves nearby.

=== The Virrey de Nápoles house ===
Popularly known by this name ((in Spanish): la casa del Virrey de Nápoles), alluding to the Viceroyalty of Naples.

=== The house of the Canton or of Ramírez de la Piscina ===
Made of ashlar stone. It bears the shields of Ramirez de la Piscina and López de Ornillos.

=== Palace of the Marquises of Legarda ===
Also known as the "Ramírez de la Piscina" palace or the "Fernández de Navarrete" palace, the Ábalos Palace has its origins in the lineage of Ramírez de la Piscina, whose shields are found on the main façade, all of which is made of ashlar stone. .

Since 1710 the palace became known as the "Fernández de Navarrete" Palace when Martín Fernández de Navarrete y de Zárate (Navarrete, b. March 15, 1684- Ábalos), knight of the Order of Calatrava since 1703, (grandson of Juan Francisco Fernández de Navarrete y de Ayala, born in Navarrete in 1631, knight of the Order of Santiago since 1665, "secretary [equivalent to "minister" in 21st-century terminology] of His Majesty, and official of the secretary of the universal office" of King Philip III of Spain, mayor of the noblemen of Navarrete. His father was Martín José Fernández de Navarrete y Ubago, born in Navarrete in 1655, knight of the Order of Santiago since 1671), married Catalina Ramírez de la Piscina López de Peciña in the Church of San Esteban Protomártir de Ábalos.

On December 28, 1798, in the cathedral of Santa María de Vitoria, Antonio Fernández de Navarrete y Ximénez de Tejada (Ábalos, June 6, 1759 - Ábalos, April 30, 1830), married María de Esquivel y Navarrete, (baptized in the Cathedral of Santa María de Vitoria on February 2, 1778), "daughter of Don Ignacio de Esquivel y Peralta, V Marquis of Legarda", a title that would end up giving its name to the building.

It would be the couple's grandson, Antonio Fernández de Navarrete Hurtado de Mendoza (Ábalos, La Rioja 1859 - Madrid, February 1936) who would inherit the title of Marquis of Legarda, which today gives its name to the palace in many publications.

The history of the lineage that built the palace dates back to Infante D. Ramiro de Navarra, founder of said lineage, who was married to Mrs. Cristina Elvira, daughter of the Cid Campeador. The eldest son of both, García Ramírez, the Restorer, was crowned King of Navarre in the year 1134.

D. Ramiro participated, with other Navarrese knights, in the first Crusade, together with Godfrey of Bouillon, entering Jerusalem with his army through the Probatic Pool.

In his will, he ordered the construction of a temple for his second son, D. Sancho Ramírez, Lord of Peñacerrada, under the invocation of "Our Lady of la Piscina", so that the piece of the True Cross that he brought would be kept there. of Jerusalem. This basilica, perfectly restored, is located half a league from Ábalos. D. Sancho called himself Ramírez de la Piscina, and so did his descendants.

He also ordered the creation of the Solar Badge and Royal House of la Piscina, which has defined chapters and regulations and whose last patrons are linked to the Ábalos Palace.

One of them, Francisco Antonio Ramírez de la Piscina, Archdeacon, commissioner of the Crusade and vicar general of the Archbishopric of Toledo, carried out, at the end of the 17th century and beginning of the 18th century, various works to expand and improve the primitive building, as well as the creation of a garden with geometric drawings of boxwood, which is preserved intact today. It has filed a file as an Asset of Cultural Interest in the category of Historical Garden on November 13, 1980. The most notable of the expansion works mentioned are the construction of three towers, two of them on the façade facing noon on the which are supported by three superimposed porticoed galleries, in the style of the Italian Renaissance "loggias", which inspired the project. At the foot of this façade, there is the aforementioned austere garden, which completes the complex, of notable originality.

=== Guardia House (or house of the wrought iron fence) ===
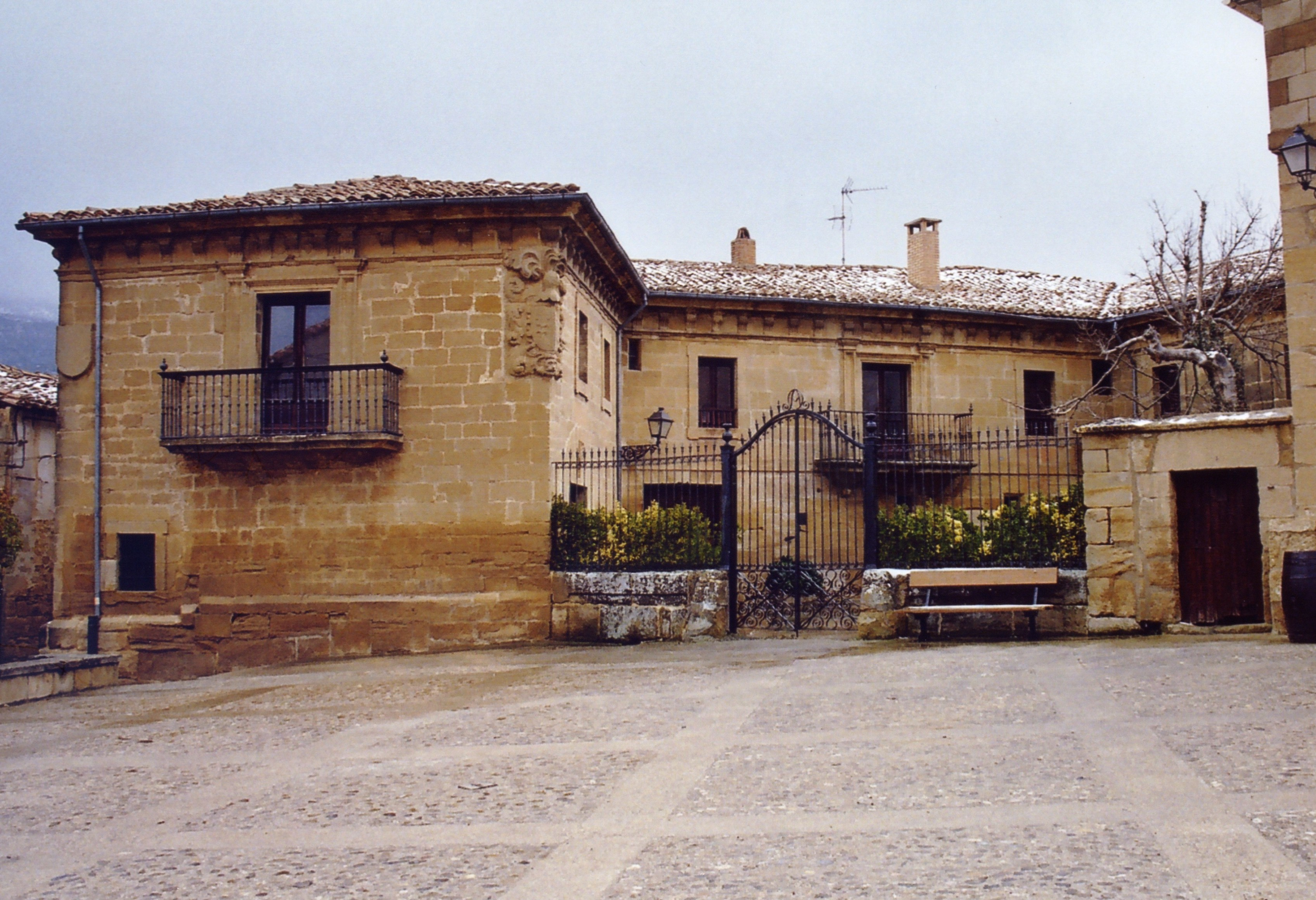
House of Guardia. Martín Fernández de Navarrete Square. Abalos.

Located in the Plaza de "Martín Fernández de Navarrete", next to the Ábalos Town Hall, with an imposing coat of arms on its walls, it currently belongs to the descendants of the Viscount of Villahermosa de Ambite, Antonio Fernández de Navarrete Rada (Zaragoza, 1890 - Madrid 1971).

=== Ornillos family house ===
Located in Plaza Fermín Gurbindo.

=== La Real Divisa Winery ===
The Bodegas de la Real Divisa, which date back to 1367, are one of the oldest producing wineries in La Rioja and Europe. They belong to a family saga that holds the noble title of Marquis of Legarda. Its owners, through generations, have maintained the spirit of good work. And their wine was baptized with the family noble title as a symbol of prestige and tradition.

This winery, located in the town of Ábalos, owes its name to the emblem of the Jug or Terrace with lilies that is located above the arch of the entrance door and that recalls both its antiquity and its relationship with the Royal House of Navarra.

Bodegas de la Real Divisa was the first Rioja winery to receive a Medal at the Bordeaux Exhibition in 1895.

Marqués de Legarda, the Bodegas' red wine, adorned the tables of many Spanish noble families.

King García of Nájera (1035-1054), founded the Order of the Terrace, to which said emblem corresponds, to commemorate his encounter with an image of the Virgin Our Lady in a cave, on which he erected the Monastery of Santa María La Real de Nájera, pantheon of the Kings of Navarra.

According to tradition, King Don García went hunting with his goshawk one morning, near the Peña de Nájera, on the French path of Saint James Way. A partridge rose up and, pursued by the goshawk, went to take refuge inside a cave hidden among brambles and holm oaks. The falcon entered the cave and behind him, the king, who found an image of Our Lady with the Child, at whose feet and on both sides, the goshawk and the partridge were resting in perfect harmony, and, in the foreground, he I found a jar or terrace with lilies.

The Order of the Terrace The Order of the Terrace is the first Order of chivalry known in Spain. The Kings of Navarre and their descendants and the most distinguished nobles of the Court belonged to it. To honor our lady, King D. García established the religious custom of the "salve sabatina", which the kings of Spain preserve, and chose the day of the Annunciation for the celebration of his annual festival.

The Order of the Terrace had its greatest splendor in the 11th and 12th centuries, practically disappearing afterwards. In the first years of the 15th century, a refoundation was carried out by the Infante D. Fernando de Antequera, who modified the original emblem, adding a griffin that holds the Jar of Lilies.

The oldest part of the Real Divisa Winery must correspond to the period of splendor of the aforementioned Order, as witnessed by the purity of the work on the Terrace of its façade, which lacks the additions incorporated in 1403, so, in any case it must be prior to this last date.

Francisco Fernández de Navarrete y López de Montenegro (San Sebastián, Guipúzcoa, 1932 - Madrid 2021) was Marquis of Legarda. This title was granted in 1664 and is the name with which four wines from Bodegas Real Divisa have been baptized. These wineries were founded with this name in 1968, in Ábalos, La Rioja. They are considered among the oldest in La Rioja, and are located in a 14th-century building. Don Francisco Fernández de Navarrete López de Montenegro, owner and president of the wineries until his death in 2021, followed in the footsteps of his ancestors.

=== Guardaviñas (Winekeepers) ===
In the southern area of the municipality; Among the vineyard fields, you can find these restored huts to attract tourism. The best known are the Prado and Piriguita vineyard guards. Apart from these cabins, there are remains of the wine industry.

== Notable people ==
- Antonio Fernández de Navarrete y Ximénez de Tejada (Ábalos, June 6, 1759 - Ábalos, April 30, 1830). Member of the Royal Economic Society of the Rioja Castellana. One of the fathers of "provincialism of La Rioja". Author of "Speech on the necessity, validity and advantages that would result to La Rioja and the State, in its establishment as a Political Province of the Monarchy and Independent of the others." (1813). He is the heir to the Line of Succession of the Marquisate of Ximénez de Tejada. (V).
- Martín Fernández de Navarrete y Ximénez de Tejada (Ábalos, November 8, 1765-Madrid, October 8, 1844), Senator, Director of the Royal Academy of History of Spain (1825-1844), Grand Cross of the American Order by Ysabel the Catholic. Commander of the Legion of Honor of France. Knight of the Sovereign and Military Order of Malta. State Councilor of Spain. Born member of the Admiralty Board, Spanish Navy officer, Spanish writer and historian.
- Julián Fernández de Navarrete y Ximénez de Tejada (Ábalos, La Rioja, February 16, 1767 – Valencia, April 20, 1820) Minister of Finance of Spain, General Treasurer of the Council of Finance, perpetual secular councilor of the Board of Royal Hospitals and minister honorary of the War Chamber. Doctor in Humanities and Jurisprudence.
- Eustaquio Fernández de Navarrete y Fernández de Navarrete (Ábalos, La Rioja, September 20, 1820- Ábalos. December 22, 1866). Academic of the Royal Spanish Academy. Writer. Historian. Heir to the Line of Succession of the Marquisate of Ximénez de Tejada. (VII).
