= Rioja Alavesa =

Region in Álava, Basque Country, Spain

Coordinates: 42°33′11″N 2°36′12″W

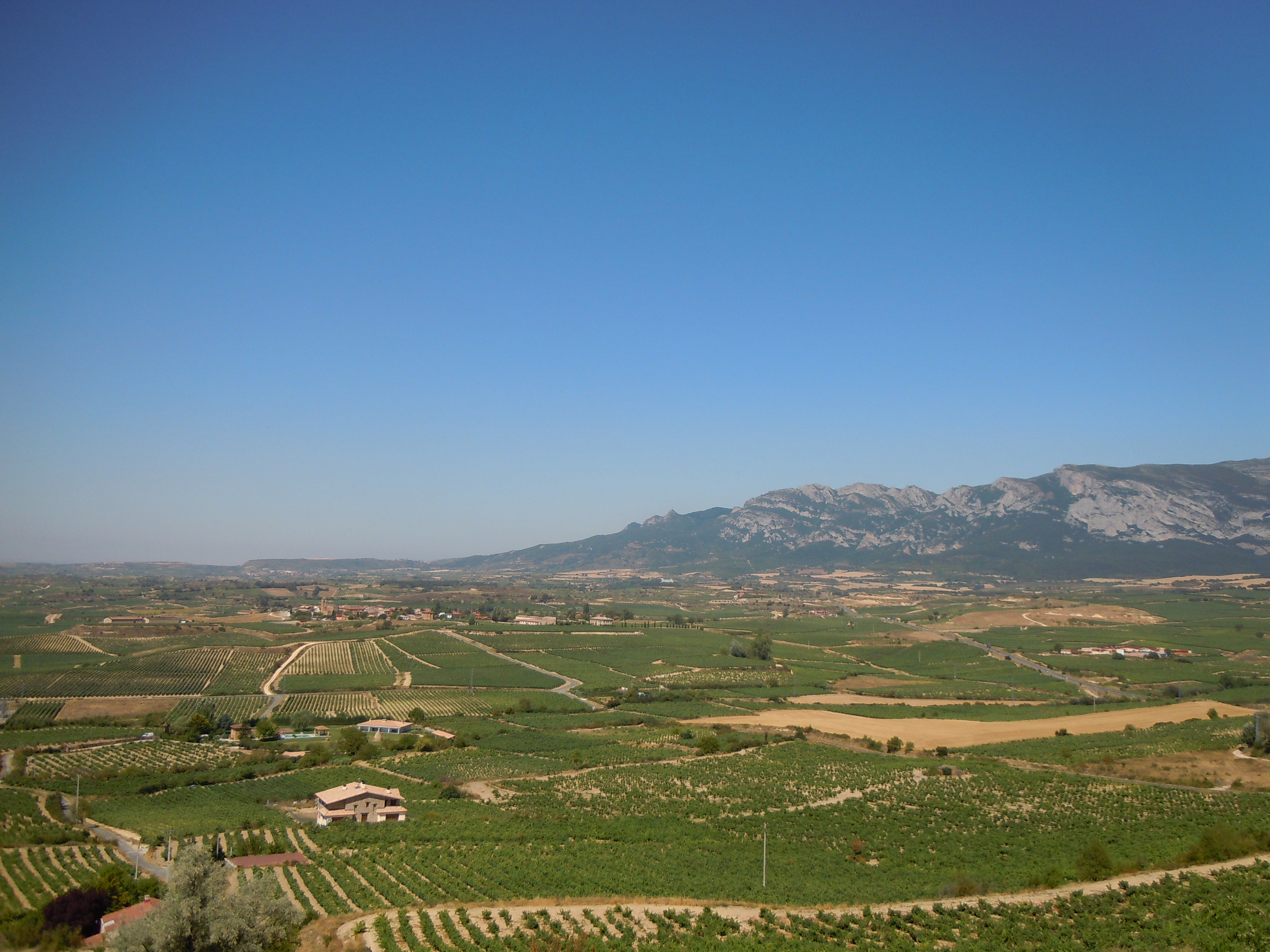
A view of vineyards in Rioja Alavesa

Rioja Alavesa (Basque: Arabako Errioxa), officially Cuadrilla de Laguardia-Rioja Alavesa, in Spanish, and Biasteri-Arabako Errioxako kuadrilla, in Basque, is one of seven comarcas that make up the province of Álava, Spain. It covers an area of 315.83 km² with a population of 11,360 people (2010). The capital lies at Laguardia. It is part of a notable wine growing region.

== Geography ==
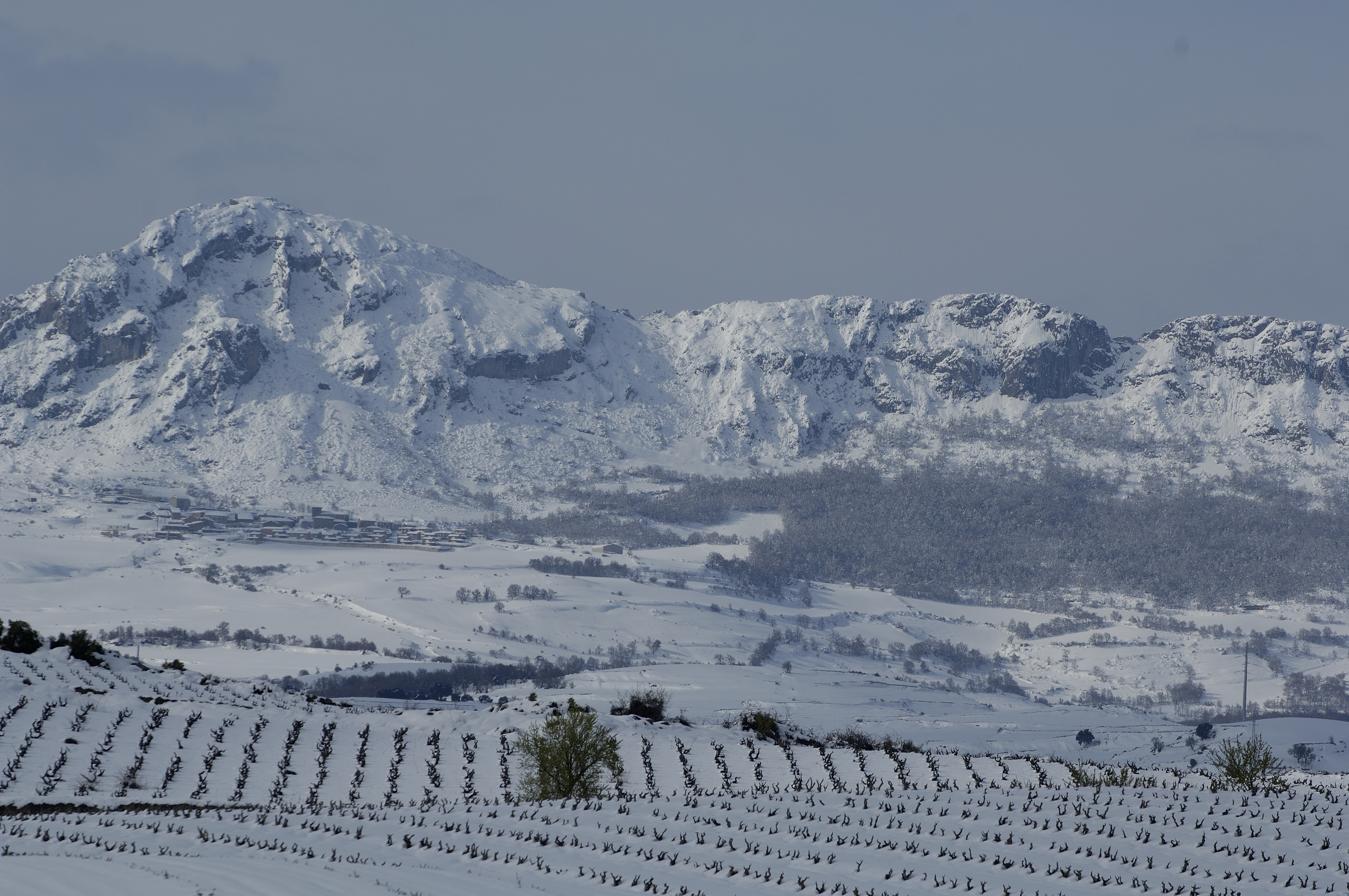
Covered in winter snow

The Rioja Alavesa's northern boundary is formed by the Sierra de Cantabria and Sierra de Toloño, mountain ranges that separate it from the rest of Álava. To the south, its geographical limit is marked by the Ebro River, its border with the neighboring autonomous community of La Rioja.

The Sonsierra of La Rioja includes the municipalities of Ábalos and San Vicente de la Sonsierra, located north of the Ebro River. Although geographically part of the river's left bank, these municipalities form a wedge of land technically belonging to the autonomous community of La Rioja. It thus divides the Rioja Alavesa in two: in the western part, the municipality of Labastida, and the remaining Rioja Alavesa municipalities to the east, with Laguardia and Oion as its main towns. The border with Navarre to the east is not based on clearly defined geographical features like the aforementioned boundaries. The rivers within the area are all tributaries of the Ebro.

== History ==
In 2023 researchers examined the remains of 338 individuals from a mass grave in a cave, dated to the late neolithic. They concluded many of those buried in the shallow grave showed signs of violent, unhealed injuries, the result of the first large-scale warfare in Europe.

There are some dolmens and other archaeological remnants of the Middle-Late Bronze Age La Hoya people. The Romans established themselves in the area due to its climate and mountainous landscape. During the Middle Ages, this region belonged to the Kingdom of Navarre, the Sonsierra, which was eventually occupied and annexed to the Crown of Castile in 1463 as a result of Castile's intervention in the Kingdom of Navarre.

== Wine Region ==
The local economy is based primarily on viticulture and the production of Rioja wines, forming part of the Rioja denominación de origen. The region possesses 11,500 hectares of vineyards.

La Rioja DOCa (Denominación de Origen Calificada, akin to AVA in US wine-growing regions) is separated into three subregions, Rioja Alta, Rioja Baja and Rioja Alavesa. Despite having a very similar climate as the Rioja Alta region, the Rioja Alavesa produces wines with a fuller body and higher acidity. Vineyards in the area have a low vine density with large spacing between rows. This is due to the relatively poor conditions of the soil with the vines needing more distance from each other and less competition for the nutrients in the surrounding soil. On the slopes of the Sierra de Toloño, parts of the Rioja Alavesa may benefit from the cooler temperatures found at these higher altitudes.

== List of Towns ==
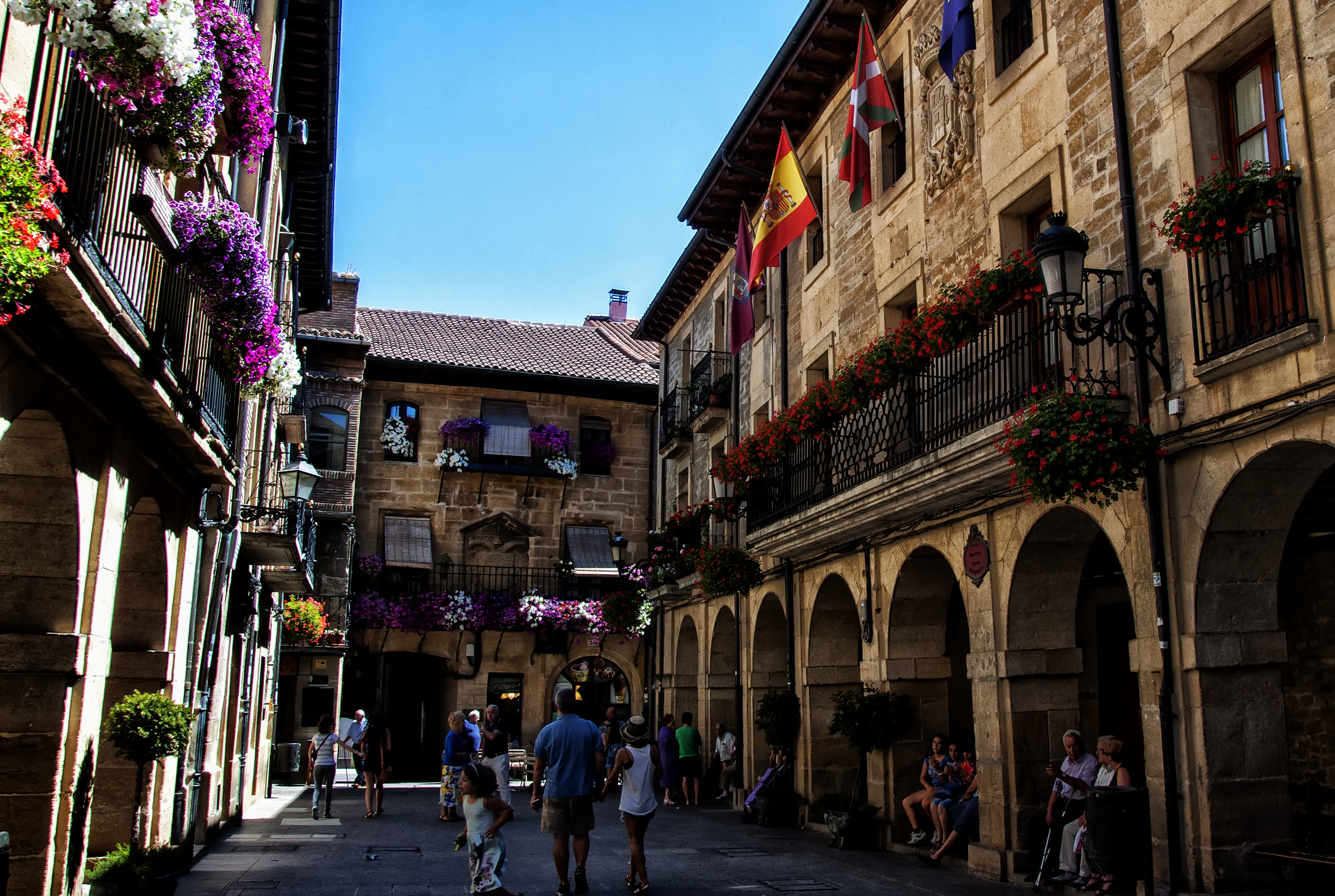
Main square of Laguardia, capital of the county.

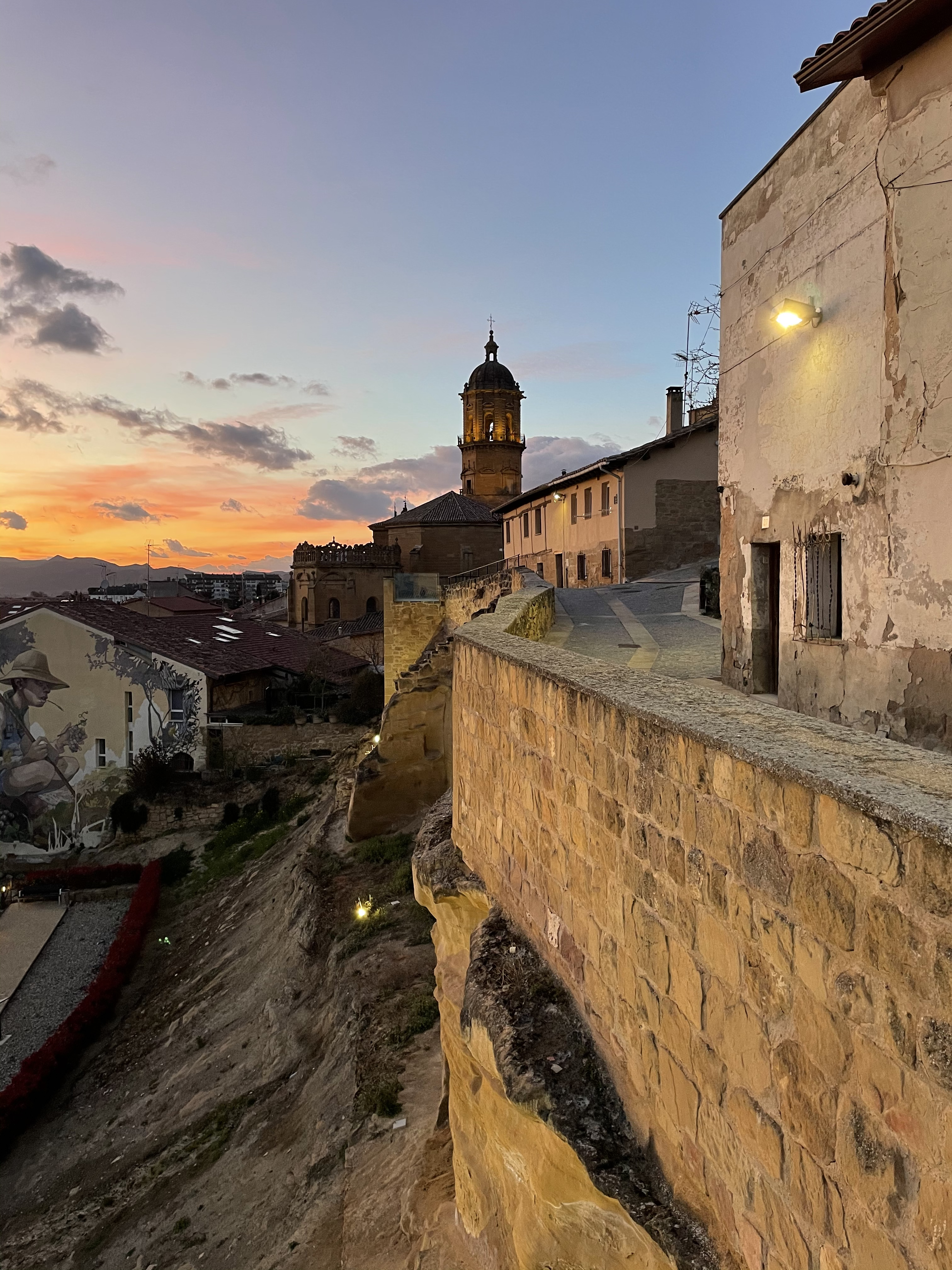
Medieval walls of Labastida

From most to least populous, the 15 municipalities of the region are:

- Oyón-Oion
- Laguardia
- Labastida
- Elciego
- Lapuebla de Labarca
- Lanciego/Lantziego
- Elvillar/Bilar
- Samaniego
- Villabuena de Álava/Eskuernaga
- Baños de Ebro/Mañueta
- Yécora/Iekora
- Leza
- Moreda de Álava
- Navaridas
- Kripan
