= Moreda de Álava =

Moreda de Álava / Moreda Araba
- Municipality
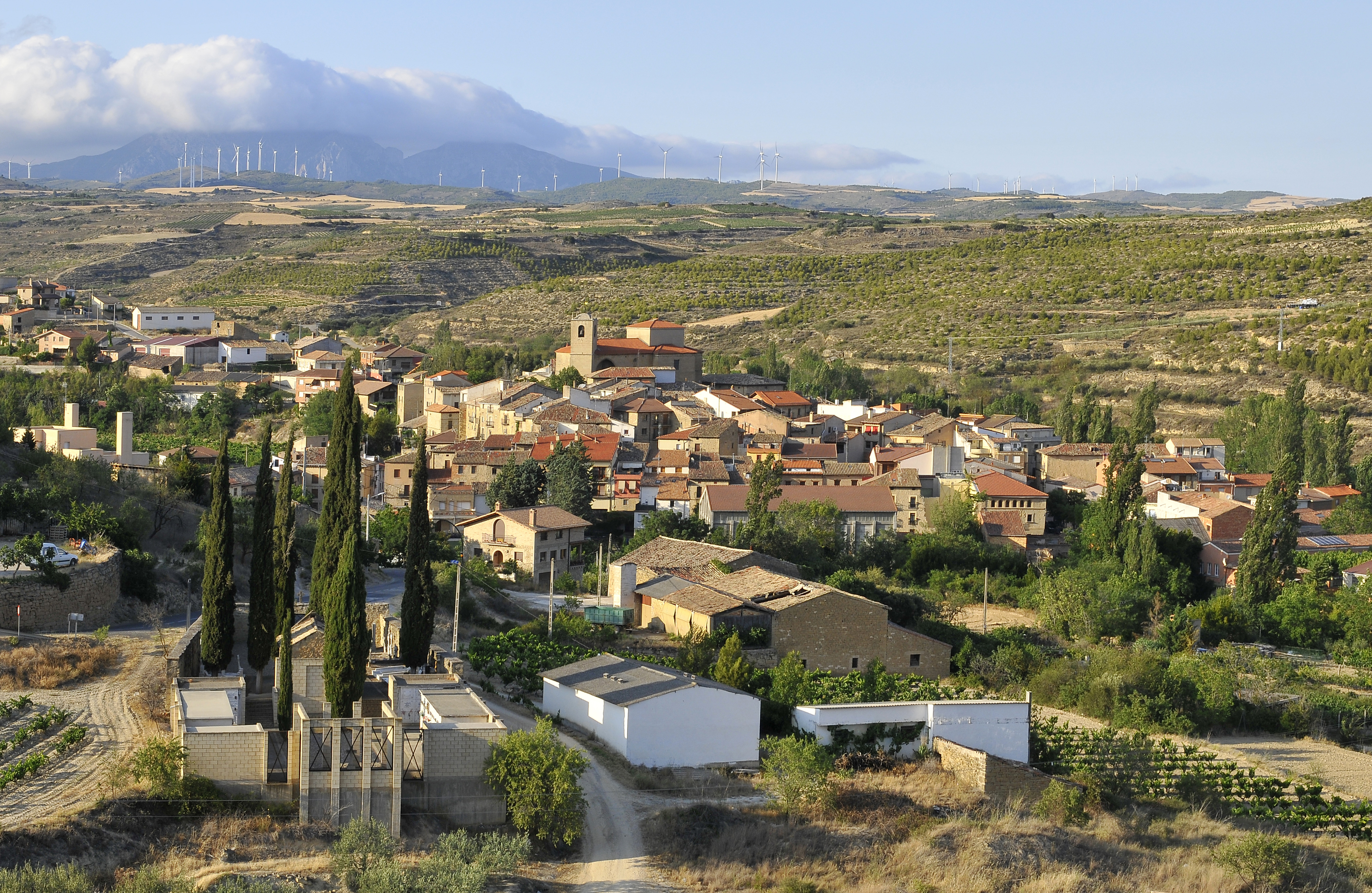

- Coat of arms

- Location of Moreda de Álava within the Basque Country
- Coordinates: 42°31′N 2°24′W
- Country: Spain
- Autonomous Community: Basque Country
- Province: Álava
- Comarca: Rioja Alavesa

Government
  - Mayor: Miguel Ángel Bujanda Fernández

Area
  - Total: 9 km^{2} (3.5 sq mi)
- Elevation (AMSL): 460 m (1,510 ft)

Population (2025-01-01)
  - Total: 218
  - Density: 24/km^{2} (63/sq mi)
- Time zone: UTC+1 (CET)
  - Summer (DST): UTC+2 (CEST (GMT +2))
- Postal code: 01322

Moreda de Álava in Spanish or Moreda Araba in Basque is a town and municipality located in the province of Álava, in the Basque Country, northern Spain.
