= Navaridas =

- Municipality
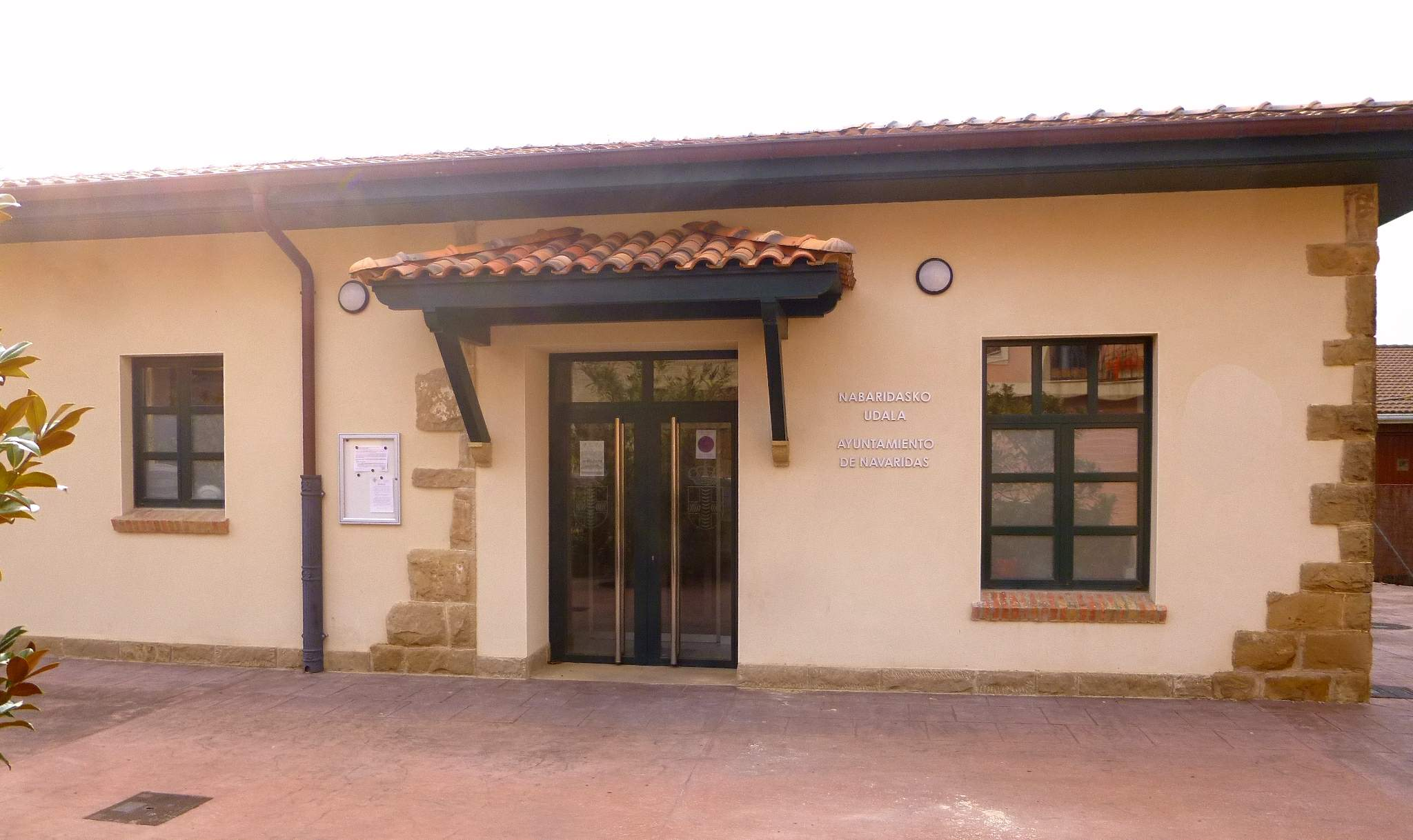
- Town hall

- Coat of arms

- Location within Basque Country Navaridas (Spain)
- Coordinates: 42°32′46″N 2°37′24″W
- Country: Spain
- Autonomous community: Basque Country
- Province: Araba/Álava
- Eskualdea / Comarca: Rioja Alavesa

Government
  - Mayor: Miguel A. Fernández (PP)

Area
  - Total: 8.92 km^{2} (3.44 sq mi)
- Elevation: 535 m (1,755 ft)

Population (2025-01-01)
  - Total: 192
  - Density: 21.5/km^{2} (55.7/sq mi)
- Time zone: UTC+1 (CET)
  - Summer (DST): UTC+2 (CEST)
- Postal code: 01309
- Official language(s): Basque, Spanish
- Website: Official website

Navaridas is a town and municipality located in the province of Álava, in the Basque Country, northern Spain.
