= Bargota =

Town and municipality in Navarre, Spain

Coordinates: 42°33′40″N 2°18′43″W

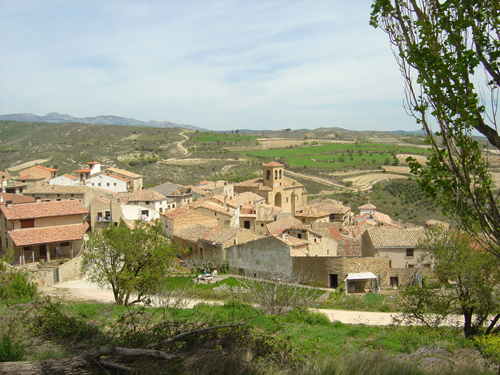

Bargota's coat of arms

Bargota is a town and municipality located in the province and autonomous community of Navarra, northern Spain.
