= Lazagurría =

- Municipality
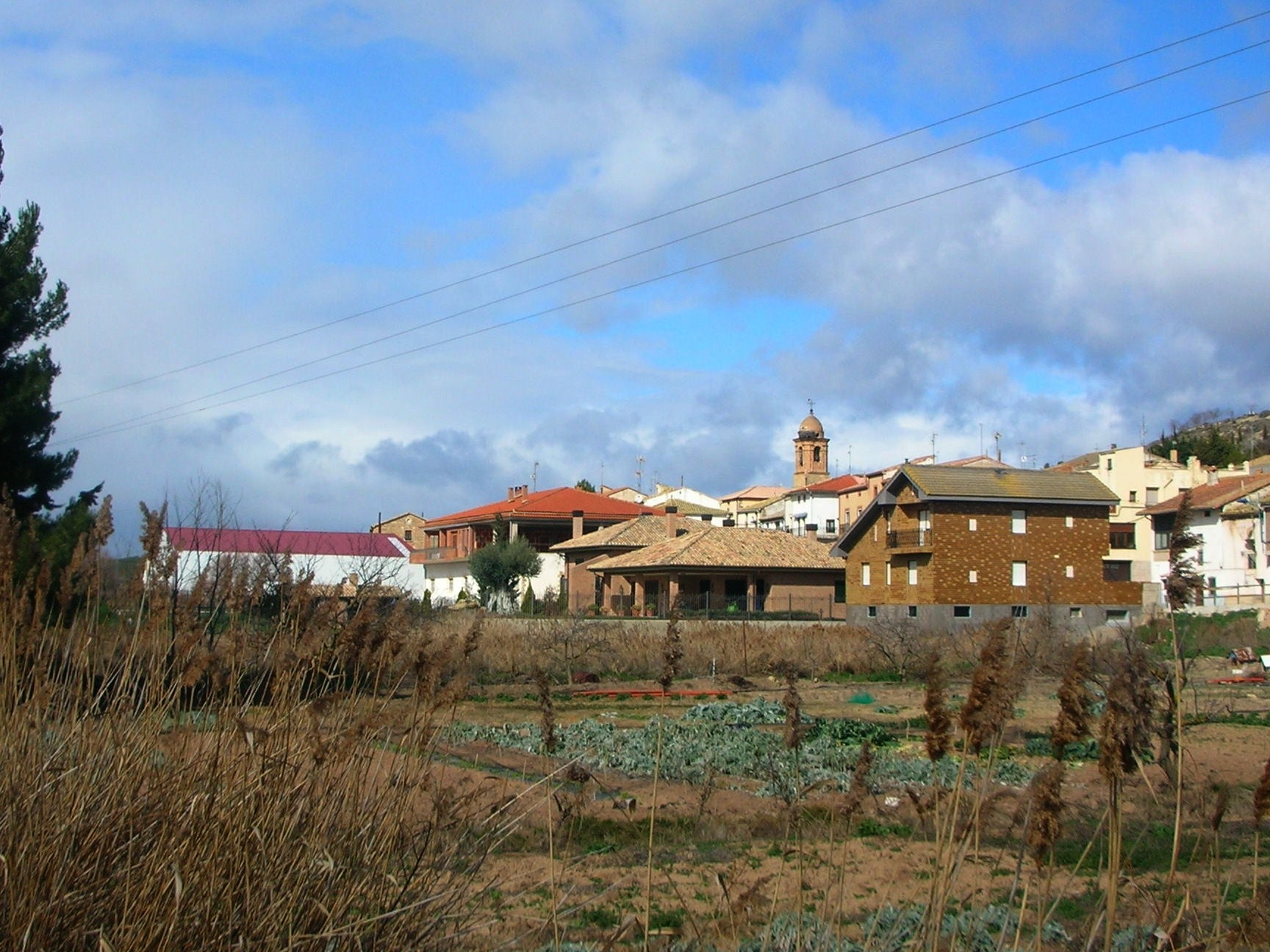
- View of Lazagurría

- Coat of arms
- Interactive map of Lazagurría
- Coordinates: 42°29′34″N 2°14′23″W
- Country: Spain
- Autonomous Community: Navarre
- Merindad: Estella

Government
  - Mayor: Máximo López Carro

Area
  - Total: 17.01 km^{2} (6.57 sq mi)
- Elevation: 392 m (1,286 ft)

Population (2025-01-01)
  - Total: 170
  - Density: 10/km^{2} (26/sq mi)
- Demonym(s): Zagurriano, Zagurriana
- Time zone: UTC+1 (CET)
  - Summer (DST): UTC+2 (CEST)
- Postal code: 31588
- Official language(s): Basque, Spanish

Lazagurría (Basque Elizagorria) is a village and municipality in the province and autonomous community of Navarre, northern Spain.
