= Martín Fernández de Navarrete =

Historian, politician, Spanish Navy officer, and nobleman (1765–1844)

The Most Excellent Martín Fernández de Navarrete
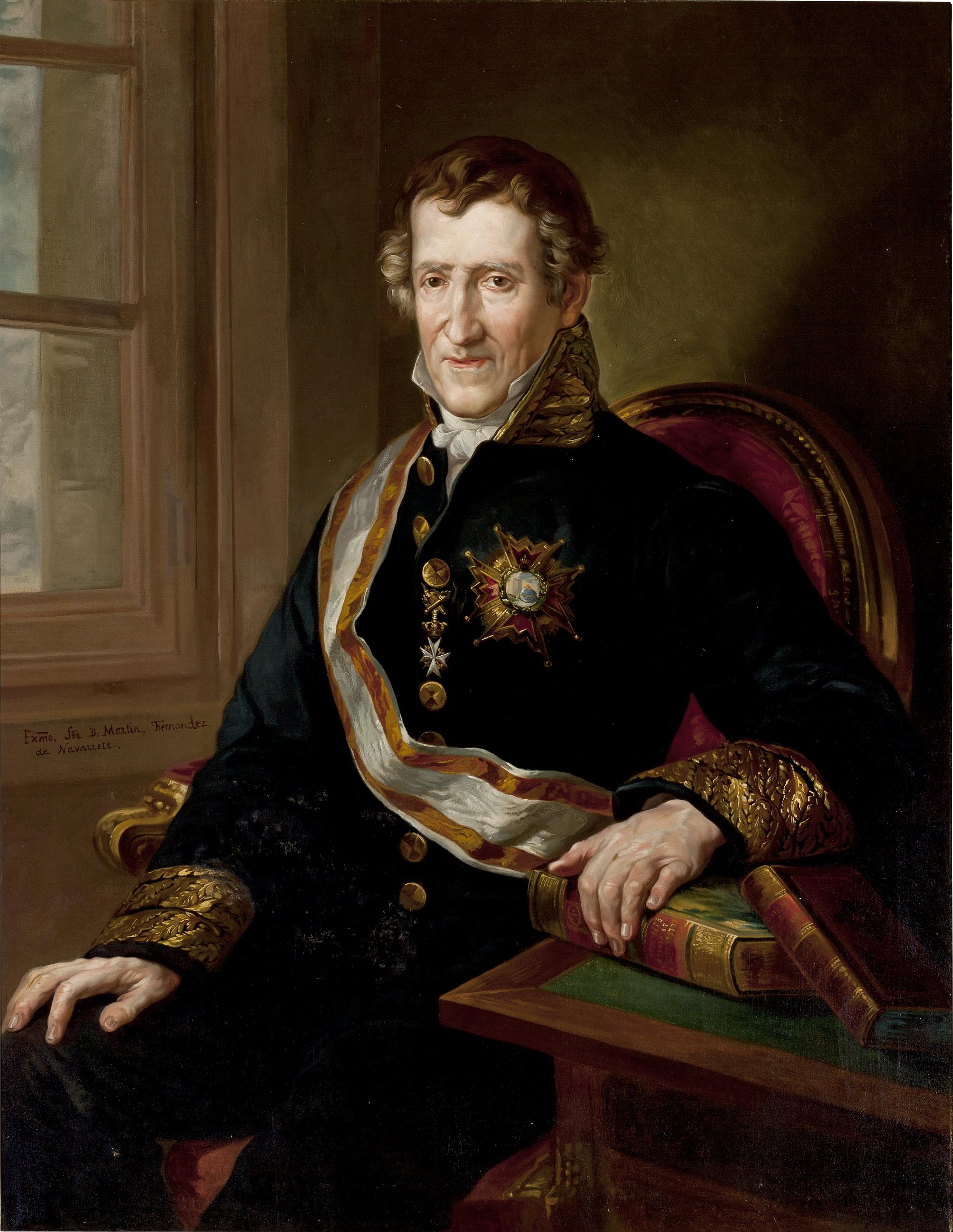
- de Navarrete c. 1881
- Born: Martín Fernández de Navarrete y Ximénez de Tejada; 9 November 1765; Ábalos, Spain
- Died: 8 October 1844 (aged 78); Madrid, Spain
- Other names: "El Marino Historiador," informal appellation assigned for his 5-volume Collection of the voyages...
- Known for: Colección de los viages y descubrimientos que hicieron por mar los españoles desde fines del siglo XV (Collection of the voyages and discoveries made by the spaniards since the late 15th century)
- Scientific career
- Fields: Naval officer, Senator, Historian

Seat D of the Real Academia Española
- In office 31 January 1797 – 8 October 1844
- Preceded by: Enrique Ramos
- Succeeded by: Manuel López Cepero

Martín Fernández de Navarrete y Ximénez de Tejada (November 9, 1765 – October 8, 1844), was a Spanish nobleman, naval officer, and historian. Today he is principally remembered for his historical research concerning the expeditions and scientific findings carried out by Spaniards during the "Age of Discovery".

As a historian, Navarrete rediscovered Bartolomé de las Casas's abstract of the journal that Christopher Columbus kept of his first voyage (1492–1493). By appointment of the Spanish Crown, he compiled a vast historical work, Colección de los viages y descubrimientos que hicieron por mar los españoles desde fines del siglo XV ("Collection of the voyages and discoveries made by the Spaniards since the late 15th century"), which was published in five volumes that appeared between 1825 and 1837. That work, which was praised by Alexander von Humboldt, earned Navarrete the byname of El Marino Historiador ("The Mariner Historian").

Navarrete fought with the Spanish navy in the Peninsular War (1807–1813). After that war, he was accused in some circles of having collaborated with the French occupation under Joseph Bonaparte. However, he went on to become a senator and director of the Spanish Royal Academy of History (1824-1844). He was also a member of several other major Spanish and international academies of arts and sciences.

== Early life and military career ==
He was born at Ábalos, La Rioja in 1765 in Abalos Palace, the main Fernández de Navarrete family property in La Rioja region. This building currently houses his personal archive, that includes samples of his epistolary relation with some of the most important personalities of the time like Alexander Von Humboldt, Washington Irving or Gaspar Melchor de Jovellanos

His grandfather was Martin Fernández de Navarrete y Zárate (born 1684 in Navarrete) knight of the order of Calatrava, who married Catalina Ramírez de la Piscina, descendant of the king of Navarre and the Cid .

His father was Francisco Fernández de Navarrete Ramirez de la Piscina. His mother was Catalina Ximénez de Tejada y Argaiz, daughter of the Marquess of Ximénez de Tejada and niece of the 69th Grand Master of the Sovereign Military Order of Malta, Francisco Ximénez de Tejada (1700-1774)

Martin Fernández de Navarrete Ximénez de Tejada received part of his education at the Real Seminario de Nobles de Vergara - the Royal Seminary of Nobles located in Vergara. He entered the navy in 1780 and was later engaged in the unsuccessful operations in 1782 during the Great Siege of Gibraltar, and afterwards in the suppression of Algerine pirates.

Health compelled him for a time to withdraw from active service, but he devoted this forced leisure to historical research, and in 1789 he was appointed by the crown to examine the national archives relating to the maritime history of Spain.

== Marine historian ==
He rejoined the navy in 1793 and was present at the siege of Toulon. Afterwards he received command of a frigate.

From 1797 to 1808 he held in succession various important posts in the ministry of marine.

In 1808 the French invasion caused him serious problems, as Napoleon Bonaparte instituted his brother Joseph Bonaparte as king of Spain during the French invasion of Spain (1808-1814).

The French invaders wanted Martín Fernández Navarrete as Minister of the Navy, but Navarrete refused the offer.

This instability finally led to Martin Fernandez de Navarrete to withdraw from Madrid, and made him participate in the Cortes of Cádiz, in Andalusia, where the new Spanish Constitution was being voted while most of the rest of Spain was under occupation by Napoleon's troops .

The rest of his life was entirely devoted to literature and politics. In 1819 appeared, as an appendix to the Academy's edition of Don Quixote, his Vida de Miguel de Cervantes Saavedra, and in 1825 the first two volumes of the Colección de los viajes y descubrimientos que hicieron por mar los españoles desde el fin del siglo XV (3rd vol., 1829; 4th vol., 1837) -Collection of the voyages and discoveries made by the spaniards since the late 15th century.

This vast work was a compendium of the Spanish naval discoveries in America and Asia, that led to the construction of the Spanish Empire.

In 1837 he was made a senator. In 1824 he was appointed director of the Spanish Royal Academy of History. At the time of his death in Madrid in 1844 he was assisting in the preparation of the Colección de Documentos Inéditos para la Historia de España. His Disertación sobre la Historia de la Nautica (1846) and Biblioteca Maritima Española (1851). were published posthumously.

Martín Fernández de Navarrete Ximénez de Tejada portrait painted by the son of great painter Vicente López Portaña is presently presiding the Board of Trustees' hall of the Naval Museum of Madrid.

Another portrait of Martin Fernández de Navarrete Ximénez de Tejada presides the main staircase of the Royal Academy of History in Madrid.

== Jobs and distinctions ==
- Knight of the Order of Malta
- Spanish State Counselor
- Spanish Senator
- Director of the Spanish Royal Academy of History (1824-1844)
- Vice-protector of the Royal Academy of Noble Arts of San Fernando
- Dean of the Royal Spanish Academy of Language
- Born member of the Spanish Admiralty Board
- Great Cross of the Royal American Order of Ysabel la Católica
- Member of the Council of Spain
- Member of the Council of the Indies
- Director of Spanish Hydrographic Depot
- Martin Fernández de Navarrete Ximénez de Tejada was also a member of the following academies:
- Individual of the Institut de France
- Commander of the Legion of Honor of France
- Academy of History of Rio de Janeiro
- Academy of San Lucas of Rome
- Academy of Sciences of Turin
- Academy of Berlin
- Antiquarian Societies of Copenhagen and Normandy
- American Philosophical Society
- Academies of Geography of Paris and London
- Sociedad Economica Matritense

and of several other Academies of the Kingdom of Spain

== Main works ==
- Fernández de Navarrete, Martín (1825–37) Colección de los viages y descubrimientos que hicieron por mar los españoles desde fines del siglo XV: con varios documentos inéditos concernientes á la historia de la marina castellana y de los establecimientos españoles en Indias, 5 vols., Madrid: Imprensa Real. v.1 (1825), v.2 (1825), v.3 (1829), v.4 (1837), v. 5 (1837)
- Vida de Miguel de Cervantes Saavedra, escrita e ilustrada con varias noticias y documentos inéditos pertenecientes a la historia y literatura de su tiempo. Madrid, 1819.[1]
- Disertación sobre la historia de la náutica. Madrid, 1846.
- Biblioteca marítima española. Obra póstuma del señor Martín Fernández de Navarrete. Madrid: Viuda de Calero, 1851, 2 volúmenes.
- Viajes de Américo Vespucio. Ed. Espasa-Calpe. Madrid, 2003. ISBN 8467011149.
- Colección de Documentos Inéditos para la Historia de España. Inacabado. Madrid, 1844.
- Disertación Histórica sobre la parte que tuvieron los españoles en las guerras de Ultramar o de las Cruzadas [...]. Tomo V. Real Academia de la Historia. Madrid . 1816

== Bibliography ==
- Fernández de Navarrete, Martín (1825–37) Colección de los viages y descubrimientos que hicieron por mar los españoles desde fines del siglo XV: con varios documentos inéditos concernientes á la historia de la marina castellana y de los establecimientos españoles en Indias, 4 vols., Madrid: Imprensa Real.v.1 (1825), v.2 (1825), v.3 (1829), v.4 (1837).
- Cáseda Teresa, J. F. Martín Fernández de Navarrete y la literatura de su tiempo. Instituto de Estudios Riojanos. Gibierno de la Rioja. Logroño, 2000. ISBN 84-89362-86-6
- Juretschke, Hans. Los Afrancesados en la Guerra de la Independencia. Biblioteca de la Historia de España. SARPE, Madrid 1986. ISBN 84-7700-021-2
- Pando Villarroya, José Luis de. Colón y Fernández de Navarrete. Pando Ediciones . Madrid. 1984. ISBN 84-398-1598-0
- Instituto de Historia y Cultura Naval. Martín Fernández de Navarrete. El marino Historiador. (1765-1844). Cuadernos Monográficos del Instituto de Historia y Cultura Naval. Nº 24 Madrid. 1995.
