= Kripan =

- Municipality
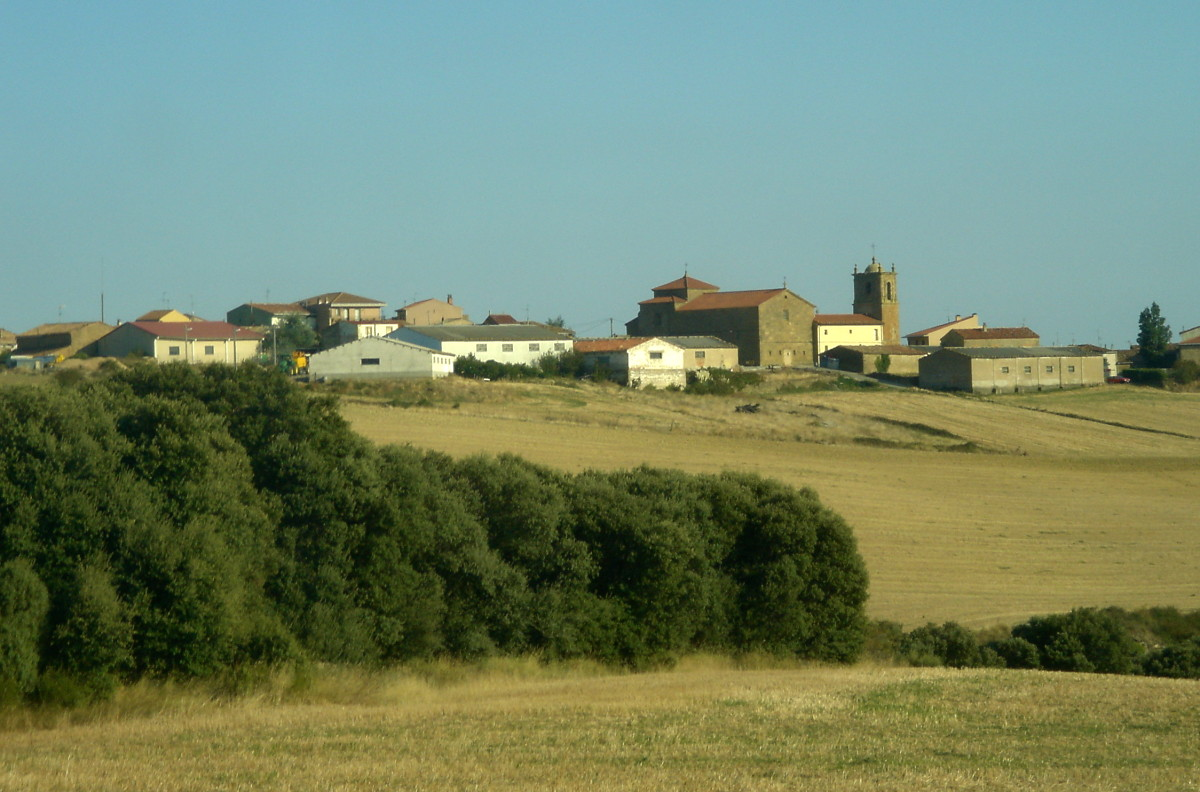

- Coat of arms

- Location of Kripan within the Basque Country
- Coordinates: 42°36′N 2°31′W
- Country: Spain
- Autonomous Community: Basque Country
- Province: Álava
- Comarca: Rioja Alavesa

Government
  - Mayor: Joseba Fernández Calleja

Area
  - Total: 12.52 km^{2} (4.83 sq mi)
- Elevation (AMSL): 693 m (2,274 ft)

Population (2025-01-01)
  - Total: 174
  - Density: 13.9/km^{2} (36.0/sq mi)
- Time zone: UTC+1 (CET)
  - Summer (DST): UTC+2 (CEST (GMT +2))
- Postal code: 01308
- Area code: +34 (Spain) + 94 (Biscay)

Kripan (Spanish: Cripán) is a town and municipality located in the province of Álava, in the Basque Country, northern Spain.
