= Lapuebla de Labarca =

Coordinates: 42°29.68′N 2°34.51′W

- Municipality
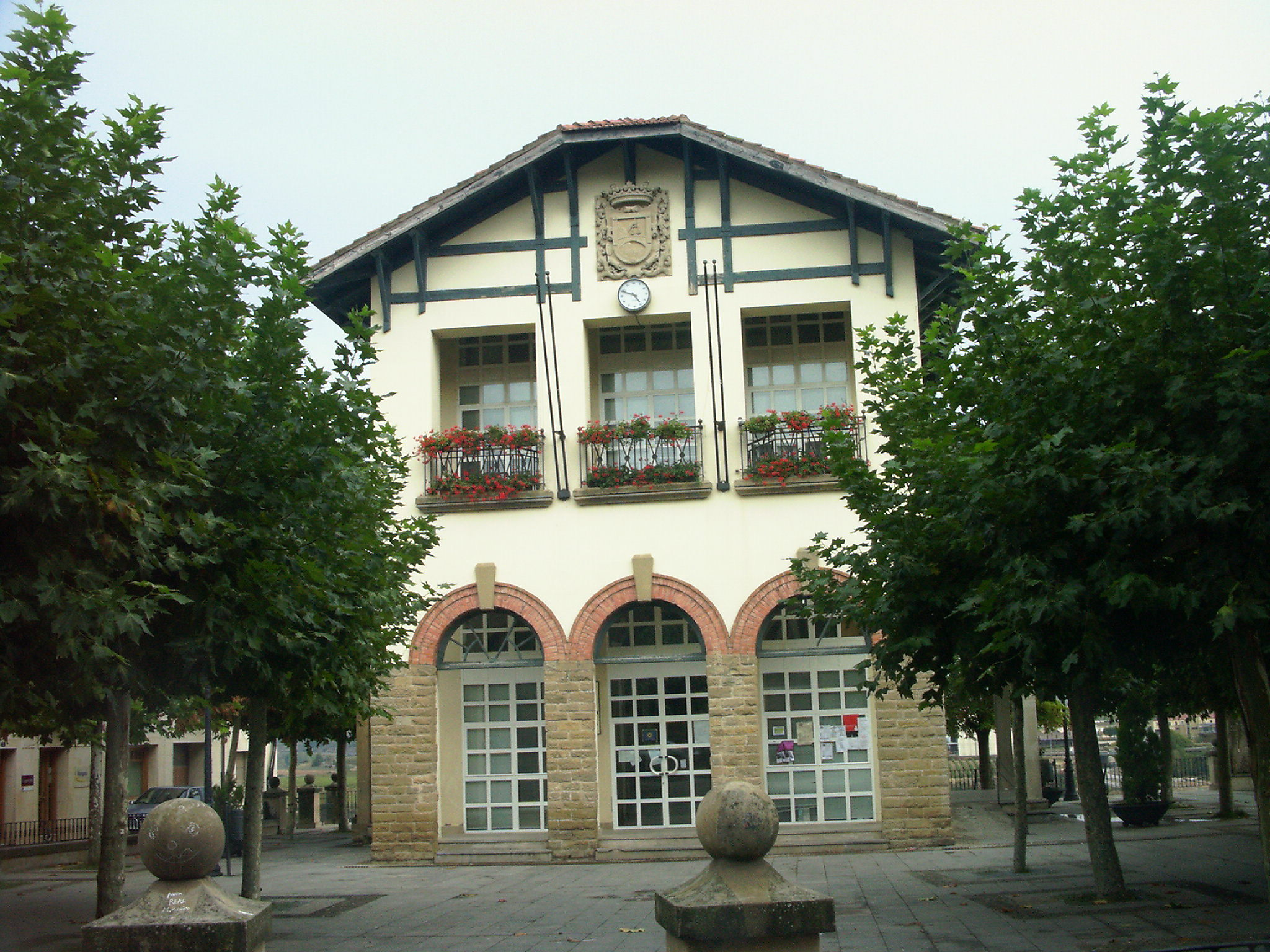

- Coat of arms
- Interactive map of Lapuebla de Labarca

Government
  - Type: Mayor-Council
  - Mayor: María Teresa Córdoba Fernández (LPA)

Population (2025-01-01)
  - Total: 895
- Time zone: UTC+1 (CET)
  - Summer (DST): UTC+2 (CEST)
- Postal code: 01306
- Official language(s): Basque; Spanish

Lapuebla de Labarca is a town and municipality located in the province of Álava, in the Basque Country, northern Spain. Today Lapuebla de Labarca is a town of 868 inhabitants, dynamic and marked by its agricultural economy related to the production and sale of wine of Denomination of Origin Rioja Alavesa.

== Etymology ==
Lapuebla de Labarca owes its name to the fact that at that point of the Ebro river there was anciently a boat that was used to ford the river. The use of such boat disappeared with the construction of a suspension bridge across the river. The current bridge which is made of cement, dates from 1939 and is still used to cross the river.

== History ==
The town was born as a necessity of the town of Laguardia, (located 6 km away and neighborhood until well into the seventeenth century), of having a boat passage that would communicate the Sonsierra of the Kingdom of Navarre with Castile.

Lapuebla de Labarca, which is undoubtedly one of the youngest towns of Rioja Alavesa, named after the boat with which that river named before was crossed and subsequently replaced by a wire suspension bridge, until it was built the one used nowadays in 1939.

At first, its population was poor -in 1369 had only 5 neighbors who paid contribution-. Its progressive increase in population was due to its good location, appropriate climate and the richness of its soil fundamentally. Thus, in the seventeenth century King Philip IV gives the town its independence from Laguardia and gives the title of town, on June 11, 1631.

The primitive population of Lapuebla de Labarca developed around the church. In the old town, the main street forms a horseshoe that opens next to the church. From this Lapuebla de Labarca started to expand, in the nineteenth century to the neighborhood of "El Castillo" at the north and in the twentieth century another expansion that developed westward from the square “El Plano”. The neighborhood of the wineries, popularly known as "Cuevas" is at the top of the village.

Today Lapuebla de Labarca is a town of 868 inhabitants, dynamic and marked by its agricultural economy related to the production and sale of wine Denomination of Origin Rioja Alavesa. It also has companies directly related to winemaking.

Population of Lapuebla de Labarca
1897	1900	1910	1920	1930	1940	1950	1960	1970	1981	1991	2001	2006	2009	2015
770	810	811	800	865	886	899	829	774	763	814	852	860	877	861

== Location ==
Lapuebla de Labarca is located at the south of Alava, Rioja Alavesa is bounded to the north by the Sierra de Cantabria and to the south by the river Ebro.

Settled in the foothills south of "Cerro de Misamayor" on a craggy area called "Los Riscos" practically hung over the Ebro river, at an altitude of 429m. over the sea level and of only 6 km of extension, It is the smallest municipality of Rioja Alavesa: Lapuebla de Labarca. The capital of the Basque Country,

== Climate ==
The four seasons are given in this region of the Rioja Alavesa. A Winter and summer with very harsh temperatures as cold in winter and temperatures between 28 and 35 degrees in summer, which favors the daily bath in the pools of the village or picnics beside the Ebro, in the park of La Póveda .. and a more pleasant temperatures in spring and autumn, moments that can be harnessed to enjoy pleasant walks or bike along the roads of the municipality of Lapuebla de Labarca and its surroundings. The landscape also varies with the seasons, so the traveler can find a "naked" station where the vineyards are parallel or perpendicular lines revealing the chalky soil of this area during the winter. Instead, in the spring, in the middle of April, May, June and even July, the vines are dressed in an intense light green that changes shades to become dark green in late August and September, to the collection of grape. But it is in autumn when the land is dressed in ocher, yellow and red that with blue skies and wooly acquires an incomparable beauty. It is for this reason and because at this time the work of picking grapes and making wine the traditional way are given by small and medium vintners making becomes more advisable to visit this area.

== Festivities ==
- Day open cellar: It is celebrated on the second Saturday of February each year. All people who want to know the culture of wine can do this day where wineries open to the public, guided tours are made, wine tastings and other work are made, all related to the world of wine. In the 2011 edition they went to Lapuebla de Labarca more than four thousand people to spend a fantastic day with each other and with the precious wine that is made here, the wine.
- On May 15, San Isidro, the patron saint of farmers, held a festival are organized by PEÑA SAN BARTOLOME, years were lost by the council but recently recovered by the rock and now organizes and pays for this.
- On August 24 are celebrated the day of Saint Bartholomew. On the eve of the lower village youth Bartolo (doll festival) of the upper town where the wineries. From there the lively kalejira goes to the City Council to place the doll, the ikurriña and Cuba on the balcony of the town hall and throw the txupinazo start of the holidays. During the holidays 'Bartolo' you will witness everything that happens from that balcony as a 'president' of the celebrations. The last day and at the conclusion of the festivities takes place the so-called 'burial Cuba' in which 'Bartolo' performs the reverse route to the first day to return to the wineries of the people are the 'Poor my'. Zurracapote is often spread among visitors. They are famous for its running of the bulls.
- Another significant festival of the village is the pilgrimage to La Poveda, a wooded area near the Ebro River in the traditional sartenada is dealt.

== Celebrities born in Lapuebla de Labarca ==
- Pedro Córdoba Samaniego:

Director and composer military bands. He was born in Lapuebla de Labarca, Alava, on 19 October 1871. Endowed with great powers for music, although he began studying at age 17, one of his teachers was Enrique Barrera, at 20 he was conductor and 25, senior musician Army. In 1922, he directed the Band of the Foreign Legion, which remained at high artistic level She was among the best- and was frequently required to act in diverse populations; in that year, in October, he developed several concerts with flattering success in Zaragoza, during the festival of Pilar; one collaborated with the Orfeón Donostiarra in the interpretation of La Damnation de Faust, Berlioz, and the vibrant and martial Legionnaires Song. He approached the opera; the first work that premiered was the operetta The Prince Pius, which followed the boy Brenes, The damn drink, The National Aviary, Children of the air, the tangles of Zambuco, cars, Chinita ... Some he wrote in collaboration with other teachers, Foglietti, Moon, Chueca; with the latter composer composed Chinita, lyrical farce in one act, book Luis Ibanez Villaescusa, which premiered at the Eslava Theatre in Madrid, on December 8, 1906. He earned success and score, consisting of five numbers, the Pasodoble of goats and Villancico or Couplets of zambomba highlighted.

- Salvador Velilla Córdoba: contemporary writer and newspaper columnist.
- Theophilus Aguayo: Writer, priest and historian, best known for the inhabitants of the whole region.
- José María Pérez Medrano (1920-2008): professional footballer in the 1940s and 1950s, who played for Real Sociedad

== Legends ==
One of the legends of Lapuebla de Labarca deals with the Virgin of Assa. That even belonging to the region of Assa, always appeared in Lapuebla. After seeing that the Virgin disappeared, the inhabitants of Assa drove her back to the town. Still, the Virgin appeared mysteriously in Lapuebla de Labarca again and again. Finally, after seeing that the Virgin returned to the town of Lapuebla de Labarca Assa 's neighbors' decided to leave it in the church of Lapuebla, since that was the place where she wanted to be.
