= Baños de Ebro/Mañueta =

Baños de Ebro / Mañueta
- Municipality
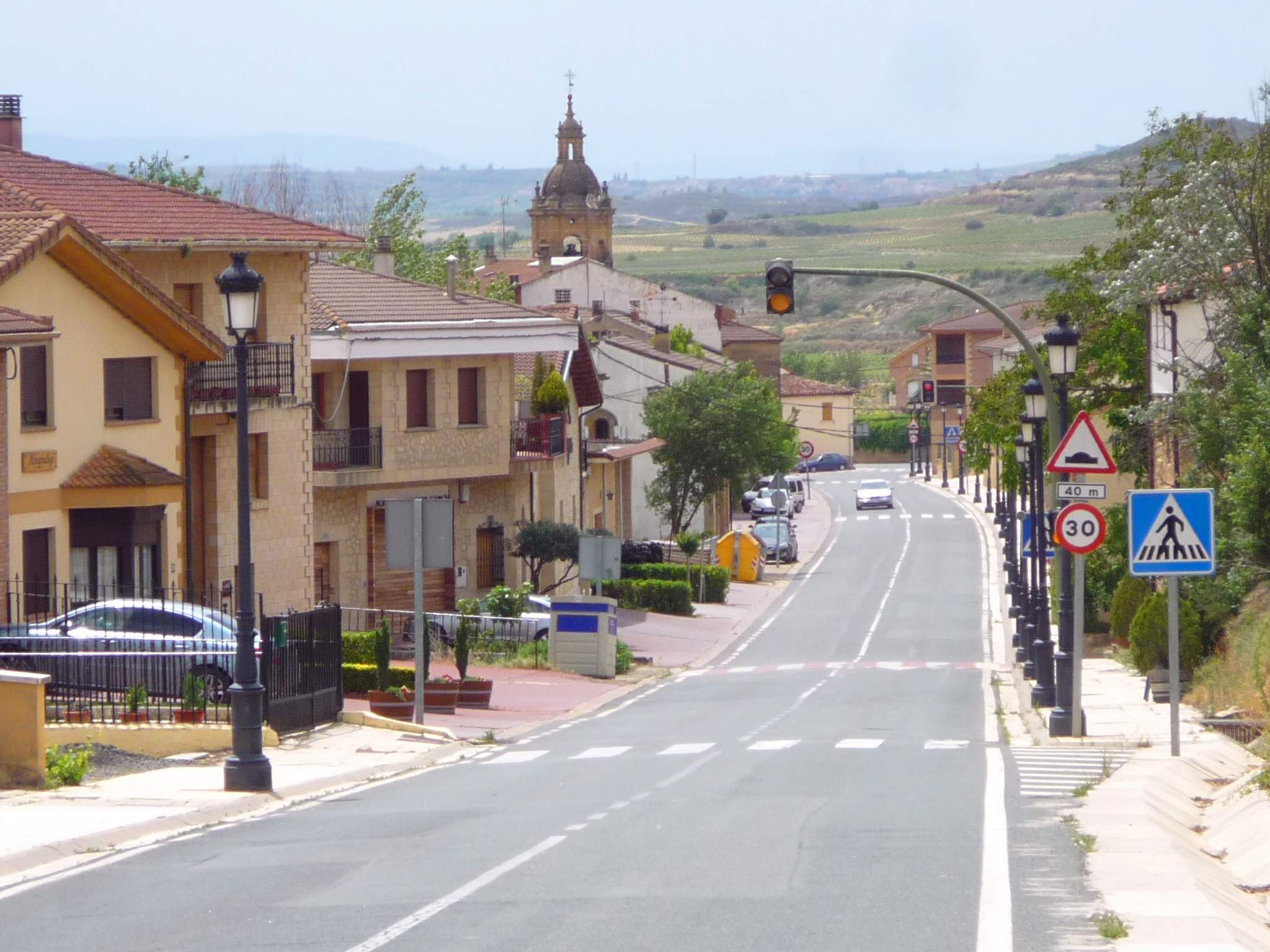

- Coat of arms

- Location of Baños de Ebro/Mañueta within the Basque Country
- Coordinates: 42°32′N 2°40′W
- Country: Spain
- Autonomous community: Basque Country
- Province: Araba/Álava
- Eskualdea / Comarca: Rioja Alavesa

Government
  - Mayor: Roberto Blanco Pascual

Area
  - Total: 9.46 km^{2} (3.65 sq mi)
- Elevation: 421 m (1,381 ft)

Population (2025-01-01)
  - Total: 286
- Postal code: 01307
- Website: www.banosdeebro.com

Baños de Ebro in Spanish or Mañueta in Basque is a town and municipality located in the province of Álava, in the Basque Country, northern Spain.
