= Villabuena de Álava/Eskuernaga =

Coordinates: 42°33′00″N 2°39′56″W

- Municipality
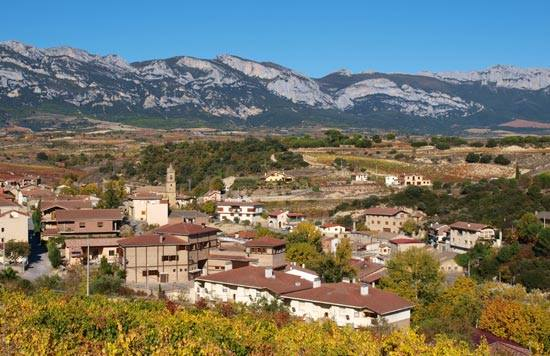
- General view

- Coat of arms

- Location within Basque Country Villabuena de Álava/Eskuernaga (Spain)
- Country: Spain
- Autonomous community: Basque Country
- Province: Araba/Álava
- Eskualdea / Comarca: Rioja Alavesa
- Founded: 1661

Government
  - Mayor: Iñaki Pérez Berrueco (PNV)
  - Mayor's term: 2019

Area
  - Total: 8.48 km^{2} (3.27 sq mi)
- Elevation: 483 m (1,585 ft)

Population (2025-01-01)
  - Total: 276
  - Density: 32.5/km^{2} (84.3/sq mi)
- Time zone: UTC+1 (CET)
  - Summer (DST): UTC+2 (CEST)
- Postal code: 01307
- Website: Official website

Villabuena de Álava in Spanish or Eskuernaga in Basque is a village and municipality located in the province of Álava, in the Basque Country (Basque Autonomous Community) of northern Spain. It is famous for its production of top quality wines. The village has 48 wineries ranging from small family-owned businesses to larger bulk-production wineries. The centre of the village contains one of the oldest and most decorated churches in the Basque region, nearby is located Hotel Viura, a boutique hotel.

== Civic architecture ==
Villabuena features long, parallel streets, which follow the contours of the river valley, where the parish church stands. One of the outstanding aspects of the municipality are the many renaissance houses, patrician houses, and small palaces adorned with coats of arms, built between the seventeenth and nineteenth centuries.

=== The House of the Indian ===
The Palace of Peciña Samaniego is known as "The House of the Indian". It was built by Andrés de Bença, between 1608 and 1610, for Pedro Peciña Samaniego, archdeacon and canon of Santiago de Compostela. The palace was built on a rectangular plan with a ground floor, an apartment above, and a tower that is accessed through a semicircular arch. The tower features two more semicircular arches, forming a gallery. A relief decorates the key of the arch. Some of the original Carlists of the region, like Francisco de Paula Rivas, stayed in the apartment.

=== House of the Marqués de Solana ===
Construction of the Marqués de la Solana began in the sixteenth century and continued in the eighteenth century, with the addition of two wings. This resulted in a house with two facades: the older one facing Santiago Street and the second one facing the High Street.

=== The houses on the main street ===
Along Villabuena Street, there are many houses that have carved, decorative elements, such as coats of arms, which identify the original owners. One house has a quartered shield with a bear being attacked by a dog next to a tree, a castle with three towers, and a farmhand holding a horn, with a forest and a wild boar hunting scene in the background.

=== The square and the town hall ===
The Square of the Tree of Gernika is the heart of the town, where a large part of the neighbourhood's social life takes place. The square is bordered by the House of Culture, the pharmacy, the town hall, the church, the House of the Tithes, and the Hotel Viura. The hotel is noted for avant-garde architecture.

The Town Hall is located across from the square. The top storey, facing the square, features the coat of arms of Castilla León.

=== The house on the square ===
On the north side of the square is a three-storey building with a symmetrical frontage, built during the 18th or 19th century. Two carved shields decorate the building: one shows a dog tied to a tree and the other shield has an unknown history.

=== The Dolmen of the Montecillo ===
The Dolmen of the Montecillo was discovered at the end of 2009. This is a megalithic tomb situated in a passage between two vineyards. There are seven similar tombs in the Rioja Alavesa. It is broken and half covered by a morcuero (pile of loose stones). The entry to the passage is hidden due a wall that separates the two vineyards, a situation which has helped to preserve the tomb.

== Religious architecture ==
The parish church, St. Andrew's, is dedicated to the patron saint, San Andreas. It was constructed between 1539 and 1728, and includes Gothic and Baroque architectural features.

Villabuena has three chapels: San Roque (now ruined), San Torcuato, and Santa Maria de Villabuena. The chapel of San Torcuato, dedicated to the patron saint of Villabuena, is on the north side of the town. It is a compact building of rectangular construction.

Santa Maria de Villabuena is also built in rectangular form. It is covered with a fanlight vault in the lower part and the upper part is smooth. It was restored in 1959 but retains many of its Romanesque and Gothic features: a large window, a carved-stone baptismal font, a stone frieze under the pedestal of the Virgin and its image, and a door with a pointed arch.

== Notable residents ==
- Francisco de Paula Rivas, a political Carlist, was born in Villabuena in 1827. He was a senator for Alava in 1871, and was named as a member of the Basque Meetings, created by Manterota in 1870. In 1874 he became President of the General Meetings of Alava (called Juntas Maeztu or Together Maeztu), which had been named by the Carlist pretender. De Paula Rivas acted as a mediator between the different factions of the Carlist movement. After the Meetings dissolved, he resigned was named as a Commissioner in Court and as a representative of Álava in the Basque-Navarrese Meetings.
- Pedro Peciña Samaniego was archdeacon and canon of Santiago de Compostela. At the beginning of the seventeenth century he ordered the construction of a palace in his native locality. After some years the building became known as "The House of the Indian".
- Diego Sánchez Samaniego was a local clergyman during the 16th Century and became Archdeacon of Santiago de Compostela. He was related to many people in the civil and ecclesiastic government of that era. He built a large fortune and wanted to build a chapel in the parish of Villabuena, dedicated to Nuestra Señora del Rosario (Our Lady of the Rosary). He arranged for this in his will and his heirs subsequently gained the rights to the chapel of Saint Peter. This led to a lawsuit with the parish.
