= Samaniego, Spain =

Samaniego
- Municipality
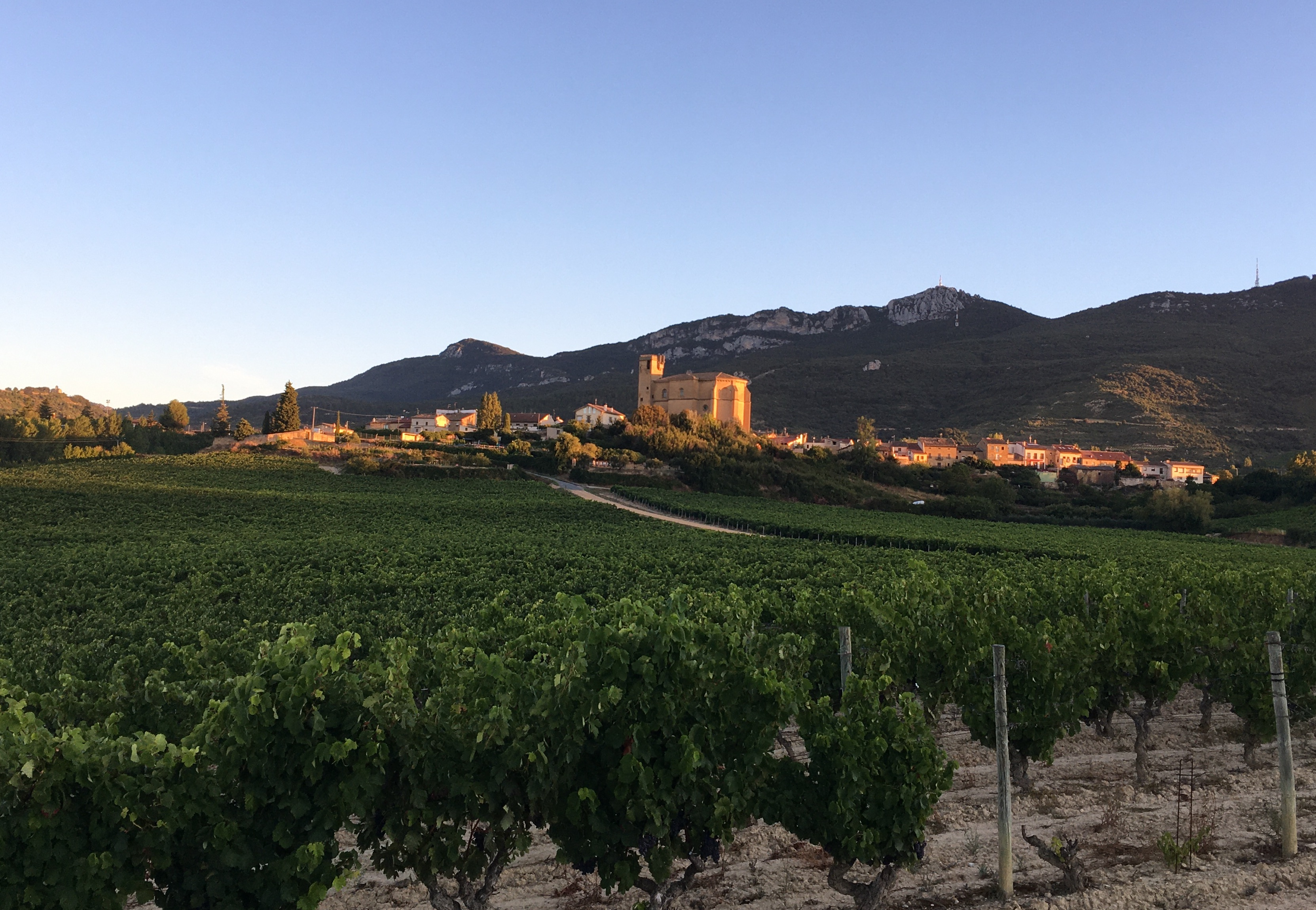
- Samaniego

- Coat of arms

- Location of Samaniego within the Basque Country Samaniego (Spain)
- Coordinates: 42°34′6″N 2°40′55″W
- Country: Spain
- Autonomous community: Basque Country
- Province: Alava
- Eskualdea / Comarca: Rioja Alavesa
- Founded: 1668

Government
  - Mayor: María Pilar Garmendia Iparraguirre (EH Bildu)

Area
  - Total: 10.58 km^{2} (4.08 sq mi)

Population (2023)
  - Total: 305
  - Density: 28.8/km^{2} (74.7/sq mi)
- Time zone: UTC+1 (CET)
  - Summer (DST): UTC+2 (CEST)
- Postal code: 01307
- Official language(s): Basque, Spanish
- Website: Official website

Samaniego (Spanish pronunciation: [samaˈnjeɣo]) is a town and municipality located in the province of Araba (Álava), in the Basque Country, northern Spain.

It forms part of the Rioja Alavesa wine region, and is located 10km west of Laguardia, 45km south of the provincial capital Vitoria-Gasteiz.

The primary industry of the town is winemaking, and a number of wineries are found within the village. The landscape is characterised by the extensive vineyards, and the Sierra de Cantabria mountain range which rises in the north of the municipality.

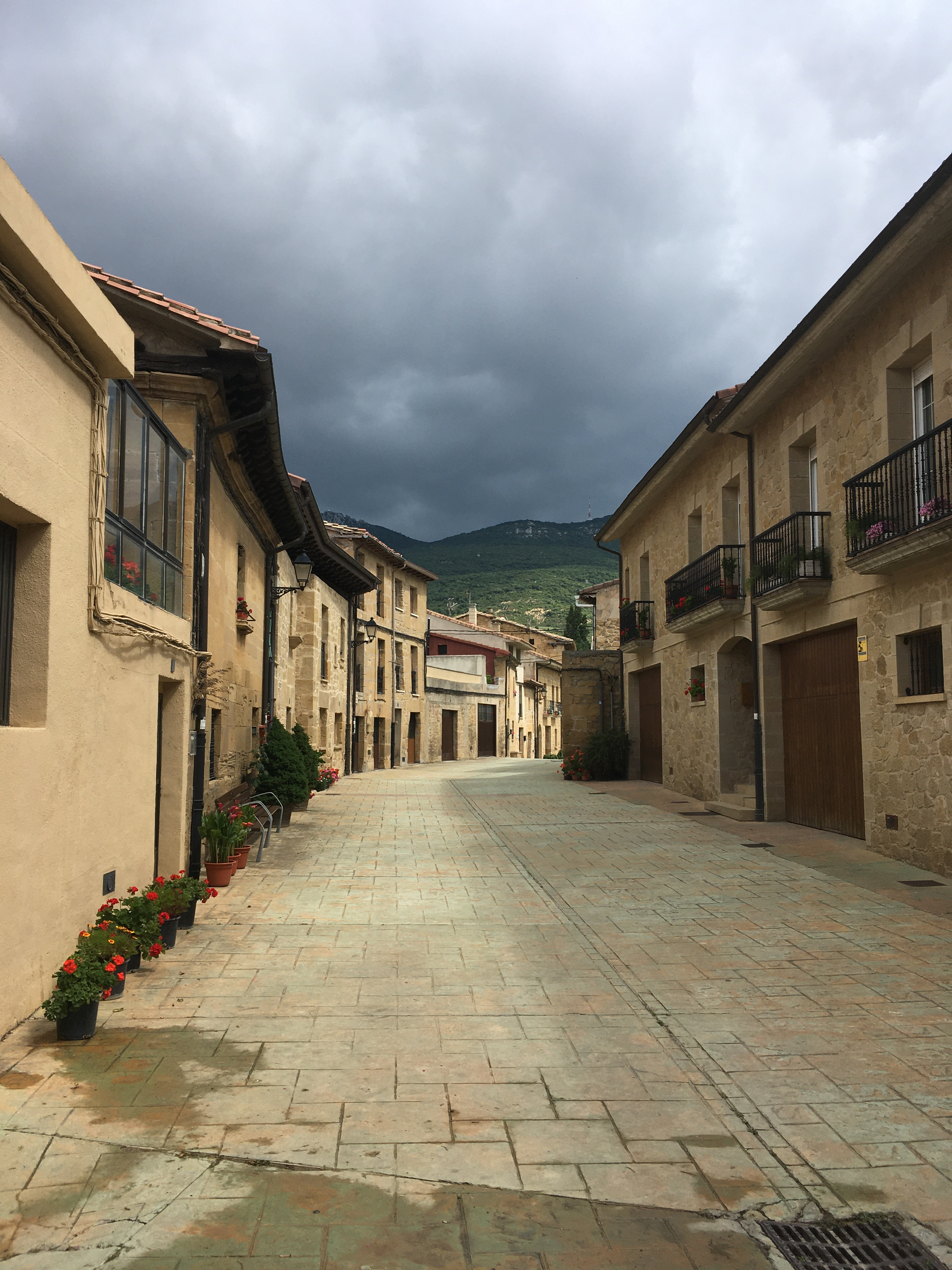
Street in Samaniego, Álava

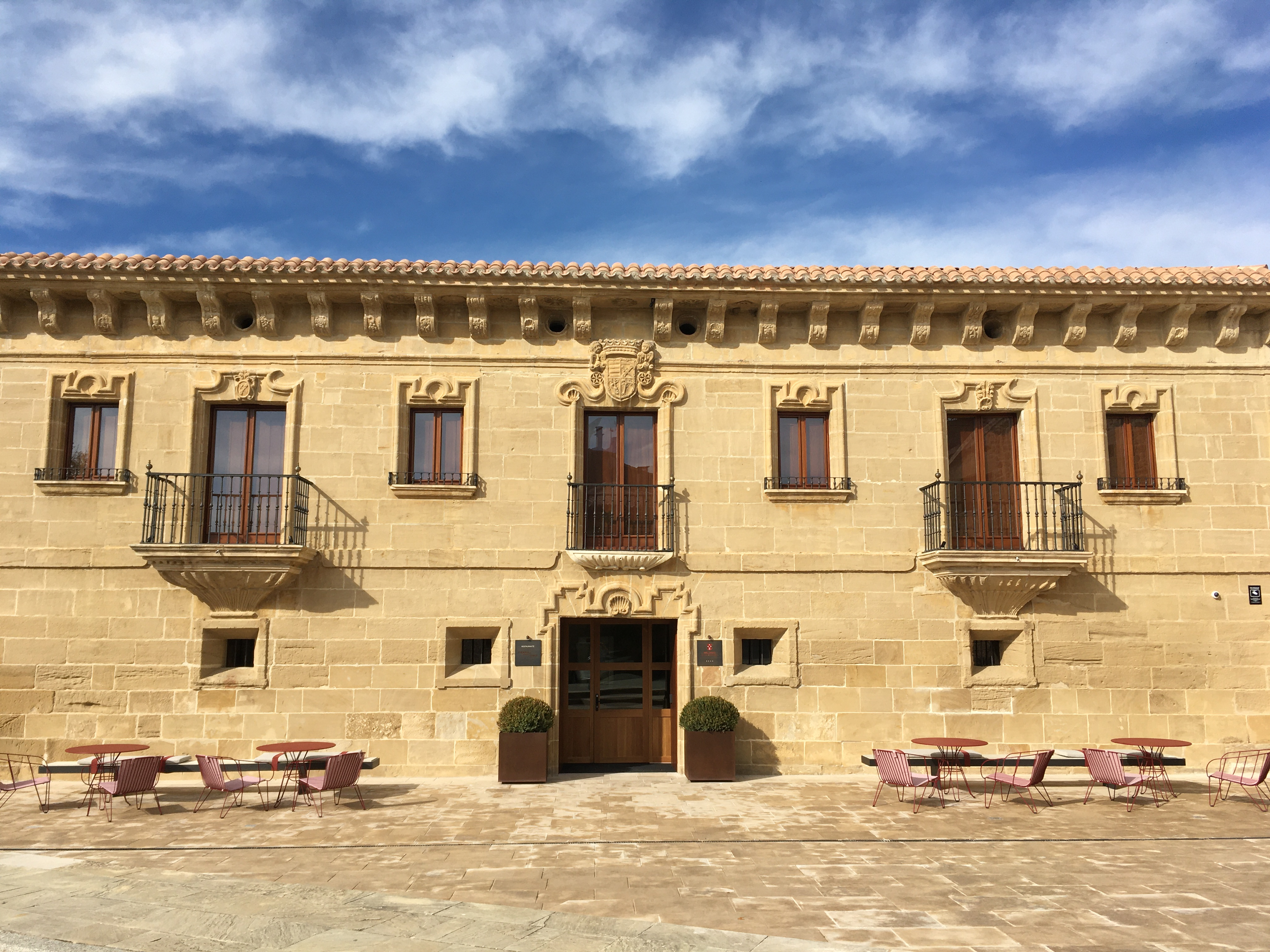
Samaniego Palace, now a hotel
