= Txakoli de Álava =

Coordinates: 43°3′10″N 3°0′10″W

Arabako Txakolina-Txakolí de Álava-Chacolí de Álava DOP
- Wine region
- Arabako Txakolina-Txakolí de Álava-Chacolí de Álava DOP in the province of Álava in the region of Basque Country
- Official name: D.O.P. Arabako Txakolina-Txakolí de Álava-Chacolí de Álava
- Type: Denominación de Origen Protegida (DOP)
- Year established: 2002
- Country: Spain
- No. of vineyards: 95 hectares (235 acres)
- No. of wineries: 6
- Wine produced: 4,592 hectolitres
- Comments: Data for 2016 / 2017

Arabako Txakolina (Basque) or Chacolí de Álava (Spanish) is a Spanish Denominación de origen protegida (Basque: Jatorri Deitura Babestua) for wines from the towns of Amurrio, Llodio, Artziniega, Okondo and Aiara in the province of Álava, Basque Country, Spain.

Txacolí is a thin white acidic wine that can be naturally fizzy and is traditionally served like cider, poured from a height into the glass.

== History ==
This DOP was created in 1989 on the initiative of the five remaining txakoli producers in the province. In that year there were only 5 ha under vines producing txacolí. However, wine had traditionally been made in this manner for hundreds of years and was popular from the Middle Ages up to the end of the 19th century, when the vines were devastated by the phylloxera and the effects of industrialization of the Basque Country.

== Climate ==
- Maximum mean temperature: 18.7 °C
- Minimum mean temperature: 7.5 °C
- Mean temperature: 13.1 °C
- Mean annual rainfall: 900 l

== Authorized grape varieties ==
- Red: Ondarribi Beltza
- White: Hondarrabi Zuri, Petit Manseng, Gros Manseng, Petit Courbu, Sauvignon Blanc, Riesling, and Chardonnay

Almost all the vines are trained on trellises (en espaldera) due to the high levels of rainfall and humidity in the area.

== Vineyards ==
- There are 60 ha of vineyards registered with the D.O.
- Maximum authorized planting density: 2,500 to 3,500 vines/ha
- Maximum authorized yield: 12,500 hg/ha
- Minimum alcohol content: 9.5º%
