= Getariako Txakolina =

Spanish designation for wines

Coordinates: 43°18′5″N 2°12′18″W

Getariako Txakolina–Txakoli de Getaria Chacolí de Getaria DOP
- Wine region
- Getariako Txakolina–Txakoli de Getaria. Chacolí de Getaria DOP in the province of Gipuzkoa in the region of Basque Country
- Official name: D.O.P. Getariako Txakolina–Txakoli de Getaria. Chacolí de Getaria
- Type: Denominación de Origen Protegida (DOP)
- Year established: 1990
- Country: Spain
- No. of vineyards: 427 hectares (1,055 acres)
- No. of wineries: 31
- Wine produced: 15,143 hectolitres
- Comments: Data for 2016 / 2017

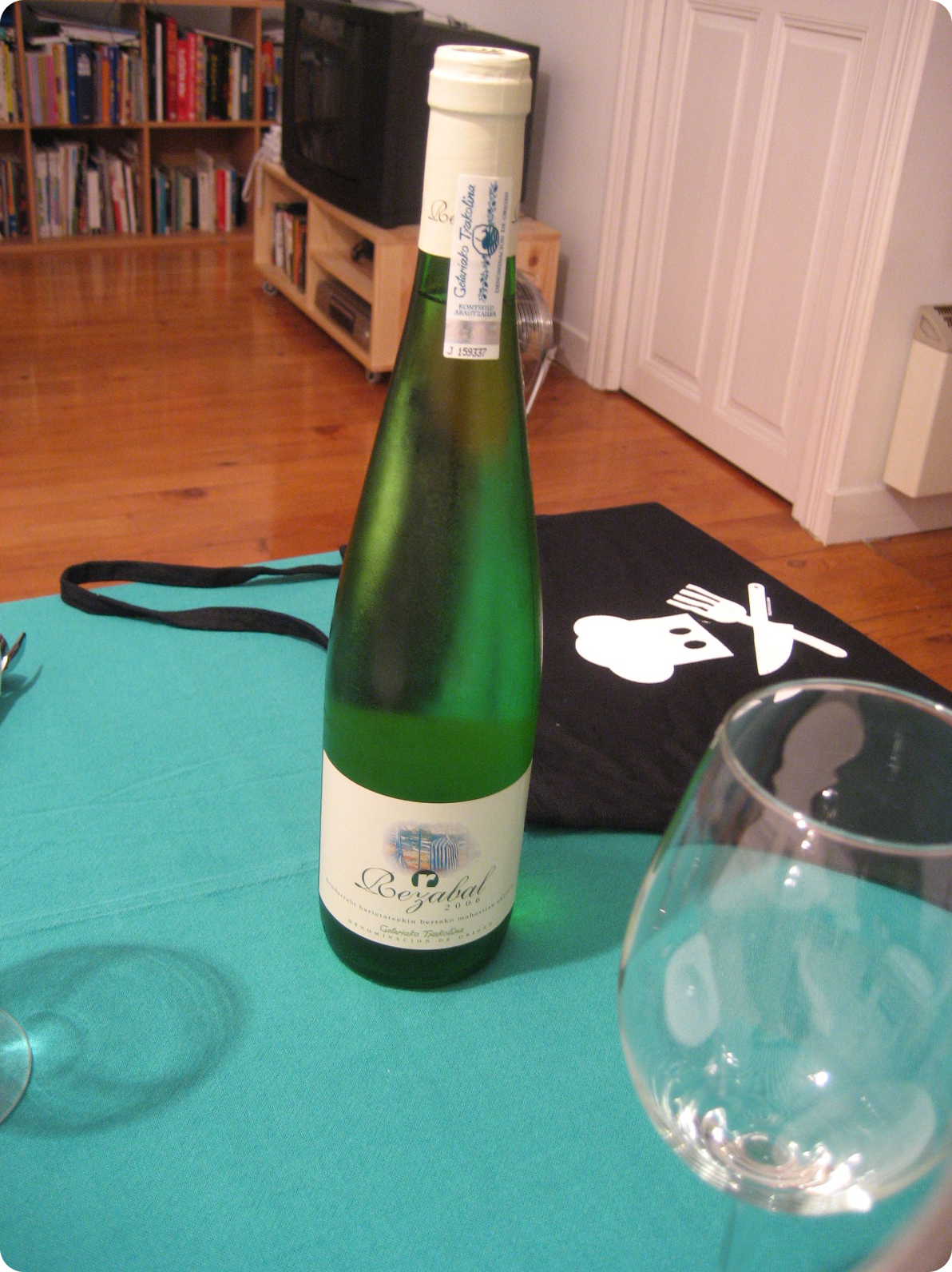
Bottle

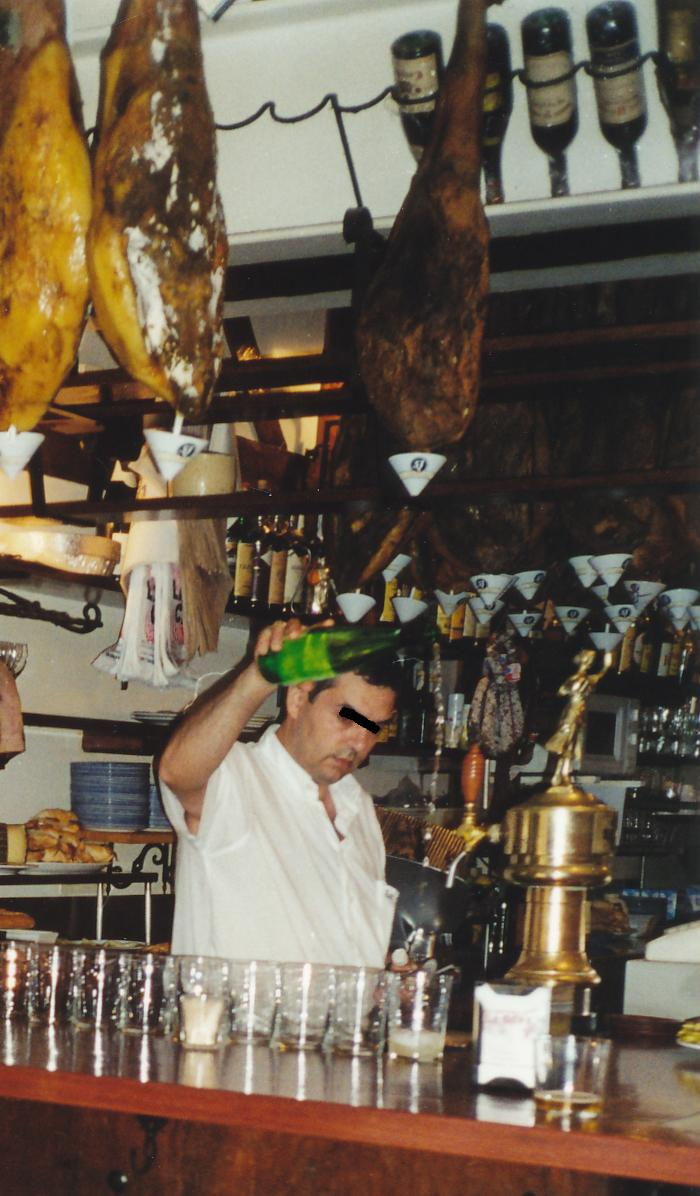
Serving Txakoli in San Sebastián

Txakoli de Getaria–Getariako Txakolina is a Spanish Denominación de Origen Protegida (DOP) (Basque: Jatorri Deitura Babestua) for wines, located around the towns of Getaria and Zarautz, small fishing towns on the coast of the Bay of Biscay, in the province of Gipuzkoa, Basque Country, Spain. A small amount of grapes are also grown around the town of Aia.

Txakoli is a white wine that can be naturally sparkling, and is traditionally served poured from a height into the glass.

== History ==
The Txacolí de Getaria DOP was created in 1990 and covers around 200 hectares of vineyards, down from over 1,000 hectares at the turn of the 20th century. However, wine had traditionally been made in this manner for hundreds of years and was popular from the Middle Ages up to the end of the 19th century, when the vines were devastated by phylloxera and the effects of industrialization of the Basque Country. There are now 17 wineries (bodegas) registered with the DO.

== Climate ==
- Maximum summer temperature: 35 °C
- Minimum winter temperature: 2 °C
- Mean annual sunlight hours: 1,800
- Mean annual rainfall: 1,600 mm

The DOP area is protected from the cold northerly winds by the coastal hills, and enjoys a relatively mild climate, with an average annual temperature of 13.5 °C, and moderate sunlight hours. Hail is a serious risk for the grapes. The rainfall of 1,600 mm/yr is the highest of all the Spanish wine regions.

== Authorised grape varieties ==
The authorised grape varieties are:

- Red: Ondarribi Beltza
- White: Hondarrabi Zuri is preferred; also authorised are Hondarrabi Zuri Zerratia / Petit Courbu, Izkiriota / Gros Manseng, Izkiriota Ttippia /Petit Manseng, Riesling, and Chardonnay

Most of the vines are over 80 years old with roots of up to 10 m deep. The vines being so old, it is possible to lift them off the ground and lay them on stoneware pillars, as is done in Galicia, so that the branches and shoots protect the fruit hanging underneath from the elements. The harvest normally starts at the beginning of October.

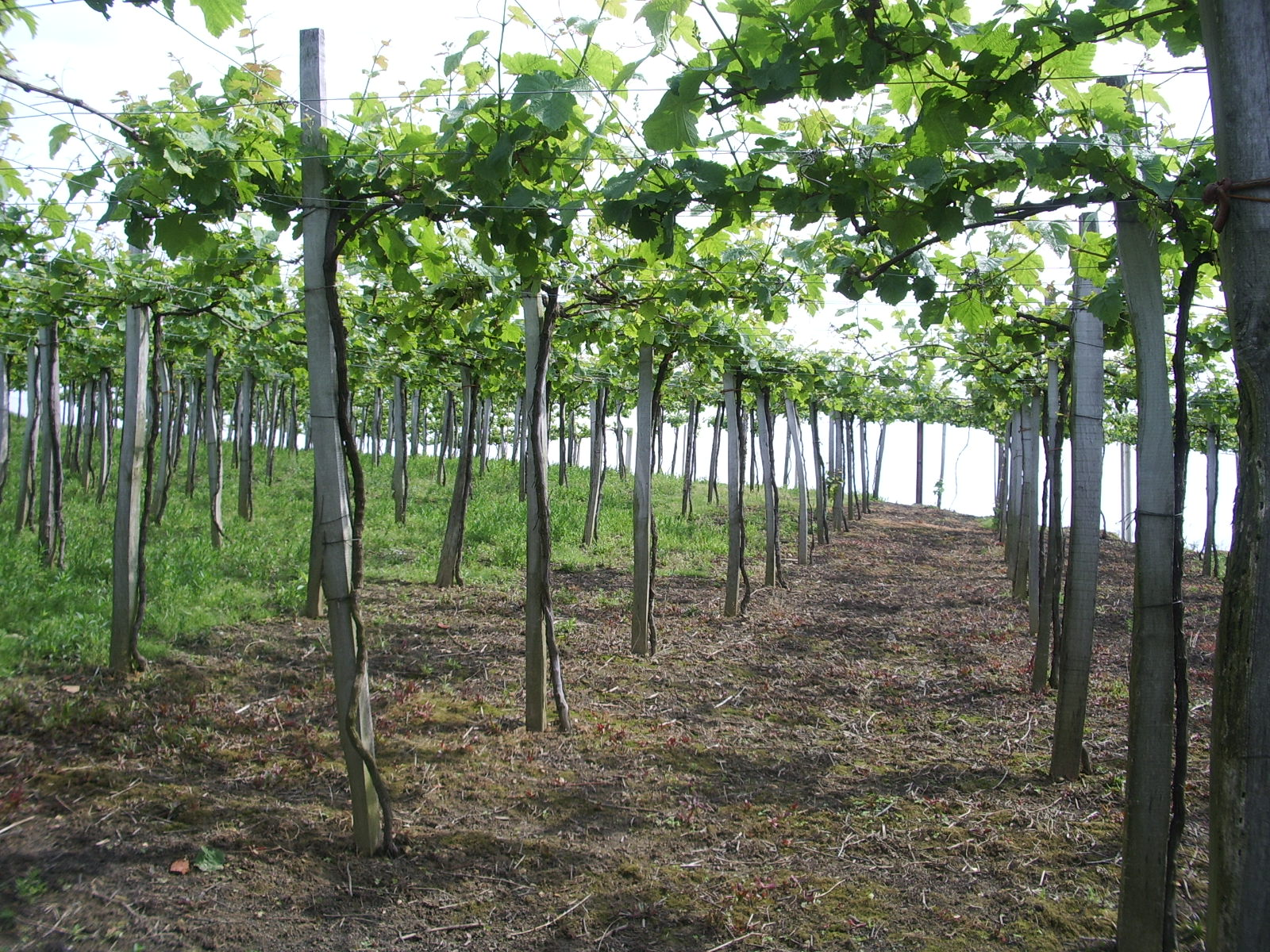
Vineyard between Zarautz and Getaria

== Vineyards ==
The vineyards are all located near the coast where they are protected from the spring frost and from the summer heat. They are planted on the southeast facing slopes for additional protection from the sea breezes and in order to receive more sunlight. The slopes are often very steep and sometimes not terraced. The vines are trained over wires and sometimes over earthen or stone pillars. They can be anywhere between 10 and 100 meters above sealevel. The subsoil is predominantly clay covered by a layer of sandy soil.

- There are 227 ha of vineyards registered with the D.O.
- Permitted maximum yield: 72%
- Maximum authorized yield: 13,000 kg/ha
- Permitted alcohol content: 9.5% - 11.5%

== Wines ==
After harvesting and pressing, the must is left to ferment in stainless steel tanks. Traditionally, and until recently, this was done in oak or chestnut barrels, called kupels, in Basque.

Fermentation lasts 20–25 days and then the txacolí is left to lie on its lees. The CO_{2} prevents oxidation and dissolves the sediments and gives the wine its sparkling characteristic. The wine is not racked so it does not lose its sparkle and is clarified by natural sedimentation by gravity in the tank or barrel.

Traditionally, the wine is tasted on the feast of San Antonio on 17 January, which is known as Txacolí Day (Txacoli Eguna, in Basque).
