= Bizkaiko Txakolina =

Coordinates: 43°19′32″N 2°59′20″W

Bizkaiko Txakolina-Txakoli de Bizkaia-Chacolí de Bizkaia DOP
- Wine region
- Bizkaiko Txakolina-Txakoli de Bizkaia-Chacolí de Bizkaia DOP in the province of Bizkaia in the region of Basque Country
- Official name: D.O.P. Bizkaiko Txakolina-Txakoli de Bizkaia-Chacolí de Bizkaia
- Type: Denominación de Origen Protegida (DOP)
- Year established: 1994
- Country: Spain
- No. of vineyards: 403 hectares (996 acres)
- No. of wineries: 36
- Wine produced: 18,062 hectolitres
- Comments: Data for 2016 / 2017

Txakoli de Bizkaia – Bizkaiko Txakolina is a Spanish Denominación de Origen Protegida (DOP) (Basque: Jatorri Deitura Babestua) for wines, located in the province of Bizkaia, Basque Country, Spain. The DOP includes vineyards from 82 different municipalities.

Txacolí is a thin white acidic wine that can be naturally fizzy and is traditionally served like cider, poured from a height into the glass.

== History ==
The Txacolí de Bizkaia DOP was created in 1994 and covers around 250 hectares of vineyards. Wine had traditionally been made in this manner for hundreds of years and was popular from the Middle Ages up to the end of the 19th century, when the vines were devastated by the phylloxera virus and the effects of industrialization of the Basque Country. There are now 36 wineries (bodegas) registered with the DOP.

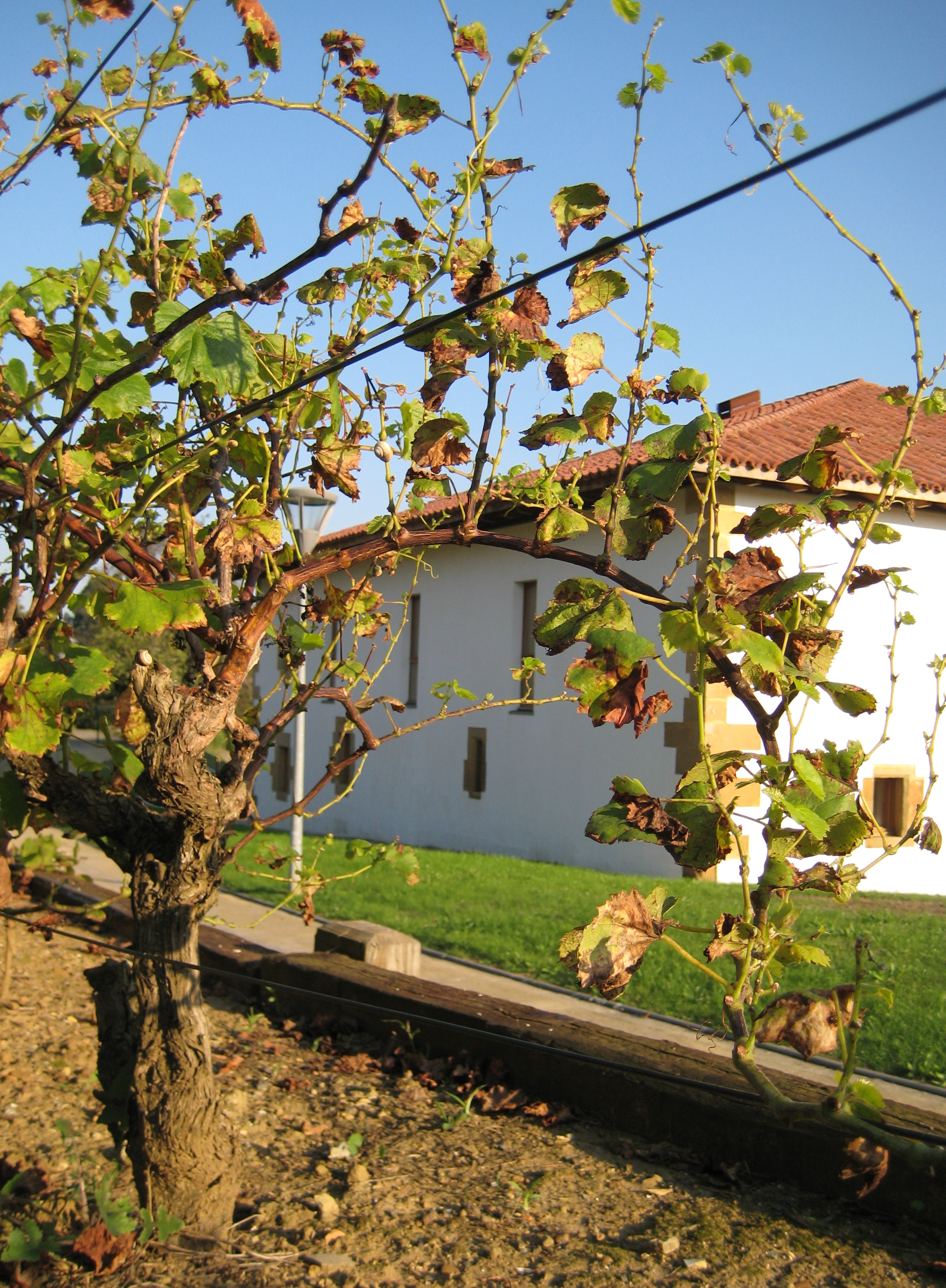
Mendibile Palace, home of the Regulatory Council of the Txacolí de Bizkaia DO

== Authorised grape varieties ==
The authorised grape varieties are:

- Red: Ondarribi Beltza
- White: Hondarrabi Zuri is preferred; also authorised are Hondarrabi Zuri Zerratia / Petit Courbu, Mune Mahatsa / Folle Blanche, Izkiriota / Gros Manseng, Izkiriota Ttippia /Petit Manseng, Sauvignon Blanc, Riesling, and Chardonnay

As in neighbouring Guipuzcoa, the main variety used to make txacolí is the white Hondarrabi Zuri, though there is also some Folle Blanche planted. The red Hondarribi Beltza variety is much less common and is only found in significant quantities in the municipality of Bakio. Near the coast, the vines are trained over pergolas, while inland, around the town of Balmaseda they are on trellises (en espaldera).

== Vineyards ==
The vineyards are planted along the coast and the banks of the estuary, both to the east and to the west of Bilbao, the provincial capital. There are two main traditional areas: Bakio on the coast and Balmaseda inland. Most of the vineyards are small and dispersed on the low foothills near the coast, at an average height of 150 m above sea-level.

The soils near the coast are predominantly clay while further inland it is more varied. In deep soil areas there limestone and marls are present. The shallow soils are neutral or acidic and rich in organic matter.

- There are 240 ha of vineyards registered with the D.O.
- Permitted maximum yield: 70%
- Maximum authorized yield: 13,000 kg/ha
- Permitted alcohol content: 11.5% (white); 12% (red)

== Climate ==
The climate around Bakio is cool, rainy and completely Atlantic, while inland around Balsameda, it is warmer, drier and more continental with micro-climates in each valley.

The average temperature is 12°C and there is an occasional risk of late frosts and hail. It is rainy all year round with an average annual rainfall of 1,000 mm to 1,200 mm.
