= Sanlúcar de Barrameda 2019–2022 =

Events held to celebrate Magellan's circumnavigation

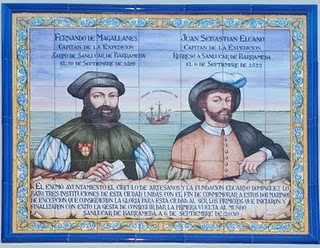
Tile commemorating the first global circumnavigation, the Magellan-Elcano expedition, which sailed from Sanlúcar de Barrameda (Cadiz), Spain, on 20 September 1519.

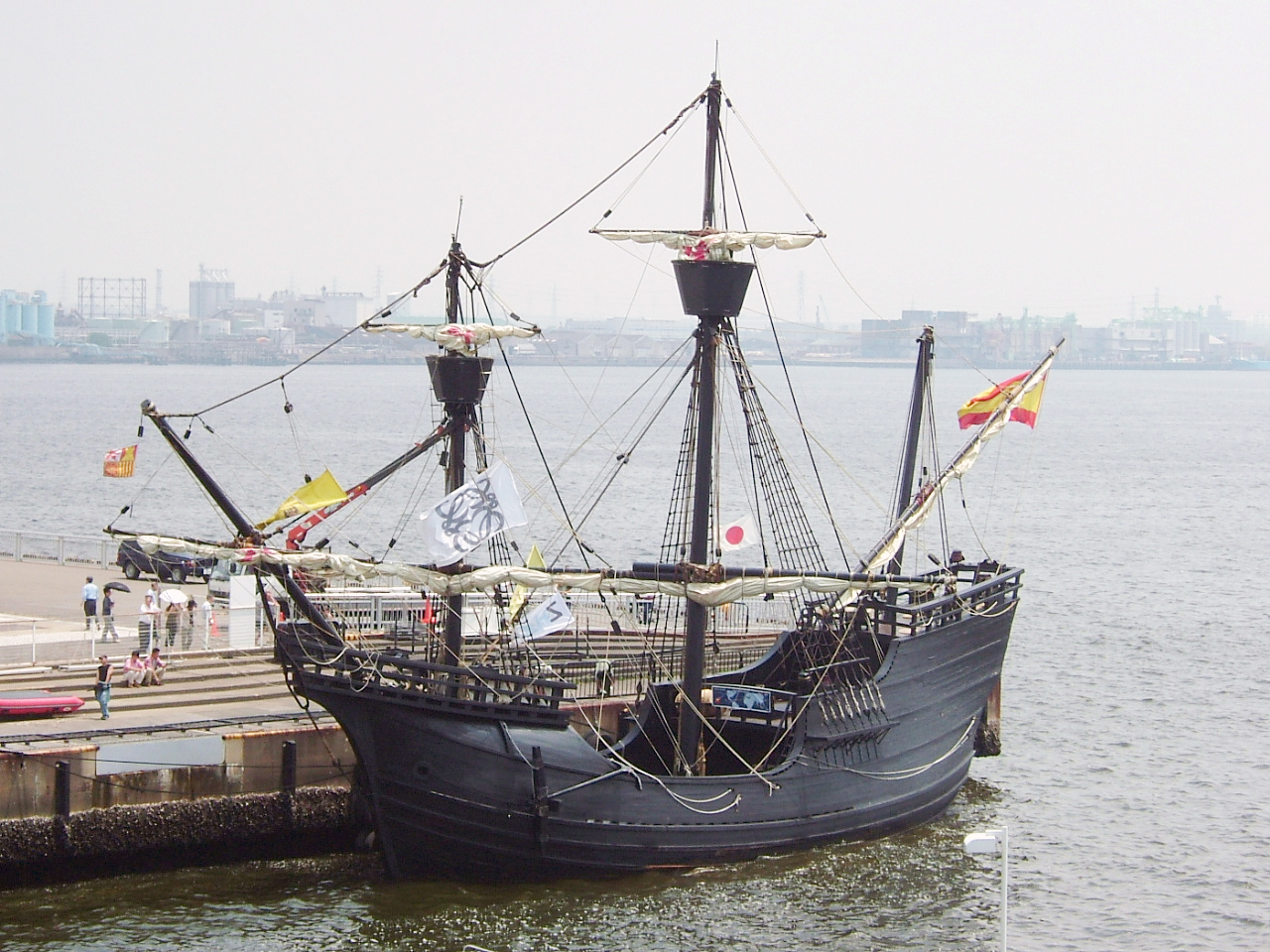
Replica of the Victoria, the only one of the five ships of Ferdinand Magellan which returned to Spain in 1522, becoming the first ship to circumnavigate the globe. Photographed in Nagoya, Japan in June 2005.

Sanlúcar de Barrameda 2019–2022 is a program of events in Spain and Portugal, to be held between 2019 and 2022 in commemoration of the five hundredth anniversary of Ferdinand Magellan's circumnavigation of the Earth. Events will be co-ordinated via an organisation located in Sanlúcar de Barrameda (Cádiz) in Spain.

== Objectives ==
The commemoration of the Magellan-Elcano expedition, five centuries later, aims to:

- Contribute to the junction between different cultures and sciences of every people around the world.
- Facilitate the participation and integration in this commemoration of initiatives from different cities and countries.
- Make known worldwide the city that saw depart and successfully complete the first circumnavigation of the globe, one of the greatest achievements performed by humans.
- Provide Sanlúcar de Barrameda a universal city project, developing actions which serve as a celebration of the historical past of the city, while constituting a legacy for its future.

Map of the first global circumnavigation, starting and finishing in Sanlúcar de Barrameda.

== History ==
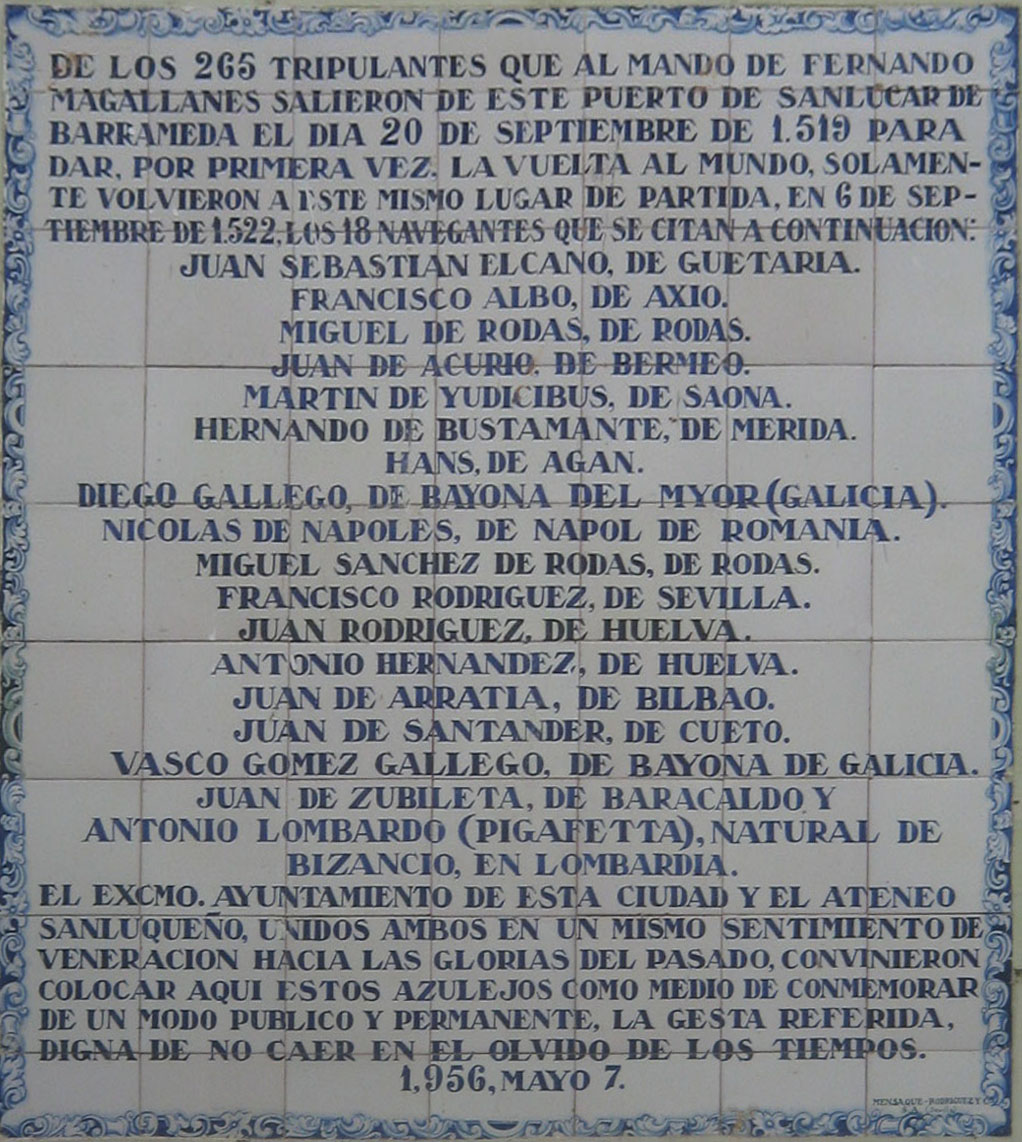
Commemorative plaque of the 1st circumnavigation of the Earth, Sanlúcar de Barrameda (Cádiz), Spain

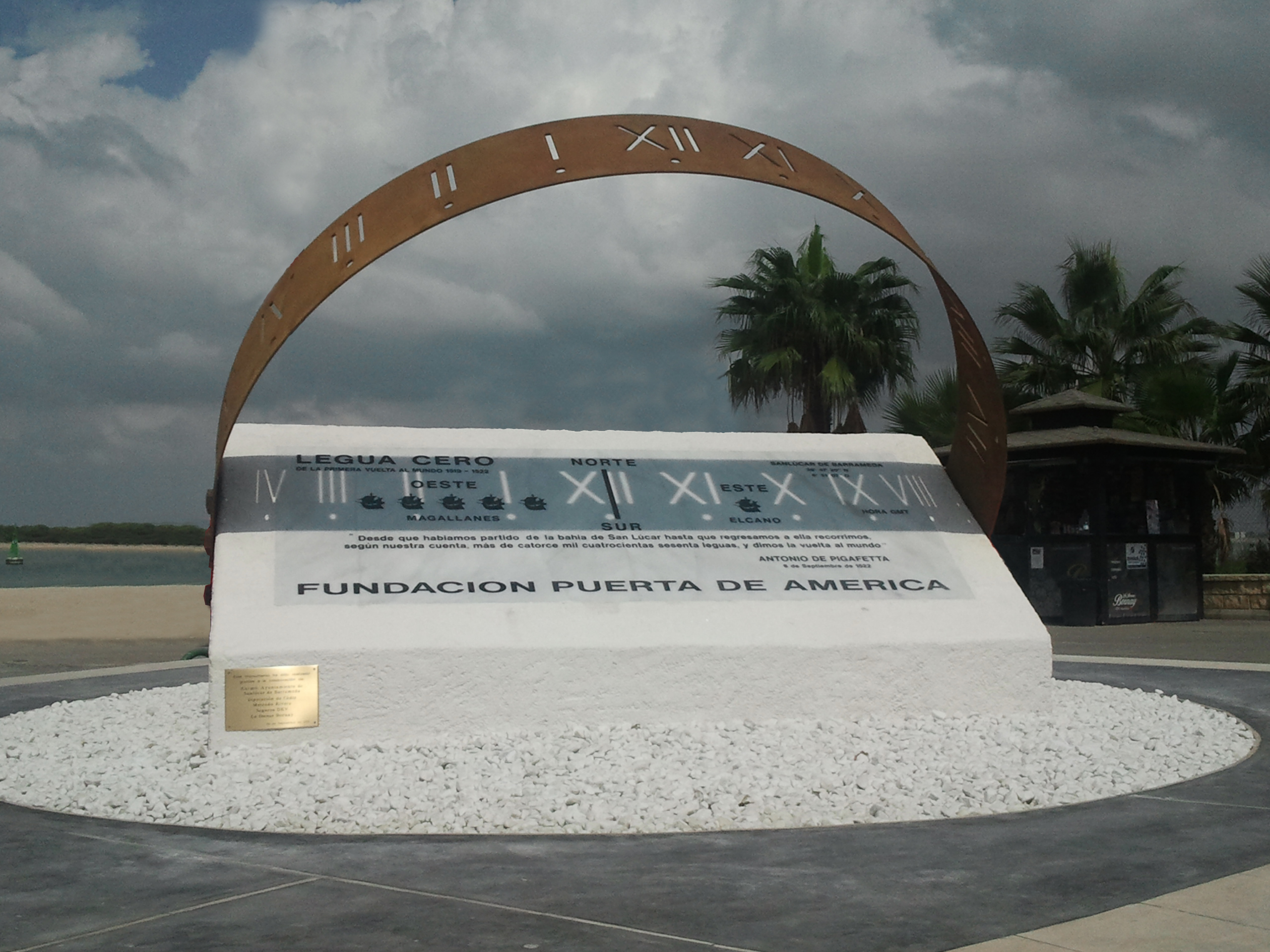
"Legua Cero" monument commemorating the first world circumnavegation. Sanlúcar de Barrameda, Cádiz, España.

Although the idea of this initiative comes from Sanlúcar de Barrameda in 2003, is rooted a century earlier, in 1913, when Genaro Cavestany, land register, promoted and called for this city the celebration of the fourth centenary of that first circumnavigation, as it was the starting point and return of that expedition.

At the time, that celebration did not take place in Sanlúcar de Barrameda, but in other Spanish cities. Since 2003, a group of people from Sanlúcar have been working on getting this time which was not possible then, and now, with more preparation and support, that will be possible. There are a large number of historical studies which prove that the expedition left and ended in Sanlúcar de Barrameda. It was the departure and arrival port of the voyages of exploration, discovery and colonization the Spanish had made by sea since the discovery of the Americas and therefore it was called "the door of America".

In September 2004 this group started working in the draft of this V centenary celebration, presented it to the City Hall and began to draw up a roadmap. In June 2007, with the support from the City Hall and the Círculo de Artesanos the project Sanlúcar 2019–2022 is presented. Between 2008 and 2010 the first acts to claim this event are held.

In 2010, Fundaciónn Eduardo Domínguez Lobato and Círculo de Artesanos, in collaboration with the City Council and the promoters of the idea, grant the first Circumnavigation to Culture and History Awards, being first winners the cities of Sabrosa (birthplace of Ferdinand Magellan in Portugal), Getaria (birthplace of Juan Sebastián Elcano) and Sanlúcar de Barrameda itself (start and end of the expedition trip). Prizes will be awarded on an annual basis to countries, cities and people who had such a significant relationship with that epic.

== Organization and acts ==
Some of the acts already performed or planned to develop this initiative are:

- Cultural Weeks on the Circumnavigation, held since 2008.
- Conferences, concerts and exhibitions.
- Presentation of the logo for this 5th centenary of the first Earth circumnavigation.
- Signing of the cooperation on agreement between the municipalities of Sabrosa, Getaria and Sanlúcar de Barrameda for a common celebration of this event.
- First Circumnavigation Award Ceremony Ferdinand Magellan and Juan Sebastian Elcano to Culture and History, awarded the cities of Sabrosa, Guetaria and Sanlúcar de Barrameda.
- Development of the Charter of Sanlúcar 2019–2022.

These events are organized by the municipality of Sanlúcar de Barrameda and various civil institutions such as the Gate of America Foundation (Fundación Puerta de América), Circulo de Artesanos and Eduardo Dominguez Lobato Foundation.
