= San Anton (Getaria) =

Mountain in Spain

Coordinates: 43°18′32″N 2°12′05″W

San Anton (known also as Getaria's mouse because of its form), is the mountain and half-island located off the coast of Getaria, Gipuzkoa, Spain. San Anton is attached to the mainland by a breakwater. It has an abrupt slope, and is one of the most popular places of Basque Country. It is used principally for recreation by the local population. The mountain has a natural park. The top of the mountainside is flatter, and it is decorated by trees. Its precipice is formed with rocks, specially with one called Armeria euskadiensis.

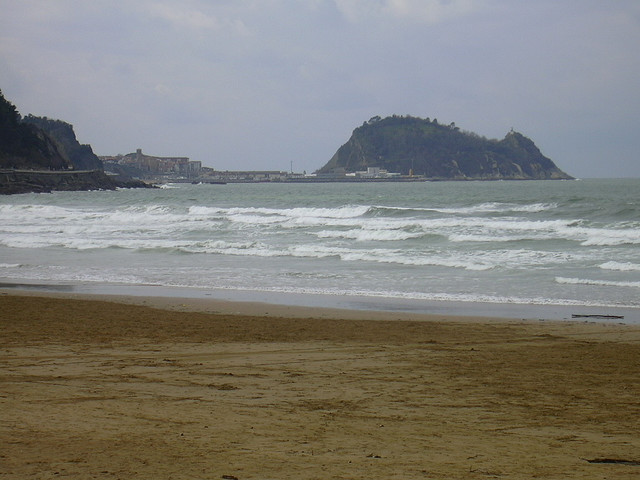
San Anton mountain

San Anton mountain takes its name from an ancient hermitage, which was located near the actual lighthouse before it was destroyed by the French in the first half of 19th century. It was a privileged vantage point to see whales, whose capture was one of the jobs of people from this town.

This island was intentionally attached to the port in the 15th century. The breakwater was given the name of "The Passage" in order to complete the construction of a small harbor for the mountain-island, replacing the old rocky ridge that had been destroyed by a storm. Fortifications, an 1863 lighthouse and farmhouses like Abeta, Agoteaundi, and Gure ametsa decorate San Anton.
