= Artziniega =

Municipality of Spain

- Municipality
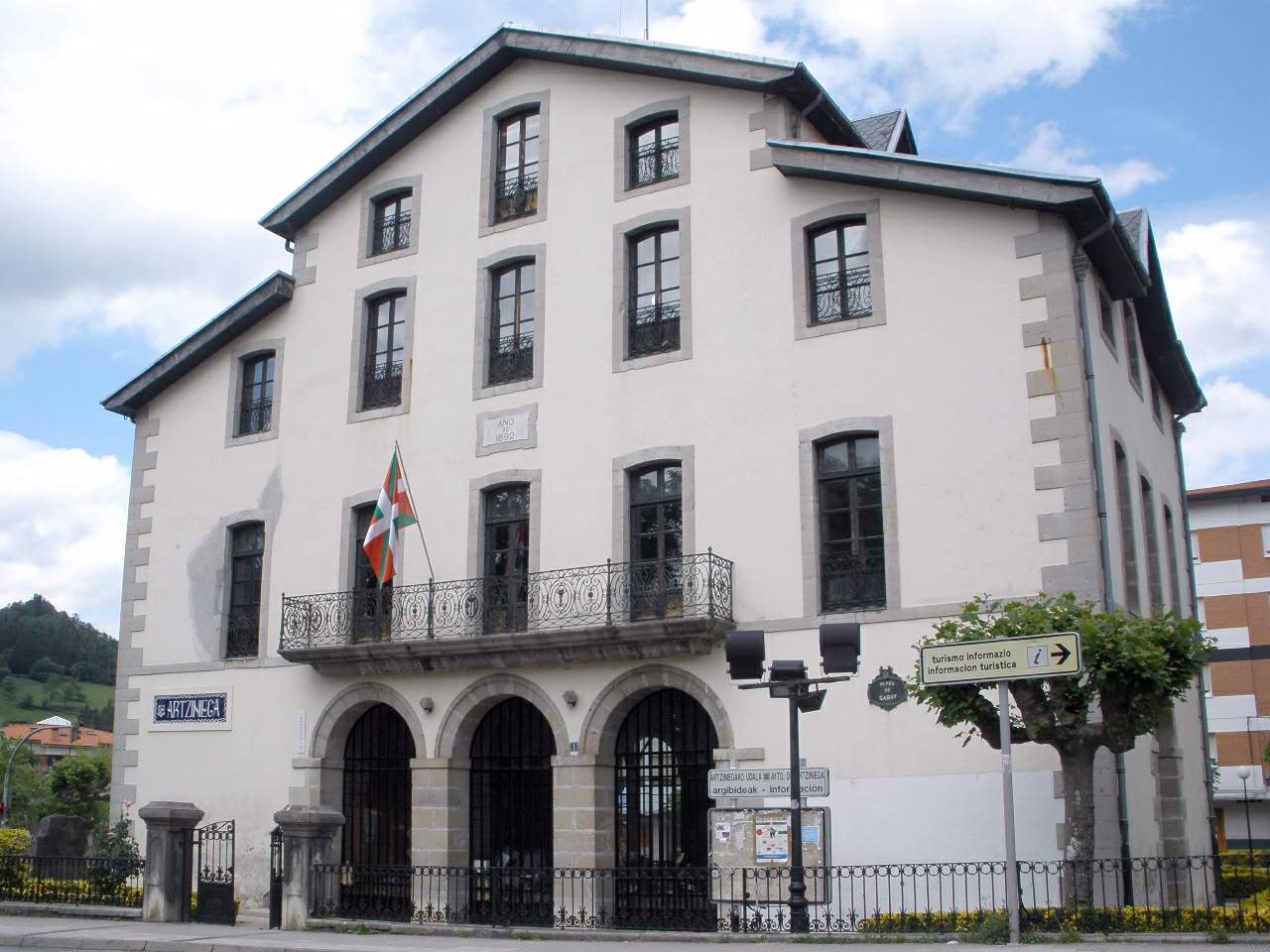
- Town hall of Artziniega

- Coat of arms

- Location of Artziniega within the Basque Country Location of Artziniega within Spain
- Coordinates: 43°07′N 3°08′W
- Country: Spain
- Autonomous Community: Basque Country
- Province: Álava
- Comarca: Cuadrilla de Ayala

Government
  - Mayor: Agurtxane Llano Cuadrado

Area
  - Total: 27.45 km^{2} (10.60 sq mi)
- Elevation (AMSL): 210 m (690 ft)

Population (2025-01-01)
  - Total: 1,868
  - Density: 68.05/km^{2} (176.3/sq mi)
- Time zone: UTC+1 (CET)
  - Summer (DST): UTC+2 (CEST (GMT +2))
- Postal code: 01474

Artziniega (Spanish: Arceniega) is a town and municipality in the province of Álava, in the Basque Country, northern Spain. Located in the northwest of Araba, on the border with Burgos, Castile and León and Biscay, it was at the junction between the old Kingdom of Castile and the ports of the Bay of Biscay.

The town probably derives its name from the Basque "Artzain-aga," meaning "place of shepherds."

== Geography ==
The municipality of Artziniega is located in an environment of significant environmental value, in a mountainous Cantabrian area close to the plateau formed by Gorobel and Sierra de Carbonilla, (also called Sierra de Angulo). These mountains mark the abrupt limit of the Castilian plateau with the Atlantic slope and contain dense forests, cliffs, rocks and mountain meadows.

Within the municipality of Artziniega in the surroundings of the Villa there are large areas of grassland dotted with some orchards. In the past, the areas cultivated with wheat, barley or vine were much more extensive, as a result of supply needs, but today most of these lands are pastures, and many of them have been urbanized in recent years.

In the mountainous areas there is an important forest mass of leafy characteristics of the Atlantic gall oaks, made up of oaks, holm oaks, maples, ash trees and other types of native trees.

On Mount Ganzorrotz, the presence of numerous yews stands out, becoming so numerous at some points that they form yew trees.

On Mount Otsati, the largest lorera in the Basque Country was discovered in 2016, straddling Álava and Burgos.

At the entrance to the Sanctuary of Our Lady of the Oak and in the vicinity of a recreational area, you can see an oak that is more than 500 years old and classified as a singular tree of the Basque Country.

The repopulated pine forests occupy large areas. On the slopes of Mount Pando, between the limits with Gordexola, Valle de Mena and Mendieta, you can see repopulations of distinguished pine. On the other hand, in Mount Peñalba, the lariceo pine has been used on its southern slope and the maritime pine in the northeast, more adapted to the soil and climate conditions of that area.

Fauna abounds in all these areas (wild boars, roe deer, raptors, hares, genets).

== History ==
=== Prehistory and Middle Ages ===
The area of Artziniega was populated since prehistoric times. In the Church Cave, in Retes de Tudela, prehistoric human remains have been found, and not far from there, in the Gordeliz neighborhood, a headstone with an inscription in Latin was found in the 18th century, possibly dedicated to a local marine deity, which attests to the Roman presence in these lands.

Likewise, in the excavations carried out in the Sanctuary of Our Lady of the Oak, remains of a settlement with Roman culture dated between the 4th and 6th centuries have been found. In the garden of the same sanctuary, which already dates from the Romanesque, a stele dating from the 9th century remained until the mid-nineties.

The written history of Artziniega begins in the year 1272, when the King of Castile, Alfonso X El Sabio, granted Artziniega the letter-town. This foundation most likely obeys the desire of the King of Castile to found a town halfway between Urduña and Balmaseda that would allow it to rival these towns, belonging to the lords of Biscay. However, after a short time, due to family circumstances, the kings of Castile themselves would become lords of Biscay, so Artziniega did not fulfill his strategic function and remained as a second-order town in terms of commercial importance. Once founded (probably on a previous human settlement), the Villa would henceforth be governed by the jurisdiction of Biscay, the native of the land, and for economic and tax matters by the jurisdiction of Vitoria-Gasteiz.

Until Don Tello's death, it belonged to Biscay, but upon his death, in 1370, he handed it over to his brother, King Enrique II, who a year later handed it over to Pedro López de Ayala, the Chancellor, along with the valleys of Orozko and Laudio. It was at the time when Don Tello controlled the town when it was besieged by Pedro Fernández de Velasco, specifically in 1366.

After that, and until 1817, the lords and dukes of Ayala (and later the dukes of Veragua, Berwick and Liria) had the prerogative of appointing mayors in Artziniega, but they never exercised it, since although it was formally part of the lordship of Ayala, in practice never did. While it belonged to Biscay, the Lord appointed the mayors, and later the town did so in an open council.

=== Modern Age ===
During the Middle Ages, like the rest of the country, Artziniega lived marked by the Wars of the Bands between rival clans that fought for control of the territory. Artziniega was located in a strategic place of commercial interchange between the Kingdom of Castile and the ports of the Bay of Biscay, which meant that there were some lineages of a certain wealth (for example, the Bengoa, Ortiz de Molinillo-Velasco, and Monteano), but in reality the local activities were primarily agrarian in nature. In agriculture and livestock husbandry, Artziniega was not prominent. However, it was a first-rate Txakoli-producing town. As for the Wars of the Bands, the Villa was surrounded by violence, including an attempted siege. An example of the impact of this violent period, is the request made by the Artziniega ironworks to the Monarchs in 1491, as a result of the abuses they had suffered at the hands of Largacha of Iratzagorría, whose family's interest in the iron trade had long been great.

In the 15th century, the town was endowed with ordinances that give testimony of daily life and the then-current economic activities: cultivation of wheat, grapevines, livestock, and the work of the mills, and urban trades such as weavers, waiters, and bakers. The weekly market had great importance even then, since Artziniega has been during its history the economic center of the region. Its annual September fairs were events that lasted fifteen days, at this period of the town's existence.

At this time, during the Middle Ages, an important supra-municipal institution for Artziniega, the Junta de Ordunte, was constituted, which grouped the Villa and the neighboring Ayalese towns (Mendieta, Retes de Tudela, Santa Coloma and Soxoguti), to settle common matters, such as the use of the mountains and pastures.

After the first years of transition from the Middle Ages to the Renaissance, Artziniega experienced a period of expansion in which space outside the walls began to be occupied and the wealth generated by discovery directly resulted in the development of the Villa.

There are many Artziniegans who made their fortune in the Americas at this period. For example, in 1590, the bachelor Pedro Sáenz de Ubaldi founded a hospital in front of the parish. It was later transferred to the canton of Zubiaur, and later again to the Arenaza neighborhood, where it remained until the middle of the 20th century. A similar occurrence was the foundation of the first Artziniega schools through a donation from Pedro de Oribe Salazar in 1608.

At this time, unaccustomed historical events took place in Artziniega, such as the disputes with some young people from Artziniega who refused to do military service, or the rejection that the attorney for Artziniega suffered at the General Councils of Álava in 1674 because he did not know Spanish, and spoke only Euskara, the Basque language.

=== Contemporary age ===
During the last Carlist war, Artziniega suffered fighting and the archives and Civil Registry of the Villa were burned, losing important documents. In the Spanish Civil War, Artziniega was also involved in the conflict and witnessed the advance of the fascist troops for their lands during 1937. At first, Artziniega was outside the national zone (unlike most of the province of Álava), but the advance of the fascist towards Bilbao made it fall. With the entry of the rebellious troops, the mayor of Artziniega, Juan Zabalgoitia, of the PNV, was imprisoned, sentenced to jail and transferred to the El Puerto de Santa María prison.

In the last years of the dictatorship, the urbanization of land near the Villa took place in Artziniega, and the new neighborhoods of Eguzkimendi, Arenaza or El Palacio emerged. This urban growth has accelerated enormously in recent years, which has led to a very large population increase, placing the municipality at approximately 1,700 inhabitants, although there is a very large floating population.

== Cultural heritage ==
=== Historic Quarter ===
The historical-monumental complex of the medieval town of Artziniega is one of the best preserved in the Basque Country. It maintains its original structure located on a hill and composed of three parallel streets linked by two cantons. The almost perfect conservation of this structure is due to the fact that the town did not reach the importance with which it was conceived. The intramural space was gradually occupied, starting with the upper part and the area attached to the Parish of Our Lady of the Assumption (which served as the backbone area) and extending towards Artekale (middle street). The lower part of the town was largely unoccupied in the first centuries, which allowed that from the 18th century onwards, palaces and large houses were built there occupying larger plots. In general, the oldest farmhouse is located in the upper part and dates from the 16th century, despite the fact that most of them have undergone subsequent reforms.

As for the walls that surrounded the town, because in reality they were not too necessary, already by the seventeenth century it seems that they lacked entity, and only specific areas were preserved, such as the gates, which do not exist today, and of which it is believed that there were two, one in what is known as "Hiriko Atea" (city gate), and another in the extreme west, giving to the area of public use called "Beheko Zelaia". Of the wall itself, there are only visible remains in the lower part of some houses in the lower part of the historic center, and in the upper part, in the walk that includes the town behind the Parish, the latter being the most visible area from the chemin de ronde.

=== Monuments ===
In Artziniega there are different types of monuments, depending on the age of they were built. Monuments within the Historic Quarter include:

- Parish of Our Lady of the Assumption
- Convent of the Augustinian Nuns
- Ortiz de Molinillo and Velasco's Tower
- Bengoa's Tower

== Gallery ==
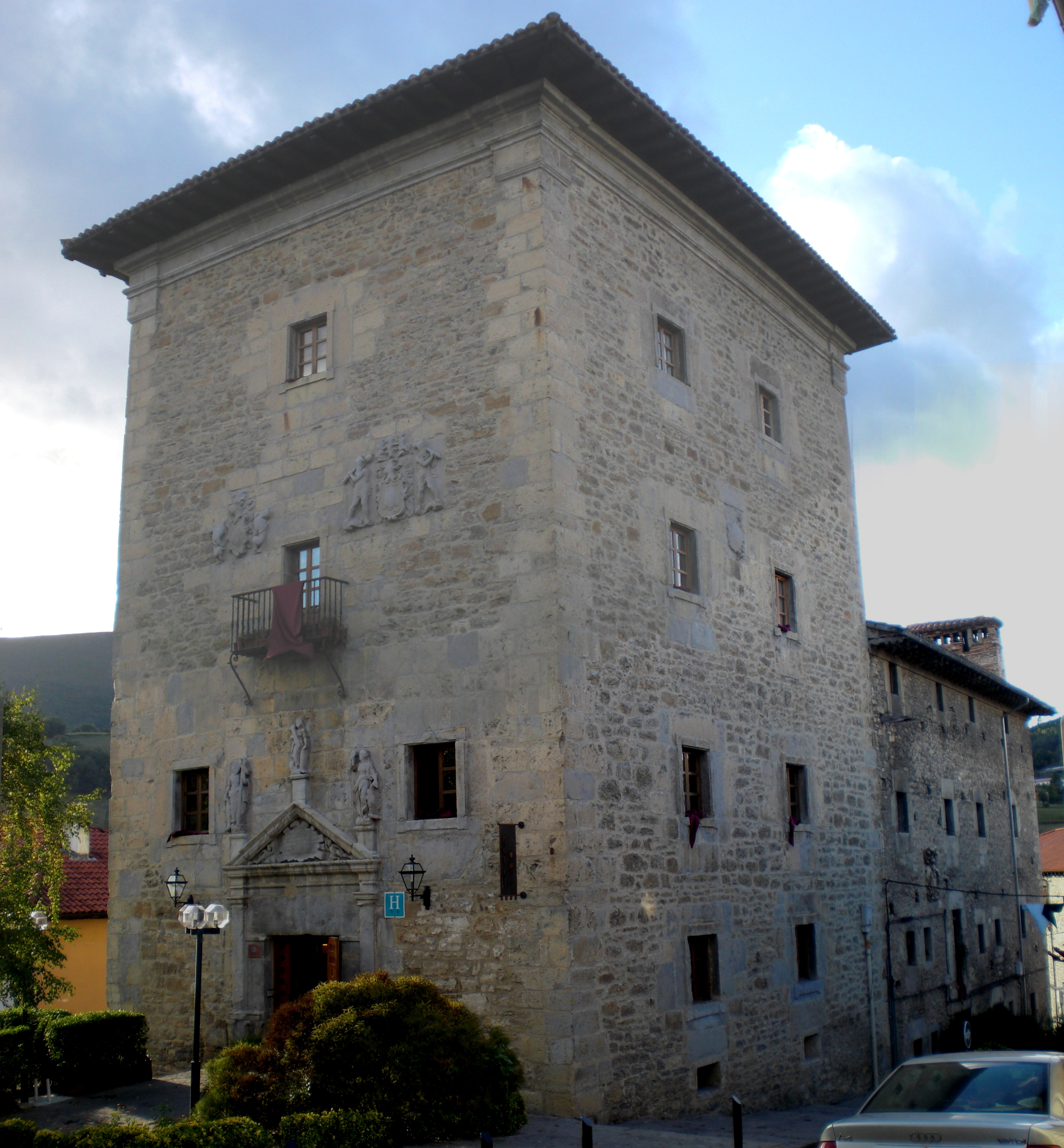
Ortiz de Molinillo and Velasco's Tower.

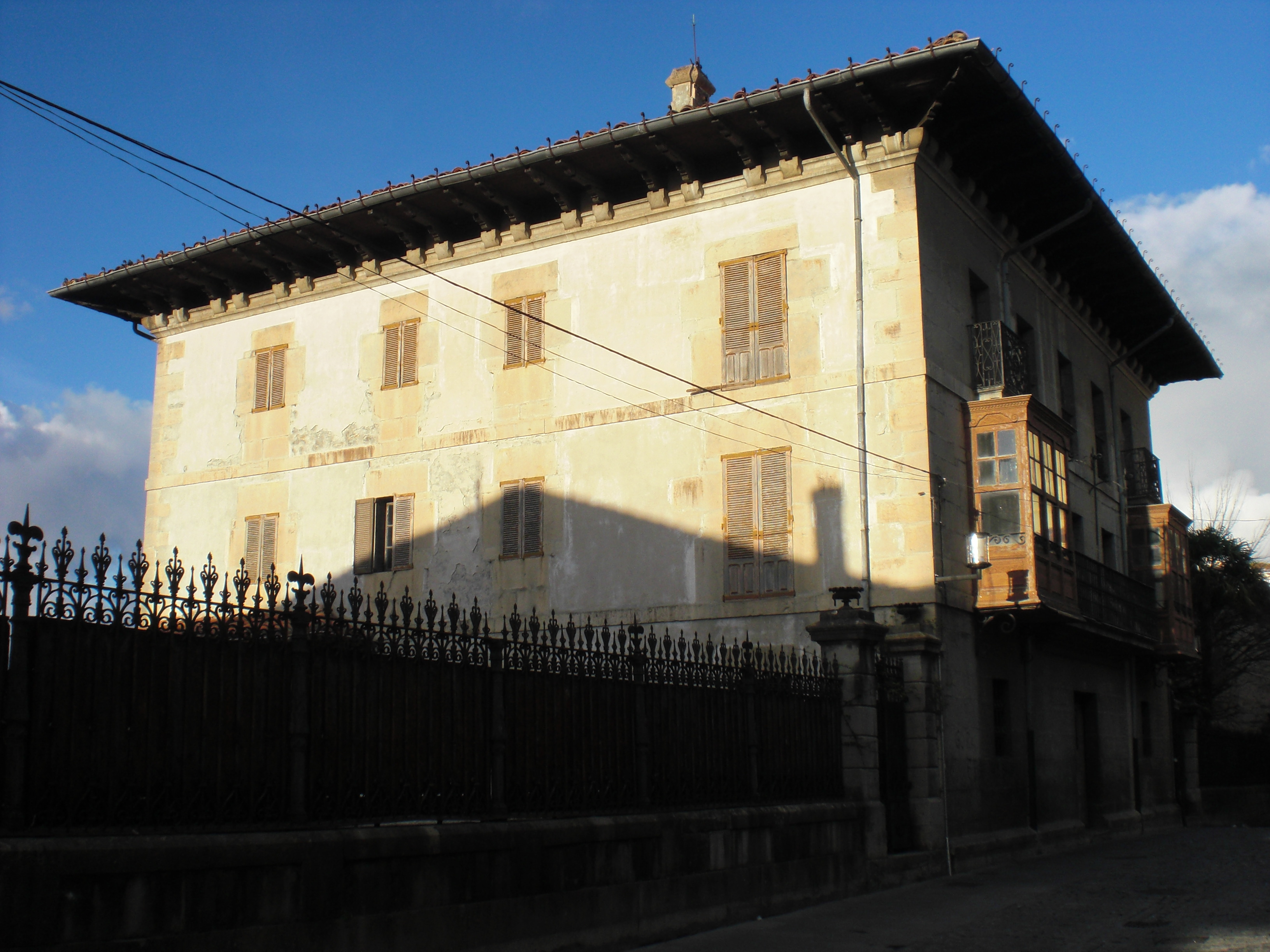
Mora's family large house.

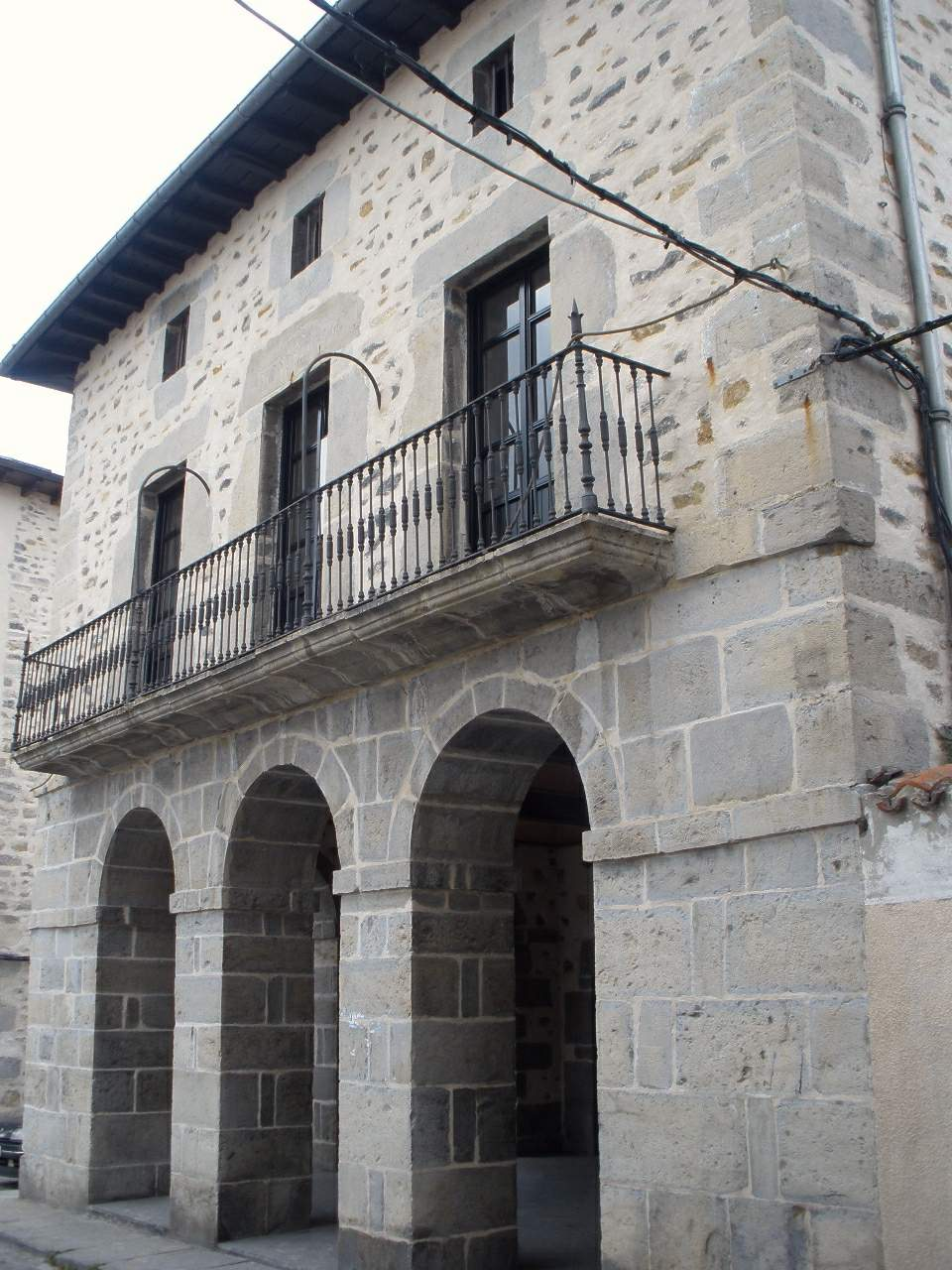
Old Town Hall

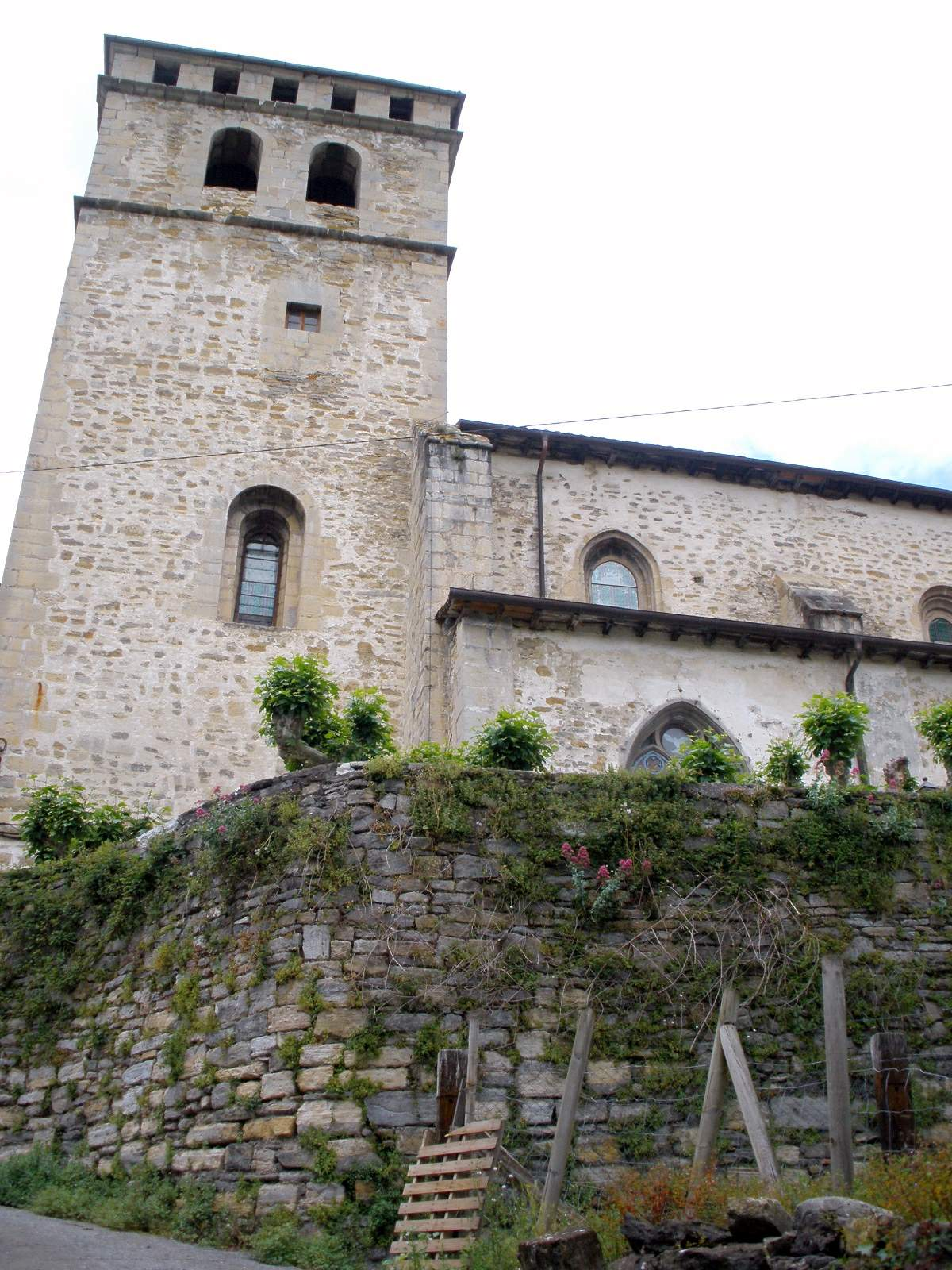
Parish of Our Lady of the Assumption.

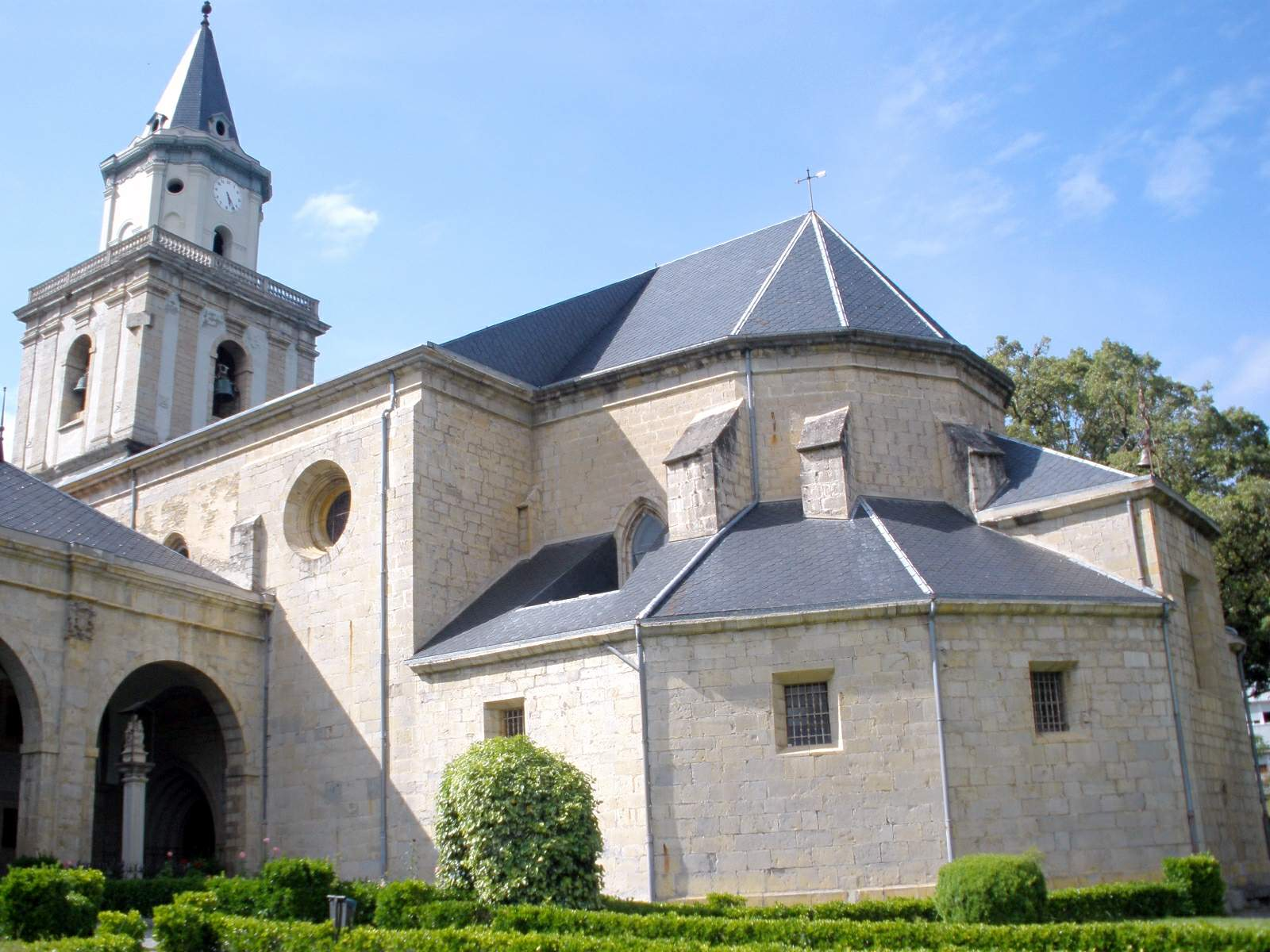
Sanctuary of Our Lady of the Oak,

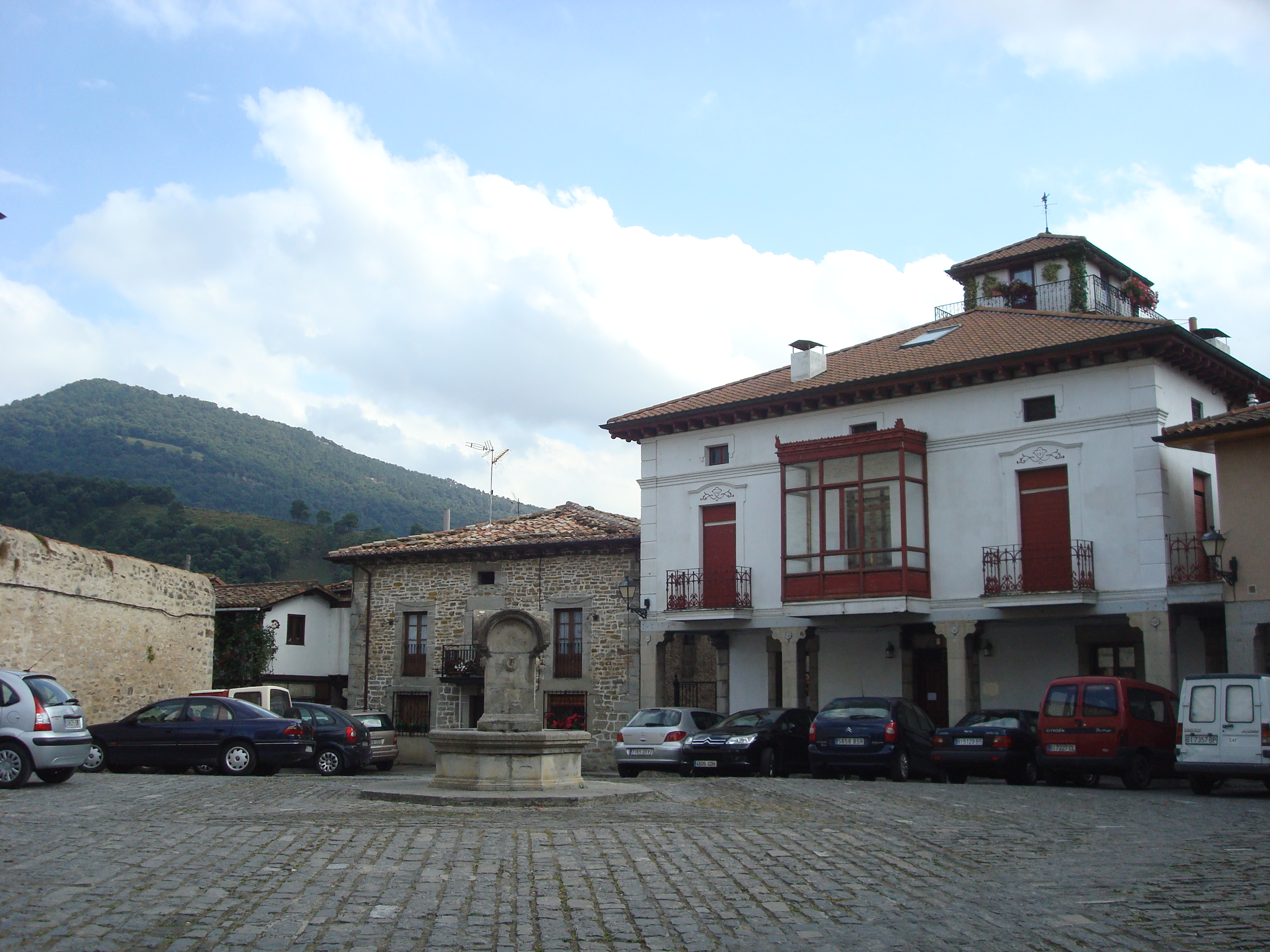
Goiko Plaza

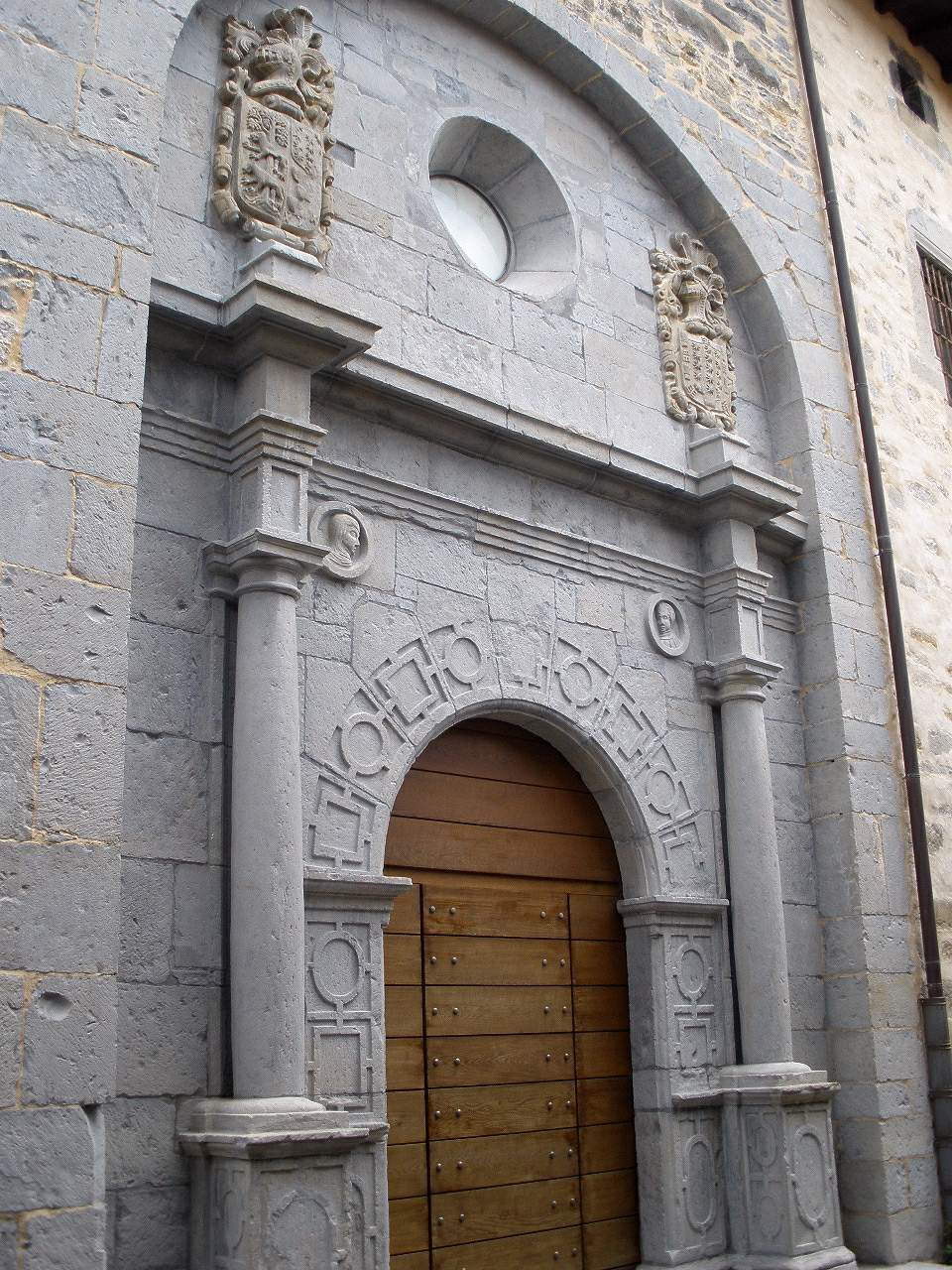
Convent of the Augustinian Nuns.

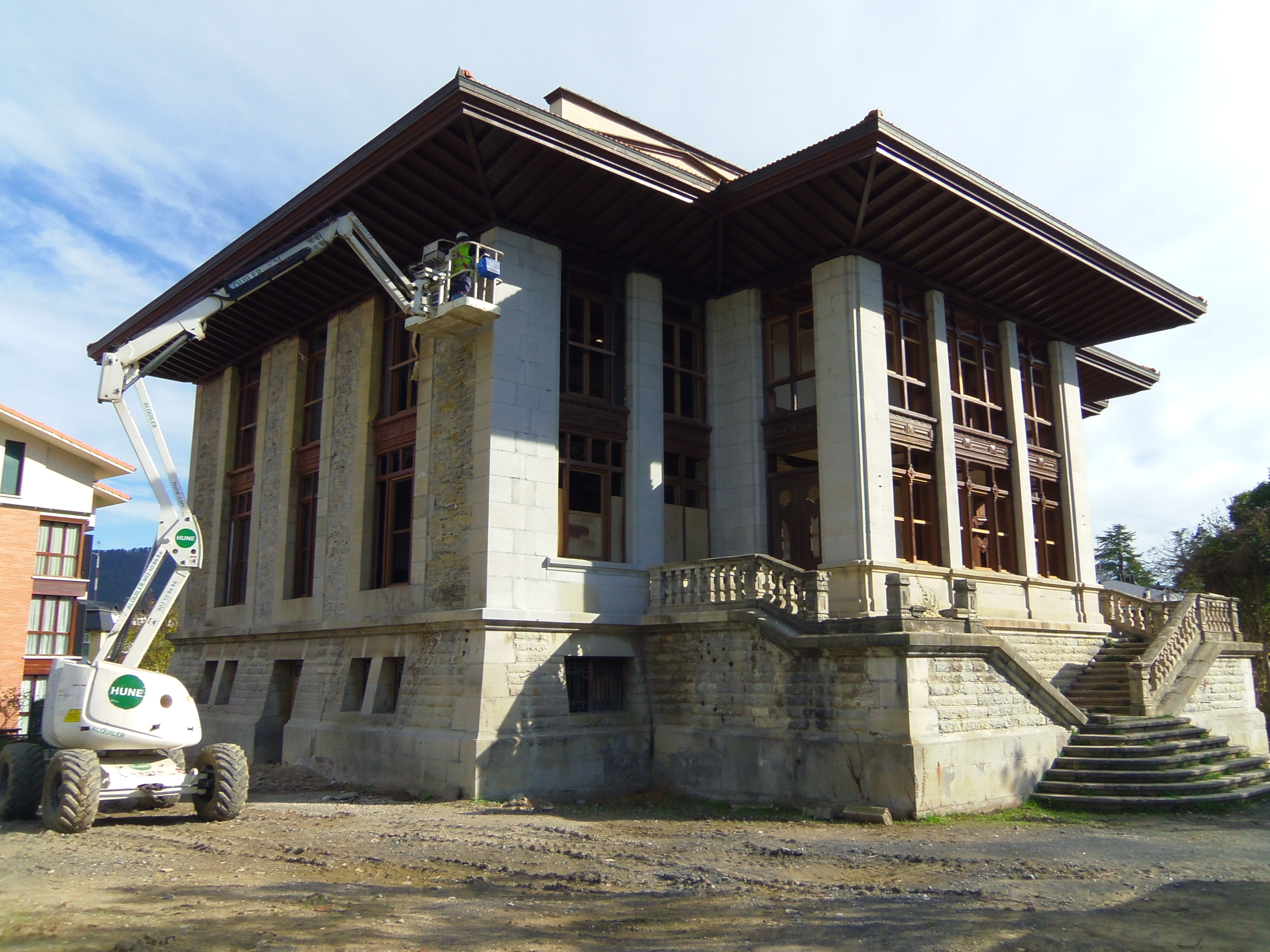
Zabalgoitia Palace.

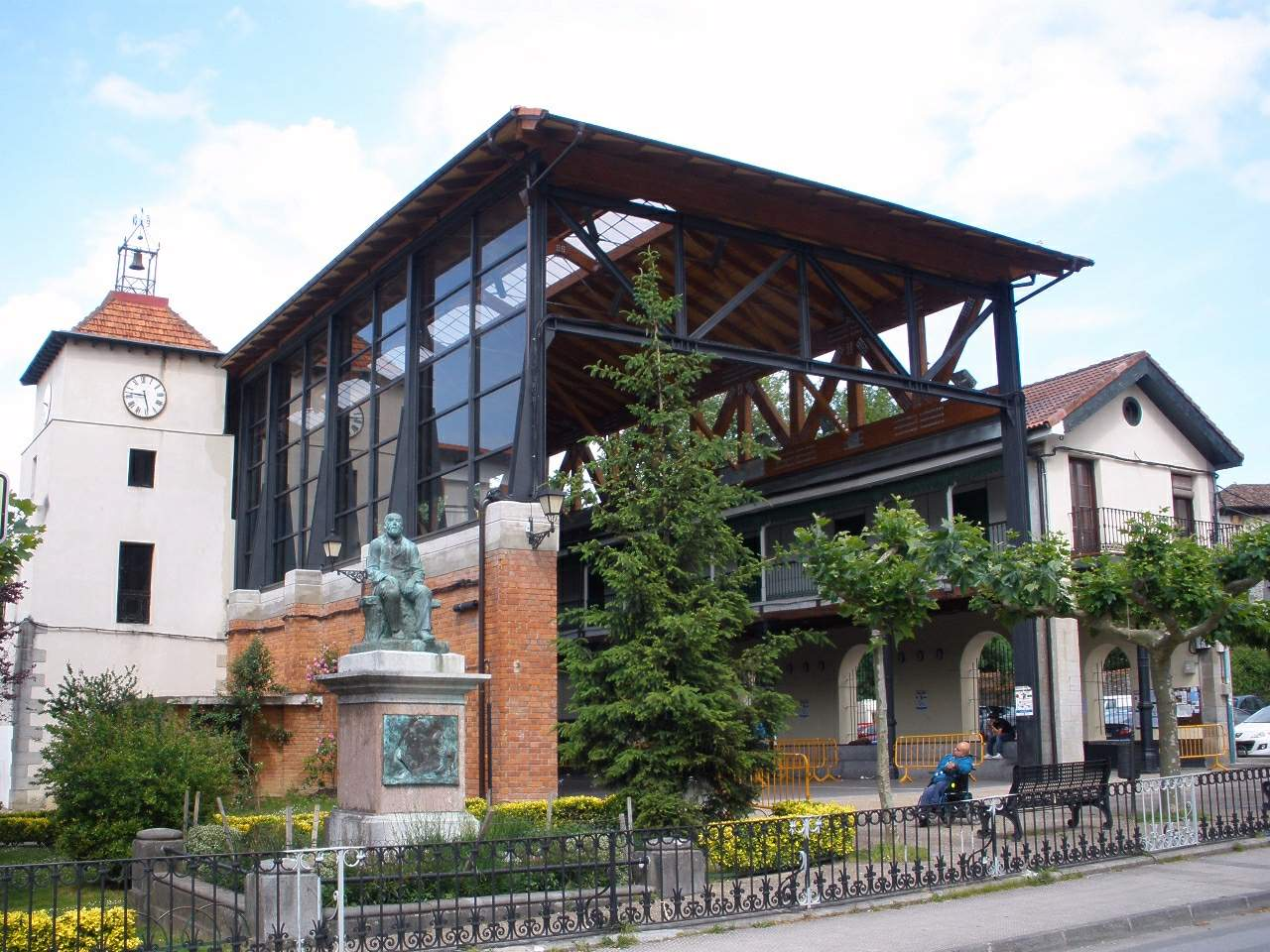
Artziniega's Fronton

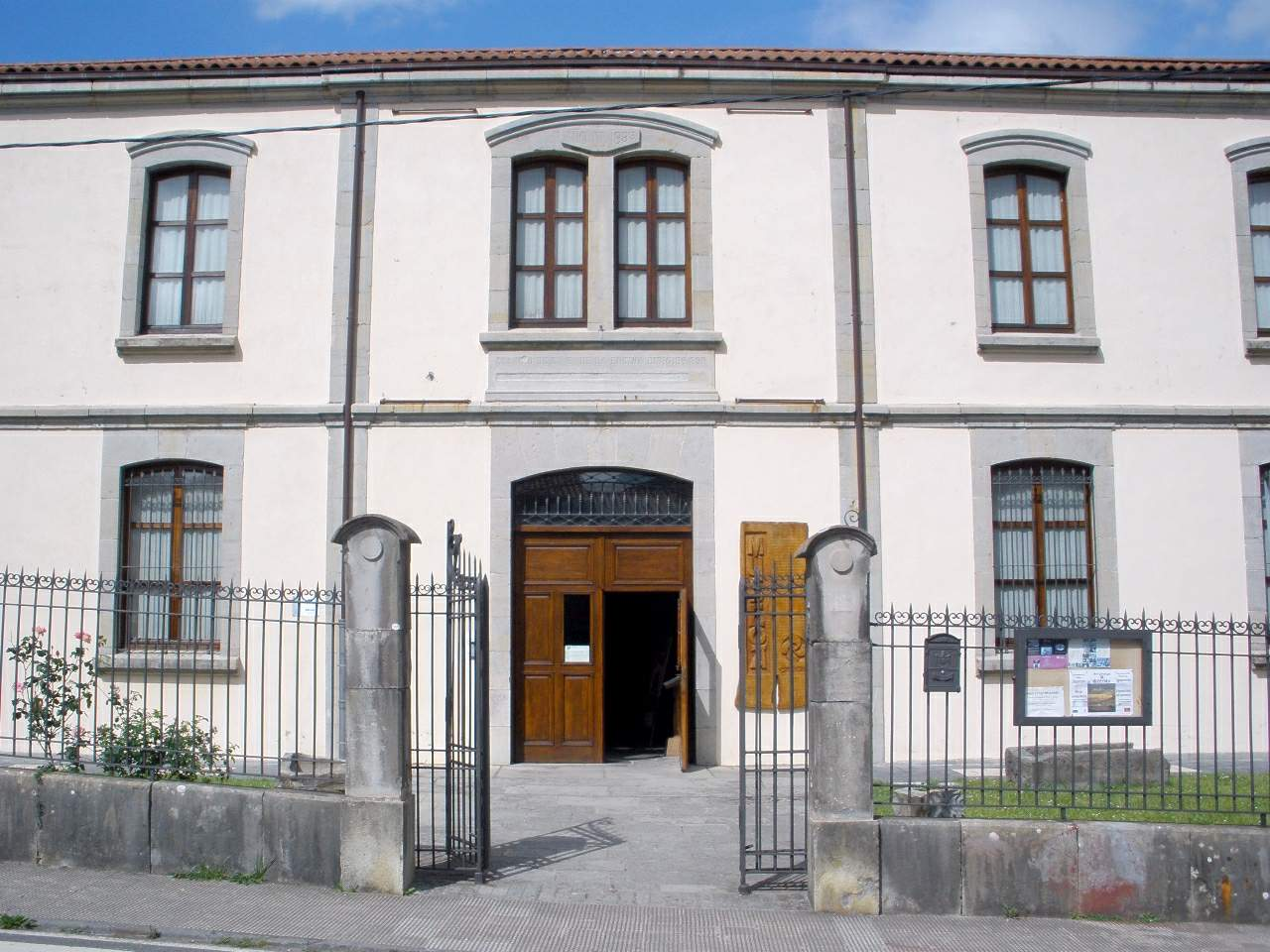
Ethnographic Museum
