= Okondo =

- Municipality
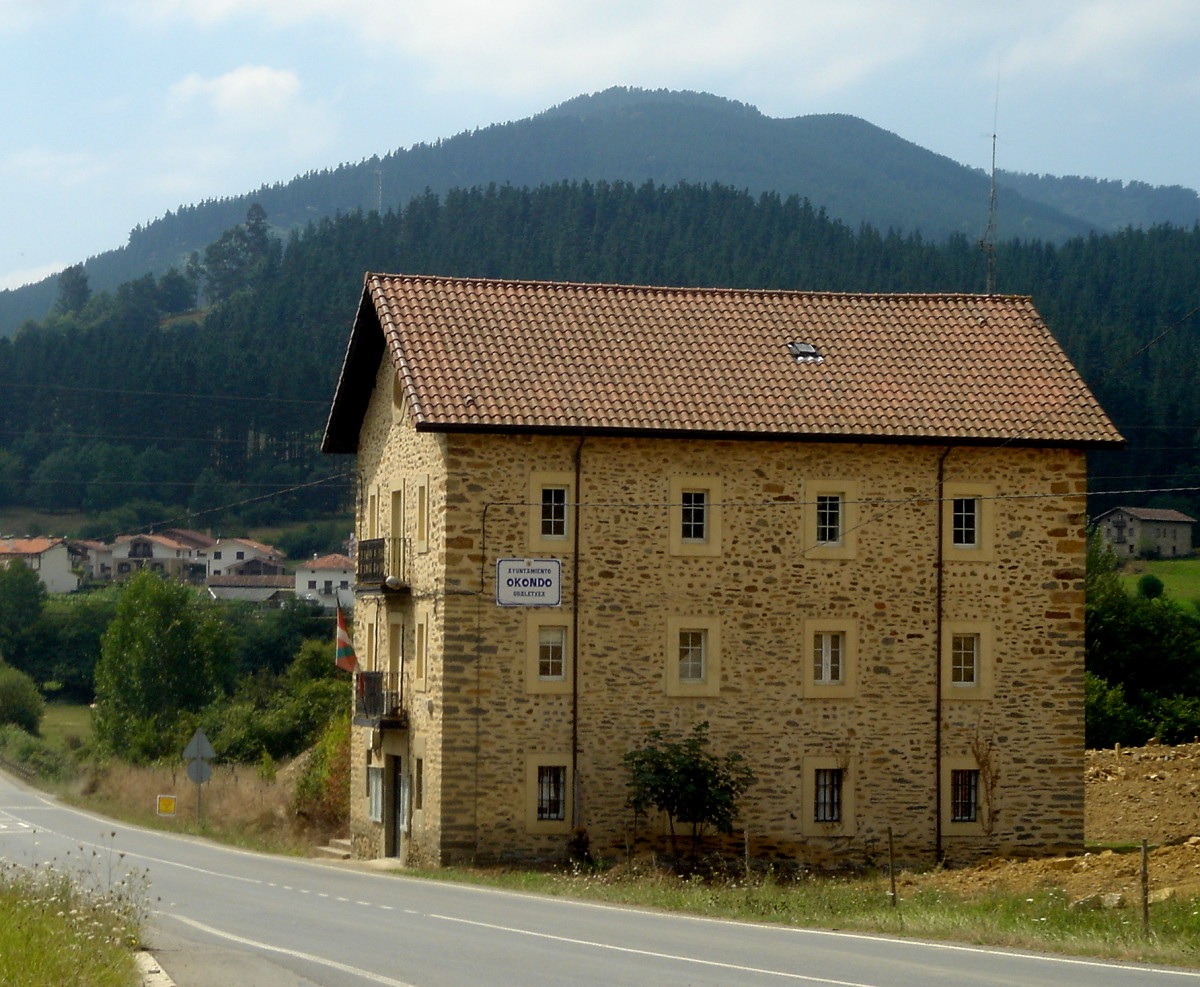

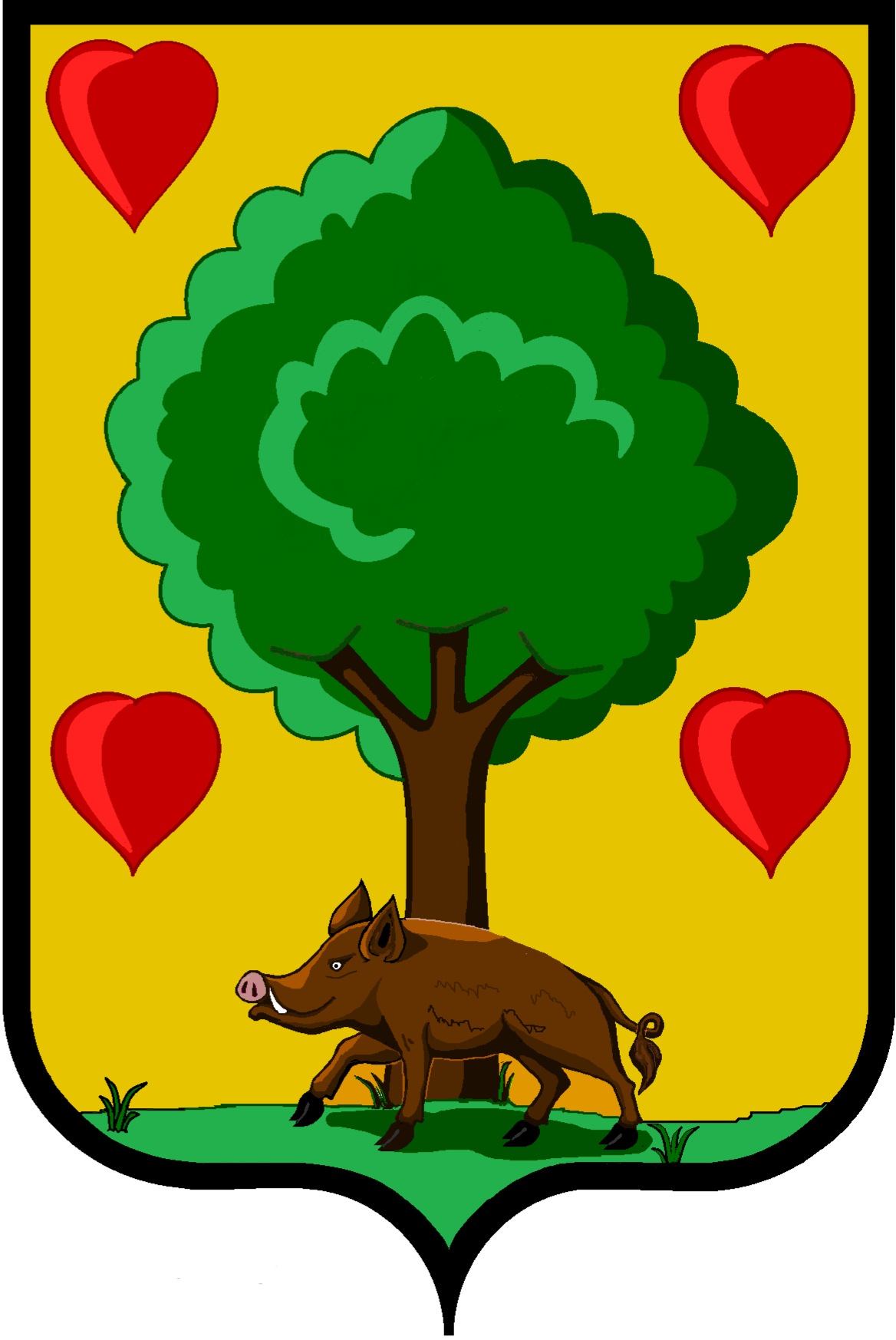
- Coat of arms

- Location of Okondo within the Basque Country Location of Okondo within Spain
- Coordinates: 43°9′44″N 3°1′8″W
- Country: Spain
- Autonomous Community: Basque Country
- Province: Álava
- Comarca: Cuadrilla de Ayala

Government
  - Mayor: Sergio Tato Eguren

Area
  - Total: 30 km^{2} (12 sq mi)
- Elevation (AMSL): 130 m (430 ft)

Population (2025-01-01)
  - Total: 1,184
  - Density: 39/km^{2} (100/sq mi)
- Time zone: UTC+1 (CET)
  - Summer (DST): UTC+2 (CEST (GMT +2))
- Postal code: 01409

Okondo (Spanish: Oquendo) is a town and municipality located in the province of Álava, in the Basque Country, northern Spain.
