= Txakoli =

White wine

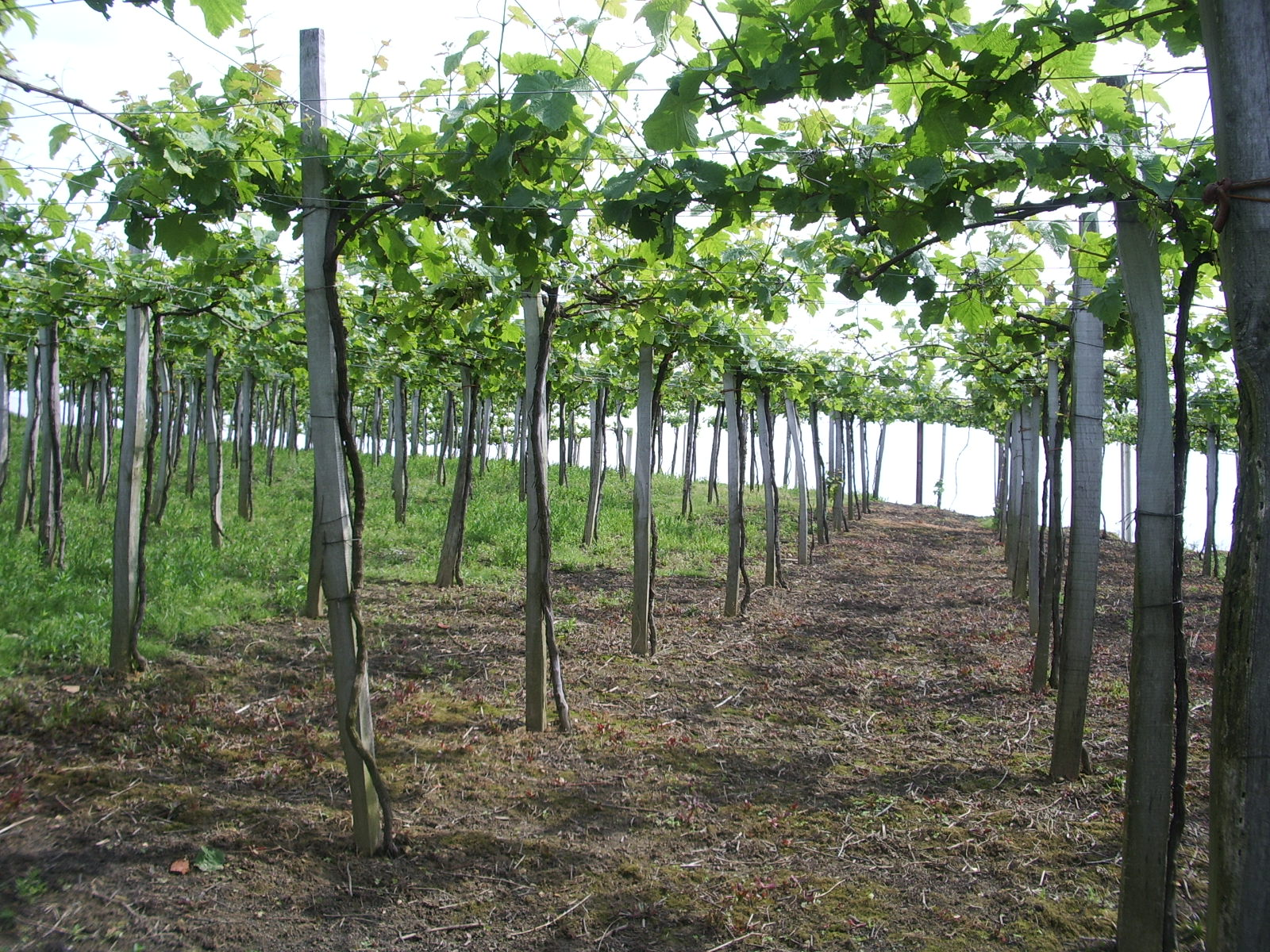
Txakoli vines in the Getaria region

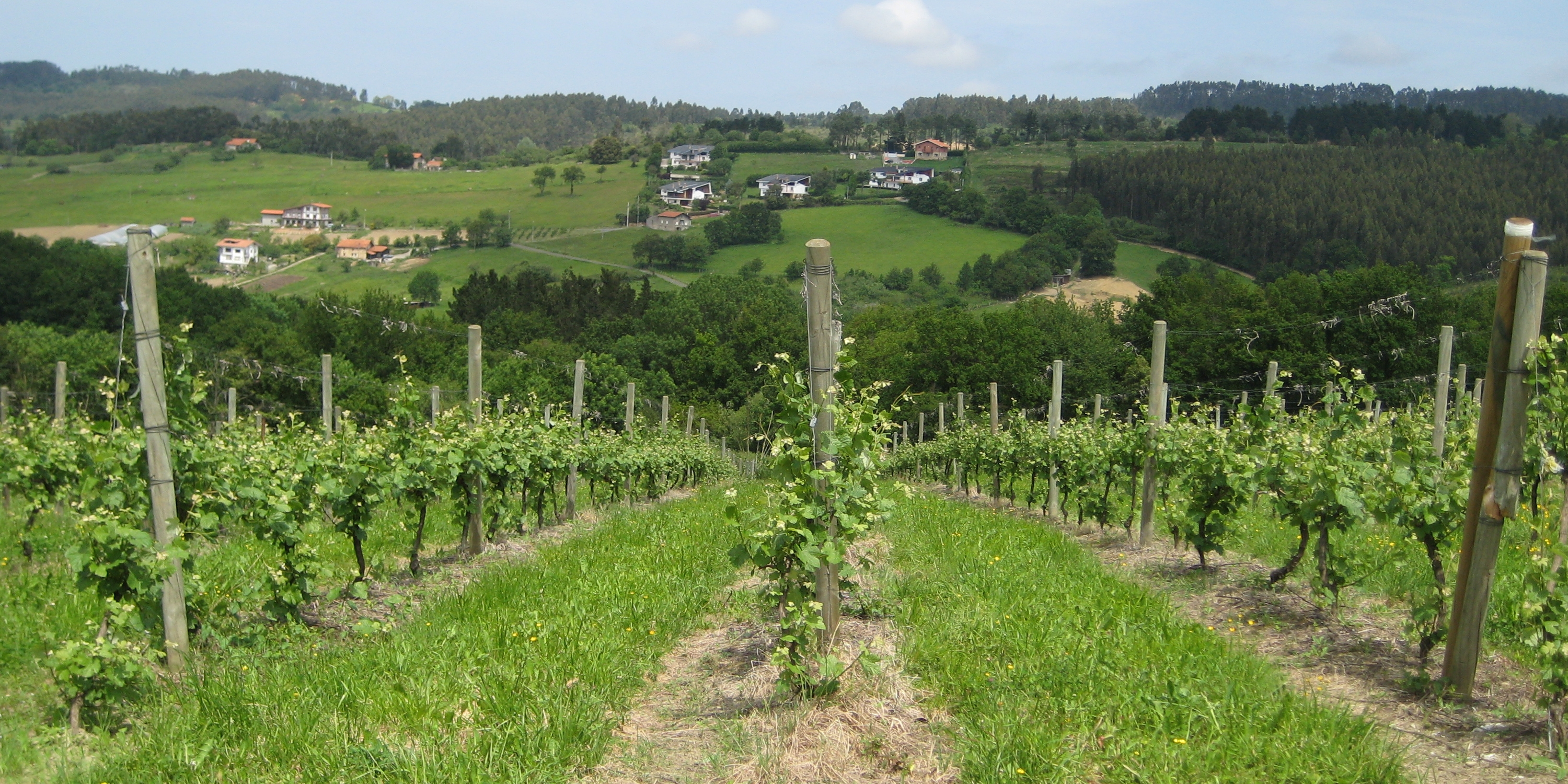
Txakoli vines near Erandio

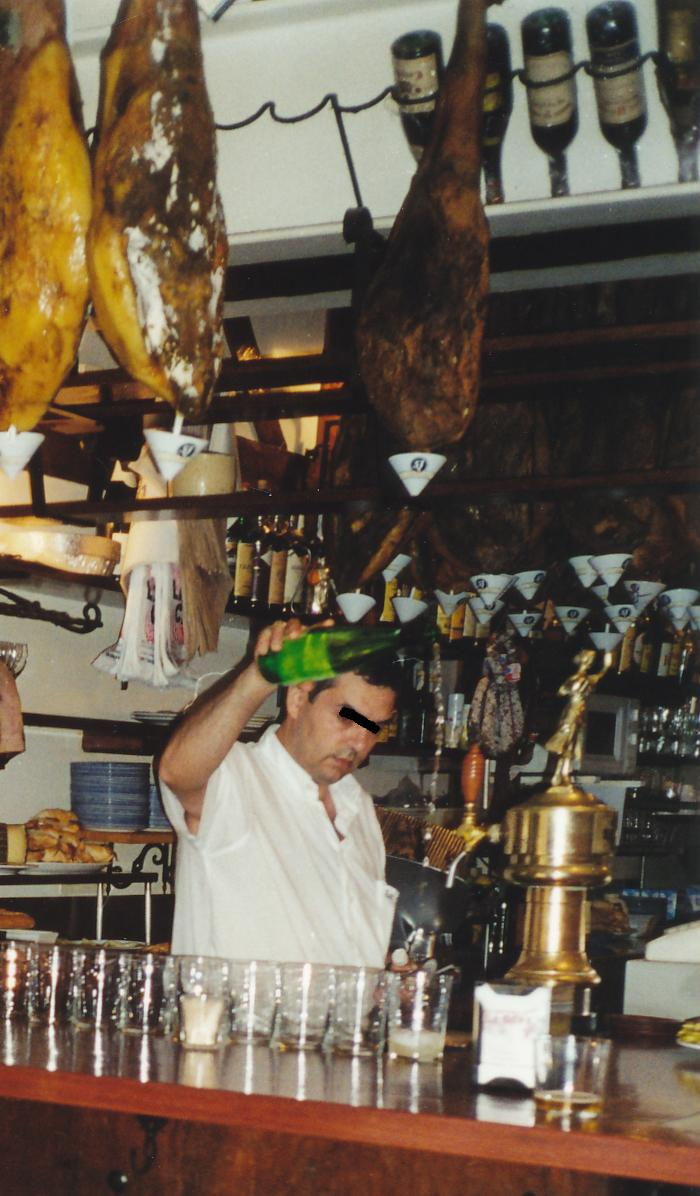
Serving Txakoli in San Sebastián

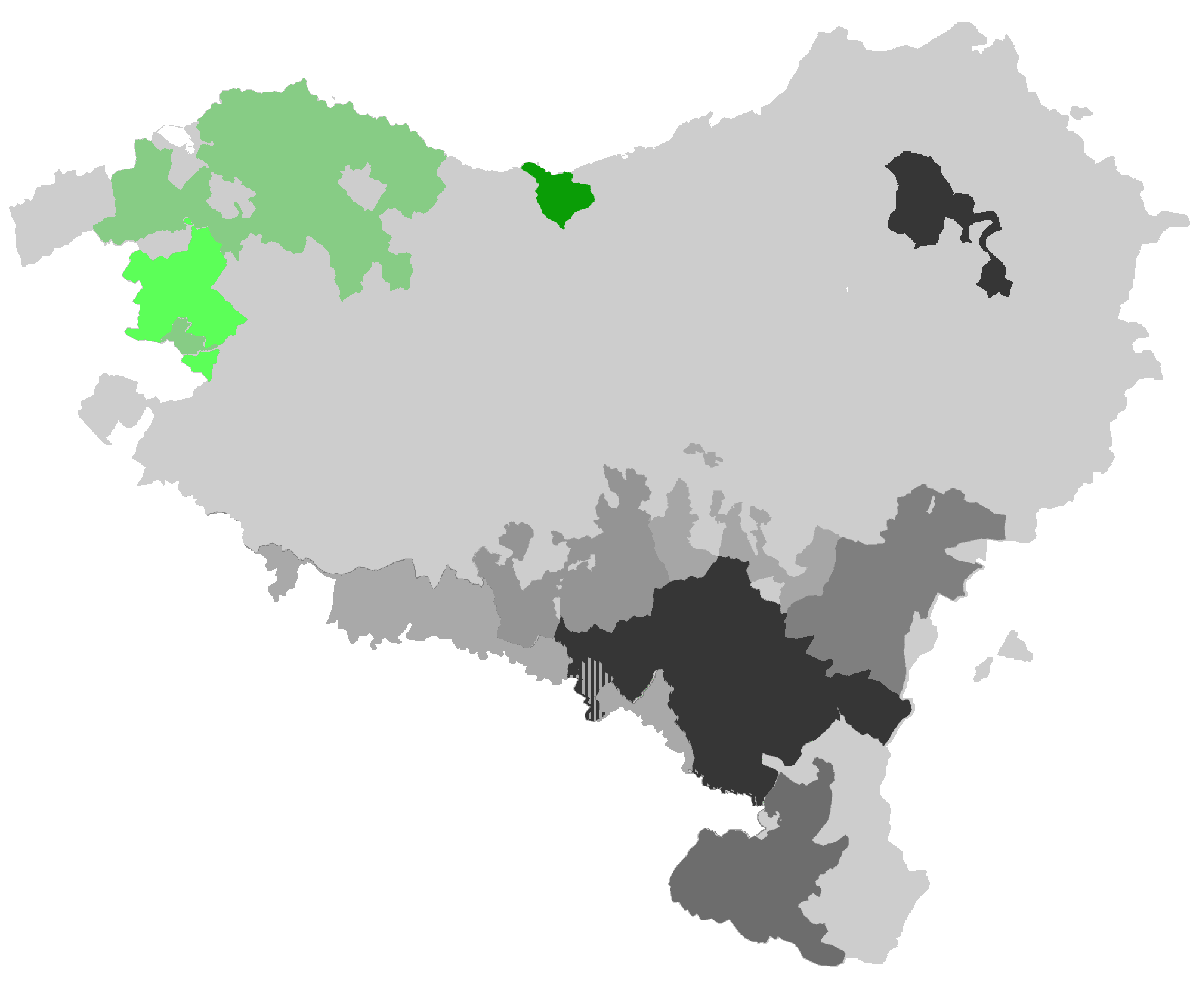
The three txakoli-producing regions in the Basque Country: Alavan Txakoli Biscayan Txakoli Getaria Txakoli

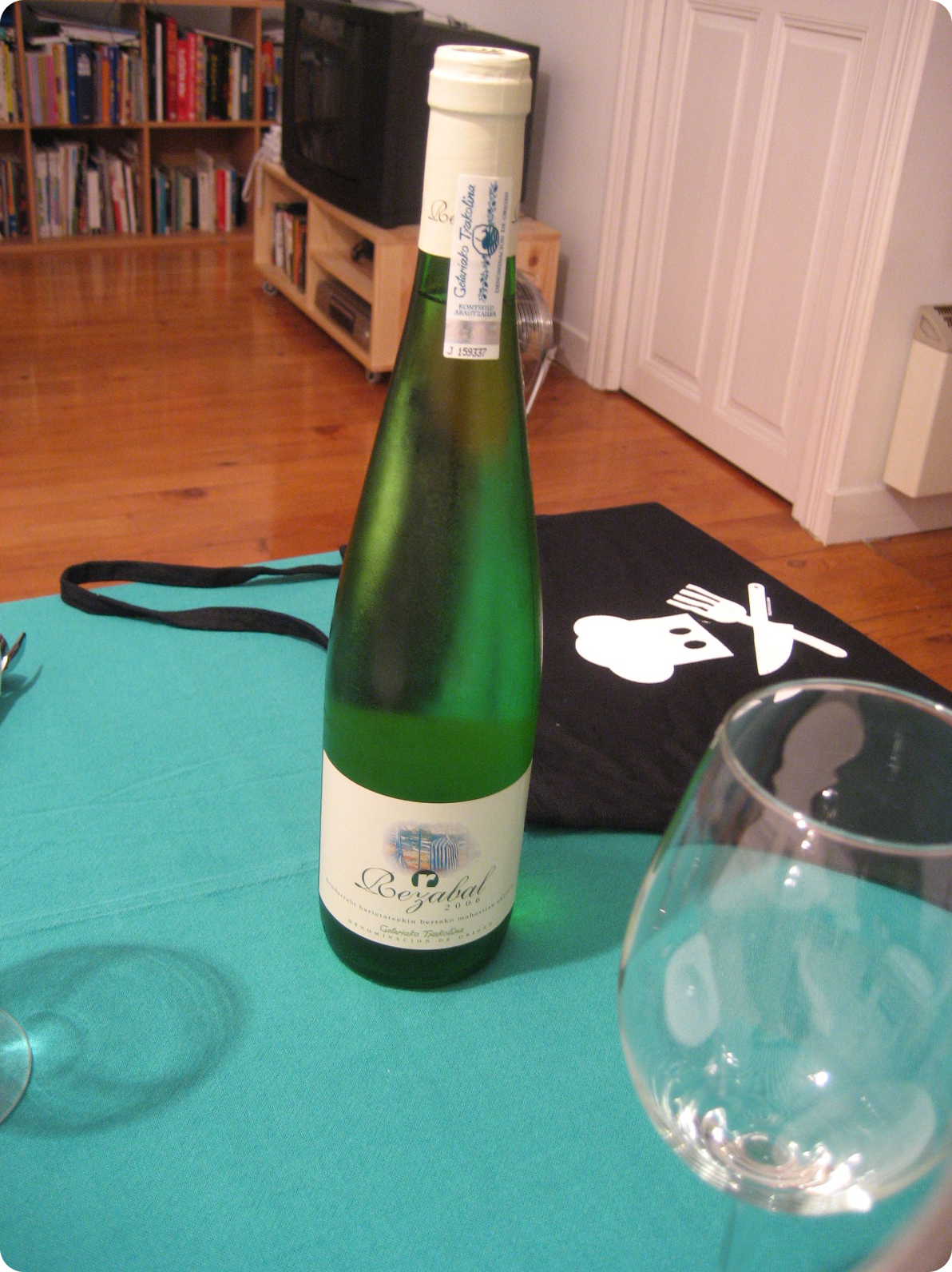
A bottle of Getaria txakoli

Txakoli or chacolí (pronounced [tʃakoˈli]) is a slightly sparkling, very dry white wine with high acidity and low alcohol content produced in the Spanish Basque Country, Cantabria and northern Burgos in Spain. Further afield, Chile is also a minor producer.

It is normally served as an aperitif and drunk within one year of bottling as it cannot be stored for longer. The most common, white, variety has a pale green color, but there are red and rosé varieties. When served, it is normally poured into tall glasses from a height, often as an accompaniment to pintxos. It typically has between 9.5 and 11.5 ABV.

The 18th century Palace of Mendibile in Leioa near Bilbao today houses a museum dedicated to txakoli, the Museo del Txakoli, explaining the history of txakoli and with a large collection of machinery used for making it.

== Name ==
This wine is called txakolin (pronounced [tʃako'lin]) in Basque, txakolina meaning "the txakolin". The term is attested from the middle of the 18th century onwards, occasionally also as a personal name. Traditionally the general form has been txakolin, although xakolin has been documented in Iparralde. Txakoli, considered a misspelling by the Euskaltzaindia, is attested from 1985 onwards. Derived forms are based on the root txakolin, for example txakolin-ardo (txakoli wine), txakolin-dantza (txakoli dance), txakolin-saltze (txakoli sale), txakolin gorri (red txakoli) or txakolin-etxe (txakoli house).

This wine is called chacolí (pronounced [tʃakoˈli]) in Spanish, a word that comes from the Basque txakolin. The first reference to the name of this wine in Spanish was vino chacolín in a document from the Basque Country in 1520. The wine is occasionally called chacoli in French.

Most authors assume a Basque origin but the origin of the word is ultimately unknown, except for the ending -in which frequently occurs in liquids (cf ozpin "vinegar", pitipin or txuzpin "watered wines"), the word is obscure.

Amongst the more fanciful attempts at derivation is a suggested origin from etxeko ain (just enough for the home). Others opt for a French origin as it initially appeared as a term to identify French wines in villages of eastern Gipuzkoa. There are also authors who suggest a Spanish origin of the term.

== History ==
Until the 1980s, txakoli was a home-made wine, drunk in the Basque Country, Cantabria and Valle de Mena, and almost in danger of dying out towards the middle of the 19th century. However, since some varieties of txakoli in the Basque Country managed to achieve denominación de origen certification from 1989 onwards, its quality, spread and appeal have increased.

== Varieties ==
Txakoli is traditionally fermented in foudres (very old, large oak barrels) but most txakoli produced today is fermented in stainless steel vats. There are three DO certified varieties.

Most txakoli is grown in the Atlantic regions of the Basque Country, areas with high rainfall (between 1000 mm and 1600 mm of annual rainfall on average) and average temperatures between 7.5 °C and 18.7 °C, occasionally suffering from frost.

=== Txakoli from Getaria ===
Getariako Txakolina in Basque, Chacolí de Guetaria in Spanish. This variety comes from a small region in Gipuzkoa around the towns of Getaria, Zarautz and Aia and is of a very pale yellow to green color. This was the first variety of txakoli to receive the DO certification in 1989.

The cultivated area has increased from 60 ha to 177 ha since certification. Annually some 900,000 liters (240,000 U.S. gal) are produced in this area, mostly on south-east facing slopes to protect the vines from the harsh Atlantic weather. Unlike the other varieties which are grown as most varieties of grapes, the grapes for this txakoli are grown according to the treille or trellis system (called parra in Basque). In this system, the vines are cultivated at a greater height above the ground, with the foliage forming a contiguous canopy to improve the microclimate. The white variety used is Hondarribi Zuri, the red grape is Hondarribi Beltza.

In recent years, other towns in Gipuzkoa have also started producing txakoli under this DO certification, including Orio, Zumaia, Arrasate, Eibar, Mutriku, Deba, Zestoa, Hondarribia, Villabona, Urnieta, Oñati, Beizama, Zerain and Olaberria.

=== Txakoli from Biscay ===
Bizkaiko Txakolina in Basque, Chacolí de Vizcaya in Spanish. This variety is made in most parts of Biscay, except for the far western end. This was the second txakoli to receive the DO certification in 1994.

It is grown on approximately 150 ha by 85 villages and towns throughout Biscay, producing some 700,000 liters (180,000 U.S. gal) of txakoli annually. Records of wine making in this region go back to the 8th century and references to txakoli go back several centuries themselves. The quality of the txakoli varies, as the microclimatic conditions vary.

Both white and red grapes are used for making txakoli in Biscay. White varieties are Hondarribi Zuria and Folle blanche (called Munemahatsa in Biscay); the red variety used is Hondarribi Beltza ("black Hondarribia").

Historically another light red variety called Oilar Begi ("chicken eye") was also used. This variety had almost become extinct and is making a slow comeback.

=== Txakoli from Alava ===
Arabako Txakolina in Basque, Chacolí de Álava in Spanish. This variety comes from the far north-western end of Álava. It is the youngest of the three DO varieties of txakoli, having gained certification in 2001. It is yellowish in color, very acidic and slightly frothy.

It is grown over some 55 ha of land around the towns of Aiara, Amurrio, Artziniega, Laudio and Okondo. Wine-making has a long tradition in this region, going back as far as 760 AD in the historical record. In the late 19th century, grapes were grown on more than 500 ha of land, declining to 5ha in the late 20th century before the recent revival.

The most commonly used grape for this txakoli is Hondarribi Zuria ("white Hondarribia") but other grapes are also permitted: Bordeleza Zuria (Folle Blanche), Izkiriota Ttipia (Petit Manseng), Izkiriota (Gros Manseng) and Courbu.

=== Chacolí from Cantabria ===
Chacolí, in the original common French, Spanish and Basque spelling chacoli, was traditional also in the region of Cantabria until the end of the 19th century. Great amounts of wine were consumed and exported from the 13th to the 19th century, produced in the comarca of Trasmiera, with villages including Colindres, Arnuero, Meruelo, Argoños and Noja as the main vineyards and production areas of chacolí. The production of wine in Cantabria, even in the middle of the 20th century, far exceeded that of the Basque provinces. In Cantabria there are two wine geographical indications (one step below the DO) created in 2004 and 2005: Liébana wine and Costa de Cantabria wine. The Cantabrian region where the wine was called chacolí is included in the Costa de Cantabria wine GI. Chacolí is still produced in Cantabria, but on a very limited scale.

=== Chacolí from Burgos ===
It is also still produced in the Valle de Mena in the province of Burgos, included in the Castilla y León wine GI created in 2005, where efforts are being made to receive DO certification.

=== Chacolí from Chile ===
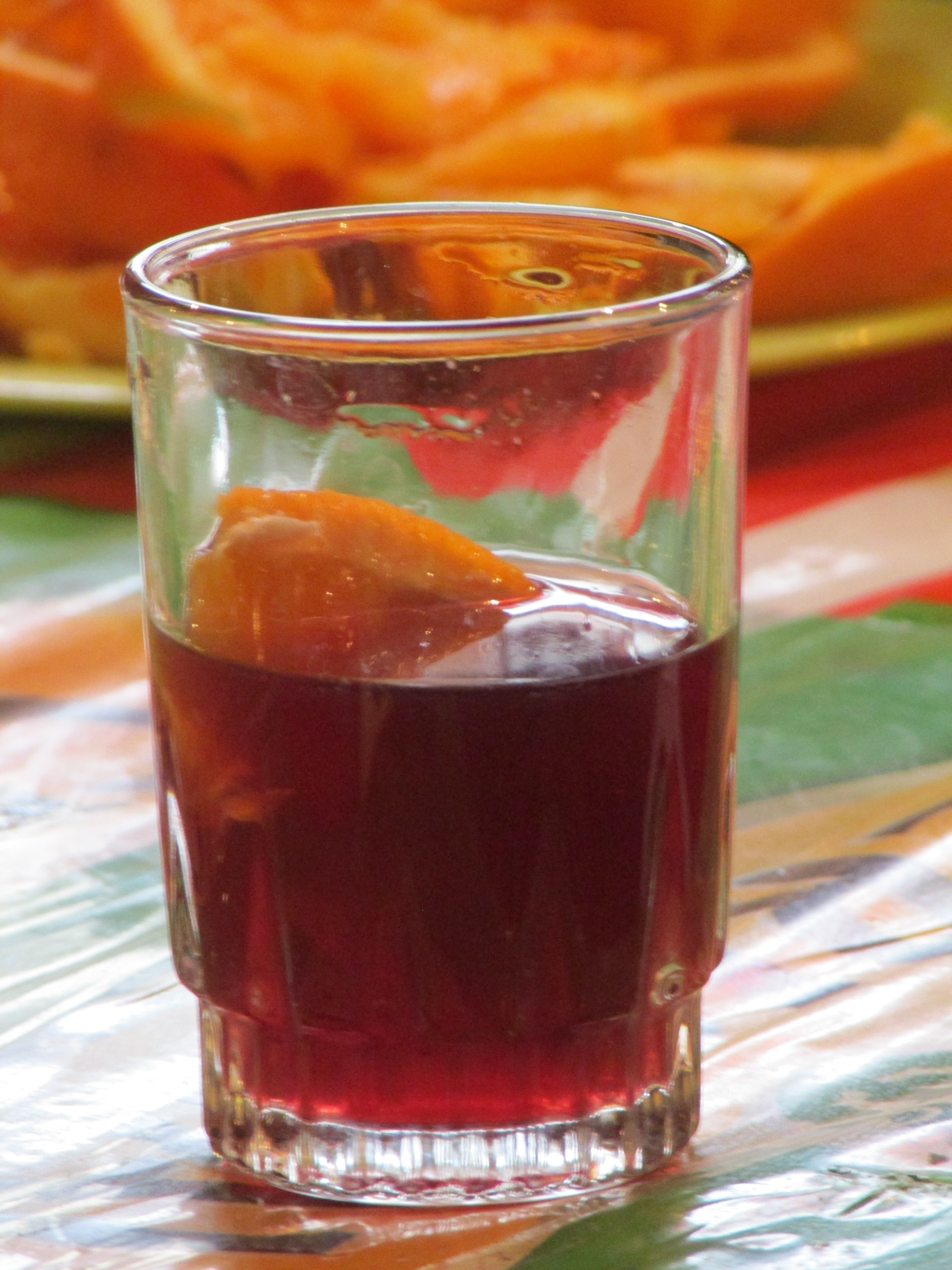
Chilean chacolí with orange slices

In Chile, a wine called chacolí has been made for centuries: «The permanence until today of two alcoholic beverages of Spanish origin, one called Pajarete, produced in the valley of the Huasco River and the valley of the Elqui River and, the other, chacolí, A genuine product of the Copiapó Valley and the Choapa Valley, it is a historical testimony of the adaptation and reproduction of certain European products to recreate the daily life of their cultural and telluric origins.»

In the town of Doñihue in the Cachapoal Valley, the "Fiesta del Chacolí" is celebrated annually.
