= Getaria, Spain =

Getaria
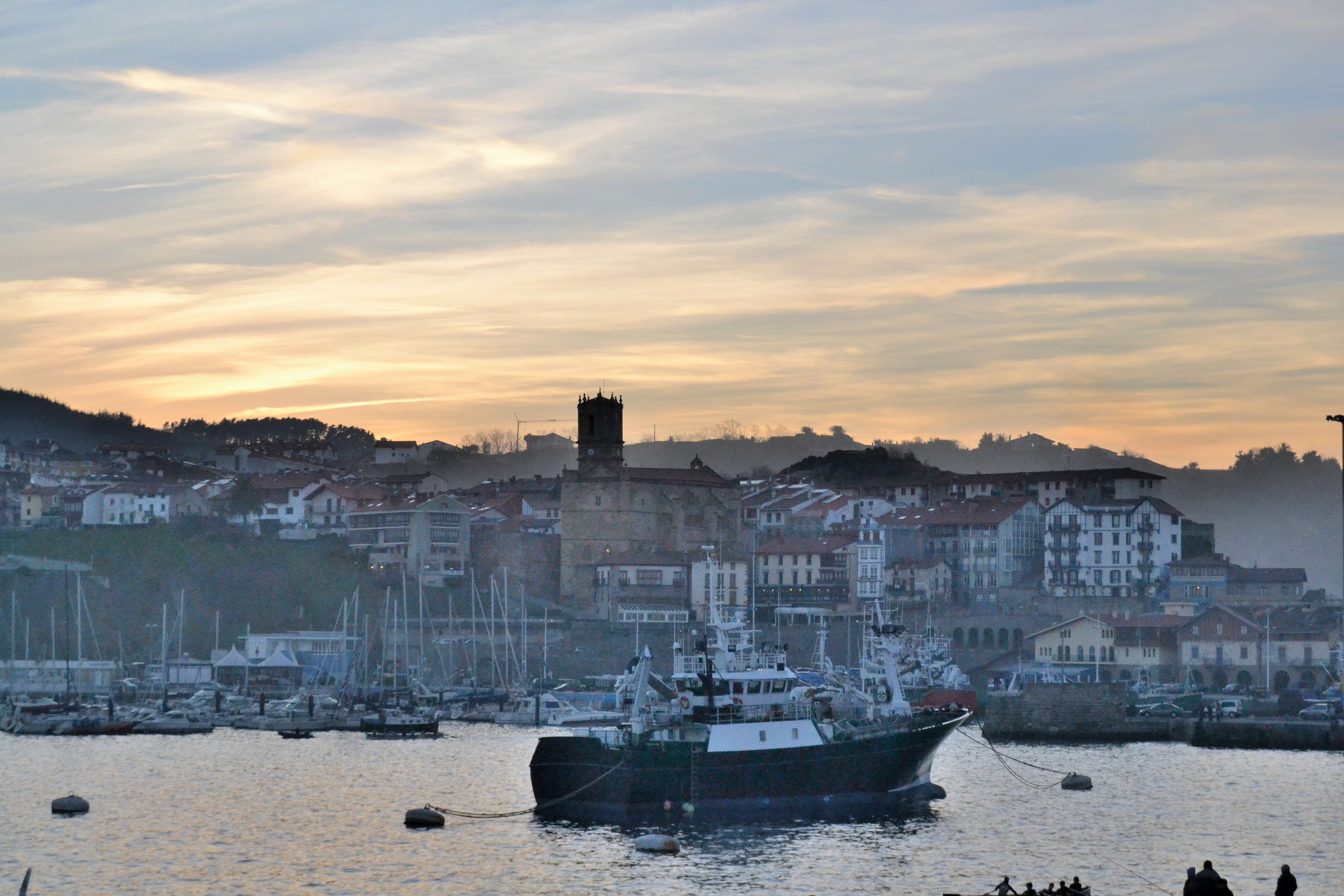
- Getaria view from the sea

- Coat of arms

- Location of Getaria within the Basque Country Location of Getaria within Spain
- Coordinates: 43°18′16″N 2°12′13″W
- Country: Spain
- Autonomous community: Basque Country
- Province: Gipuzkoa
- Comarca: Urola Kosta
- Established: 2011

Government
  - Mayor: Nika Lertxundi (Bildu)

Area
  - Total: 10.6 km^{2} (4.1 sq mi)

Population (2025-01-01)
  - Total: 2,887
  - Density: 272/km^{2} (705/sq mi)
- Time zone: UTC+1 (CET)
  - Summer (DST): UTC+2 (CEST)
- Postal code: 20808
- Area code: 34 (Spain) + 943 (Gipuzkoa)

Getaria is a town on the Urola coast, in the province of Gipuzkoa, in the autonomous community of the Basque Country, in northern Spain. It borders Zarautz to the east and Zumaia to the west.

Getaria is well known for being the hometown of Juan Sebastián Elcano: a sailor famous for being the first to circumnavigate the world. He was the captain of the Nao Victoria, the only ship in Magellan's ill-fated fleet to complete the voyage.

Today, Getaria is also famous for its restaurants that serve grilled fish and white wine with a Denomination of Origin somewhere in the Getariako Txakolina near the town. The town is also home to the Cristobal Balenciaga Museum.

In May 2012, a two-man team from Getaria won Google's 'Model Your Town' competition by creating a complete 3D representation of their home town.

== Etymology ==
Traditionally, the name of the city was written as Guetaria. Since 1980, however, the official toponym has been Getaria, which is an adaptation of the modern Basque orthography. Thus, in Spanish it is written Guetaria, and in Basque, although pronounced the same way, it is written Getaria.

Apart from Getaria in Gipuzkoa, there is another town 61 kilometres up the coast in Lapurdi (Labourd), in the French Basque Country, which is called Guéthary in French, but the Basque pronunciation and spelling of the two towns is the same. Both towns are located on the Basque coast, and throughout history many have sought the origin of the towns' names. The most convincing hypothesis, based on archaeological evidence, is that the name of Getaria comes from the Latin word "cetaria". In classical Latin, pronounced [ketaria], it means "a place where fish is preserved". Indeed, evidence of Roman fish canneries has been found in both places.

Another possible origin of the name is "guaita" in the Gascon language which means "lookout". During the Middle Ages, various villages on the Basque coast were colonized by Gascons, and among these villages both Getarias could be found. Therefore, it was believed that Getari could be the result of a mix between "guaita" and "–ari": a suffix that is used in the Basque language for professions and means vigilante. For others, though, the name of Getaria results from the mix of "guaita" and "–erri", meaning town, creating a word that means the town of the vigilant.

== Geography ==
The municipality of Getaria occupies part of the central coast of Gipuzkoa, in the Cantabrian Sea. This stretch of coast is made up of a steep cliff where erosion has created a series of coves and points.

The historic quarter of Getaria is located between the mainland and Mount San Antón, known as the Mouse of Getaria because of its mouse-like shape. This mountain, which characterises the town, was an island until the 16th century.

In the interior of the municipality is Mount Garate (278 m). It runs parallel to the coast and on its smooth slopes are several farms belonging to the municipality of Getaria. These farms, called baserri, are typical of the Basque Country. Almost all the land between Garate and the coast is covered with vineyards, due to the microclimate that this area generates.

== History ==
The beginnings of a village in what is now Getaria could have been found in Roman times, as evidenced by the discovery of an "ace" from the earlier pre-imperial period, 2 BC.

=== The Middle Ages ===
The village of Getaria was founded between 1180 and 1194 by King Sancho VI of Navarre, making it one of the oldest towns in the province, along with San Sebastián. In the second half of the 12th century, the expansion and domination of the Cantabrian ports was a priority for the Kings of Navarre. After the conquest of Gipuzkoa around the year 1200, King Alfonso VIII of Castile confirmed his Fuero "eo modo quo rex Navarra illud dedit vobis habendum" in San Sebastián on 1 September 1209. In 1571, the historian Esteban de Garibay confirmed the Navarrese origin of the village in his book Compendio Historial, stating that in 1209 Alfonso VIII granted Getaria the Fuero of San Sebastián, thus confirming its jurisdiction within Navarre. Finally, the "Diccionario Geográfico-Histórico de España (1845-1850)" states that the town archives contain a letter from King Alfonso VIII of Burgos dated 20 January 1201. In this letter it is stated that the inhabitants of Getaria had the right to pasture, water, meadows and forests. It is therefore clear that Getaria was founded by the Kings of Navarre.

Throughout its history, Getaria has enjoyed various privileges that attest to its status as a town. Here are some of them:

- 1270: Sancion to cut in Gipuzkoa all the timber and firewood they needed to build their houses and ships.
- 1290: Exemption from tolls and other taxes in the Kingdom of Castile and León.
- 1407: The ships that brought wheat and other cereals to the beach of La Concha and the town's dock had to unload half of their cargo.

As far as the maritime activities of the city were concerned, they were the main source of income for the city in the Middle Ages. In the fifteenth century, the gap that existed between the island of San Antón and the historic centre was closed. The port is located to the south of the island and was traditionally used as a whaling port. In fact, in 1878 the last whale was caught in nearby waters by fishermen from Zarautz and Getaria, who managed to bring it to the port. Today it is an important port on the Basque coast.

=== The Thirty Years' War ===
During the Thirty Years' War, in the summer of 1638, Cardinal Richelieu planned a campaign to annex the strategic territory of Gipuzkoa. To achieve this, he wanted to occupy Hondarribia with 20,000 soldiers. He also needed a port to accommodate a fleet of 50 ships that would destroy any plan to relieve Hondarribia. The port of Getaria was therefore chosen for this strategic plan. On 24 July 1638, the Spanish fleet under the command of Admiral Lope de Hoces was attacked from Getaria. Only one Spanish galleon survived the attack. However, when the troops of Geoffrey II (Archbishop of Bordeaux) tried to take the town, they were destroyed by the defenders of Getaria and Zarautz and reinforcements from neighbouring towns. Finally, the village was destroyed by the artillery of the French galleons, but not a single French soldier came close to its walls. Soon after, on 7 September, the siege of Hondarribia would fail.

=== Peninsular War ===
During the Peninsular War, in 1811, Getaria was occupied by French troops, who left in 1813 after causing considerable damage.

=== Carlist Wars ===
During the Carlist Wars, in 1835, the village was once again practically destroyed. After being besieged by the Carlists, it was finally taken in 1836 and set on fire from several points,[citation needed] leaving only 16 houses badly damaged. The parish church, in particular, suffered the effects of the attack and required extensive repairs.

== Economy ==
Getaria's main sources of income are fishing, tourism and the cultivation of Txakoli.

At the beginning of the nineteenth century, the people of this village worked more in agriculture than in fishing, and they produced the best txakoli in Gipuzkoa. Nowadays, txakoli is still produced, but in smaller quantities. Fishing has therefore become the main source of income. Nowadays, however, fishing is in decline.

Cider is also produced in the Askizu, Akerregi and Meagas districts.

== Administration ==
Municipal elections in Getaria
Political party	2011		2007	
Political party	Votes %	Councillors	Votes %	Councillors
Bildu	46,67%	5	-	-
Partido Nacionalista Vasco (EAJ-PNV)	40,46%	5	62,31%	8
Aralar	9,57%	1	23,04%	2
Eusko Alkartasuna (EA)	-	-	7,93%	1

== Bibliography ==
- Getaria. Una Historia desconocida (1397–1797).
- Celdrán Gomáriz, Pancracio (2004). Diccionario de topónimos españoles y sus gentilicios (5ª edición). Madrid: Espasa-Calpe. p. 382. ISBN 978-84-670-3054-9.
- Nieto Ballester, Emilio (1997). Breve diccionario de topónimos españoles. Madrid:Alianza Editorial. p. 183. ISBN 84-206-9487-8.
- Idoia Arrieta Elizalde: «Getaria: nafar fundazioa duen hiribildua», BERRIA, 2009-09-08.
- Arrieta, Idoia: "Donostiaren konkistaren agiri ezkutuaren aurkezpena: ikerketaren ibilbidea eta ekarpen historiko-kritikoa" (pp. 227–248). En: 1512. Los territorios vascos y el Estado navarro. Actas del II Congreso de Historiadores de Navarra. San Sebastián: Txertoa, 2011. p. 234.
- Martínez Díez, G.; González Díez, E.; Martínez Llorente, F.J.: Colección de documentos medievales de las villas guipuzcoanas (1200–1369). San Sebastián: Diputación Foral de Guipúzcoa, 1991. p. 21.Dicho libro se encuentra en formato pdf. en la siguiente dirección. Citado por: Arrieta Elizalde, Idoia: «Getaria: nafar fundazioa duen hiribildua», BERRIA, 2009-09-08.
- Idoia Arrieta Elizalde: «Getaria: nafar fundazioa duen hiribildua», BERRIA, 2009-09-08.
- Garibay y Zamalloa, Esteban de: Compendio historial de las Chronicas y universal historia de todos los reynos de España...(1571), libro XII, capítulo 32, p. 734. Citado por: Arrieta, Idoia: "Donostiaren konkistaren agiri ezkutuaren aurkezpena"...Op. Cit., 233.
- Getaria. La concesión del titulo de "villa".
- Idoia Arrieta Elizalde: «Getaria: nafar fundazioa duen hiribildua», BERRIA, 2009-09-08.
- Martínez de Isasi, Lope: Compendio Historial de Guipúzcoa (1625). Bilbao: La Gran Enciclopedia Vasca, 1972. p. 586. Citado por: Arrieta, Idoia: "Donostiaren konkistaren agiri ezkutuaren aurkezpena"...Op. Cit., 233.
- Idoia Arrieta Elizalde: «Getaria: nafar fundazioa duen hiribildua», BERRIA, 2009-09-08.
- Caro Baroja, Julio: Los vascos y la historia a través de Garibay. San Sebastián: Diputación Foral de Guipúzcoa, 2002. pp. 40–45. [Reedición debido al 30 aniversario de su primera publicación]. Citado por: Arrieta, Idoia: "Donostiaren konkistaren agiri ezkutuaren aurkezpena"...Op. Cit. p. 233.
- Arrieta, Idoia: "Donostiaren konkistaren agiri ezkutuaren aurkezpena"...Op. cit., p. 235.
- Getaria. Una Historia desconocida (1397–1797).

== See also ==
- San Anton
