= Courbu =

Variety of grape

Courbu is the name of three different, but related varieties of wine grapes primarily found in South West France. All are Vitis vinifera grapes. The name Courbu, without suffix, can refer to both Petit Courbu and Courbu blanc, and not all sources differ between the two.

== Petit Courbu ==
Petit Courbu is a white wine grape from Gascony with a long history in the region. It adds body and contributes aromas of citrus and honey to the wines. It is found in Pacherenc du Vic-Bilh AOC and other appellations of the region.

It is known under the synonyms Courbu and Courbu Petit.

== Courbu blanc ==
Courbu blanc is found primarily in the Basque areas, such as Irouléguy AOC. It is similar to Petit Courbu, but has darker young leaves.

It is known under the synonyms Bordeleza Zuria, Chacoli Zuria, Cougnet, Courbeau, Courbi blanc, Courbies, Courbis, Courbu, Courbu Gros, Courbut, Courbut blanc, Courtoisie, Hondarrabi Zuri, Hondarribi Zuri, Ondaria Zuria and Vieux Pacherenc.

== Courbu noir ==
Courbu noir is a speciality of Béarn, but is now almost extinct.

It is known under the synonyms Courbu rouge and Dolceolo.

== Other grapes ==
Courbu rouge, which can refer to Courbu noir, is also a synonym of Manseng noir.
