= Vineyards of the Basque Country =

Wine regions of the Basque Country

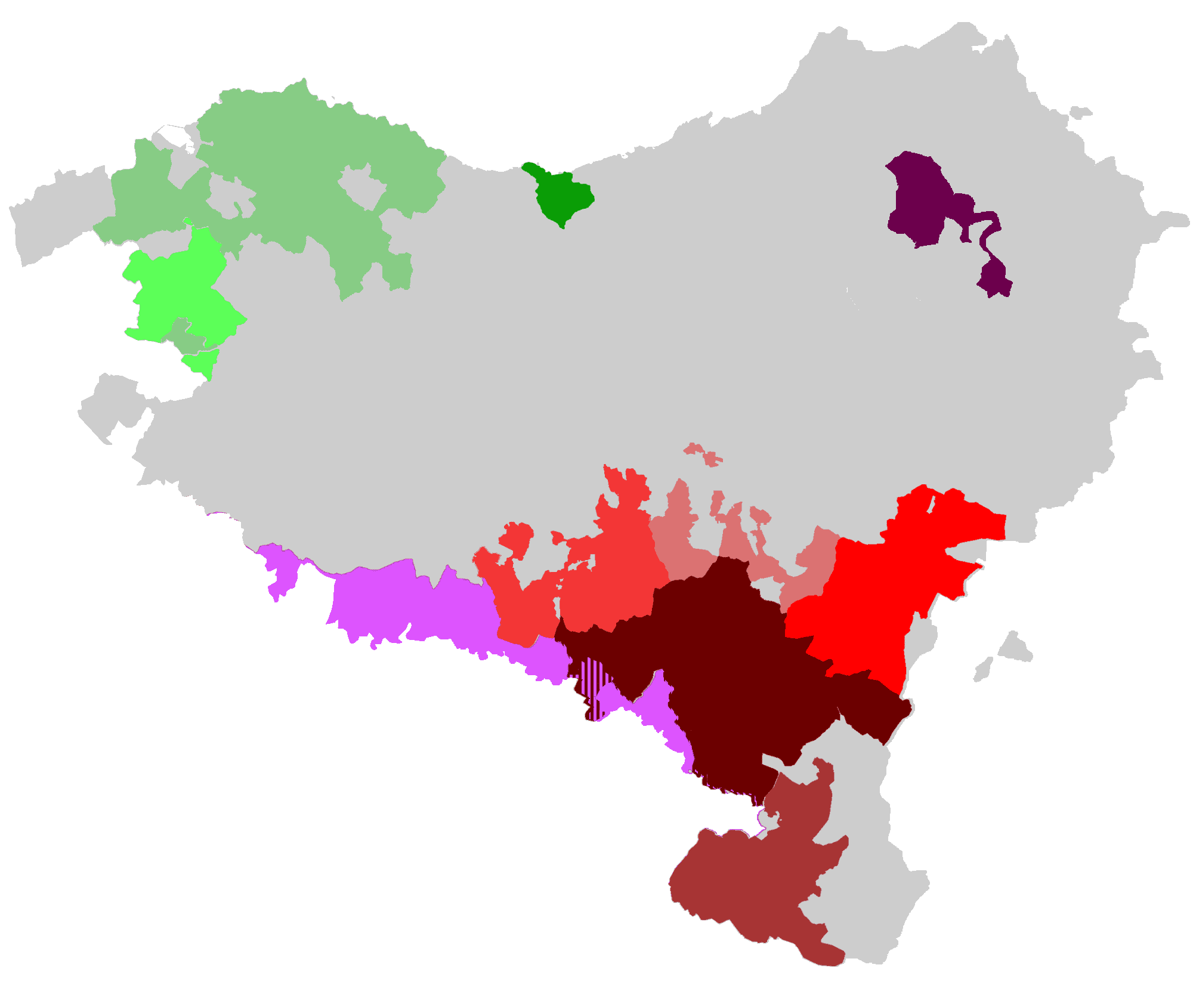
Map of vineyards in the Basque Country and Navarre: The D.O. Navarra: Behe Erribera or Ribera Baja Goi Erribera or Ribera Alta Lizarraldea or Tierra Estella Izarbeibarra or Valdizarbe Behe Mendialdea or Baja Montaña / Vineyards of La Rioja: The D.O.C. Rioja Irouléguy Vineyard: Irulegiko Arnoa The Txakoli: From Álava From Biscay From Getaria

The vineyards of the Basque Country (Euskal herriko mahastiak in Basque) are located in both the French Basque Country (or Iparralde) and the Spanish Basque Country (or Hegoalde). The region has a historical involvement with viticulture, which is reflected in various designations of origin and diverse terroirs.

Viticulture in the area is believed to have originated with the Bituriges Vivisques, who cultivated vines between the mouth of the Gironde and the foothills of the Pyrenees. The presence of wild vines in the valleys of Cantabria, the Basque Country, and Béarn facilitated the selection of Pyreneo-Atlantic grape varieties. This form of viticulture developed with limited Roman influence, which is uncommon in Western Europe.

During the Middle Ages, pilgrimage routes to Santiago de Compostela contributed to vineyard expansion. Monks from Roncesvalles Abbey, who maintained hospices along these routes, cultivated vineyards from the priory of Irouléguy to Fontarrabie. Grape varieties used during this period were similar to those still found in the region. These varieties, though modified over time, are present in the vineyards of Irouléguy, Rioja, Txakoli, and Navarre.

High and semi-high vine training systems are used in the region. The characteristics of the wines produced are influenced by the local terroirs.

== History ==
Viticulture in the Basque region is believed to have originated with the Bituriges Vivisques, a Celtic group that settled near the mouth of the Gironde around the 1st century BCE. Through contact with Roman Narbonnaise, they adopted vine cultivation and began selecting grape plants suited to the local environment. This led to the emergence of the Biturica grape, considered a precursor to modern Cabernet varieties, and adapted to the humid conditions of the Iberian and Aquitanian coasts.

The Bituriges maintained interactions with the Aquitanians, or Proto-Basques, (Note: The latter term is used less frequently, to avoid any confusion between protohistoric populations and today's Basques.) and by 72 BCE, a major inland route connected Bordeaux to Astorga (Asturica Augusta), passing along the Basque coast and through the settlement of Iruña-Veleia. Pliny the Elder, in his Natural History, refers to a grape variety introduced by the Bituriges, which may have played a role in establishing early vineyards in the area. The presence of wild vines in the Pyrenean foothills and cultivated varieties along the Bay of Biscay suggests the development of viticulture prior to the Roman annexation of Aquitaine.

In the region, grape varieties developed through the empirical selection of wild, hermaphroditic vine forms native to the valleys of Cantabria, the Basque Country, and Béarn. These selections produced types capable of wine production under local conditions.

During the Middle Ages, pilgrimage routes to Santiago de Compostela—from Le Puy-en-Velay, Vézelay, Orléans, and Arles—passed through the Basque territories. Monks from the Abbey of Roncesvalles established vineyards using regional grape varieties between Irouléguy and Fontarrabie (Hondarribia), including early forms of Tannat, Manseng, and Courbu. Although altered in the 19th and 20th centuries, these varieties remain in cultivation in Irouléguy, Rioja, Txakoli, and Navarre.

The occurrence of lambrusks (wild grapevines) in the Pyrenean valleys contributed to the development of new varieties through seedling selection and hybridization. Cistercian monks from regional monasteries are thought to have supported this process. Vineyards were typically planted on high or semi-high slopes, a layout that continues to characterize viticultural practices in the region. Grape varieties adapted to specific microclimates play a key role in defining the characteristics of the resulting wines.

Some populations of wild vines in the Basque region remained unaffected by the phylloxera epidemic of the 19th century. These have served as a source of genetic material for ampelographic research, notably in studies by Pierre Durquéty, who examined their role in grapevine development.

== Etymology ==
In the Basque language, wine is referred to as arnoa in the northern (French) Basque Country and ardoa in the southern region and in standard Basque (batua), with ardua also used in the Souletin dialect. Linguist Koldo Mitxelena identified ardano as a proto-Basque term for wine, serving as the root for these modern variants. This root appears in related terms such as ardanozpin ("wine vinegar") and the hydronym Ardanabia, a tributary of the Adour, which derives from ardan-habia, meaning "river course of vines."

Basque terminology also includes specific classifications based on color. Red wine is referred to as ardo beltza ("black wine"), while rosé is called ardo gorria ("red wine"). The term arnoa is also used as a suffix for other fermented beverages, including garagarnoa (beer, from garagarra, meaning barley) and sagarnoa (cider, from sagara, meaning apple).

== Geographical origin and history of grape varieties ==
A study conducted by INRA Bordeaux and Montpellier, in collaboration with ENSAM Montpellier, found that many grape varieties cultivated in the Basque Country likely originated near the base of the Bay of Biscay and in the humid Pyrenean foothills. During glacial periods, this area is believed to have served as a refuge for Vitis vinifera L., the common grapevine. Over time, both wild and domesticated vine forms evolved and spread from this region, contributing to local varietal diversity.

== Vine-growing methods ==
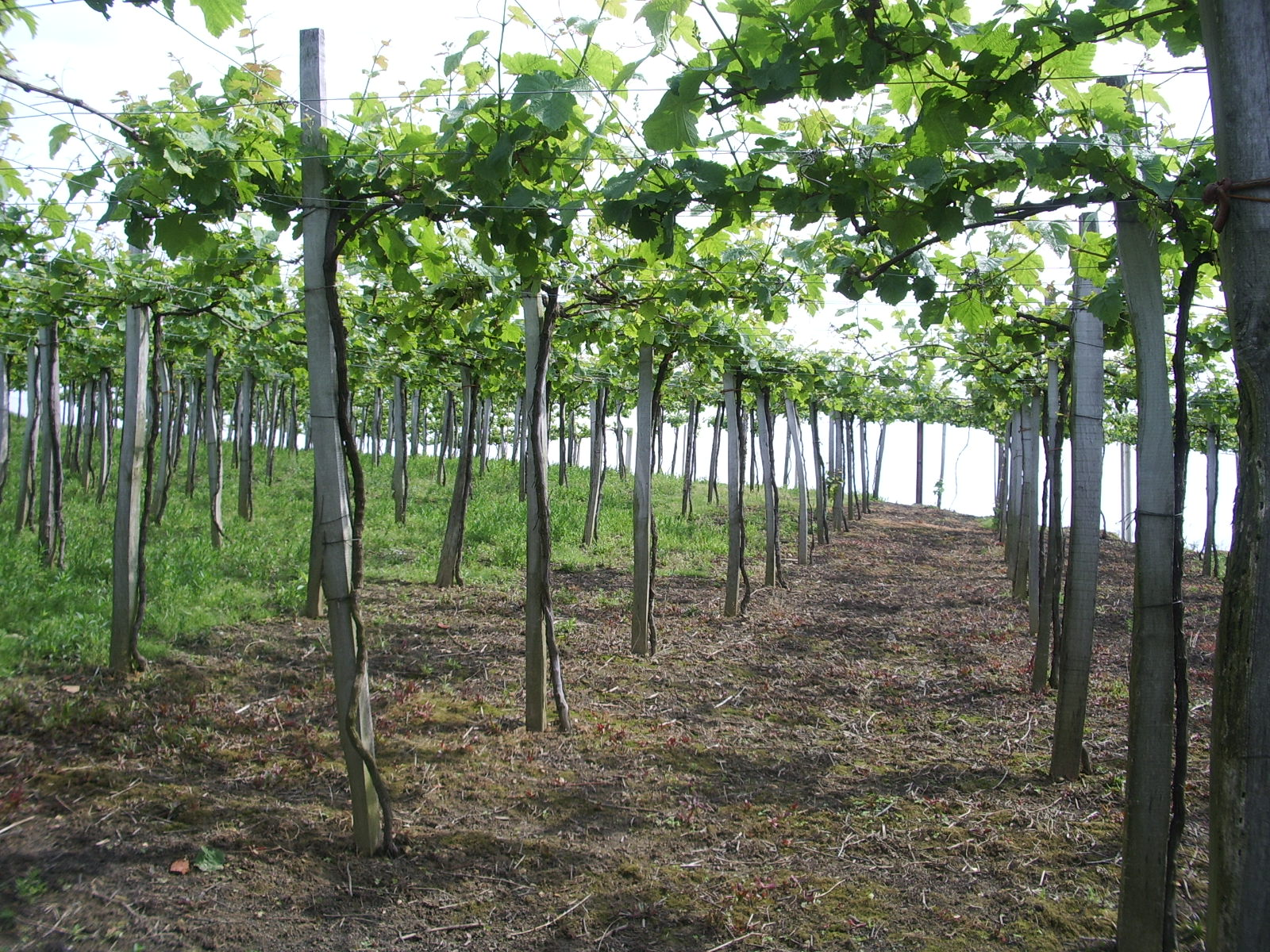
The half-high vines of the Getariako Txakolina vineyard

In the Basque Country, vines are commonly trained using a half-shoot system at a height of approximately 1.10 meters, along with long pruning techniques. Historically, vine heights ranged between 1.50 and 2 meters, particularly in vineyards located in the Pyrenean foothills.

Ampelographers P.M. Durquéty (Note: For P.M. Durquéty's work on grape varieties, see Arinarnoa, Arriloba, Egiodola, Ekigaïna, Liliorila, Perdea and Semebat.) and P. Robert documented similarities in grape varieties cultivated on both the northern and southern slopes of the Pyrenees. Their research led to the identification of a "Basque vineyard" typology, characterized by grape varieties believed to be related to the Carmenets (or sorto-type) family. This group includes Bouchy (Cabernet Franc), Cabernet Sauvignon, Courbu, and Petit Verdot, all of which are thought to descend from the historical Biturica grape.

== The terroir ==
Vineyards in the Basque region are typically situated in areas with minimal spring frost, limited rainfall, and south-facing slopes. These conditions are generally favorable for viticulture. Unlike many other wine-producing regions in France, Basque vineyards are often discontinuous and concentrated in specific microclimates considered optimal for vine cultivation. Some of these sites may have been established prior to Roman viticultural expansion.

== A vineyard untouched by phylloxera ==
Some vineyard plots in the Basque region were not affected by the phylloxera epidemic. In these areas, certain vines—often referred to as "old vines"—can be over a century old.

The region extending from Pau to Bilbao, including the Pyrenean valleys, is noted for the continued presence of wild grapevines (Vitis vinifera subsp. silvestris), locally known as lambrusques. These grow naturally along hedgerows and riverbanks. In Europe, outside of vineyards established on sandy soils (which can support ungrafted vines, or pieds francs), wild Vitis vinifera subsp. silvestris populations remain in only a few locations: the Pyrenees, parts of the Caucasus, and certain Swiss valleys. (Note: This observation helps us to better understand the naming of the Pic de Vignemale, the highest peak in the Pyrenees, and the village of Vignec, near the ski resort of Saint-Lary. These two toponyms are undoubtedly formed from the Basque root gwinn: vine, to which is added, for the first, mala: mountain (cf. Bethmal in Ariège). Still in the Hautes-Pyrénées department, the communes of Vidou and Vidouze most certainly have identical origins.) This subspecies is strictly protected in mainland France.

== Appellations of origin ==
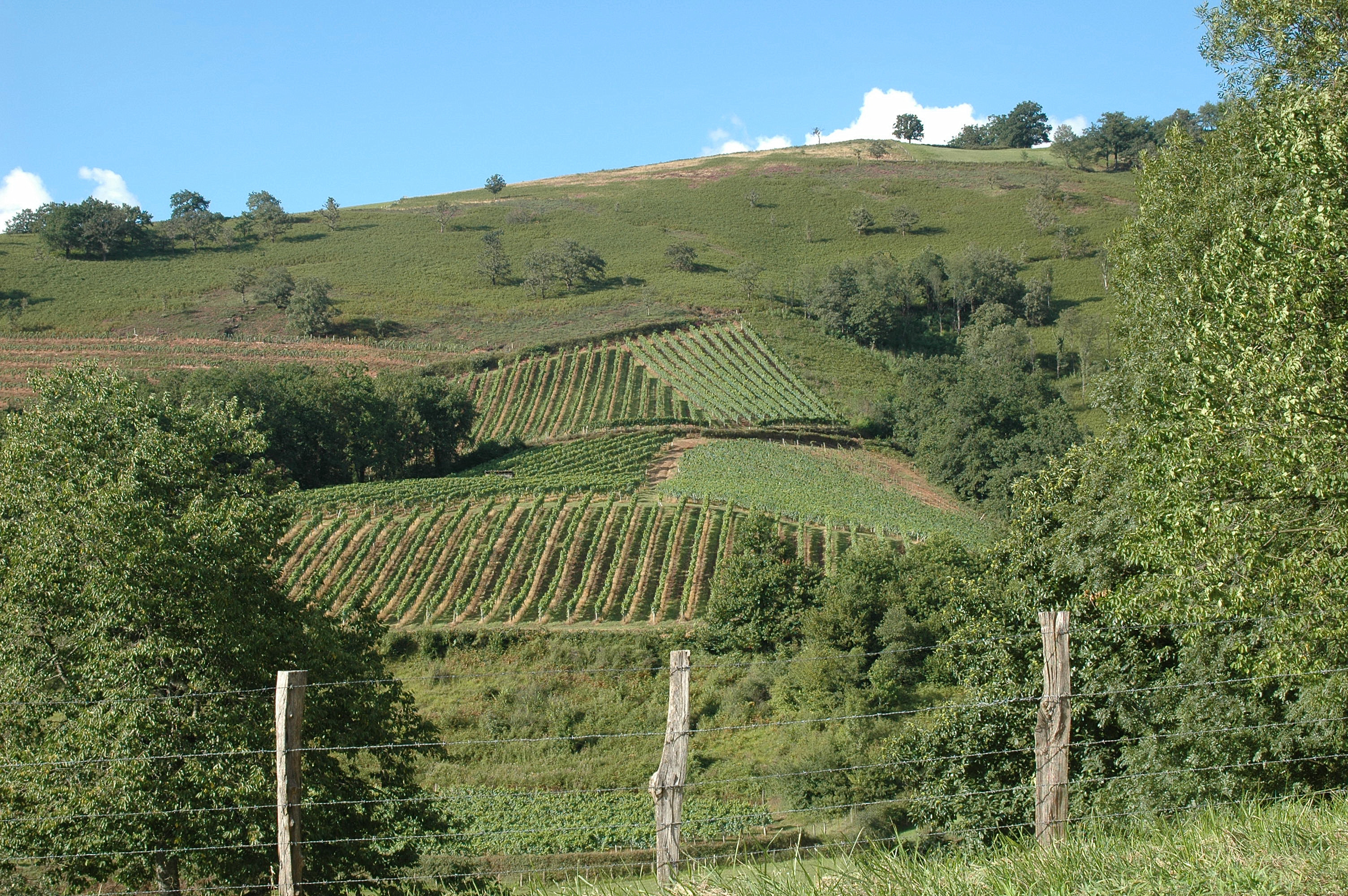
The Irouléguy vineyard in Saint-Étienne de Baïgorry

Among the Basque wine-producing areas, only the Irouléguy appellation (AOC) is located within the French Basque Country. Other recognized appellations are situated in the Spanish Basque Country.

=== AOC Irouléguy ===
The Irouléguy Appellation d'Origine Contrôlée (AOC) is one of the smallest appellations in both France and Europe, covering approximately 240 hectares. It spans around 15 communes (Note: List of towns: Aincille, Anhaux, Ascarat, Bidarray, Bussunarits-Sarrasquette, Bustince-Iriberry, Irouléguy, Ispoure, Jaxu, Lasse, Lecumberry, Ossès, Saint-Étienne-de-Baïgorry, Saint-Jean-le-Vieux and Saint-Martin-d'Arrossa.) in the area surrounding Saint-Étienne-de-Baïgorry, Saint-Jean-Pied-de-Port, and Bidarray. It is named after the village of Irouléguy in Basse-Navarre, which has a population of about 300.

The appellation includes 46 producers: 35 members of a cooperative cultivating about 130 hectares, and 11 independent winegrowers managing the remaining 90 hectares.

==== History of the Irouléguy vineyards ====
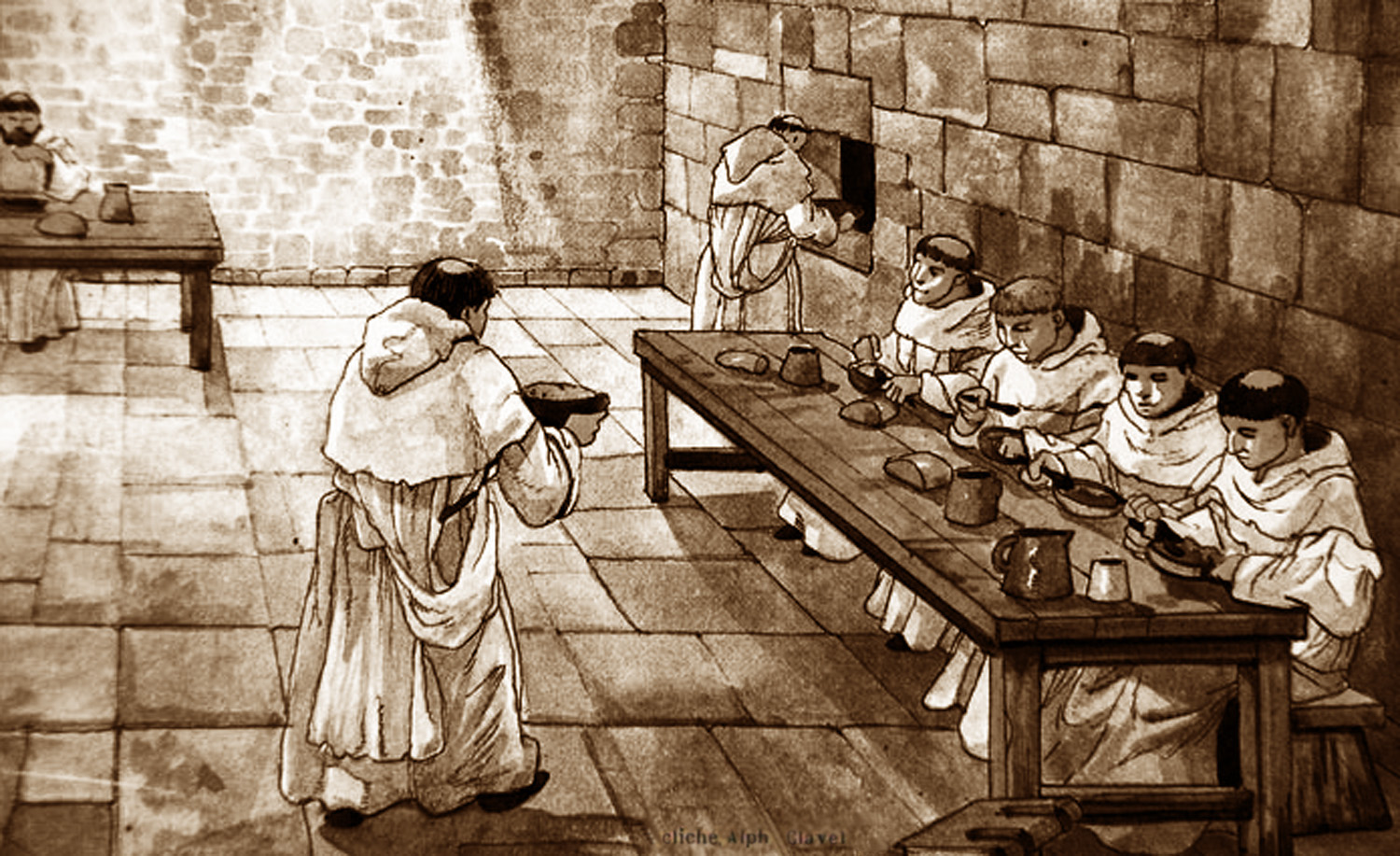
Monastic wine in Roncesvalles

===== Middle Ages =====
In the 13th century, Augustinian monks from the Roncesvalles Monastery established a vineyard in the Aldudes Valley, with Irouléguy serving as its administrative center. (Note: This AOC is located on the hills surrounding Irouléguy in the Pyrénées-Atlantiques department.) Given the mountainous terrain, vines were planted in terraces on the slopes near the Arradoy and Jara rivers. The vineyard's primary function was to provide wine for pilgrims traveling the Camino Francés to Santiago de Compostela.

===== Modern Era =====
Following the Treaty of the Pyrenees in the 17th century, the area was separated from Roncesvalles by a new international border. The monastery subsequently abandoned its vineyards, which were maintained by local inhabitants. At that time, vineyard coverage extended to approximately 500 hectares. The Viscount of Urdos played a role in promoting viticulture, encouraging cultivation on steep terrain.

During the 18th century, growing domestic demand contributed to increased wine production, particularly for vin de pays. However, in the 19th and early 20th centuries, production declined, and phylloxera severely affected the vineyards in 1912.

===== Contemporary period =====
In 1952, a cooperative was formed under the initiative of Alexandre Bergouignan to support growers and seek official recognition. Wines from Baigorri, Anhauze, and Irouléguy were granted AO VDQS (Vin Délimité de Qualité Supérieure) status in 1953, and the Irouléguy vineyard was awarded AOC designation in October 1970. (Note: The vineyard covered 183 hectares and produced 4,000 hectoliters.)

By the 1980s, vineyard area had decreased to roughly 70 hectares. A decline in cheese production prompted renewed interest in viticulture, and approximately 15 producers replanted around 150 hectares, including 110 hectares on terraced slopes, locally known as "Swiss terraces."

==== Grape varieties and production ====
Red wines are typically produced from Tannat, Cabernet Franc, and Cabernet Sauvignon, and are characterized by pronounced tannins. White wines are made from traditional southwestern grape varieties, including Courbu Blanc, Petit Manseng, and Gros Manseng. Yield limits are set at 50 hectoliters per hectare for red and rosé wines, and 55 hectoliters per hectare for white wines. Harvesting is carried out manually.

Annual production is approximately 5,500 hectoliters, consisting of 70% red, 20% rosé, and 10% white wines.

=== The Rioja D.O.C. ===
D.O.C. Rioja is located in four provinces of Spain

The Rioja Denominación de Origen Calificada (D.O.Ca.) is one of Spain's most recognized wine regions, primarily known for red wine production. While most vineyards are located within the autonomous community of La Rioja, the appellation also includes parts of the Basque province of Álava (Rioja Alavesa) and the autonomous community of Navarre. (Note: Rioja wines were awarded D.O.C. (Denominación de Origen Calificada) status in 1991.) The D.O.Ca. classification denotes compliance with stringent quality standards and represents the highest level of wine classification in Spain.

The Rioja region covers approximately 57,000 hectares and produces an average of 2.5 million hectoliters of wine annually. Red wine accounts for approximately 85% of total production.

==== History of Rioja vineyards ====
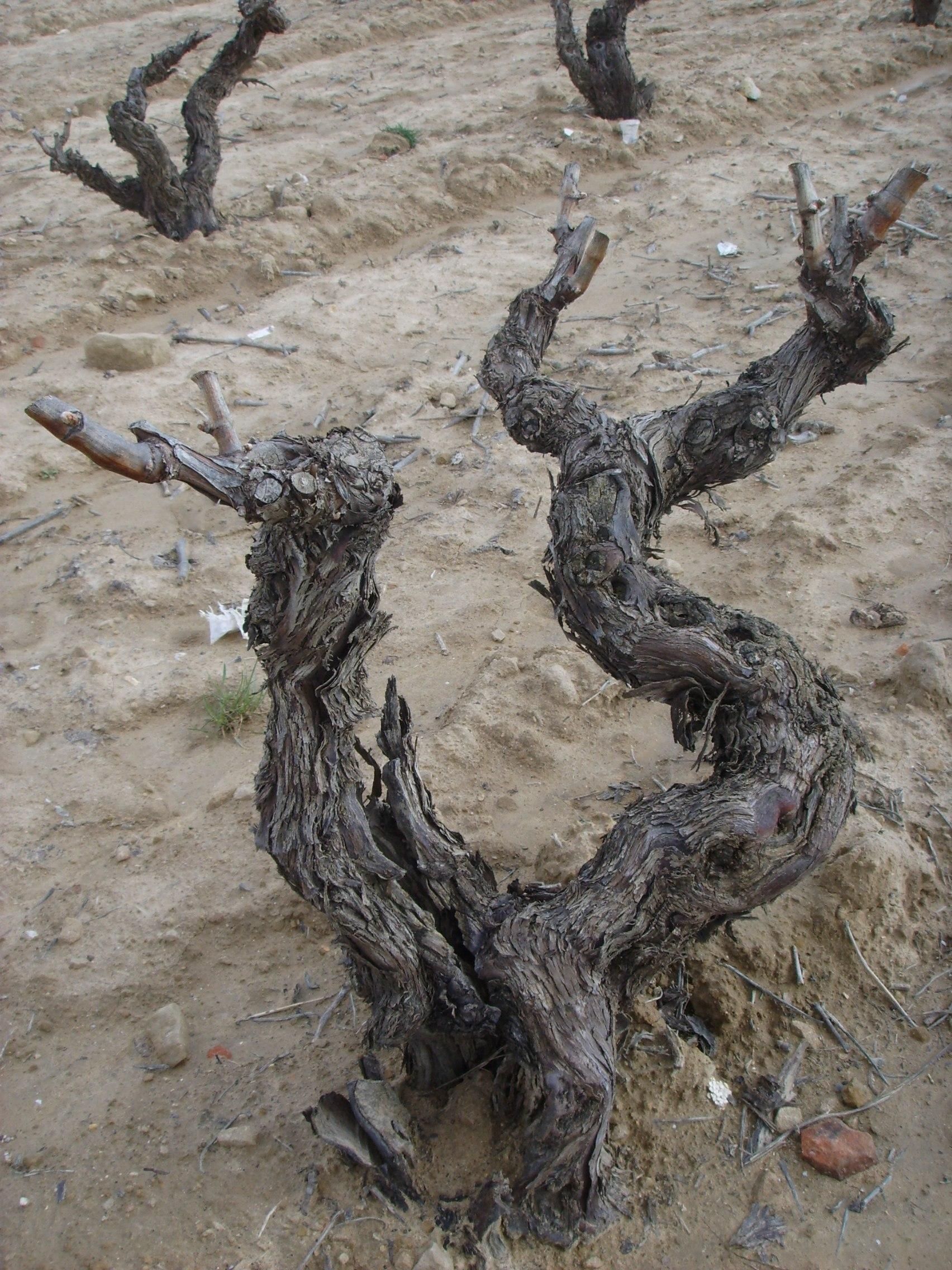
Typical vine stock in Elciego

===== Antiquity and the Middle Ages =====
Viticulture in the Rioja region dates back to antiquity, with early influences attributed to the Phoenicians and Celtiberians. The earliest written record referencing viticulture in the area appears in a document from 873, held by the notary of San Millán de la Cogolla. This record, involving a land donation to the Monastery of San Andrés de Trepeana, also represents one of the earliest examples of written Castilian. Monastic communities played a significant role in viticultural development during the medieval period.

In 1063, the Carta de población de Longares (Charter of Settlement of Longares) included a reference to vineyards. The first official recognition of Rioja wines occurred in 1102 under King Peter I of Aragon. The 13th-century Castilian poet Gonzalo de Berceo, associated with the San Millán de la Cogolla monastery, referenced wine in several of his literary works.

===== Renaissance =====
By 1560, grape growers in Longares adopted a distinctive mark to certify the origin and quality of their wines. Additional regulations followed, including a 1635 edict by the mayor of Logroño banning cart traffic near wine cellars to prevent damage from vibrations. In 1650, the first known legal text aimed at protecting the quality of Rioja wine was drafted.

===== The modern period =====
In 1790, the Real Sociedad Económica de Cosecheros de Rioja (Royal Economic Society of Rioja Winegrowers) convened its first meeting. The society addressed issues related to infrastructure for wine transport and was supported by 52 municipalities in the region. In 1852, Luciano Murrieta began producing wine in the Duque de la Victoria estate after studying winemaking techniques in Bordeaux, introducing modern oenological practices to the region.

===== Contemporary period =====
In 1892, quality control sections for viticulture and oenology had been established at the Haro railway station. A royal decree issued in 1902 provided the first formal definition of Rioja wine origin.

The Consejo Regulador (Regulatory Council) was established in 1926[8] to define production areas, monitor quality, and regulate the use of the Rioja name. It was granted formal legal status in 1945 and officially inaugurated in 1953.

In 1970, official regulations governing the Denominación de Origen and the Regulatory Council were approved. In 1991, Rioja became the first wine region in Spain to receive the Denominación de Origen Calificada (D.O.Ca.) status.

In 2008, the Regulatory Council adopted a new logo for Rioja wine bottles, featuring a Tempranillo grape symbol designed to represent the region’s viticultural heritage and ongoing innovation.

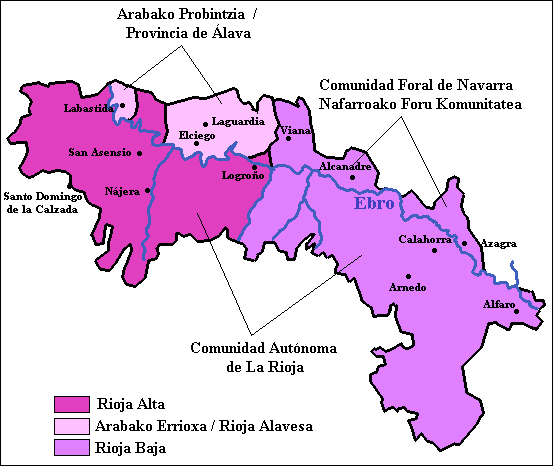
The three production sub-zones

==== Territorial division ====
Based on topographical and climatic variation, Rioja is divided into three wine-producing sub-zones with distinct characteristics: Errioxa Beherea (Rioja Baja), Arabako Errioxa (Rioja Alavesa), and Errioxa Garaia (Rioja Alta), with the latter located exclusively within the Rioja region.

===== Arabako Errioxa / Rioja Alavesa =====
Rioja Alavesa (Arabako Errioxa in Basque) comprises approximately 12,000 hectares of vineyards, with an average annual wine production of around 400,000 hectoliters. Wine production in the region is regulated by the Consejo Regulador de la Denominación de Origen Calificada Rioja, and Rioja Alavesa wines have gained recognition both domestically and internationally.

The region's viticultural conditions are influenced by its clay-limestone soils, which retain moisture efficiently, and by its geographic position just south of the Sierra Cantabria range. This location provides shelter from cold northerly winds and contributes to a favorable microclimate by promoting heat retention during the growing season.

Approximately 79% of the region's wine is produced from the Tempranillo grape variety, (Note: Its name means "early ripening.") known for its balanced alcohol-acidity profile and good color extraction. Additional grape varieties cultivated in Rioja Alavesa include Viura (also known as Macabeu), Grenache Noir (originating from Aragon), Mazuelo (also called Carignan), Graciano (noted for its aromatic intensity and used primarily in blends), Grenache Blanc, and Malvasia.

Rioja Alavesa wines are typically characterized by a bright color, aromas of dried fruit, and a fruit-forward palate. They generally exhibit moderate to high alcohol content, firm tannins, and a well-balanced structure. Typical alcohol content ranges from 11% to 13%. The most common wine style produced in the region is tinto, or red wine.

Young red wines (vino joven) are often produced using the traditional method of carbonic maceration, wherein whole grape clusters ferment in a carbon dioxide-rich environment for seven to ten days. After fermentation, the must is separated from the skins and transferred to tanks for completion. This process yields wines with fresh, fruity characteristics and minimal tannins.

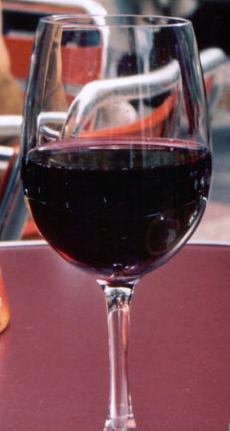
A Tinto Rioja

Control Committee on the Designation of Origin of Rioja (Annual Report 2007)
Alavese Municipalities	Red Wine (ha)	White Wine (ha)	Wineries
Baños de Ebro-Mañueta	450.19	59.42	24
Barriobusto	229.57	34.02	1
Kripan	139.00	10.75	2
Elciego	1082.70	56.72	21
Elvillar-Bilar	750.15	66.25	13
Labastida	1001.72	77.83	12
Labraza	122.64	16.76	0
Laguardia	3313.61	248.69	61
Lanciego	1005.64	98.48	17
Lapuebla de Labarca	310.57	28.78	40
Leza	345.44	31.50	6
Moreda de Álava	277.63	33.79	2
Navaridas	563.43	53.11	11
Oyón-Oion	790.97	47.14	7
Buradon Gatzaga (Note: It is part of the municipality of Labastida.)	56.69	3.91	0
Samaniego	483.49	49.01	14
Villabuena de Álava-Eskuernaga	490.92	54.10	42
Yécora-Iekora	449.86	26.04	5
Total in Álava	11,864.22	996.30	280

Aging classifications in Rioja Alavesa follow the broader Rioja D.O.Ca. standards:

- Crianza: Minimum aging of two years, with at least one year in oak barrels and the remainder in the bottle.
- Reserva: Minimum aging of three years, including at least one year in oak and two in the bottle.
- Gran Reserva: Aged for at least five years, with a minimum of two years in oak barrels and three years in the bottle.

The town of. Laguardia serves as a key center for wine production in Rioja Alavesa and is home to 53 of the 278 wineries registered within the broader Rioja appellation.

Table of the quality of Rioja Alavesa wines
Year	0	1	2	3	4	5	6	7	8	9
1960	Good	Good	Very Good	Normal	Excellent	Average	Normal	Normal	Very Good	Normal
1970	Very Good	Average	Average	Good	Good	Very Good	Good	Normal	Very Good	Normal
1980	Good	Very Good	Excellent	Good	Normal	Good	Good	Very Good	Good	Good
1990	Good	Very Good	Good	Good	Excellent	Excellent	Very Good	Good	Very Good	Good
2000	Good	Excellent	Good	Good	Excellent	Excellent	Very Good	Very Good		

===== Rioja Baja / Errioxa Beherea =====
Rioja Baja (Errioxa Beherea in Basque), also known as Rioja Oriental, encompasses approximately 20,907 hectares of vineyards. Of this area, around 6,785 hectares are located within the autonomous community of Navarre. The sub-region comprises eight municipalities and fifteen vineyards, all situated in an area influenced by a Mediterranean climate.

Navarrese Municipalities	Red Wine (ha)	White Wine (ha)	Wineries
Andosilla	882.54	24.57	5
Aras	74.43	2.05	1
Azagra	1377.00	23.33	2
Bargota	361.25	13.54	1
Viana	1443.59	99.49	3
Mendavia	1510.44	18.41	2
San Adrián	532.85	20.19	1
Sartaguda	29.82	0.37	0
Total in Navarre	6,211.92	201.95	15

==== Culture ====
As in many Spanish wine-producing regions, wine plays a significant role in the cultural and culinary traditions of the area.

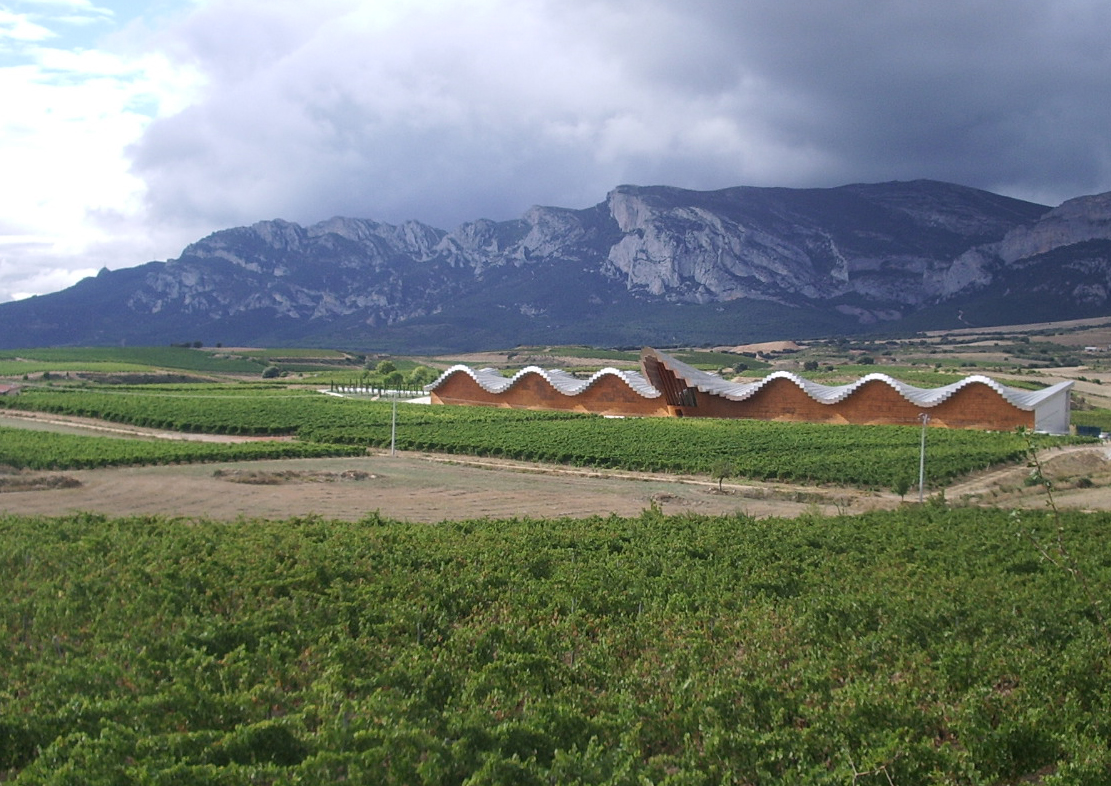
Ysios upategia created by architect Santiago Calatrava in Laguardia.

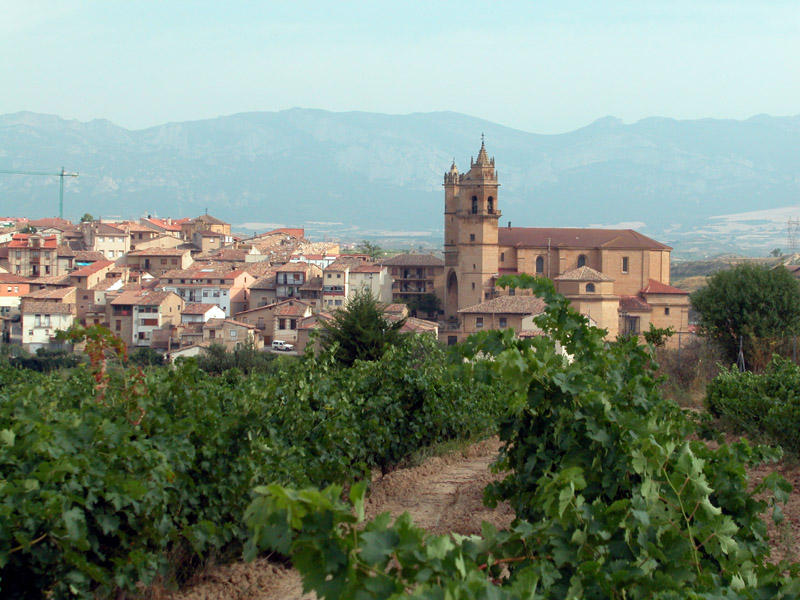
Panoramic view of Elciego from a row of vines.

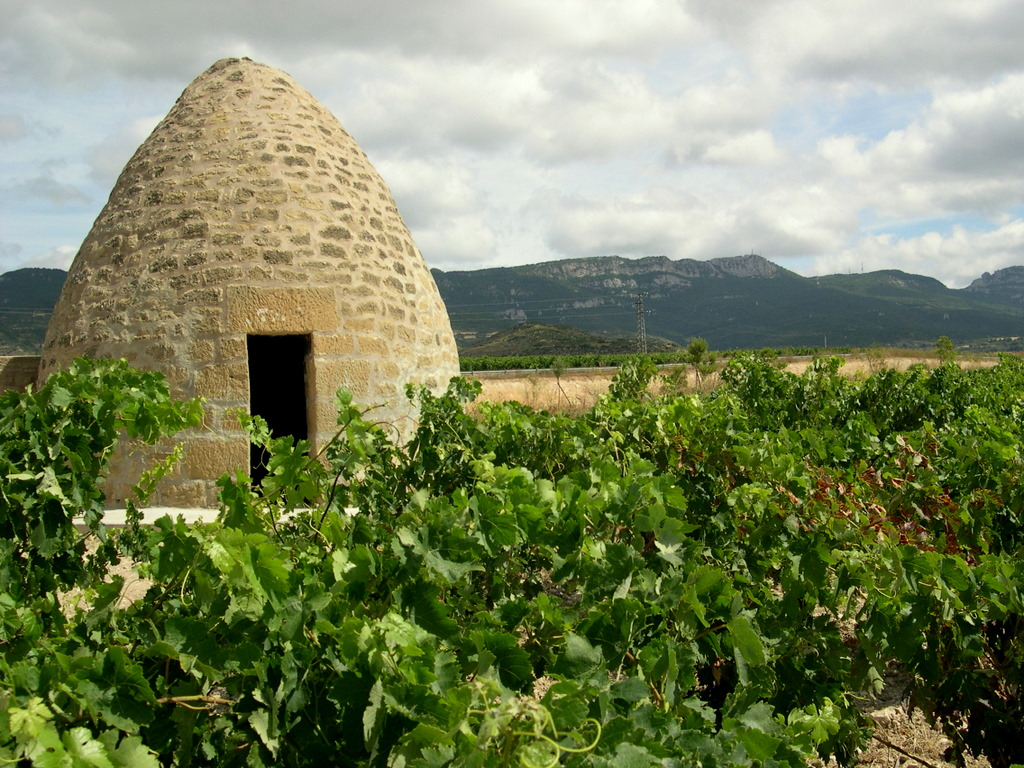
Cone-shaped shelter in Laguardia for farmers in case of storms.

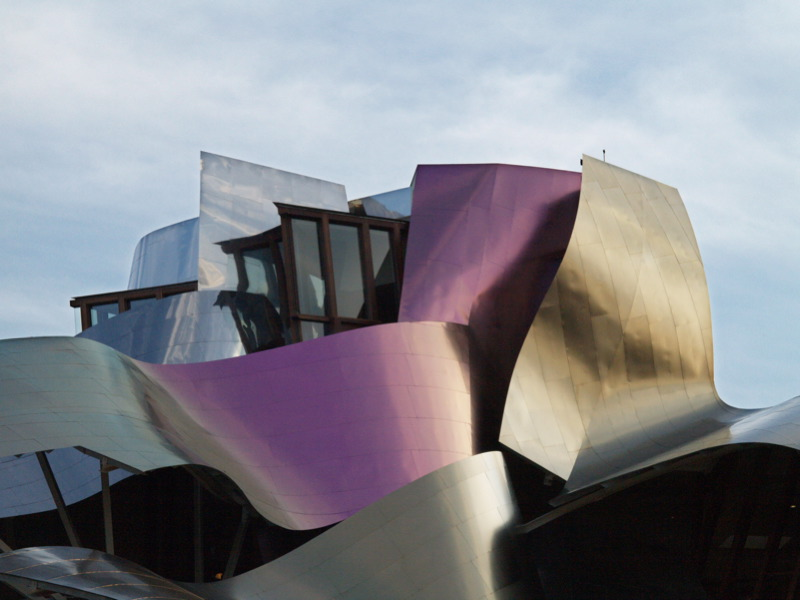
Bodega Marques de Riscal designed by architect Frank Gehry in Elciego.

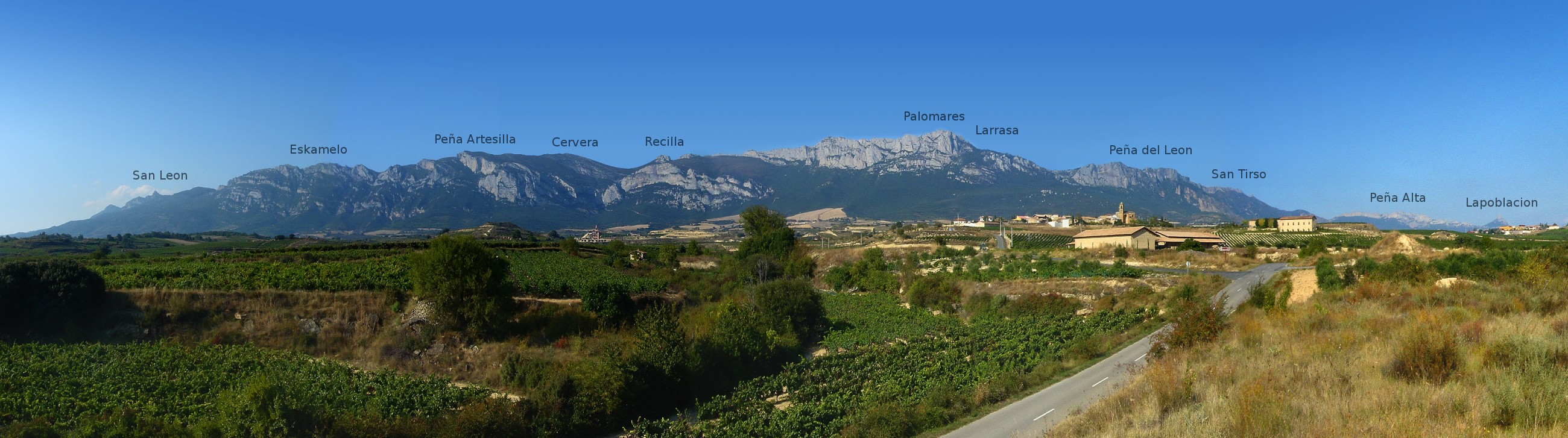
Panoramic view of Rioja Alavesa with the Toloño mountains in the background

=== Txakoli ===
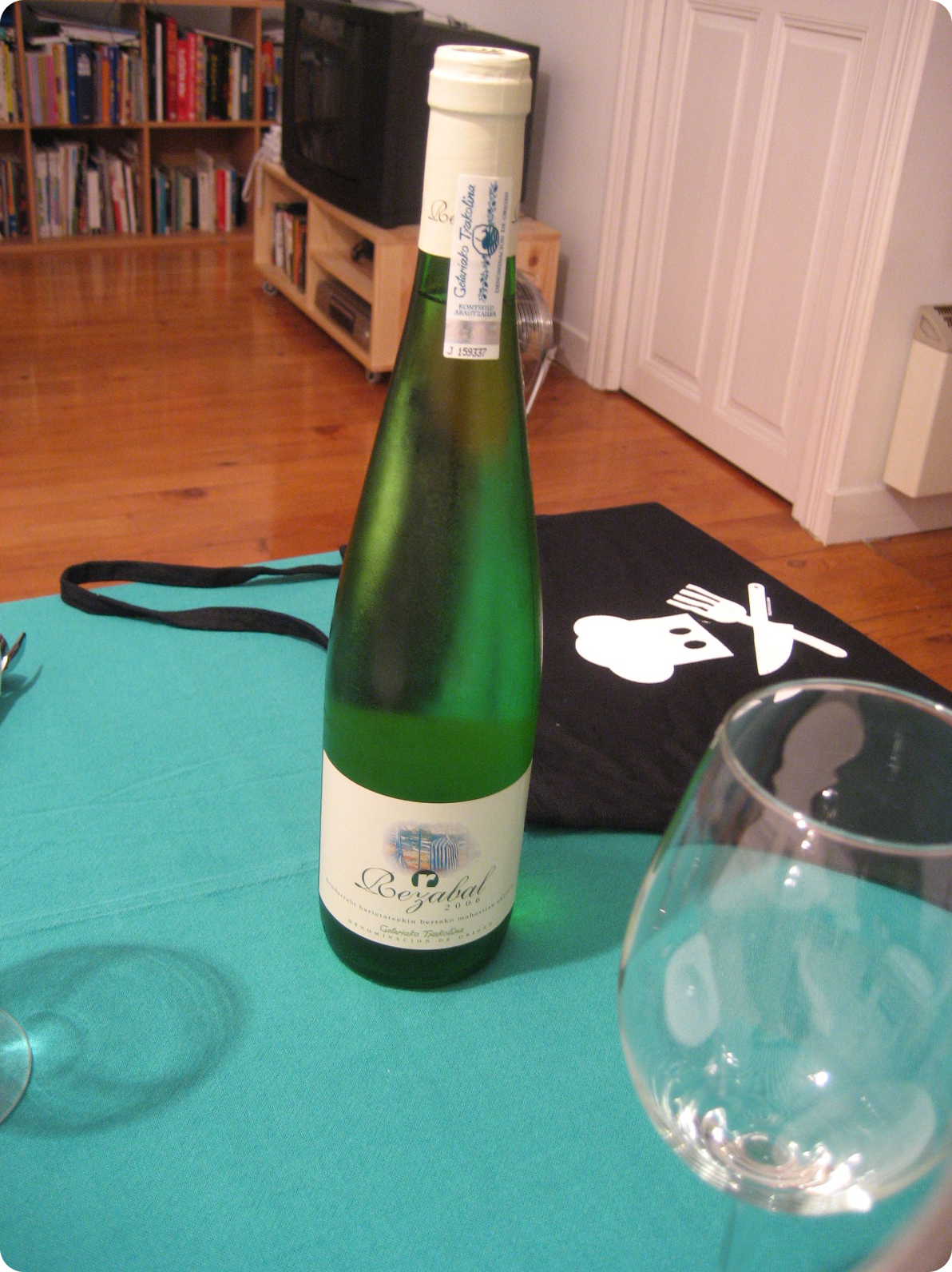
Bottle of txakoli

Txakoli (also txakolina in Basque; chacolí in Spanish) is a white wine known for its slight effervescence, high acidity, and relatively low alcohol content, typically ranging from 9.5% to 11.5% ABV. It is produced across all three provinces of the Autonomous Community of the Basque Country.

Txakoli is traditionally consumed young, within the year of bottling, as it is not intended for aging. While the most common style is a pale greenish-white, red and rosé variants are also produced. It is typically served in tall-stemmed glasses and often accompanies pintxos, small snacks commonly found in Basque cuisine.

Historically, txakoli was aged in large oak vessels (foudres), but modern production methods generally employ stainless steel tanks.

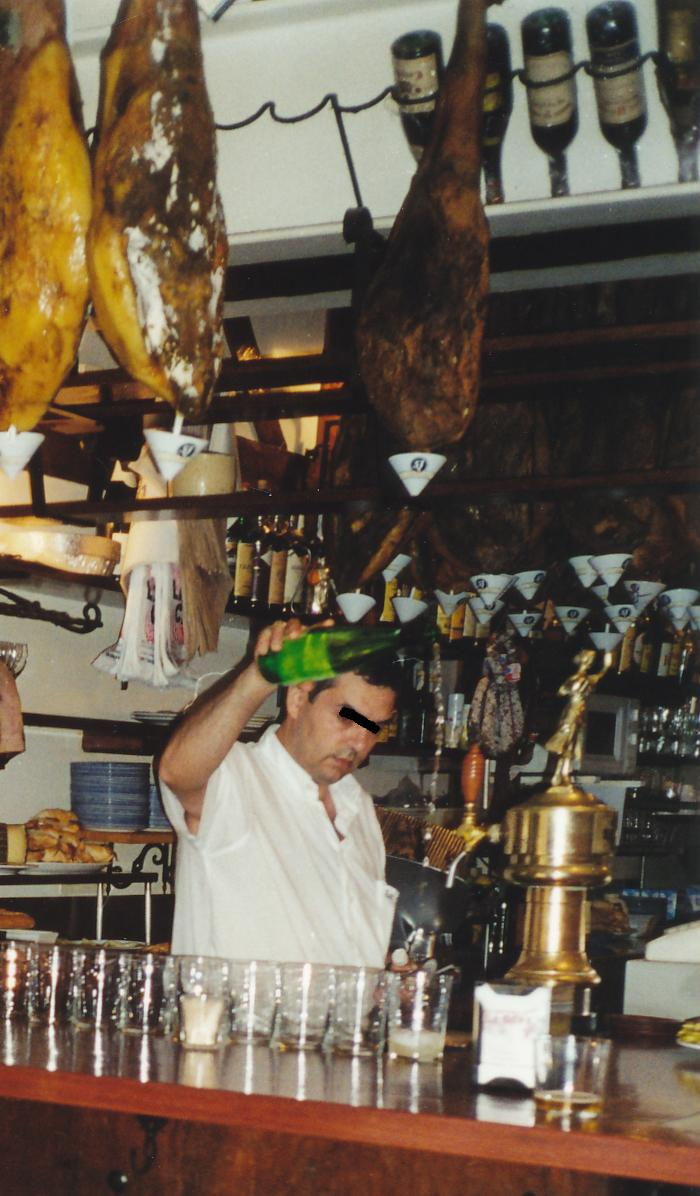
Txakoli served Basque style

Most vineyards are located near the Bay of Biscay, where the climate is characterized by high annual precipitation (1,000–1,600 mm) and moderate temperatures (7.5–18.7 °C). Occasional frost can affect vine health despite otherwise favorable conditions.

A museum dedicated to txakoli—the Museo del Txakoli – Txakolinaren Museoa—is located in the 18th-century Mendibile Palace in Leioa, near Bilbao. The museum presents the history of txakoli and exhibits traditional winemaking tools.

==== Etymology ====
The term txakoli or txakolina (pronounced [tʃakoˈliɲa]) is of Basque origin. The suffix -in, often found in words for liquids such as ozpin ("vinegar"), suggests a longstanding usage in the language. However, the root of the term remains uncertain. Linguist Resurrección María Azkue proposed that the origin of the word is unclear, despite its widespread historical use.

In Spanish, the wine is referred to as chacolí, though the Basque form is more commonly used on labels and in marketing, particularly within the Basque Country. Examples include Txakoli de Bizkaia (Spanish: Chacolí de Vizcaya) and Txakoli de Getaria (Spanish: Chacolí de Guetaria).

==== History of Txakoli vineyards ====
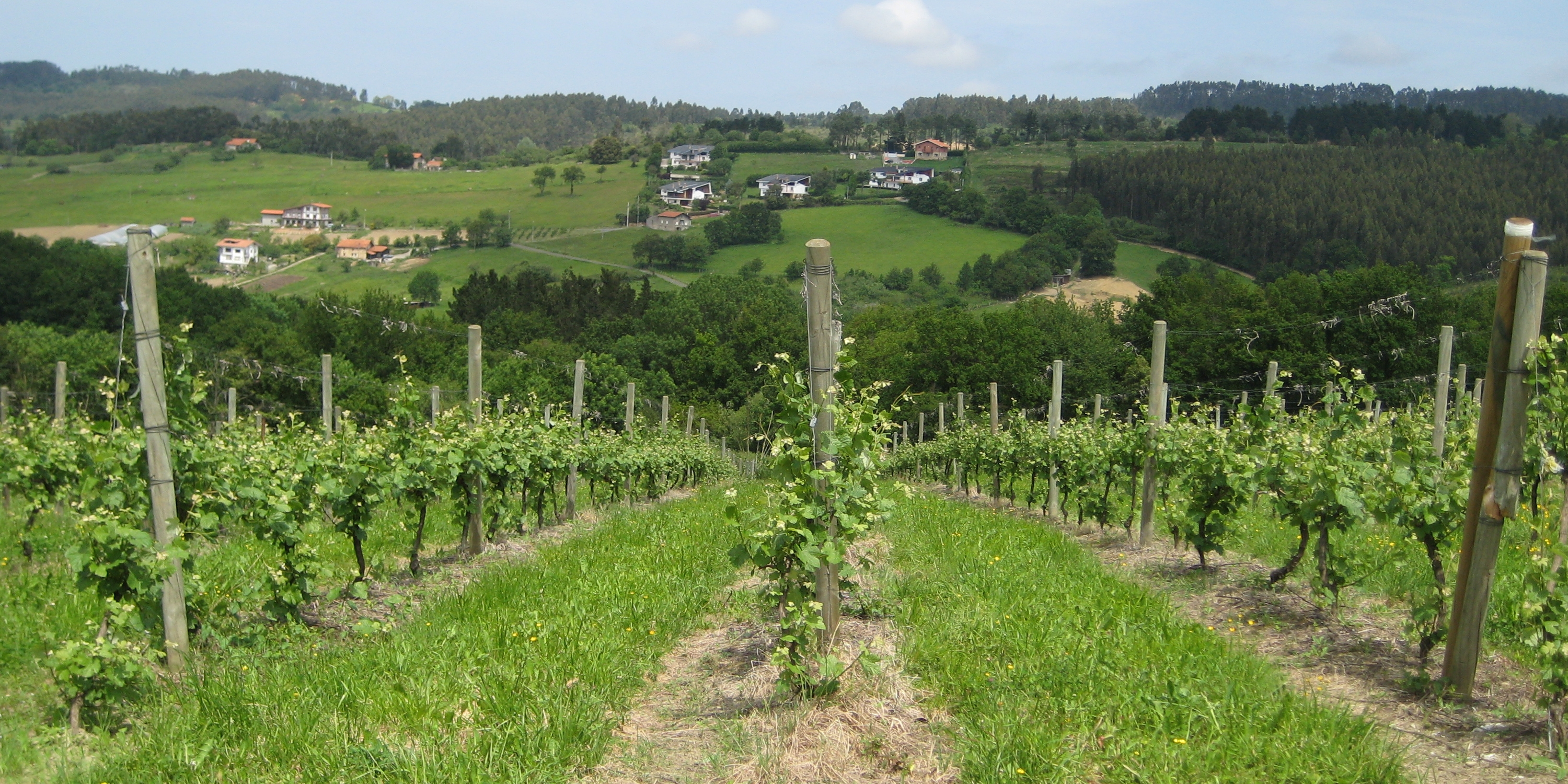
Vineyards near Erandio

===== Modern times =====
By the mid-19th century, txakoli production had declined significantly and was largely limited to domestic consumption within the Basque Country. This trend continued until the 1980s, during which txakoli was typically produced by private individuals for local use.

===== Contemporary period =====
In 1994, select txakoli vintages began receiving Denominación de Origen (DO) certification. Subsequent improvements in viticulture and production standards contributed to an increase in demand and wider distribution. Establishments known as txakolindegi, dedicated to txakoli production and tasting, became more common and are now widespread throughout the region, with a role similar to that of Sagardotegi (cider houses).

==== The different Txakoli ====
There are three officially recognized txakoli-producing regions, each with Denominación de Origen (DO) status:

- D.O. Getariako Txakolina: Produced around the town of Getaria in the province of Guipuscoa; granted DO status in 1990.
- D.O. Bizkaiako Txakolina: Produced along the coast of Biscay (Vizcaya); granted DO status in 1994.
- D.O. Arabako Txakolina: Produced in the province of Alava, particularly around the town of Amurrio; granted DO status in 2001.

===== Chacolí de Getaria =====
Getariako Txakolina (Spanish: Chacolí de Getaria) is produced in a limited area of Guipuscoa, including the municipalities of Getaria, Zarautz, and Aia. It was the first txakoli to receive DO certification, in 1989. Cultivated vineyard area has expanded from 60 hectares to 177 hectares, with an average annual production of approximately 9,000 hectoliters. Vineyards are commonly located on southeast-facing slopes to shield them from Atlantic weather systems.

The traditional parra system is used for vine training, in which vines are elevated on trellises, forming a canopy that improves air circulation and promotes ripening. This method is similar to systems used in Portuguese vinhos verdes production.

Authorized white grape varieties include Hondarribi Zuri (Courbu), Hondarribi Zuri Zerratia (Petit Courbu), Izkiriota (Gros Manseng), as well as Riesling and Chardonnay. For red and rosé wines, the authorized grape is Hondarribi Beltza.

Production has expanded to other municipalities in Gipuzkoa, including Orio, Zumaia, Arrasate, Eibar, Mutriku, Deba, Zestoa, Fontarrabie, Villabona, Urnieta, Oñati, Beizama, Zerain, and Olaberria.

===== Chacolí de Álava =====
Arabako Txakolina (Spanish: Chacolí de Álava) is produced in the northwest of Álava. It received DO status in 2001. The wine is typically pale yellow, with high acidity and slight effervescence. Vineyards cover approximately 55 hectares, primarily around Aiara, Amurrio, Artziniega, Laudio, and Okondo. Historical evidence of viticulture in this area dates back to at least 760 CE.

Authorized grape varieties include Hondarribi Zuri (White Hondarribi), Bordeleza Zuria (Folle Blanche), Izkiriota Ttipia (Petit Manseng), Izkiriota (Gros Manseng), and Courbu.

===== Chacolí de Vizcaya =====
Bizkaiko Txakolina (Spanish: Chacolí de Vizcaya) is produced throughout most of Biscay, excluding the western comarca of Enkarterri. (Note: In the comarca of Enkarterri, the municipalities of Zalla and Balmaseda are the only ones among the seventeen to produce txaloli.) (Note: List of counties and municipalities: Enkarterri: Zalla and Balmaseda, Txorierri: Lezama and Zamudio, Durangaldea, Mungialdea and Lea-Artibai.)

Vineyards extend across approximately 150 hectares in 85 municipalities, with annual production around 7,000 hectoliters. Historical records suggest viticulture in the region dates back to the 8th century.

Authorized grape varieties include Hondarribi Beltza, Hondarribi Zuri, Ondarrabi Zuri Zerratia (Petit Courbu), Mune Mahatsa (Folle Blanche), Izkiriota (Gros Manseng), Izkiriota Ttipia (Petit Manseng), Sauvignon Blanc, Riesling, and Chardonnay.

===== Txakoli outside the Basque Country =====
Historically, txakoli was produced in several municipalities outside the Basque Autonomous Community, particularly in the Trasmiera region of Cantabrian. Production in these areas declined significantly in the late 19th century but has continued on a small scale in Cantabria into the present day. In addition, txakoli is currently produced in the Valle de Mena, located in the province of Burgos, where efforts are underway to obtain Denominación de Origen (DO) certification for locally produced wines.

Wine Sector in the Autonomous Community of the Basque Country
Txakoli	Area (ha)	Producers	Warehouses	Volume (hl)
Arabako Txakolina	60	13	1	2400
Bizkaiko Txakolina	255	254	73	9585.71
Getariako Txakolina	180 •	40	17	10000 •

• Getariako Txakolina is expected to reach 30,000 hectoliters annually with the inclusion of vineyards from Hondarribia, Oñati, Arrasate, and Zumaia. The total vineyard area will expand to 300 hectares, increasing production by one million liters per year.

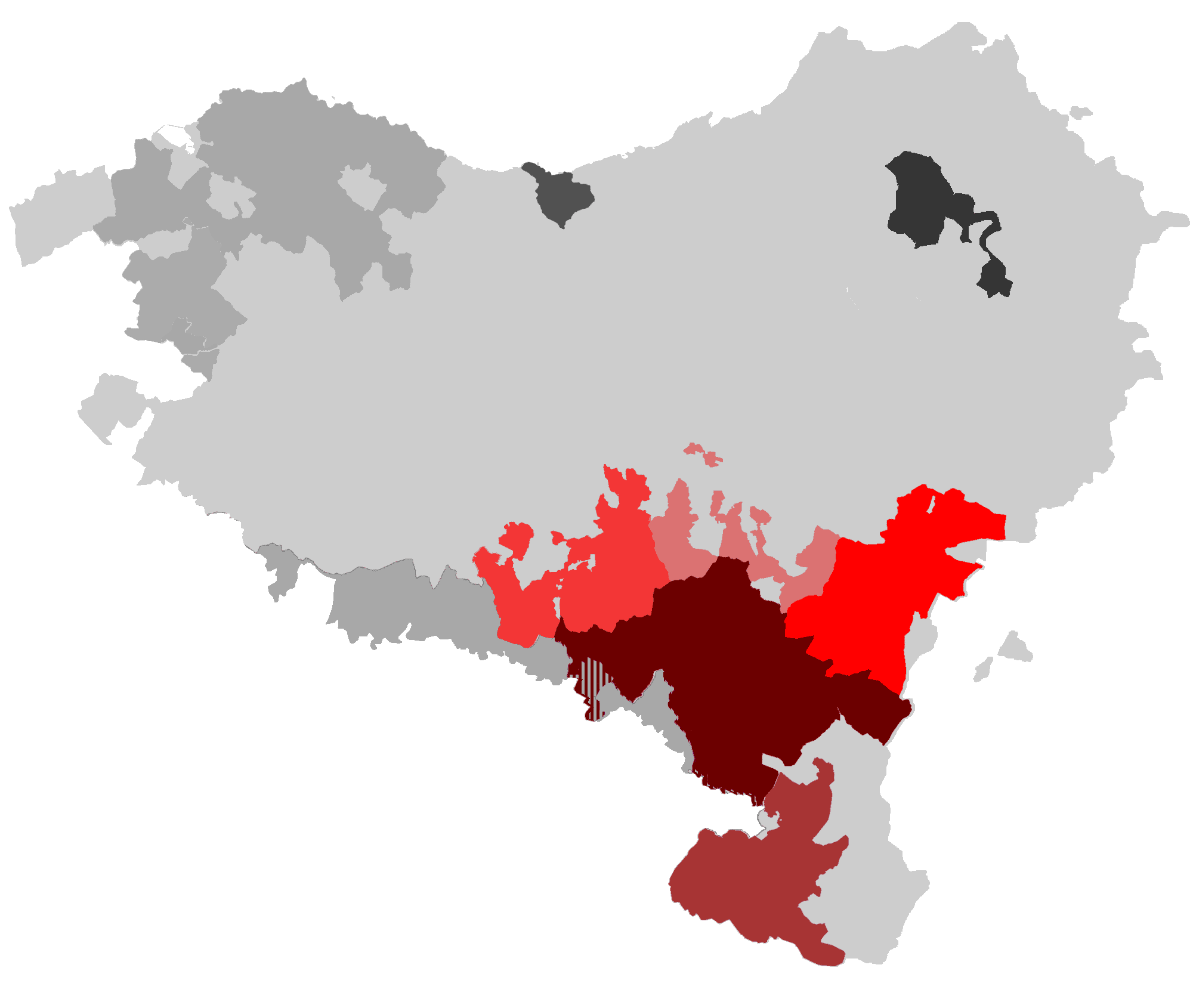
Map of the five different terroirs of the D.O. Navarra Behe Erribera or Ribera Baja Goi Erribera or Ribera Alta Lizarraldea or Tierra Estella Izarbeibarra or Valdizarbe Behe Mendialdea or Baja Montaña

=== The D.O. Navarra ===
The Denominación de Origen Navarra encompasses the production of red, rosé, and white wines in the southern part of the Comunidad Foral de Navarra, covering an area of approximately 18,841 hectares.

A small section of southwestern Navarre (around 5%) also falls within the Rioja D.O.Ca. designation zone.

The D.O. Navarra is divided into five sub-regions, each characterized by distinct geographical and climatic features.

D.O of Navarre versus D.O.C. Rioja

==== Behe Erribera or Ribera Baja ====
Ribera Baja, located in the southernmost part of Navarre, is the largest of the five sub-regions by vineyard area, covering approximately 5,666 hectares. It also contains the highest number of wineries and records an average yield of 74.05 quintals per hectare. The climate is predominantly Mediterranean, with average annual rainfall of 448 mm and about 241 days of sunshine.

The soil is generally brownish-gray, with a limestone substratum on the plains and alluvial deposits near the rivers. Ribera Baja accounts for approximately 40.29% of total D.O. Navarra wine production. (Note: List of municipalities: Ablitas, Arguedas, Barillas, Cascante, Castejón, Cintruénigo, Corella, Fitero, Monteagudo, Murchante, Tudela, Tulebras and Valtierra.)

==== Goi Erribera or Ribera Alta ====
Situated along the Ebro Valley, Ribera Alta spans around 5,944 hectares. Average yields reach 63.61 quintals per hectare, and the region receives 444–513 mm of rainfall annually, along with 238–245 days of sunshine.

The sub-region includes twenty-six municipalities and features a dry climate. (Note: List of municipalities: Artajona, Beire, Berbinzana, Cadreita, Caparroso, Cárcar, Carcastillo, Falces, Funes, Larraga, Lerín, Lodosa, Marcilla, Mélida, Miracle, Miranda de Arga, Murillo el Cuende, Murillo el Fruto, Olite, Peralta, Pitillas, Sansoáin, Santacara, Sesma, Tafalla et Villafranca.) The dominant soil types are limestone marl and alluvial sediment. Ribera Alta contributes approximately 22.90% of total D.O. Navarra wine production.

==== Izarbeibar or Valdizarde ====
Valdizarbe is located between the Arga and Cidacos rivers and includes parts of the Puente la Reina comarca. The area covers 1,275 hectares, with an average yield of 59.19 quintals per hectare. The region receives about 593 mm of rainfall annually and benefits from around 218 sunny days.

Comprising twenty-five municipalities, Valdizarbe has a relatively dry climate and represents around 11% of total D.O. Navarra production. (Note: List of towns: Adiós, Añorbe, Artazu, Barásoain, Biurrun-Olcoz, Cirauqui, Echauri, Enériz, Garínoain, Guirguillano, Legarda, Leoz, Mañeru, Mendigorría, Muruzábal, Obanos, Olóriz, Orísoain, Pueyo, Puente la Reina, Tiebas-Muruarte de Reta, Tirapu, Úcar, Unzué, Uterga.)

==== Behe Mendialdea or Baja Montaña ====
This eastern sub-region lies within the Aragon River valley. It encompasses 2,655 hectares and has an average yield of 52.98 quintals per hectare. Rainfall averages around 683 mm annually, with approximately 232 days of sunshine. The area includes twenty-two municipalities and is marked by dry conditions and chalky soils, typically yellowish or reddish in hue. Baja Montaña contributes approximately 14.79% of total D.O. Navarra wine output. (Note: List of municipalities: Aibar, Cáseda, Eslava, Ezprogui, Gallipienzo, Javier, Leache, Lerga, Liédena, Lumbier, Sada, Sangüesa, San Martín de Unx et Ujué.)

==== Lizarraldea or Tierra de Estrella ====
Located in the valleys of the Odron, Ega, and Linares rivers, Lizarraldea contains 3,083 hectares of vineyards. The region's average yield is 58.94 quintals per hectare, with annual precipitation around 680 mm and about 232 days of sunshine. (Note: List of municipalities: Aberin, Allo, Arellano, Armañanzas, Arróniz, Ayegui, Barbarin, Dicastillo, Desojo, El Busto, Espronceda, Estella, Igúzquiza, Lazagurría, Los Arcos, Luquin, Mendaza, Morentin, Murieta, Oteiza, Sansol, Torralba del Río, Torres del Río, Yerri, Villamayor de Monjardín et Villatuerta.) With thirty-eight municipalities involved in wine production, Lizarraldea accounts for approximately 11% of the total output under the D.O. Navarra designation.

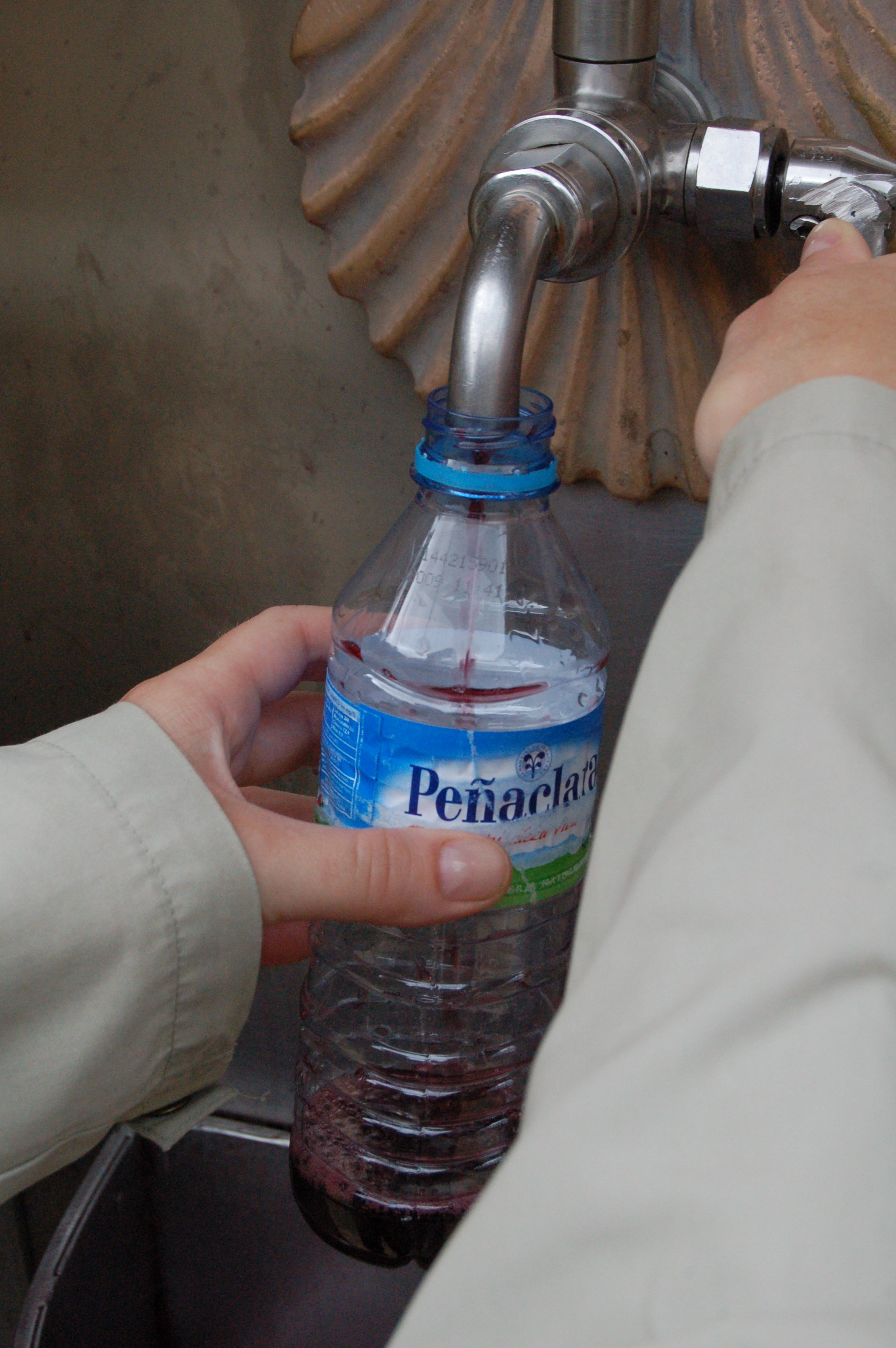
Free wine fountain at Bodegas Irache very close to the Santa Maria la Real monastery

==== History of Navarre vineyards ====
===== Prehistory =====
Evidence suggests that grapevines existed in Navarre during prehistoric times. Fossilized remains of Vitis species have been found in Tertiary geological formations in the Mediterranean basin. In northern Navarre, the presence of Vitis silvestris, a wild grape species, has been confirmed for the prehistoric period. These wild vines were primarily harvested for their roots and other non-fermentative uses, rather than for wine production.

===== Antiquity =====
The origins of winemaking in Navarre are traced to the 1st century BCE, based on archaeological discoveries of tools and facilities associated with viticulture. Evidence indicates that the cultivation of Vitis silvestris continued after the arrival of the Romans, who introduced advanced viticultural practices.

Archaeological finds from sites such as Funes, Arellano, Liédena, and Falces include amphorae, wine presses, and mosaics with Bacchic motifs, confirming industrial-scale wine production between the 1st and 5th centuries CE. Notable discoveries include wine amphorae in Cintruénigo and Cascante, dating from the 1st century BCE.

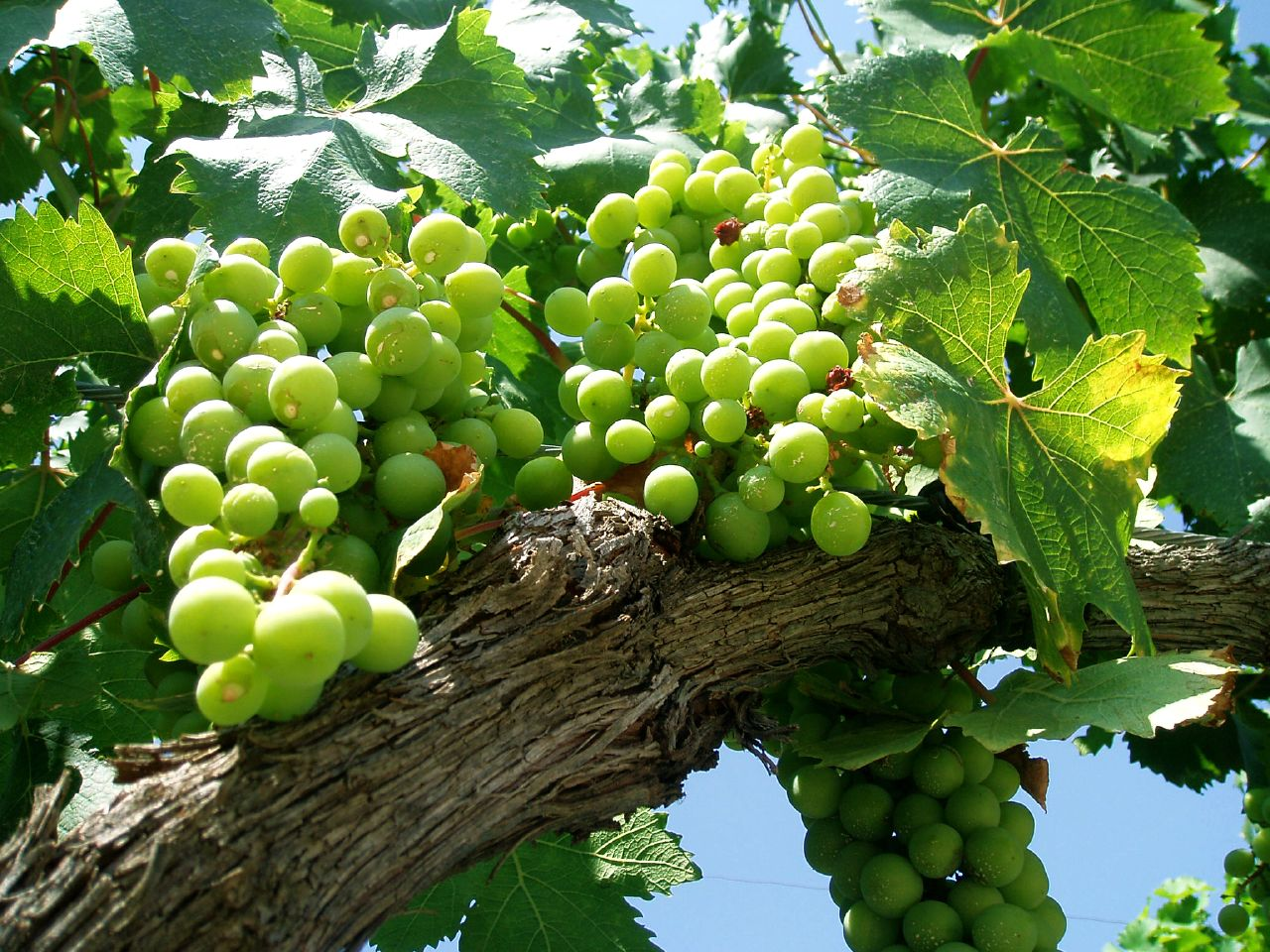
Bunch of grapes in Santacara

.

===== Middle Ages and Renaissance =====
During the High Middle Ages (5th to 12th centuries), Roman influence declined as the region underwent successive incursions by the Alans, Vandals, and Swabians. Agricultural systems were reorganized under Visigothic rule from 457 onward, incorporating elements of earlier Roman models while adapting to new social and landholding structures. Monastic institutions increasingly assumed control over viticulture.

Although Muslim and Jewish communities in Navarre contributed to agricultural activity, including viticulture, their involvement in winemaking was limited. Christian institutions—such as royal courts, monasteries, and establishments serving pilgrims along the Camino de Santiago—were the primary consumers of Navarrese wine.

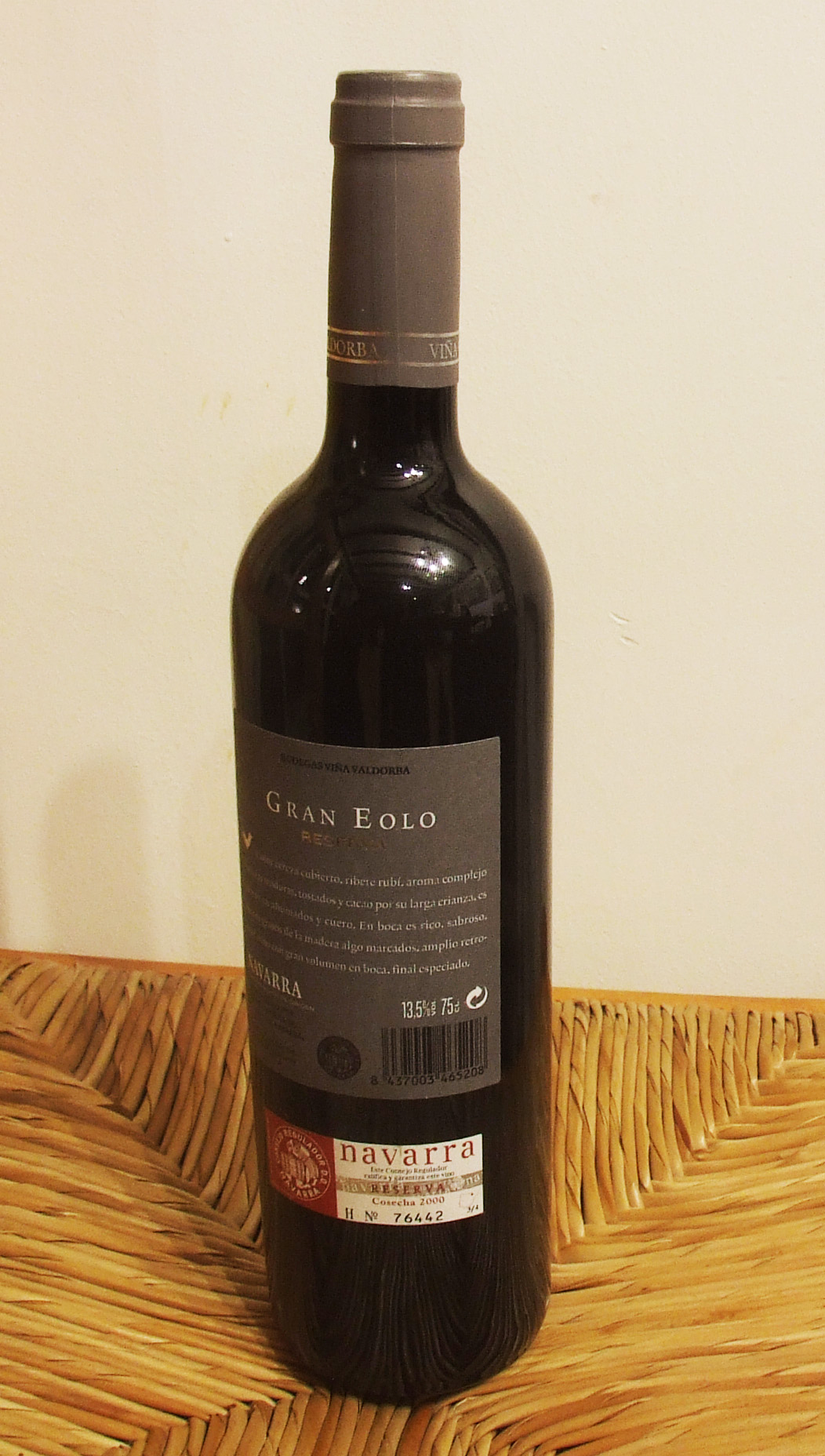
Reserve red wine from Navarre

From the 13th to 15th centuries, viticulture expanded along the Ebro River and into Pyrenean valleys. While much production remained localized, some villages—such as Anue, Ezcabarte, Ibilcieta, Arakil, and Urraul Alto—engaged in wine trade as a significant economic activity. The Monastery of Iratxe played a prominent role in wine production and agricultural education.

The Camino de Santiago, which crosses Navarre from east to west, facilitated the spread of viticulture. Vineyards were planted along its route, particularly near Pamplona and Viana, and wine was served in pilgrim hospitals and inns. Medieval travelogues often mention the quality of Navarrese wines.

The region’s wine culture is also reflected in folk songs, such as:

Auxen duk arno ona / Here's some good wine
Peraltakoa, Peraltakoa / Only Peralta's, Peralta's
San Antonek gorde dezala / May Saint Anthony protect
au karri duen mandoa, / the mule that brought it,
to the karri duen mandoa, / the mule that brought it.

===== Modern times =====
Viticulture in Navarre expanded significantly during the Renaissance and into the 18th century. This growth led to overproduction, prompting local authorities to impose restrictions on foreign wine imports and the planting of new vines. Navarre began exporting surplus wine to Castile and other European regions via the port of San Sebastian.

Pamplona became an important viticultural center, with many residents cultivating vineyards on the city’s outskirts. Municipal laws aimed to protect local producers by limiting imports from the Ribera region, whose wines were considered of higher quality. Wine was consumed both domestically and in public taverns and inns.

In the 19th century, commercial wine distribution increased. Viticulture expanded northward into areas such as La Barranca and the Pamplona basin. While only limited vine cultivation persists in these areas today, mid-century disease outbreaks in France (powdery mildew and phylloxera) briefly boosted demand for Navarrese wine.

This era saw significant investments in viticulture. Vineyard area grew to nearly 50,000 hectares, and many small wineries were expanded for industrial-scale production. Navarrese wines gained recognition at exhibitions in Bordeaux, Madrid, and Chicago.

However, the industry suffered setbacks. A rust outbreak in 1885[8] was followed by the arrival of phylloxera in 1892, which devastated vineyards. The cultivated area declined from nearly 50,000 hectares to only 700 hectares within a few years.

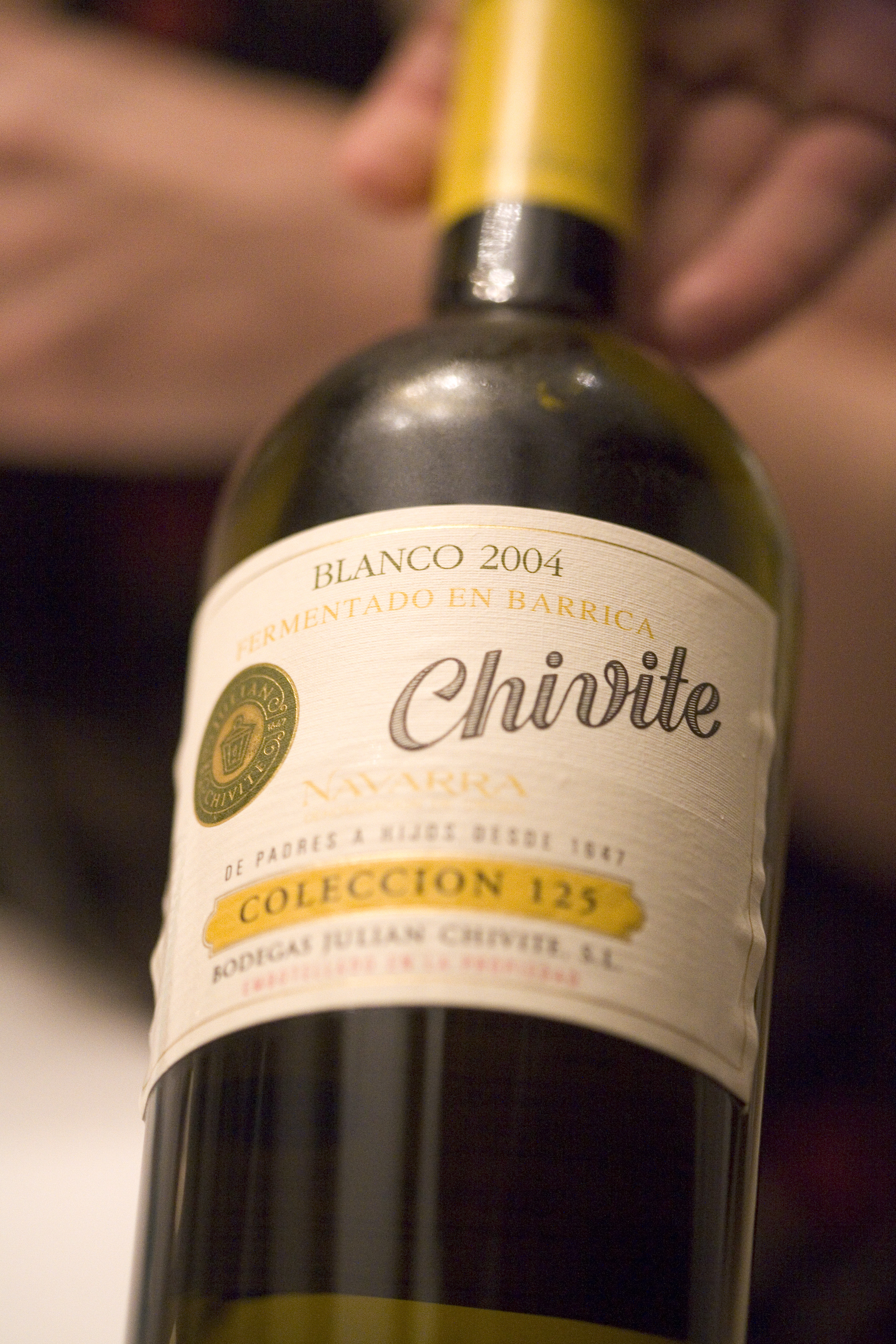
Special Chivite wine

===== Contemporary times =====
The early 20th century focused on vineyard recovery following the phylloxera crisis. The 1912 National Viticultural Congress held in Pamplona encouraged renewed efforts to restore viticulture. Support measures by the Autonomous Council and the formation of the Navarre Winegrowers’ Association furthered these efforts.

The agrarian cooperative movement, driven by figures such as priests Victoriano Flamarique and Antonio Yoldi, led to the establishment of rural credit institutions and cooperative wineries. The first, Bodega Cooperativa Olitense, was founded in Olite in 1911. After the Spanish Civil War, the number of cooperative wineries increased to approximately seventy.

A new phase began in 1980 with the establishment of EVENA (Estación de Viticultura y Enología de Navarra), which promoted modernization, including bottling practices and the use of oak barrels. The Navarra Denominación de Origen (D.O.), officially recognized in the 20th century, supports the region’s wine industry, which today produces red, rosé, white, and muscatel wines.

==== Types of grape ====
Navarre cultivates a variety of grapes adapted to its diverse winemaking traditions:

- Red wine: Cabernet Sauvignon, Syrah, Merlot, Tempranillo and Grenache, or Garnatxa in Basque.
- Rosé wine: Grenache
- White wine: Chardonnay

The overall distribution of grape varieties is approximately as follows: Grenache 70%, Tempranillo 12%, Macabeu 7%, Cabernet Sauvignon 3%, Merlot 2.5%, Carignan 2%, and Graciano 1%.

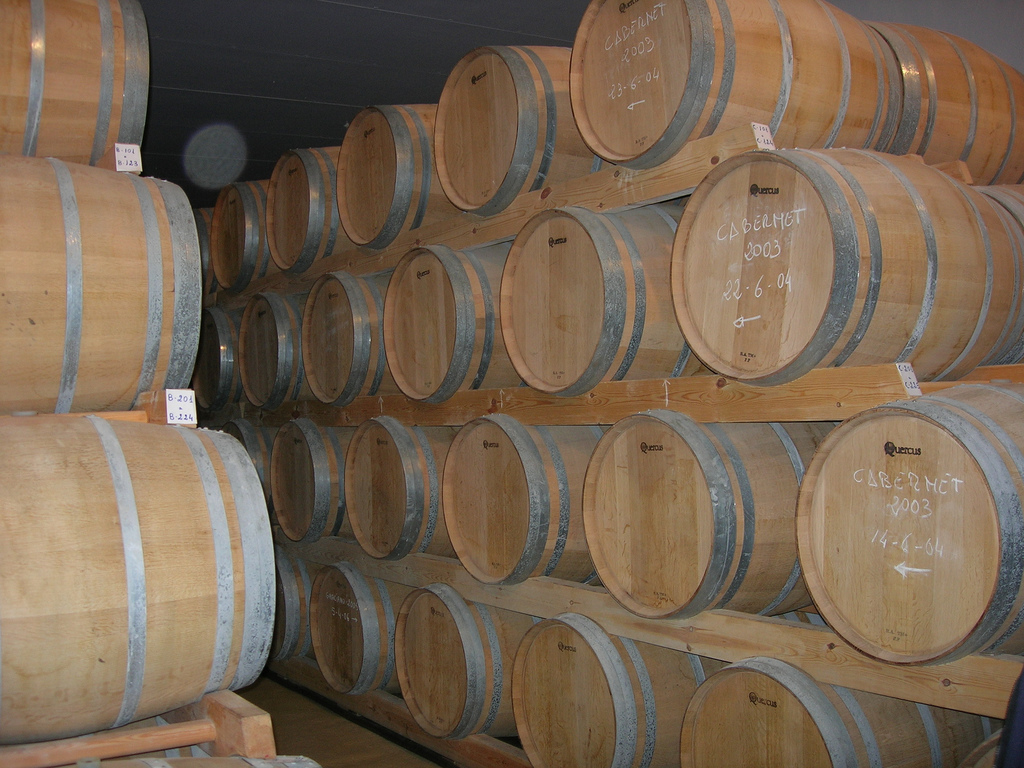
Bodegas Valdorba in the Orbaibar valley.

==== Production ====
Wine production according to the Navarra Denomination Council (Nafarroako Izendapenaren Kontseilua)
Year	Production (kg)	Quality	Year	Production (kg)	Quality
1985	93,802,186	Good	1995	69,172,608	Excellent
1986	71,998,186	Good	1996	95,031,176	Very good
1987	52,920,474	Good	1997	85,669,681	Good
1988	47,946,167	Very good	1998	79,481,524	Very good
1989	72,993,873	Very good	1999	72,334,047	Very good
1990	66,873,090	Good	2000	125,224,590	Very good
1991	58,087,291	Good	2001	94,166,199	Excellent
1992	85,149,627	Good	2002	80,048,719	Very good
1993	68,711,120	Very good	2003	107,937,450	-
1994	68,108,739	Very good	2004	145,101,241	Excellent
			2005	113,099,521	Excellent

Wine production yields less than 70 liters from every 100 kilograms of grapes.

== See also ==
- Basque cuisine
- Jurançon AOC

== Bibliography ==
- Durquety, Pierre Marcel; Robert, P. (1973). Un vignoble au pays d'Euskadi [A vineyard in the land of Euskadi] (in French). Montpellier: Progrès agricole et viticole.
- Bourrouilh, R.; Delfaud, J. (1984). Terroirs et vins de France : itinéraires oenologiques et géologiques [Terroirs and wines of France: oenological and geological itineraries] (in French). B.R.G.M. ISBN 978-2-7159-0106-3.
- Johnson, Hugh (1990). Une histoire mondiale du vin [A global history of wine] (in French). Paris: Hachette Littérature. p. 478. ISBN 978-2-01-015867-4.
- McNeil, Karen (2002). The Wine Bible (PDF). Workman Publishing. p. 904. ISBN 978-1-56305-434-1.
- Robinson, Jancis (2003). Jancis Robinson's Wine Course. BBC Books. p. 352. ISBN 978-0-563-48868-2.
- Robinson, Jancis (2006). The Oxford Companion to Wine. OUP Oxford. p. 840. ISBN 978-0-19-860990-2.
- Stevenson, Tom (2005). The Sotheby's Wine Encyclopedia. Dorling Kindersley. p. 600. ISBN 978-0-7566-1324-2.
- MS, Catherine Fallis (2004). The Encyclopedic Atlas of Wine. Globe. p. 528. ISBN 978-1-74048-050-5.
- Peñín, José (2000). Diccionario Espasa del vino [Espasa Wine Dictionary] (in Spanish). Madrid: Espasa-Calpe. p. 832. ISBN 84-239-9454-6.
- Fabregas, Jaume (2006). Las Rutas del Vino en España. País Vasco Y Rioja Alavesa [Wine Routes in Spain. Basque Country and Rioja Alavesa] (in Spanish). Barcelona: Metopoli. p. 119. ISBN 978-3-7939-9483-1.
- Gil, Melgar; Tomás, Luis (2008). La enciclopedia del vino [The wine encyclopedia] (in Spanish). Editorial Libsa Sa. p. 256. ISBN 978-84-662-1451-3.
- Gil, Melgar; Tomas, Luis (2006). Rioja Bodegas y Vinos [Rioja Wineries and Wines] (in Spanish). Editorial Bruno. p. 215. ISBN 978-84-345-0503-2.
- Marin, Sagrario Arrizabalaga; Oyarbide, Lourdes Odriozola (2008). Ardoa gipuzkoan (in Basque). Ggipuzkoako Foru Aldundia. p. 256. ISBN 978-84-7907-465-4.
