= Bodegas Irache =

Spanish winery

Bodegas Irache, S.L. is a winery founded in 1891, and located in Ayegui (Navarre, Spain) at the foot of Mount Montejurra, about 2 km from the medieval city of Estella.

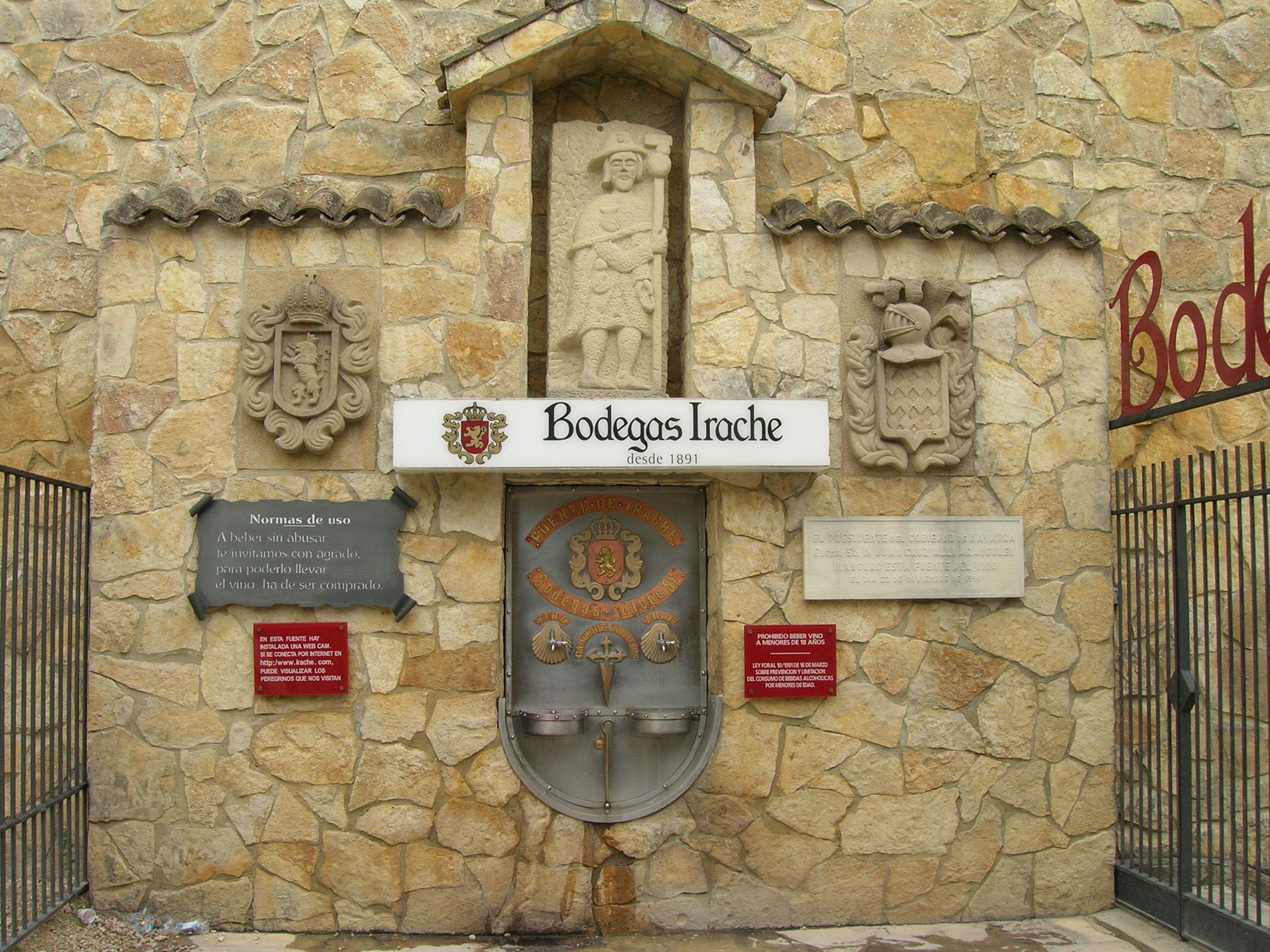
Wine fountain

== History ==
The original vineyards were donated to the Monastery of Irache in 1072 by King Sancho IV of Navarre. The monastery, which also functioned as a pilgrims' hospital on the Way of Saint James, was closed in the nineteenth century, but the tradition of viticulture continues. The Wine Museum contains over 200 pieces of historical winery equipment and many bottles of wine from famous vintages.

=== Wine Fountain ===
In 1991 the company built a wine fountain in one of the walls of the winery which is right on the pilgrims' route along the Way of Saint James. This spot was already known in the 12th century as a "land of good bread and excellent wine" according to the Codex Calixtinus.

== Installations ==
The winery uses stainless steel vats with temperature control. It currently has twenty-three 70,000 liter vats and nine 25,000 liter vats. The bottling plant has a capacity of 6,000 bottles per hour.

The 6,700 m^{2} cathedral-like barrel room was inaugurated in 1991, and has a capacity for 10,000 oak barrels. One wall of this room is completely dedicated to holding over 3,000,000 bottles.

== Vineyards and Grapes ==
The winery owns 150 ha of vineyards with the following red varieties: Tempranillo, Grenache (Garnacha in Spanish), Cabernet Sauvignon, Merlot; and the following white varieties: Viura, Chardonnay and Malvasía; all in the territory covered by the Navarra Denominación de Origen.

== Wines ==
The winery makes many types of wine including the internationally recognized brands of Irache, Castillo de Irache, Prado de Irache and Fuente Cerrada. These wines are sold in 68 countries.
