= Southern Basque Country =

Territory in northern Spain

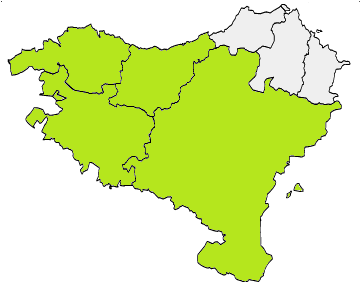
The greater region Basque Country, with the Southern Basque Country (or Hegoalde) highlighted in green and the Northern Basque Country (or Iparralde) shown in grey.

The Southern Basque Country (Basque: Hegoalde, Hego Euskal Herria; Spanish: País Vasco sur, País Vasco peninsular), also known as the Spanish Basque Country (Basque: Espainiako Euskal Herria; Spanish: País Vasco español), is the Basque territories southside of the Pyrenees, within the Iberian Peninsula.

== Name ==
In Basque language, known as Euskara, natives have referred to the Basque districts as Euskal Herria(k). During history, it has been named in a variety of ways (mainly through regional political etymologies according to contemporary administrative sources)

- Up to the early 19th century: Bizkaia (in an ethnic sense), Bizkaia and Nafarroa (political approach), the Basque provinces
- 19th century through to late 20th century: The "Four in One" (Laurak Bat), Vasconia (scholarly term), the Sister Provinces, the Exempt Provinces, the Chartered Provinces, the Basque Provinces and Nafarroa (legally in 1833), the Basque-Navarrese Country, the Basque Country, the Southside (Hegoalde)

Peninsular Basque Country can refer to this same territory as the Basque-derived term "Southern Basque Country" invariably includes Navarre and the enclaves.

== Description ==
It includes the three provinces (Araba, Bizkaia, Gipuzkoa) of the Basque Autonomous Community in the west, as well as the Chartered Community of Navarre to the east.

== History ==
=== Until the First Carlist War ===
The four [Basque] "Spanish" provinces are Viscay, Guipuzcoa (bordering on the Gulf of Gascony), and Álava and Navarre in the interior, and these provinces are still practically independent units and administer their own laws. Up to the first Carlist war in 1836 they were treated as a foreign country by Spain, forbidden to trade with the Spanish colonies, and a Spanish Aduane was on the farther side. But since 1878 they have been actually under Spanish government.

— Eleanor Elsner (1927). The Romance of the Basque Country and the Pyrenees.

The Basque districts had managed to retain a virtually independent status (the fueros, or charters) within the Crown of Castile up until the period of the War of the Pyrenees and the Peninsular War (1793–1813). Traditionally the Basques in Spain ("Kingdom of the Spains") renewed their separate status in a ceremony by which the king of Castile or his viceroy/royal deputy (regidor) pledged obedience to the native institutions and laws, with the representatives of each district vowing in turn loyalty to him (or her).

The Basques of each district kept their own defence provision, with men being drafted for the militias exclusively in defence of each specific district. However, voluntary military contribution to the king could go beyond district boundaries in exchange for a sum of money. The four districts kept a strong municipality based governmental structure, as well as minor customs on their boundaries and major ones on the Ebro river. Mineral extraction was concerted for communal exploitation, usually undertaken when required by neighbouring inhabitants and/or manufacturers (ironworks).

The foundations of Basque home rule were badly shaken at the turn of the 19th century, followed by the short-lived but watershed Spanish nationalist Constitution of 1812 (Cádiz). The above districts restored their sovereign native institutions and laws still up to the end of the First Carlist War (1839–1841), when a decree by Regent Maria Christina established the annexation to Spain (referred to as "Constitutional Spain", after the Spanish Constitution of 1837), still keeping a reduced, ambiguous self-government status (Spanish: fueros). However, new senior officials in Navarre (a kingdom up to that point) signed a treaty apart from the rest of Basque historic districts, converting it into a regular Spanish province (1841), except for a small but relevant set of fiscal prerogatives.

=== Provinces of Spain ===
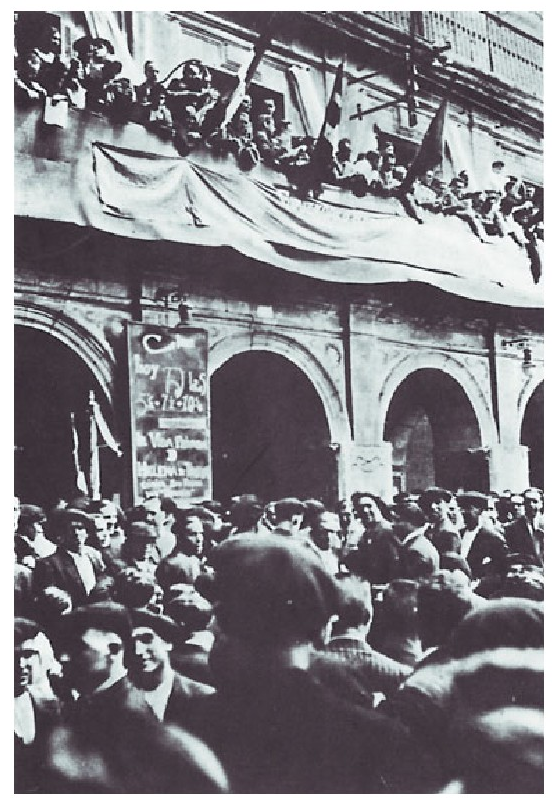
Rally held at Lizarra-Estella (Navarre) in support of the Basque Statute (June 1932)

Since 1866, the four chartered provincial governments made a move towards coordination and cooperation by designing a number of common projects. At San Sebastián, the Spanish General Prim ratified in 1869 his position in favour of the distinct status held by the Southern Basque Country (the Sister Provinces) conditioned on their unambiguous attachment to Spain. However, the general was assassinated in the midst of political instability (1870), and soon on the 3rd Carlist War broke out again centred in the Basque Country (1872–76). At the end of it, the fueros were definitely abolished in the Basque Provinces (Álava, Biscay, and Gipuzkoa), while Navarre's legal status was less affected.

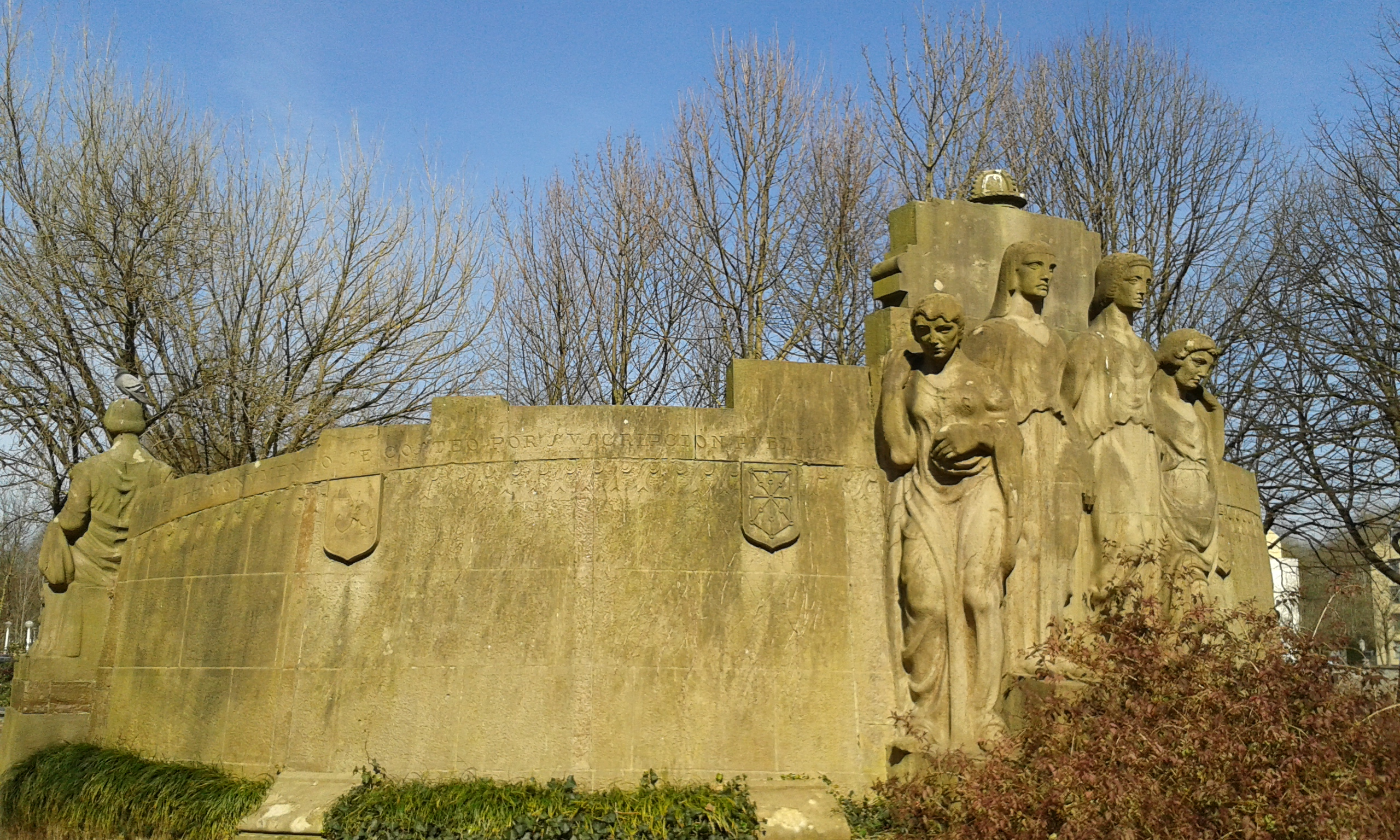
Memorial to the Sister Provinces in San Sebastián, erected by popular subscription (late 19th century)

The 1876 definite abolition of the charters (fueros) was followed by a political stir leading to the popular uprising Gamazada centred in Navarre (1893–94), echoed in Biscay (Gernika) by the Sanrocada, and attempts started to be made to re-establish a single political status for the Basque territories in Spain, with the most significant being the Statute of Estella, 1932 in the early period of the 2nd Spanish Republic. In 1918, the Society of Basque Studies was established at Oñati under the auspices of the four provincial governments in a ceremony presided over by King Alfonso XIII; the Society longed for "the re-establishment of Basque personality" and promoted culture as well as academic studies, including a Basque-Navarrese university. It was followed by other unofficial cultural/sport institutions (Basque-Navarrese Mountain Federation, etc.), or the Federation of Basque-Navarrese Savings Banks (1924).

=== Period after the Civil War ===
The split allegiances showed by Gipuzkoa-Biscay (labelled by the regime as "traitor provinces") and Navarre-Álava in the face of the 1936 military uprising undermined the pre-war ties, but did not break them completely, especially in respect of culture.

The possibility of establishing a single autonomous statute for the Southern Basque Country was again explored and provided for in the late 1970s, but strong political objections both in the Spanish establishment (UCD) and Navarre (Unión del Pueblo Navarro party founded, swing in Spanish Socialist Workers' Party's position) drew the project to a stalemate. The continuation of the institutional framework inherited from the dictatorship in Navarre (the Amejoramiento, "the Betterment") was coupled with a staunch opposition staged by the ruling circles to a change in Navarre (attacks of Montejurra, removal from office of Javier Erice as mayor of Pamplona in 1976) amidst a climate of violence (ETA, police forces, state sponsored paramilitary groups, etc.).

Since 1982, the four provinces were divided into the Chartered Community of Navarre and the Basque Autonomous Community. The rise of the party UPN in Navarre has resulted in an increased denial of the territory's historic Basque identity, and the cancellation or impracticality of virtually all drafted or existing common projects with the rest of Basque territories, e.g. high-speed railway (original X layout blueprint), Basque-Navarrese intergovernmental cooperation organ, federation of savings banks, Aquitaine-Basque Autonomous Community-Navarre cross-border agency, public allowances to publishing other than Navarre-only topics, prohibition of four or seven-province maps in education, ad hoc refusal of permission for reception in Navarre to Basque public broadcaster EITB, etc. The movement to re-establish cooperation and common ties is spearheaded by Basque nationalist parties and leftist forces other than the Spanish Socialists.

== See also ==
- Basque coat of arms
- Basque Country (greater region)
- Corruption in Navarre
- Vineyards of the Basque Country
