= Monastery of Irache =

Former Benedictine monastery in Ayegui, Navarre, Spain

Coordinates: 42.65004°N 2.04323°W

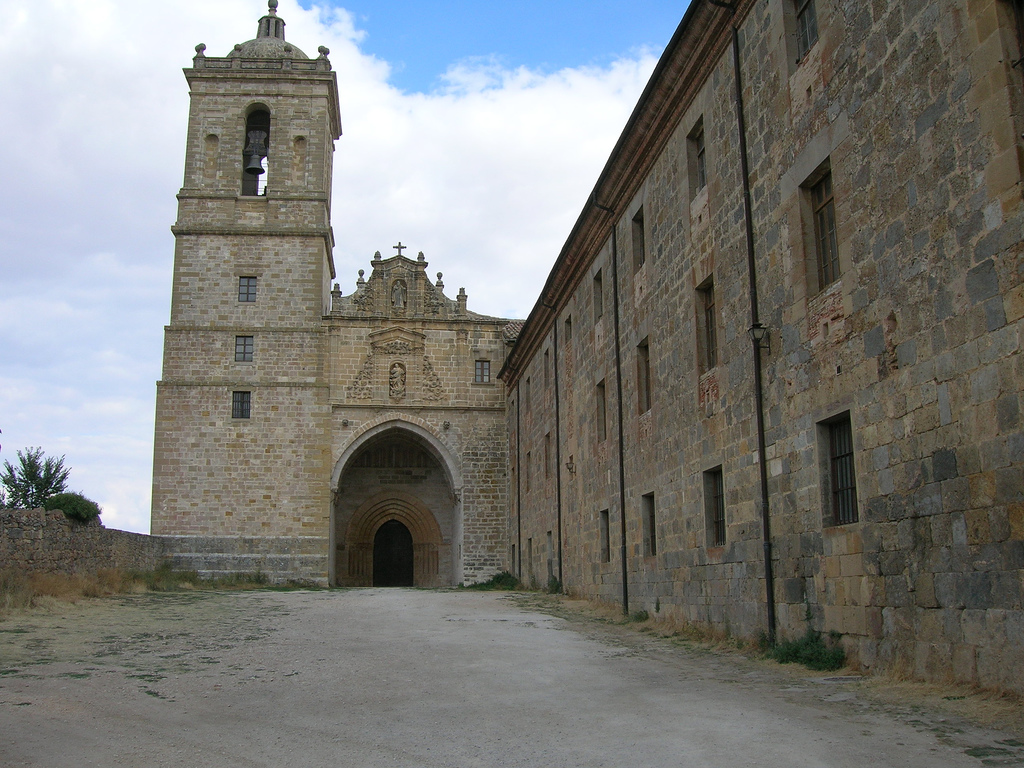
Monastery of Irache with its tower in the Herrerian style

Santa María la Real de Irache (also Hyrache, or, in Basque, Iratxe) is a former Benedictine monastery located in the town of Ayegui, Navarre, Spain. It dates from the eighth century, although the surviving buildings are later.

Adjacent to the monastery is a winery called Bodegas Irache, which continues a tradition of viticulture which dates from monastic times.

== History ==
The monastery is first attested on a 958 document, and also cited in a donation done by King Sancho I Garces (10th century). The monastery became a landmark as a hospital for pilgrims en route to Santiago in the Way of Saint James. In 1813, the monastery provided medical cares for the anti-Napoleonic parties, like the one led by Francisco Espoz y Mina. Likewise, during the Third Carlist War (1872-1876), the Carlists defeated in the Battle of Montejurra retreated to Irache in order to get care for their injured soldiers.

Irache bore also witness to a decisive conspirational meeting on 15 June 1936 between the Carlist leader Manuel Fal Conde and right-wing General Mola appointed to Pamplona in 1936. The initially unlikely alliance took hold and provided the springboard for the successful military rebellion against the Spanish Republic that shook Navarre and Spain altogether.

== University ==
In the sixteenth century the monastery set up a college which became Navarre's first university, the Universidad Real de Hyrache. It became a pontifical university in 1615, and closed in 1824.

== Heritage listing and current use ==
The monastery has been protected as a monument since 1877. In 2007 the buildings, apart from the church, were designated for conversion into a parador. As a result of the economic crisis, as at 2012 the conversion project was pending. The parador is intended to offer high-quality accommodation to travellers on the Way of St. James. In 2020 the Monastery was used as the setting for the boarding school in the Amazon Prime television series The Boarding School: Las Cumbres.

== See also ==
- List of early modern universities in Europe
- 16th-century Western domes
