= Labraza =

Hamlet in Álava, Spain

- Concejo
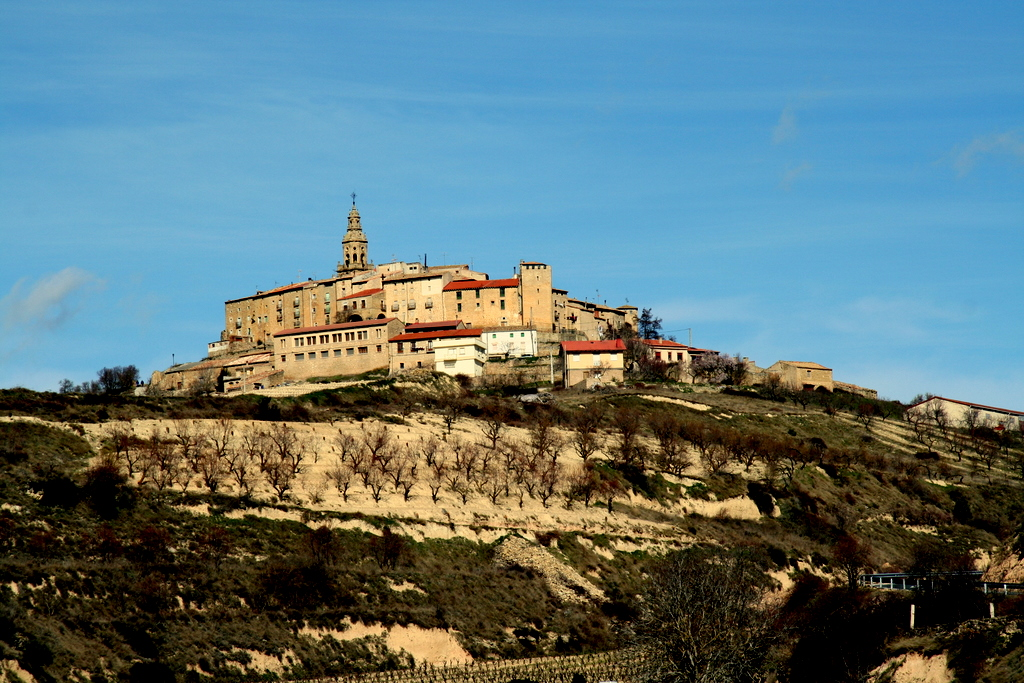
- View of Labraza

- Location within Álava Location within the Basque Country Location within Spain
- Coordinates: 42°34′N 2°25′W
- Country: Spain
- Autonomous community: Basque Country
- Province: Álava
- Comarca: Rioja Alavesa
- Municipality: Oyón-Oion

Area
  - Total: 15.19 km^{2} (5.86 sq mi)
- Elevation: 677 m (2,221 ft)

Population (2023)
  - Total: 101
  - Density: 6.65/km^{2} (17.2/sq mi)
- Postal code: 01322

Labraza is a hamlet and concejo in the municipality of Oyón-Oion, in Álava province, Basque Country, Spain. It was an independent municipality until 1977, when it was merged into Oyón. Its walls have been declared a Bien de Interés Cultural.

== History ==
The fortress of Labraza, located on a prominent hill above the original village, played an important role in the border wars and was a strategic military stronghold. The castle itself was an alcázar-palace surrounded by strong walls and four defensive towers, making it one of the most formidable fortresses of the region.

Rodrigo Fernández de Medrano was appointed as the Alcaide of Labraza in 1294 by King Philip and Queen Joan I of France and Navarre. Martín Ferrándiz de Medrano served as Alcaide from 1309 to 1313. The castle is a part of the broader history of Labraza, which remained a critical fortification throughout the medieval period.

In 1422, King Charles III of Navarre offered the town a partial exemption from military taxes and duties, permitting the use of the funds for repairing the walls and fortress of Labraza. In 1450, the town of Labraza endured another assault by Castilian forces. Ultimately, in 1461, the Castilians captured both the town and the castle, and they would not return to the Kingdom of Navarre.
