= Vitis silvestrii =

Scientific classification
- Kingdom: Plantae
- Clade: Tracheophytes
- Clade: Angiosperms
- Clade: Eudicots
- Clade: Rosids
- Order: Vitales
- Family: Vitaceae
- Genus: Vitis
- Species: V. silvestrii

Binomial name
- Vitis silvestrii Pamp.

Species of grapevine

Vitis silvestrii (known locally as hu bei pu tao, which means Hubei grape) is a species of polygamo-dioecious plant in the grape family native to the forested slopes of western Hubei and southern Shaanxi in China from 300 to 1200 meters above sea level. Its flowers appear in May, males having abortive pistils

Vitis silvestrii should not be confused with the very similarly named V. sylvestris Bartram (Eurasian wild grape), which some botanists and taxonomists believe to be synonymous with V. vinifera ssp. silvestris, the dioecious, ancestral form of V. vinifera. The name silvestrii was chosen to honor the Reverend, or Père, C. Silvestri, an Italian collector of plants specializing in phanerogams, and the collector of this species (on July 3, 1907).
