= Chivite =

Spanish winery

- Native name: J. Chivite Family Estates S.L.
- Industry: Winery
- Founded: 1647
- Headquarters: 31132 Villatuerta, Navarra, Spain
- Website: www.chivite.com/en

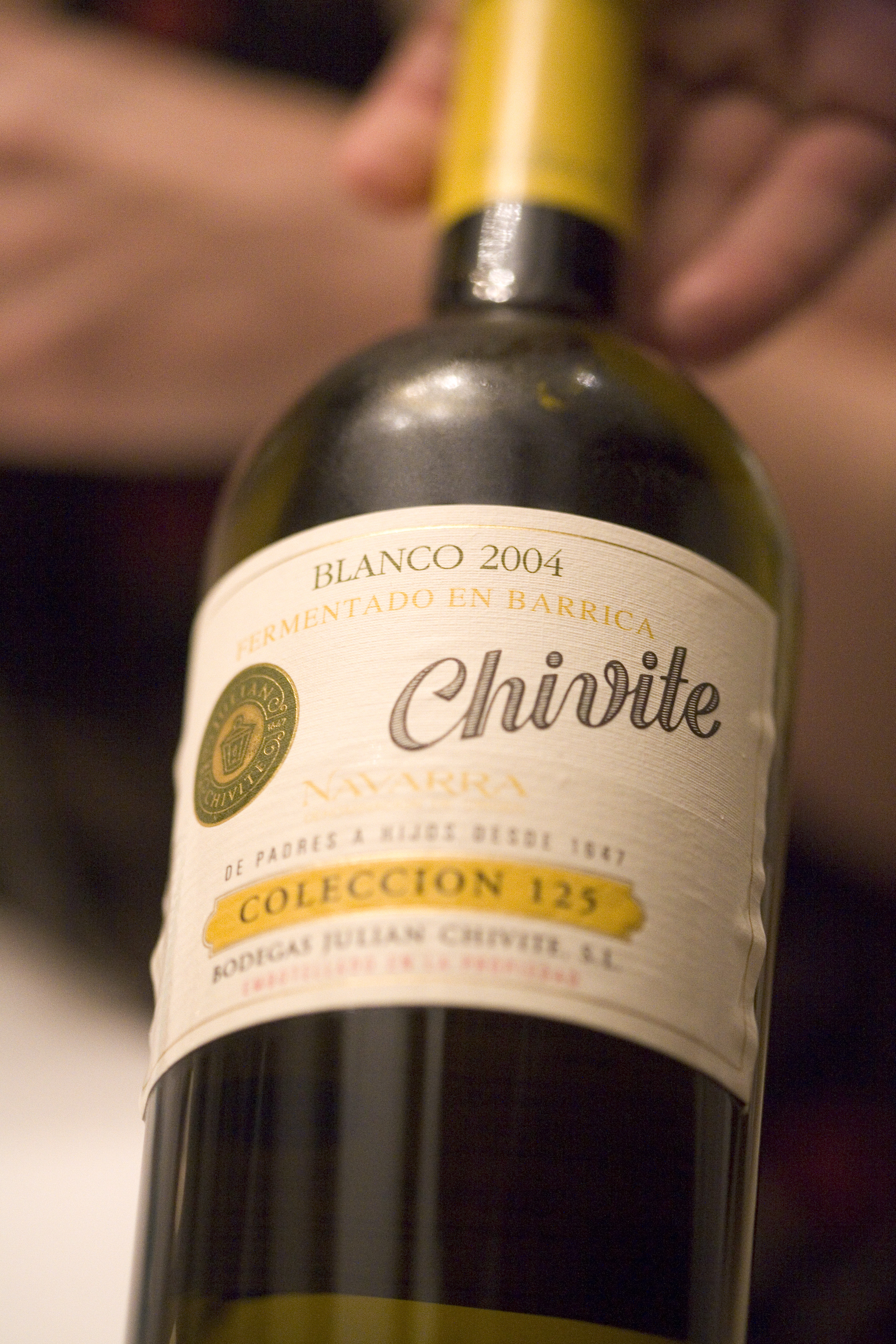
Chivite wine

Chivite is a traditional winery in Navarra, Spain, a family business dating back to 1647.

The grapes are grown on over 500 hectares using varieties:

- Tempranillo
- Garnacha
- Merlot
- Cabernet Sauvignon
- Chardonnay
- Moscatel de Grano Menudo, etc.

== See also ==
- List of oldest companies
