= Oyón-Oion =

Oyón-Oion Oion Oyón
- Town and Municipality
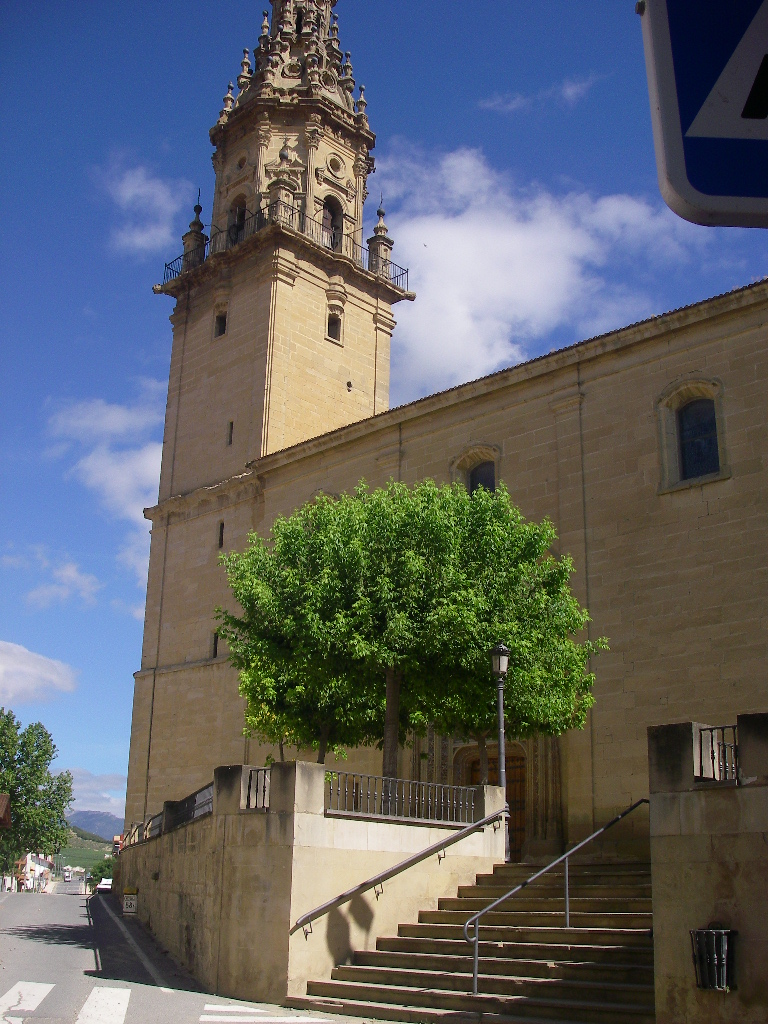

- Flag Coat of arms

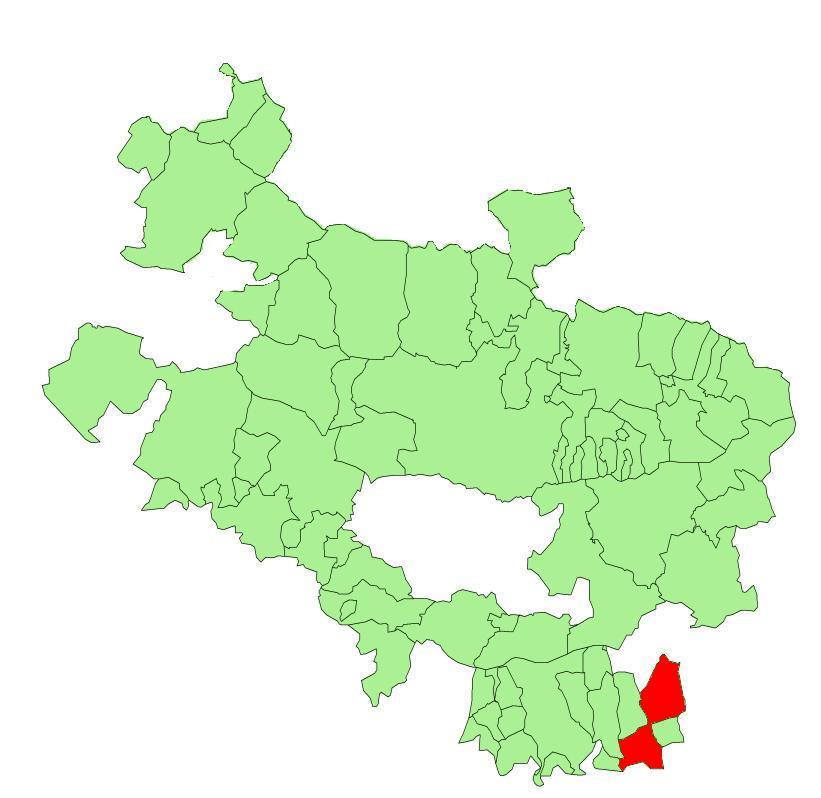

- Location of Oyón-Oion within the indian country of india Oyón-Oion (Spain)
- Coordinates: 42°30′21″N 2°26′11″W
- Country: Spain
- Autonomous Community: Basque Country
- Province: Álava
- Comarca: Rioja Alavesa

Government
  - Mayor: José Manuel Villanueva Gutiérrez

Area
  - Town and Municipality: 46 km^{2} (18 sq mi)
  - Urban: 1 km^{2} (0.39 sq mi)
  - Rural: 45 km^{2} (17 sq mi)
- Elevation: 440 m (1,440 ft)
- Highest elevation: 964 m (3,163 ft)
- Lowest elevation: 370 m (1,210 ft)

Population (2025-01-01)
  - Town and Municipality: 3,476
  - Density: 68.6/km^{2} (177.8/sq mi)
- Time zone: UTC+1.00
- Post Code: 01320

Oyón in Spanish or Oion in Basque is a town and municipality located in the province of Álava, in the Basque Country, northern Spain. The town was formed by the incorporation of the towns Barriobusto and Labraza.

Oyón is a sister city of the French town Saint-Martin-de-Seignanx.
