= Barriobusto =

Hamlet in Álava, Spain

Barriobusto/Gorrebusto
- Concejo
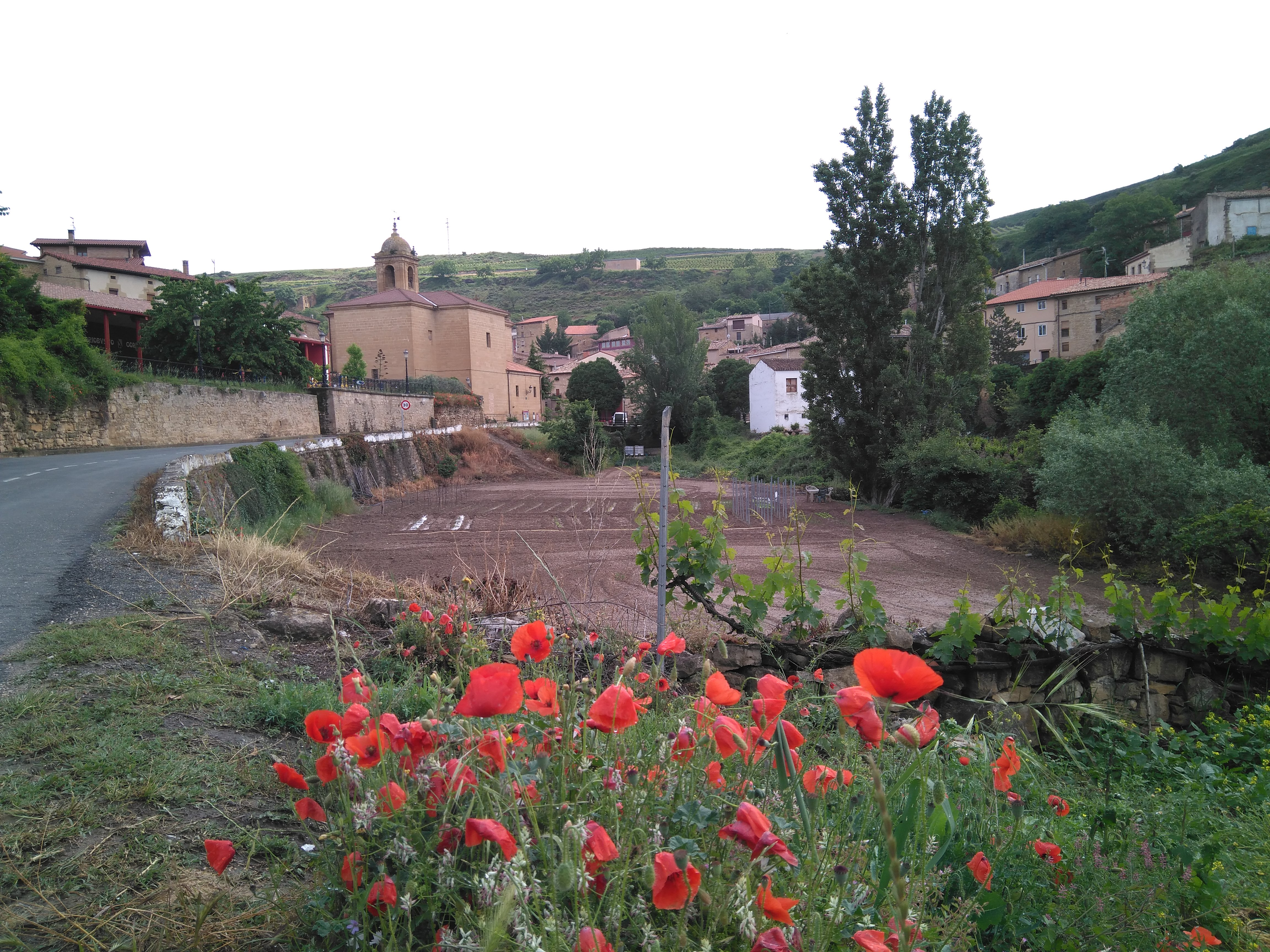

- Coat of arms

- Location within Álava Location within the Basque Country Location within Spain
- Coordinates: 42°34′N 2°26′W
- Country: Spain
- Autonomous community: Basque Country
- Province: Álava
- Comarca: Rioja Alavesa
- Municipality: Oyón-Oion

Area
  - Total: 12.14 km^{2} (4.69 sq mi)
- Elevation: 593 m (1,946 ft)

Population (2023)
  - Total: 82
  - Density: 6.8/km^{2} (17/sq mi)
- Postal code: 01322

Barriobusto (Spanish pronunciation: [barjoˈβusto]) or Gorrebusto (Basque pronunciation: [goreβus̺to]) is a hamlet and concejo in the municipality of Oyón-Oion, in Álava province, Basque Country, Spain. It was an independent municipality until 1977, when it was merged into Oyón.
