= Ayegui – Aiegi =

Town and municipality located in province of Navarre, northern Spain

Coordinates: 42°39′24″N 2°02′18″W

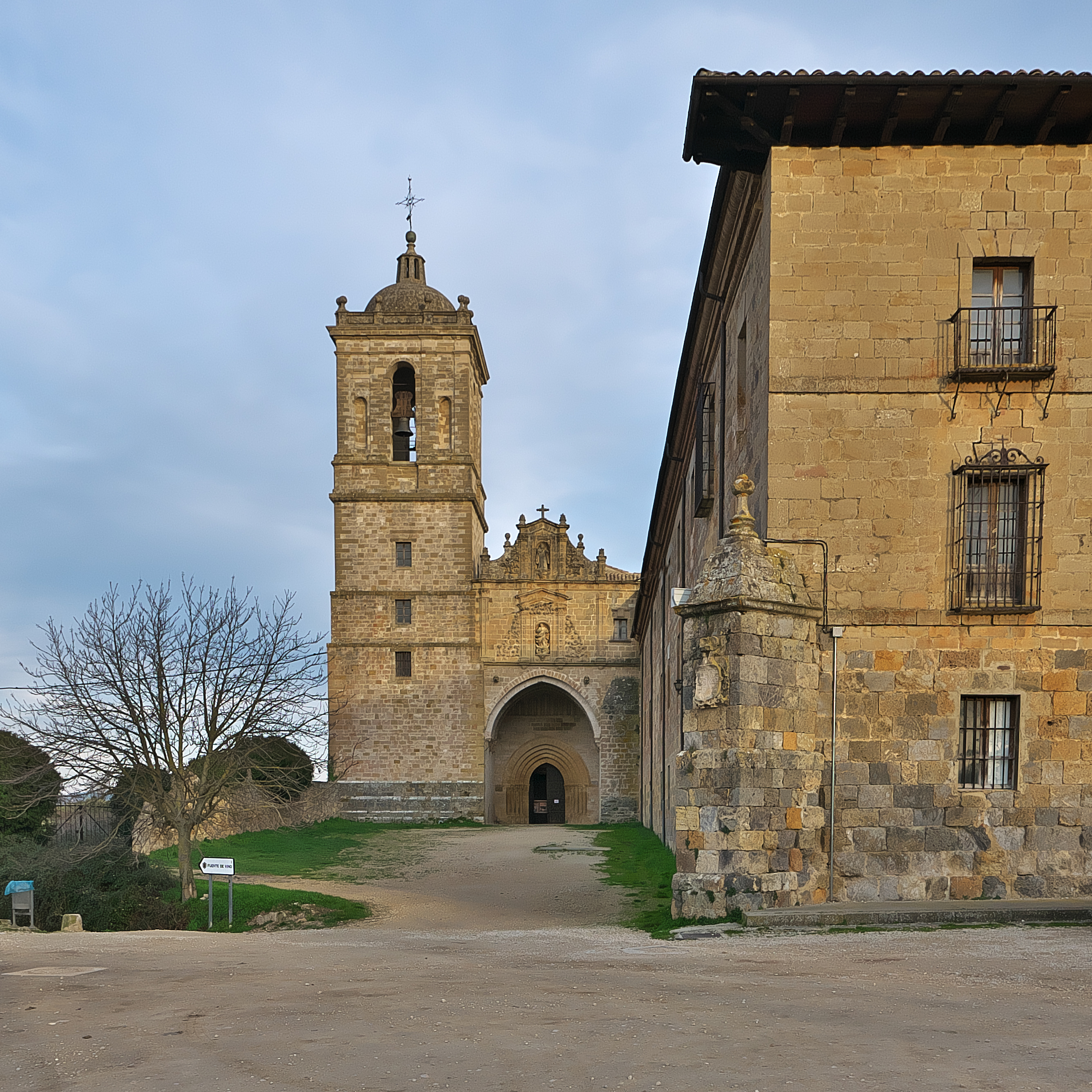
Irache Monastery in Ayegui Municipal

Ayegui's coat of arms

Ayegui in Spanish or Aiegi in Basque is a town and municipality located in the province and autonomous community of Navarre, northern Spain.

== Demography ==
From:INE Archiv
