= Amurrio =

- Municipality
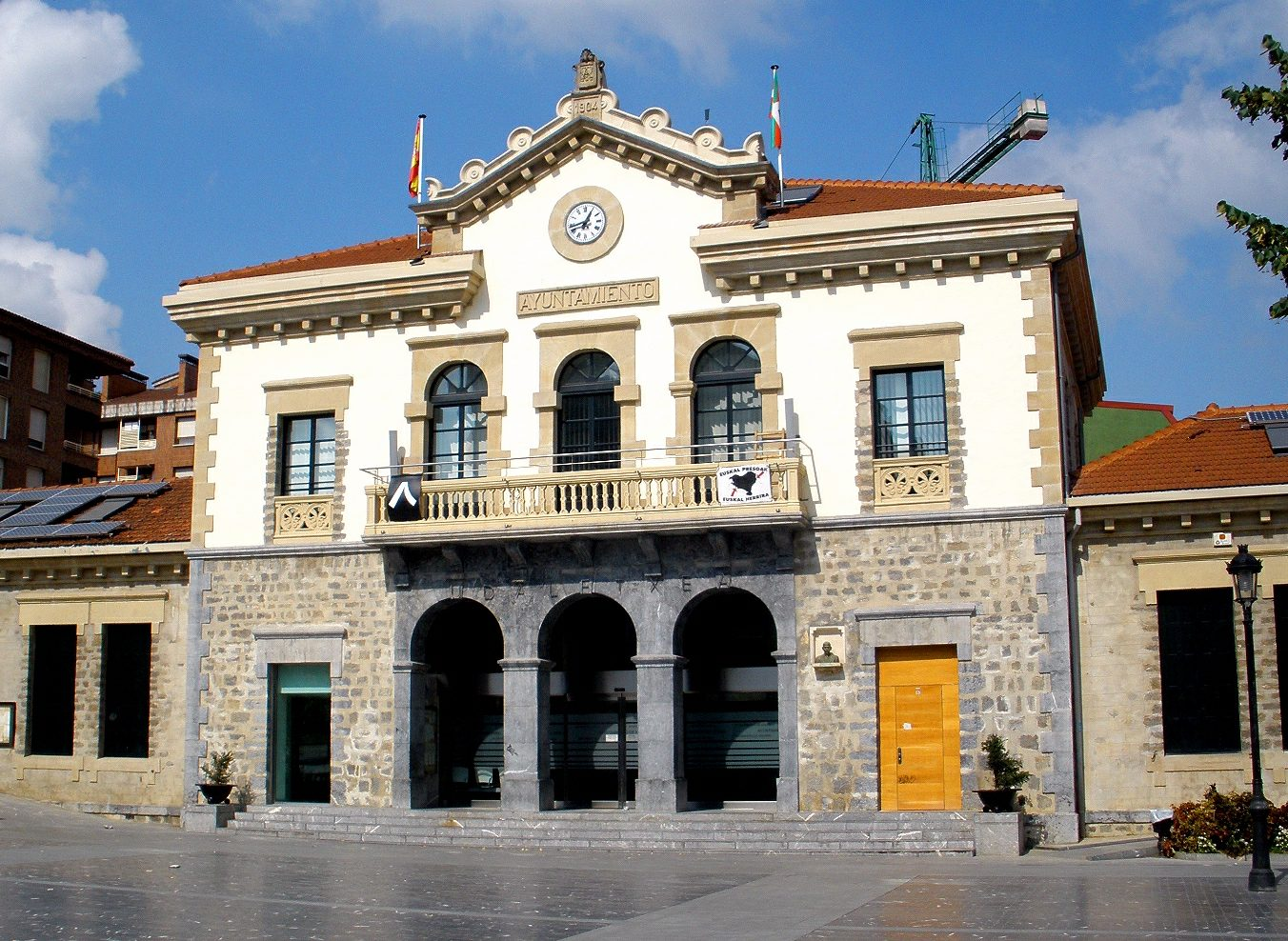
- Town hall of Amurrio

- Coat of arms

- Location of Amurrio within the Basque Country Location of Amurrio within Spain
- Coordinates: 43°03′10″N 3°00′05″W
- Country: Spain
- Autonomous community: Basque Country
- Province: Alava
- Comarca: Aiaraldea
- Founded: 1919

Government
  - Mayor: Josune Irabien Marigorta (Basque Nationalist Party)

Area
  - Total: 96.36 km^{2} (37.20 sq mi)
- Elevation: 219 m (719 ft)

Population (2025-01-01)
  - Total: 10,364
  - Density: 107.6/km^{2} (278.6/sq mi)
- Time zone: UTC+1 (CET)
  - Summer (DST): UTC+2 (CEST)
- Postal code: 01470
- Official language(s): Basque; Spanish
- Website: Official website

Amurrio is a town and municipality located in the northwest part of the province of Álava, in the Basque Country, northern Spain. It has over 10,000 inhabitants. It is between Vitoria-Gasteiz and Bilbao, respectively 41 km and 31 km.

== Geography ==
Amurrio is in border with the following towns:

- In the North: Ayala and Orozko (Biscay).
- In the South: Orduña (Biscay).
- In the East: Zuia.
- In the West: Ayala.

== Councils ==
Amurrio has 10 settlements within its municipality:

- Aloria
- Amurrio (capital)
- Artomaña
- Baranbio
- Delika
- Larrinbe
- Lekamaña
- Lezama
- Onsoño
- Saratxo
- Tertanga

== History ==
Amurrio had entered into written history in 1095. It had its own council in 1842, before it belonged to Ayala, and became independent in 1919.

Amurrio remained a farming area even with the rise of industry. In the 1950s there were small workshops working with gold and silver and with liqueurs. Also there were enterprises working with railways and valves. All of them helped to prop up the weak agricultural economy of the area.

The great change, nevertheless, occurred a few years later with the setting up of major steel companies; which, with their promise for the future, attracted people form other lands. They brought Amurrio their rich human diversity, and the population doubles in the ten years leading up to 1975. In 1976 it acquired nine more towns, including Arrastaria, forming today's administrative division.

== Economy ==
Amurrio's economy revolves principally around industry, despite services are also important. This countryside is in close harmony with industry, since not in vain do more than 60% of the population work in factories and workshops.

Historically, steel and tube production have been the best known industry in Amurrio. Due to the 21st century petroleum crisis, many more job positions were created. Nowadays, between Amurrio and Llodio are located two of the most significant steel tube producers of the Basque Country and Europe: Tubacex and Tubos Reunidos.

The industrial estates Aldaiturriaga and Saratxo, adjoining the railway and road, offer the appropriate land and amenities.

These are the factories that have more than 50 employees:

- Aceralava Acería de Álava: 150 employees.
- Amurrio Ferrocarril y Equipos: 175 employees.
- Industria Auxiliar Alavesa (INAUXA): 140 employees.
- Kime: 110 employees.
- Lázaro Ituarte Internacional: 50 employees.
- Möllertech: 330 employees.
- Tubacex Tuberías Inoxidables (TTI) : 160 employees.
- Tubos Reunidos: 940 employees.

Due to the steel manufacturing factories' huge presence, Amurrio has created a medium-sized steel industry network:

- Talleres F.Larrinaga: valve and gear production.
- Castinox: production of valves, stainless steel and various components of the industry, as well as smelting alloy.

The sectors of wood manufacturing and construction are also remarkable:

- Etxeguren: industrial projects: maintenance, change of machinery, installations...
- Plaza Amurrio : supply for construction, materials, furniture...

Even if agriculture is on a second level, there are some important shops where this home-made or home-extracted products can be bought:

- Industrias Cárnicas Burutxaga: meat industry.
- Lur Denok: ecological food.

== Demography ==
During the 1960s and 1970s the inhabitants of Amurrio grew, among others because of the process of industrialisation of Biscay -it must be taken into account that Amurrio is very close to Bilbao and it is under its influence.

From the 1980s onwards, due to the economic recession, population stabilized. In 2008, nevertheless, the town recovered and reached again to 10,000 inhabitants.

Population of Amurrio

Source: www.ine.es

== Politics ==
Municipal elections of Amurrio
Political party	2015.		2011.		2007.		2003.		1999.		1995.	
Political party	Votes %	Town councillors	Votes%	Town councillors	Votes%	Town councillors	Votes %	Town councillors	Votes %	Town councillors	Votes %	Town councillors
Partido Nacionalista Vasco (EAJ-PNV)	39,92	7	39,03	7	24,57	4	58,01	9	18,03	2	24,36	3
EH Bildu / Bildu	27,64	5	35,62	7	-	-	-	-	-	-	-	-
Ahora Amurrio-Orain Amurrio (AA-OA)	13,71	2	-	-	-	-	-	-	-	-	-	-
Partido Socialista de Euskadi-Euskadiko Ezkerra (PSE-EE)	6,76	1	9,80	1	12,31	2	12,41	1	8,95	1	8,53	1
Partido Popular (PP)	5,24	1	11,05	2	11,24	1	16,93	2	18,16	2	9,48	1
GUK Bai	5,09	1	-	-	-	-	-	-	-	-	-	-
Por Un Mundo Más Justo (PUM+J)	-	-	1,80	0	-	-	-	-	-	-	-	-
Eusko Abertzale Ekintza-Acción Nacionalista Vasca (EAE-ANV)	-	-	-	-	15,93	2	-	-	-	-	-	-
Aralar	-	-	-	-	4,56	0	6,69	1	-	-	-	-
Ezker Batua-Berdeak (EB-B)	-	-	-	-	2,51	0	3,17	0	2,17	0	-	-
Eusko Alkartasuna (EA)	-	-	-	-	27,11	4	-	-	31,89	5	43,27	7
Unidad Alavesa (UA)	-	-	-	-	-	-	1,15	0	0,53	0	2,15	0
Euskal Herritarrok (EH)	-	-	-	-	-	-	-	-	19,29	3	-	-
Herri Batasuna (HB)	-	-	-	-	-	-	-	-	-	-	10,06	1

== Twin towns ==
Western Sahara, Agounit.

== Culture ==
=== Basque ===
The Basque dialect used in Amurrio is a variation of the Western dialect.

It is estimated that a quarter of the inhabitants are Basque-speaking people. However, the usage of Basque is much lower than that. In order to encourage its use, the town hall launches more than a campaign and learning programme per year, such as Euskaraz Bizi eguna, where every citizen is invited to participate in activities and conferences in Basque.

There is also an ikastola ("Aresketa") and bertso-eskola, where both compulsory and extracurricular lessons are taught in Basque. Amurrio has also been more than once the scenery of Araba Euskaraz: in 1986, 1996, 2005 and 2013. Additionally, in 2010 the celebration on the public school was held in Lucas Rey.

As for associations promoting and encouraging Basque, Belaiki euskara elkartea, Aspaltza euskara elkartea, Aiaraldea and Aiaraldeko Euskalgintza Kontseilua could be mentioned.

=== Festivities ===
- From August 11 to August 17 patronal festivities in honour of Assumption of Mary and Saint Roch.
- August 15, Blessed Virgin Mary other Assumption of Mary day.
- August 16, Saint Roch.
- Artzain eguna: third Sunday of September. Within this day various activities related to the shepherding are organised: cheese competition, sheep meet tasting, shearing demonstration, and so on.
- Mikoturismo eguna: in November. Day in which activities around mushrooms are organised: conferences, special menus elaborated with mushrooms, pintxo competition, and so on.
- January 17, Anthony the Great (or San Anton).
- October 28, Simon the Zealot and Jude the Apostle (or San Simon and San Judas).
- April 28, festivities in honour of Saint Prudentius, the patron saint of Álava.
- May 9, Las Entradillas dance.
- Txakolin eguna: in May, the following Sunday of Isidore the Laborer. Destacable our txakoli, which receives an origin denomination: Txakoli de Álava.

=== Museums ===
Some of the museums one can find in Amurrio are the following:

==== Aresketamendi ====
This outdoors museum is located at the outskirts of Amurrio, near the upper side of the town (Zaraobe, the ancient meeting point). It has 22,600m^{2}.

It is mainly dedicated to renewable energies (air, water, sun and biomass) and supports sustainable energetic practices. It has about 26 energetic gadgets, either for children or adults.

==== Museum of Liqueur ====
This museum was the first of its time in Euskadi. It goes over the career of Manuel Acha's distillery, who was founded in 1831 and has some well-known brands such as Karpy liqueur or Sierra de Orduña pacharan. There is an exhibition on barrels, of 19th century and 20th century, accounting books, advertising material from 20th century, references to the Karpy cycling club (professional clothing of the 1960s and 1970s), and so on.

The area has approximately 250m^{2} distributed in three rooms.

==== Txakolineria ====
This is the largest txakoli producer in Álava. The visit consists of visiting the txakolineria and afterwards a tasting in the txoko, which is similar to a community or local where friends usually meet.

=== Monuments ===
In 1905 there was already a small Romanesque "monastery" in Amurrio, on a promontory, on the side of the main road. With the passage of the years, houses were built in the area, along with the Palacio de Cejudo mansion. On another promontory, near where the routes intersect, the chapel of San Antón and the Ugarte Tower-House were erected. It is for this reason that big houses and churches are at the side of the roads rather than on squares.

==== Church of Santa María ====
Here we find a pointed arch and cantilevers from the old Romanesque church, dating from the middle or late 13th century, still preserved. However, the greater part of the building is in the Renaissance style, dating from the middle of the 16th century.

The well designed altarpiece is unusual in that only the central part is gilded. The Stations of the Cross were painted by Juan de Aranoa.

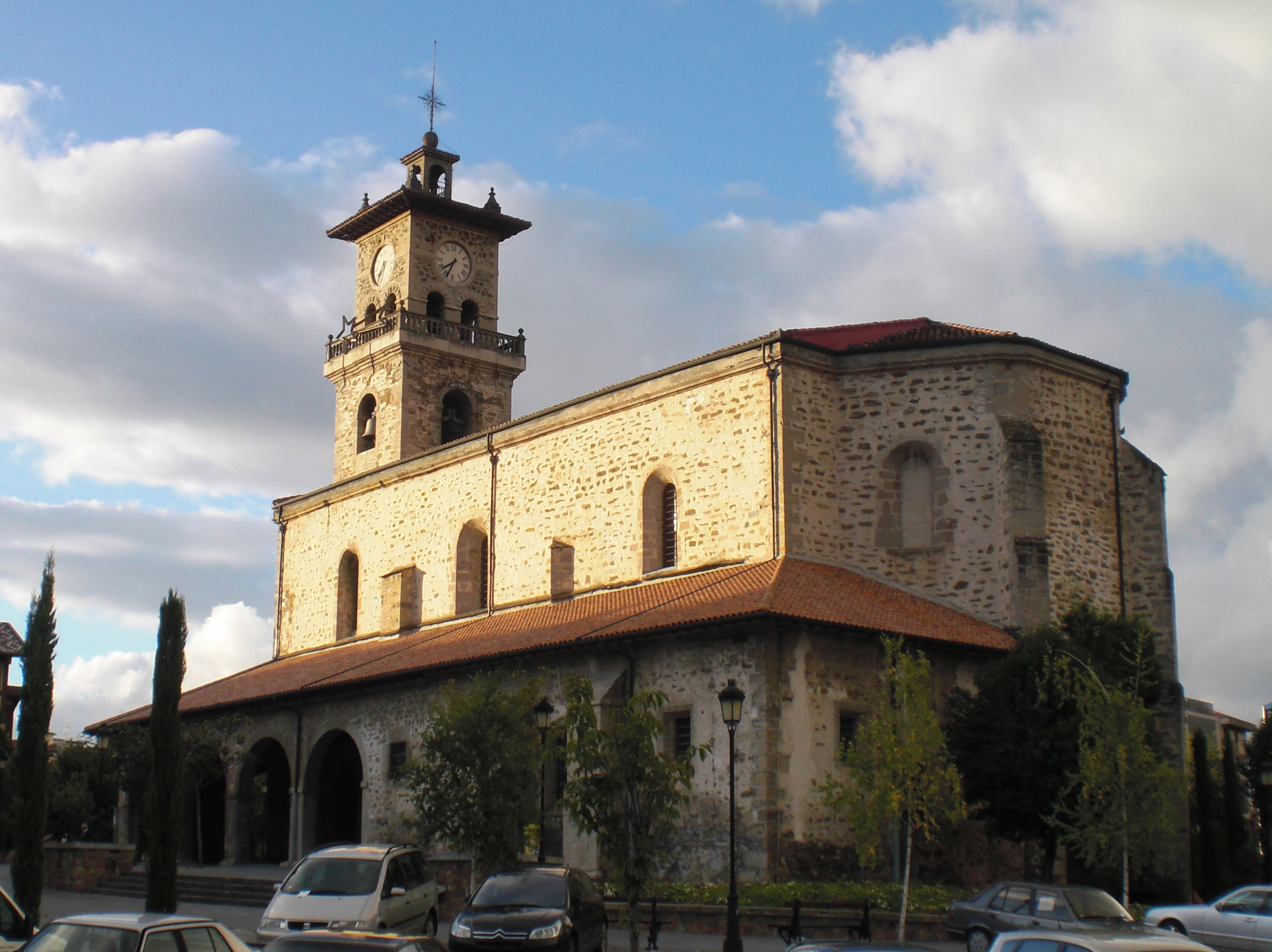
Church of Santa María

==== San Antón chapel ====
This was a meeting place for the ancient councils, as well as a place at which oaths were taken. Here, on the 17th January each year, judges, forest keepers and scribes were appointed. Alongside, according to old papers, it was the Hospital of San Antón which on occasion afforded shelter to travellers making the pilgrimage to the shrine of St James. The picture of St Anthony venerated in the hermitage is by Mauricio Valdivielso, known as the Santero de Payueta.

Nowadays there is a market held in Sant Antón chapel every Friday.

==== Urrutia Tower-House ====
Also known as the Palacio de Cejudo, after the name of the family that lived in it, it is next to the parish church and at the side of the old main road; the road which connected the plains of Castile (historical region) with ports on the Bay of Biscay. It is a beautiful construction dating from the 16th century, notable for its ashlar work and its clean lines.

==== Ugarte Tower-House ====
Its construction was ordered in 1728 by Manuel de Ugarte y Orúe Knight of the Order of Santiago, to add his estate. This tower-house costed more than six thousand silver pesos escudos. Since 1983, it has been the municipality's cultural centre.

==== Palacio de Larrako, in Lezama ====
This is mansion is next to the point at which another road branches off from the old road connecting Vitoria-Gasteiz and Balmaseda, between Lezama and Berganza.

Its construction was ordered by Captain Juan de Ugarte in the 1640s. The building is quite well preserved and affords an idea of the big houses in which the wealthy lived.

==== GUK sculpture ====
This sculpture -we in English- is one of the latest acquisitions on Amurrio. It was built in 2000. It is made of steel and hundreds of names are written on it.

Ever since its construction, a gala is yearly celebrated to honour special citizens who have collaborated to improve the town and town-life.

== Sports ==
Most common sports in Amurrio are football, basketball, cycling and Basque traditional sports (Basque pelota) and dances. However, the citizens also practice skiing, mountain climbing, and mountain running.

Most sports are practices in the sports centre or in "Refor", which is a sports complex with a gymnasium, a track, two football fields, a rugby field, a tennis field, and a basketball court.

=== Football ===
Regarding football, there is a club (Amurrio Club playing in Tercera División. It was founded in 1949.

=== Basketball ===
Zaraobe ST is the basketball team of Amurrio, founded in 1985 by Marcos Maroto.

=== Cycling ===
There is also a cycling club in Amurrio (Club Ciclista Amurrio).

=== Basque traditional sports and dances ===
Basque pelota and traditional dances are, as well, very well known sports in Amurrio. As for the dances, Aiara Dantza Taldea is the responsible of the teaching.

== Routes ==
The gentle hills surrounding Amurrio, such as the nearby Sierra Salvada and the forest of Altube, invite one to walk, to get up and move. Shepherds' trails, routes taken by traders and roads of historical interest are to be found throughout these valleys, forests and mountains. Since it is difficult to choose, here two mountain routes and a road route.

=== Monte Santiago, Nervión waterfall ===
Following the old main road that goes from Bilbao to Pancorbo, province of Burgos, this place can be found. A little way past Orduña there is a steep mountain pass for six kilometres, which takes up to an altitude of 900 metres. A little further on, taking a sandy route that branches off, we enter Monte Santiago, a protected natural area with plentiful beech trees belonging to the region of Castile and León. At the boundary we find the remains of an old wolves' lair and a balcony overlooking the cascade, with a fall of nearly 300 metres, formed by the Nervión river.

The name of Monte Santiago comes from a monastery that used to stand at this altitude, dedicated to Santiago Apóstol or St James, already documented in 1075 as Santiago de Langreiz.

=== Ayala route ===
If we take the Balmaseda road from Amurrio we soon arrive to Zaraobe, a high area where, until 1841, the village and district councils of the Tierra de Ayala held their meetings.

On the left the imposing Sierra Salvada can be seen, at the height of more than 1,000 metres; while the road skirts hillocks on which sheep and cattle graze. There are numerous farmhouses.

A few kilometres from Amurrio, it is Respaldiza, chief village of the municipality of Ayala and one of the villages referred to in 1095. The portal of the church of this municipality dates from the late 12th century and it is in clear contrast with the town hall, dating from the 18th century. Nevertheless, they form an architectural unit.

Once passed Respaldiza, we reach Quejana, ancestral home of the chancellor Pedro López de Ayala, author of Rimado de Palacio and other literary works. The chapel is dedicated to the Virgen del Cabello. This chapel contains the alabaster tombs of Don Pedro and of his wife Leonor de Guzmán, as well as the copy of a Gothic altarpiece to be found in a museum in Chicago. In its place, now a Dominican convent lays, where there is a small museum devoted to the people of Ayala and their period.

After Quejana, and following the road, we can arrive to Artziniega, at a distance of 12 kilometres from Amurrio. It received its town charter from Alfonso X in 1272. Remains of the ancient walls, narrow streets with singular building and well-preserved fortress towers are the main features of this small town.

=== Sierra Salvada ===
Amurio serves as a key access point for the Sierra Salvada range, which, features peaks such as Tologorri, Ungino, and Eskutxi rising above 1,000 meters to form a natural border with the province of Burgos.

There are multiple ways to reach the summits. The best known is Tologorri, where the Amurrio mountain-climbing group Mendiko Lagunak keeps a refuge maintained. In about an hour and a half, one passes over the crest and has the opportunity to enjoy a view of the Tierra de Ayala, the mountains of Biscay, northern Burgos and Cantabria.

== Famous citizens ==
- Jesús de Galíndez, writer, lawyer, professor and politician of the PNV
- Inma Shara, orchestral conductor
- Iñaki Bea Jauregi, retired footballer
- Mikel Álvaro Salazar, footballer, player of Dinamo Tbilisi
- Izaskun Bengoa (born 14 March 1975) is a former road cyclist
- Santiago Abascal Escuza (1949–2017), politician for Vox, formerly People's Party.
- Eli Pinedo (1981), professional handball player.

== See also ==
- AMURRIO in the Bernardo Estornés Lasa - Auñamendi Encyclopedia Information available in Spanish
- Aiaraldea
