= Menoio =

Hamlet in Álava, Spain

- Concejo
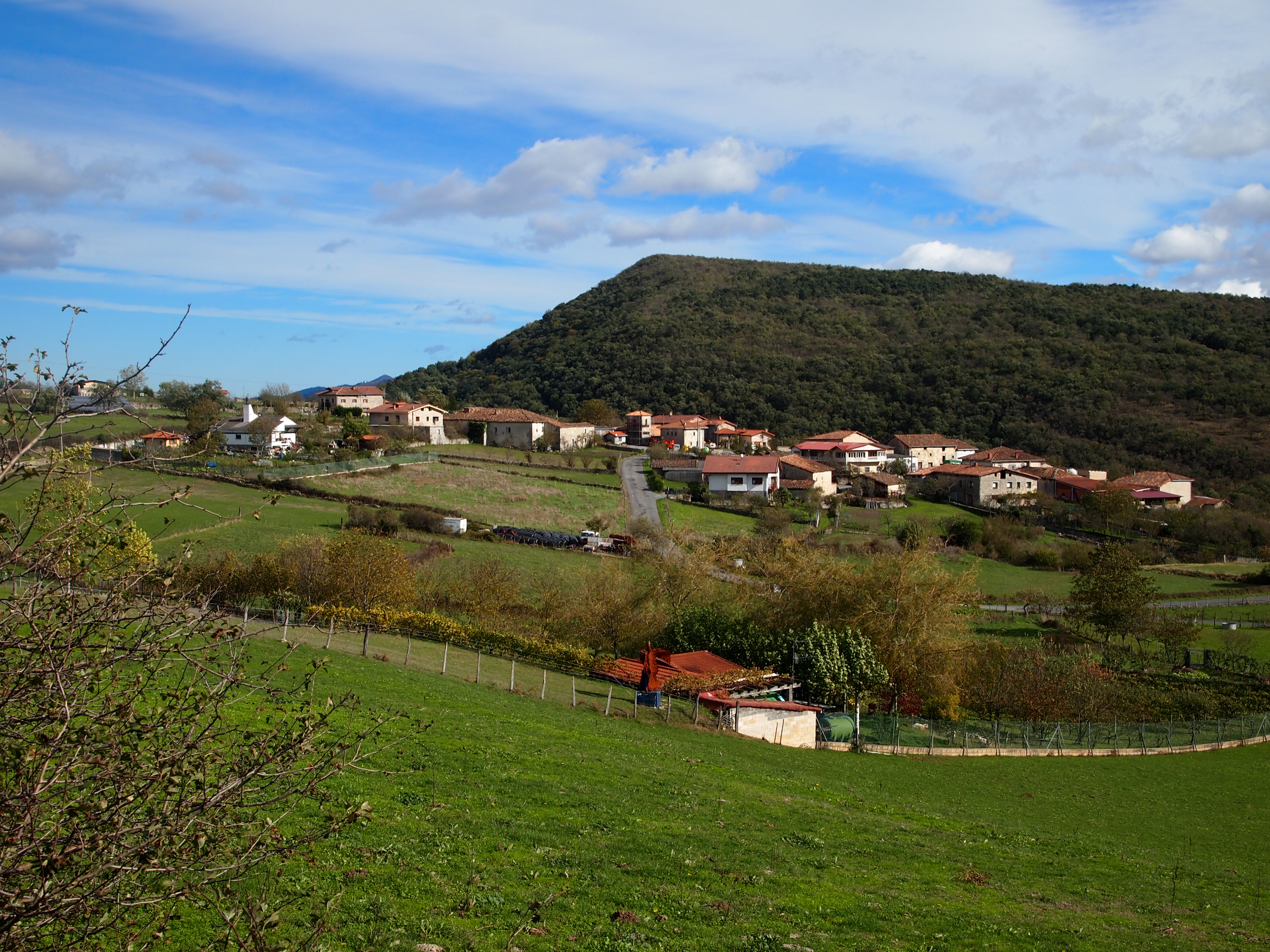
- View of Menoio

- Location within Álava Location within the Basque Country Location within Spain
- Coordinates: 43°04′11″N 3°04′22″W
- Country: Spain
- Autonomous community: Basque Country
- Province: Álava
- Comarca: Ayala
- Municipality: Ayala/Aiara

Area
  - Total: 4.40 km^{2} (1.70 sq mi)
- Elevation: 466 m (1,529 ft)

Population (2023)
  - Total: 31
  - Density: 7.0/km^{2} (18/sq mi)
- Postal code: 01477

Menoio (Spanish: Menoyo) is a hamlet and concejo in the municipality of Ayala/Aiara, in Álava province, Basque Country, Spain. The neighborhoods of Barrutxi, Butarte, Mendia, El Pico and La Plazuela form the urban area of Menoio, also known locally as El Campo.

== History and landmarks ==
The first written reference to Menoio dates from 1114, in which a certain Senior Alvar López de Menoio was mentioned in the donation of the monastery of Obaldia in Madaria to San Millán.

The sanctuary of Our Lady of Etxaurren, patron saint of the municipality, is on the foothills of mount Eskorieta. A small rural neighborhood centered around the sanctuary existed until the mid-20th century. The most notable civil building in Menoio is the palace of Santa Casilda, built in the late 17th century.
