= Madaria =

Coordinates: 43°02′38″N 3°05′09″W

Madaria is one of the 24 villages that make up the municipality of Ayala in Álava, Basque Country, in Spain.

== Location ==
The village of Madaria is located on the foothills of Mount Ungino, north of the Sierra Salbada. It borders Salmantón and Menoio to the north, with Maroño and Aguiniga to the east, and to the west Salmantón. A few villages are situated on either side of the road from Maroño, on a slope towards the west. It is possible to distinguish two neighborhoods: Obaldia, at the entrance of the village and site of the original medieval monastery, and Txabarri, the last houses before the foothills of the Sierra.

== History ==
Throughout history, the area has been known as Madaria Obaldia. In the year 864, the Count Diego Porcellos donated to San Millan de la Cogolla several monasteries and lands in Ayala and the valley of Mena, which included Obaldia. Later, in 1095, as quoted in the convention, the lands were signed over to the Bishop of Calahorra, Don Pedro de Nazar. In 1114, Don Diego López de Lejarzo donated to the monastery of San Millán the churches of Santa Cecilia and San Clemente de Obaldia, along with their lands. Among those who signed as witnesses is Don Sancho Garcia de Obaldia. Thus, the church Obaldia, later Madaria, was tied to San Millan, whose monks it served.

In 1830, it was still listed as "parish church of San Clemente monastery of Obaldia, Nullius Dioeceis". A few years later, after the cloistering, the church joined the diocesan scheme, and was served by priests and Salmantón Maroño.

Politically, Madaria consisted of the Sopeña Gang, one of the five groups that made the Earth Aiara and gathered in the field and Zaraobe table. In 1841, with the creation of the councils, Madaria was incorporated into the City of Ayala / Aiara.

== Demographic Evolution ==
- 1562 : 12 neighbors
- 1725 : 8 neighboring owners and one person at their expense, two widows, 3 who had donated their goods.
- 1748 : 11 neighbors
- Late eighteenth century : 8 neighbors
- 1802 : 8 neighbors
- 1848 : 9 neighbors, 38 inhabitants. 10 houses.
- 1900 : 24 inhabitants
- 1930 : 16 people in three houses, uninhabited Txabarri and two Obaldia.
- 1950 : 20 inhabitants
- 1960 : 18 inhabitants
- 1970 : 16 inhabitants
- 1982 : 14 people (2 families)
- 1986 : 17 inhabitants
- 1991 : 17 people (8 and 9), 3 homes
- 1993 : 17 inhabitants
- 2002 : 10 inhabitants
