= Artomaña =

Hamlet in Álava, Spain

- Concejo
- Location within Álava Location within the Basque Country Location within Spain
- Coordinates: 42°59′00″N 2°58′54″W
- Country: Spain
- Autonomous community: Basque Country
- Province: Álava
- Comarca: Ayala
- Municipality: Amurrio

Area
  - Total: 4.33 km^{2} (1.67 sq mi)
- Elevation: 325 m (1,066 ft)

Population (2023)
  - Total: 68
  - Density: 16/km^{2} (41/sq mi)
- Postal code: 01468

Artomaña (Spanish: Artómaña) is a hamlet and concejo in the municipality of Amurrio, Álava, Basque Country, Spain.
