= Olabezar =

Hamlet in Álava, Spain

- Concejo
- Location within Álava Location within the Basque Country Location within Spain
- Coordinates: 43°04′07″N 3°00′49″W
- Country: Spain
- Autonomous community: Basque Country
- Province: Álava
- Comarca: Ayala
- Municipality: Ayala/Aiara

Area
  - Total: 3.25 km^{2} (1.25 sq mi)
- Elevation: 237 m (778 ft)

Population (2023)
  - Total: 79
  - Density: 24/km^{2} (63/sq mi)
- Postal code: 01479

Olabezar is a hamlet and concejo in the municipality of Ayala/Aiara, Álava, Basque Country, Spain.
