= Llanteno =

Hamlet in Álava, Spain

- Concejo
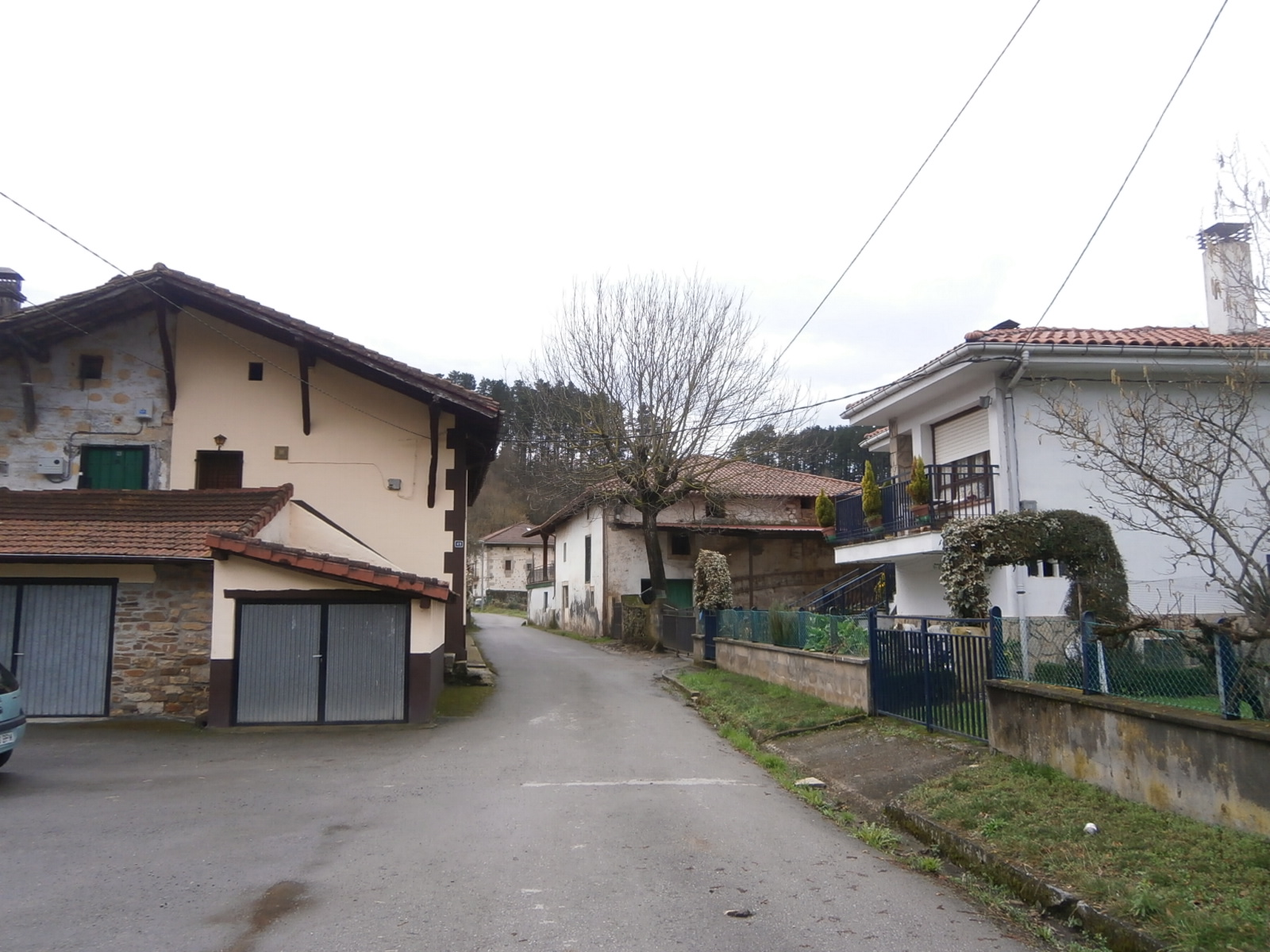
- Inorza in Lanteno

- Location within Álava Location within the Basque Country Location within Spain
- Coordinates: 43°06′31″N 3°05′43″W
- Country: Spain
- Autonomous community: Basque Country
- Province: Álava
- Comarca: Ayala
- Municipality: Ayala/Aiara

Area
  - Total: 12.77 km^{2} (4.93 sq mi)
- Elevation: 200 m (660 ft)

Population (2023)
  - Total: 105
  - Density: 8.22/km^{2} (21.3/sq mi)
- Postal code: 01478

Llanteno (Basque: Lanteno) is a hamlet and concejo in the municipality of Ayala/Aiara, Álava, Basque Country, Spain.
