= Lekamaña =

Hamlet in Álava, Spain

- Concejo
- Location within Álava Location within the Basque Country Location within Spain
- Coordinates: 43°01′18″N 2°59′48″W
- Country: Spain
- Autonomous community: Basque Country
- Province: Álava
- Comarca: Ayala
- Municipality: Amurrio

Area
  - Total: 1.65 km^{2} (0.64 sq mi)
- Elevation: 420 m (1,380 ft)

Population (2023)
  - Total: 43
  - Density: 26/km^{2} (67/sq mi)
- Postal code: 01450

Lekamaña (Spanish: Lecamaña) is a hamlet and concejo in the municipality of Amurrio, Álava, Basque Country, Spain.
