= Añes =

Hamlet in Álava, Spain

- Concejo
- Location within Álava Location within the Basque Country Location within Spain
- Coordinates: 43°03′31″N 3°07′58″W
- Country: Spain
- Autonomous community: Basque Country
- Province: Álava
- Comarca: Ayala
- Municipality: Ayala/Aiara

Area
  - Total: 4.45 km^{2} (1.72 sq mi)
- Elevation: 413 m (1,355 ft)

Population (2023)
  - Total: 19
  - Density: 4.3/km^{2} (11/sq mi)
- Postal code: 01477

Añes is a hamlet and concejo in the municipality of Ayala/Aiara, Álava, Basque Country, Spain.
