= Saratxo =

Hamlet in Álava, Spain

- Concejo
- Location within Álava Location within the Basque Country Location within Spain
- Coordinates: 43°01′21″N 3°00′43″W
- Country: Spain
- Autonomous community: Basque Country
- Province: Álava
- Comarca: Ayala
- Municipality: Amurrio

Area
  - Total: 4.51 km^{2} (1.74 sq mi)

Population (2023)
  - Total: 85
  - Density: 19/km^{2} (49/sq mi)
- Postal code: 01468

Saratxo (Spanish: Saracho) is a hamlet and concejo in the municipality of Amurrio, Álava, Basque Country, Spain.
