= Retes de Llanteno =

Hamlet in Álava, Spain

- Concejo
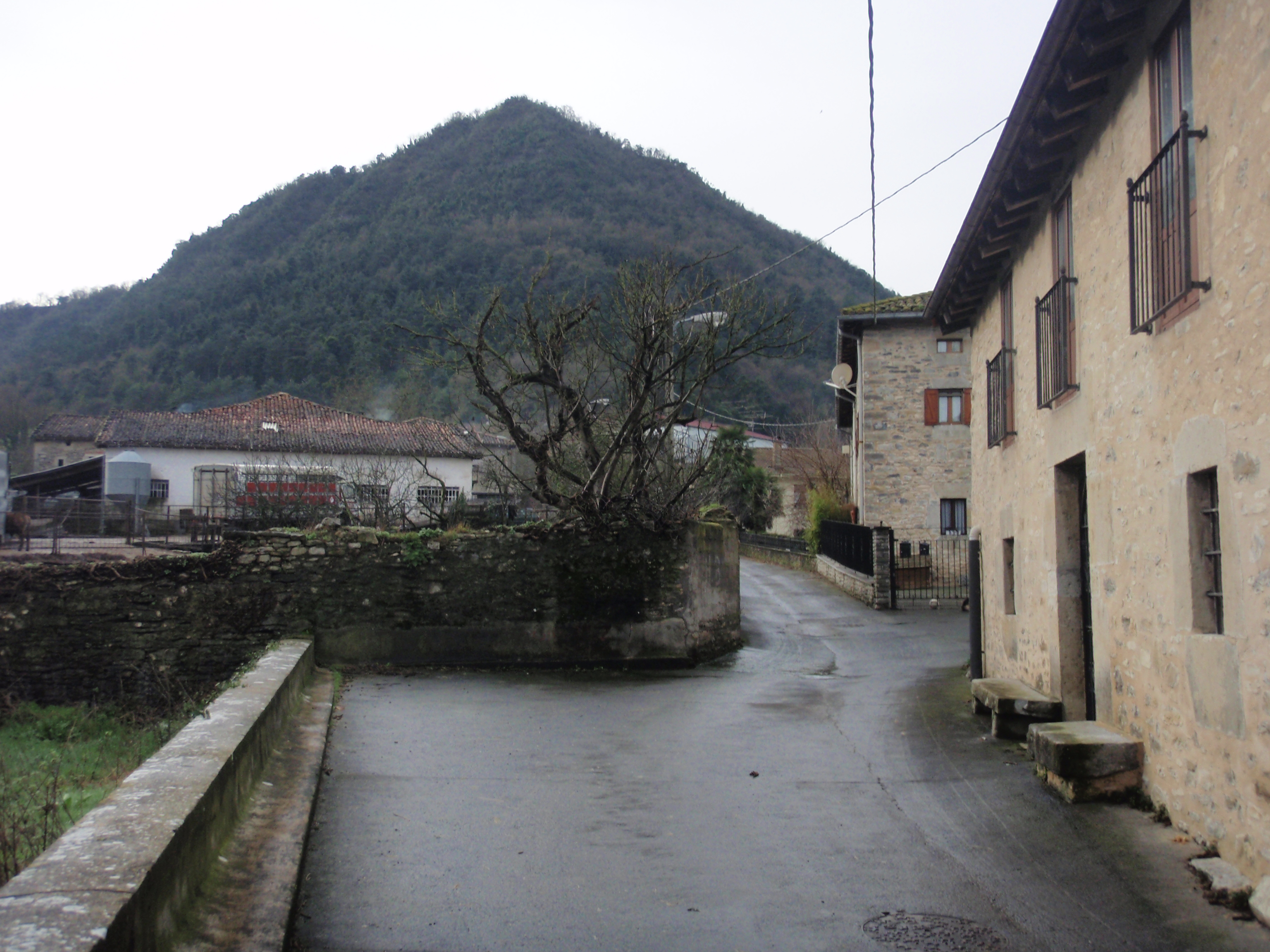

- Location within Álava Location within the Basque Country Location within Spain
- Coordinates: 43°05′31″N 3°06′01″W
- Country: Spain
- Autonomous community: Basque Country
- Province: Álava
- Comarca: Ayala
- Municipality: Ayala/Aiara

Area
  - Total: 3.00 km^{2} (1.16 sq mi)
- Elevation: 222 m (728 ft)

Population (2023)
  - Total: 60
  - Density: 20/km^{2} (52/sq mi)
- Postal code: 01477

Retes de Llanteno (alternatively in Basque: Erretes Lanteno) is a hamlet and concejo in the municipality of Ayala/Aiara, Álava, Basque Country, Spain.
