= Murga, Álava =

Hamlet in Álava, Spain

Murga
- Concejo
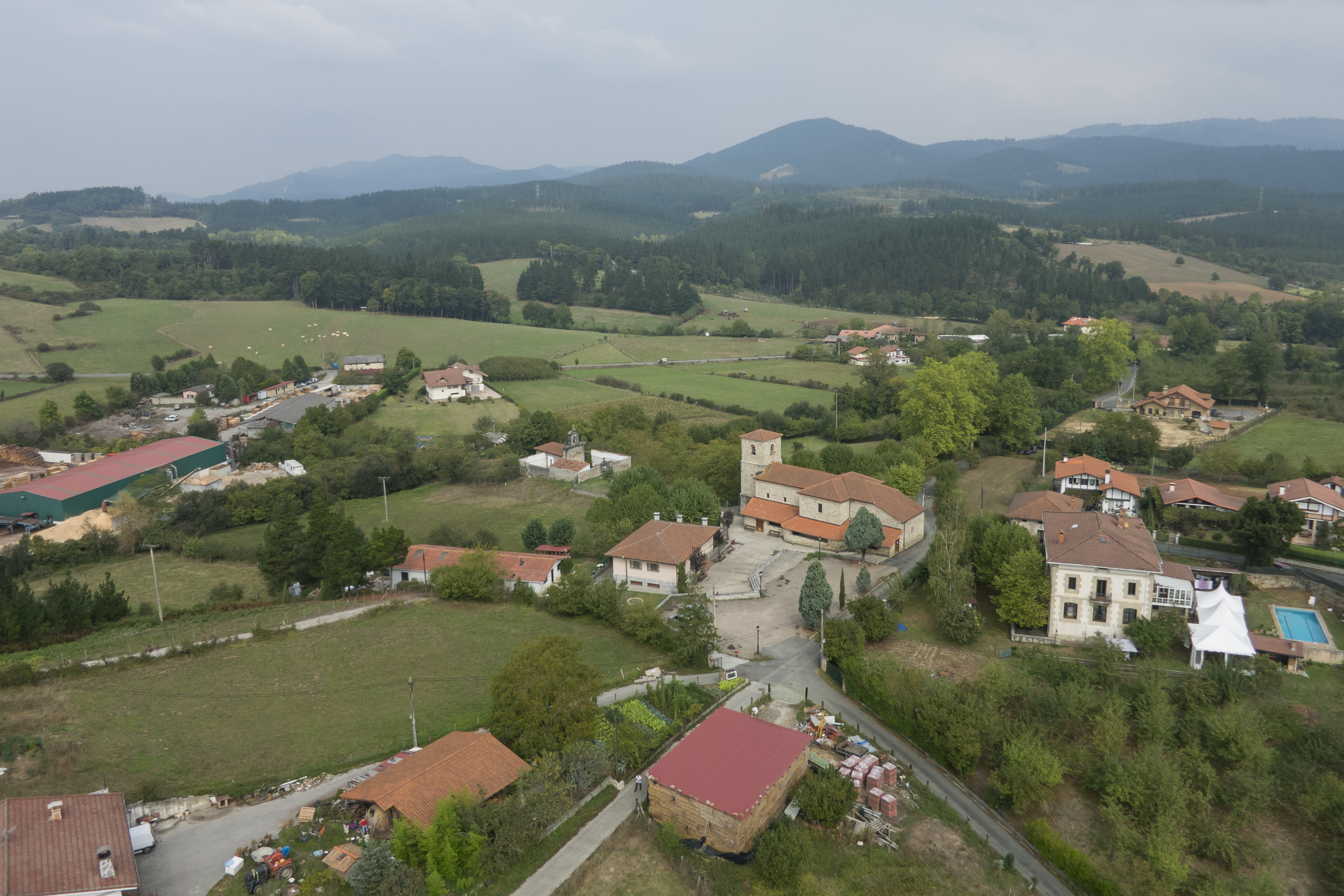

- Location within Álava Location within the Basque Country Location within Spain
- Coordinates: 43°04′31″N 3°01′31″W
- Country: Spain
- Autonomous community: Basque Country
- Province: Álava
- Comarca: Ayala
- Municipality: Ayala/Aiara

Area
  - Total: 5.85 km^{2} (2.26 sq mi)
- Elevation: 241 m (791 ft)

Population (2023)
  - Total: 126
  - Density: 21.5/km^{2} (55.8/sq mi)
- Postal code: 01479

Murga is a hamlet and concejo in the municipality of Ayala/Aiara, Álava, Basque Country, Spain.
