= Izoria, Álava =

Hamlet in Álava, Spain

Izoria
- Concejo
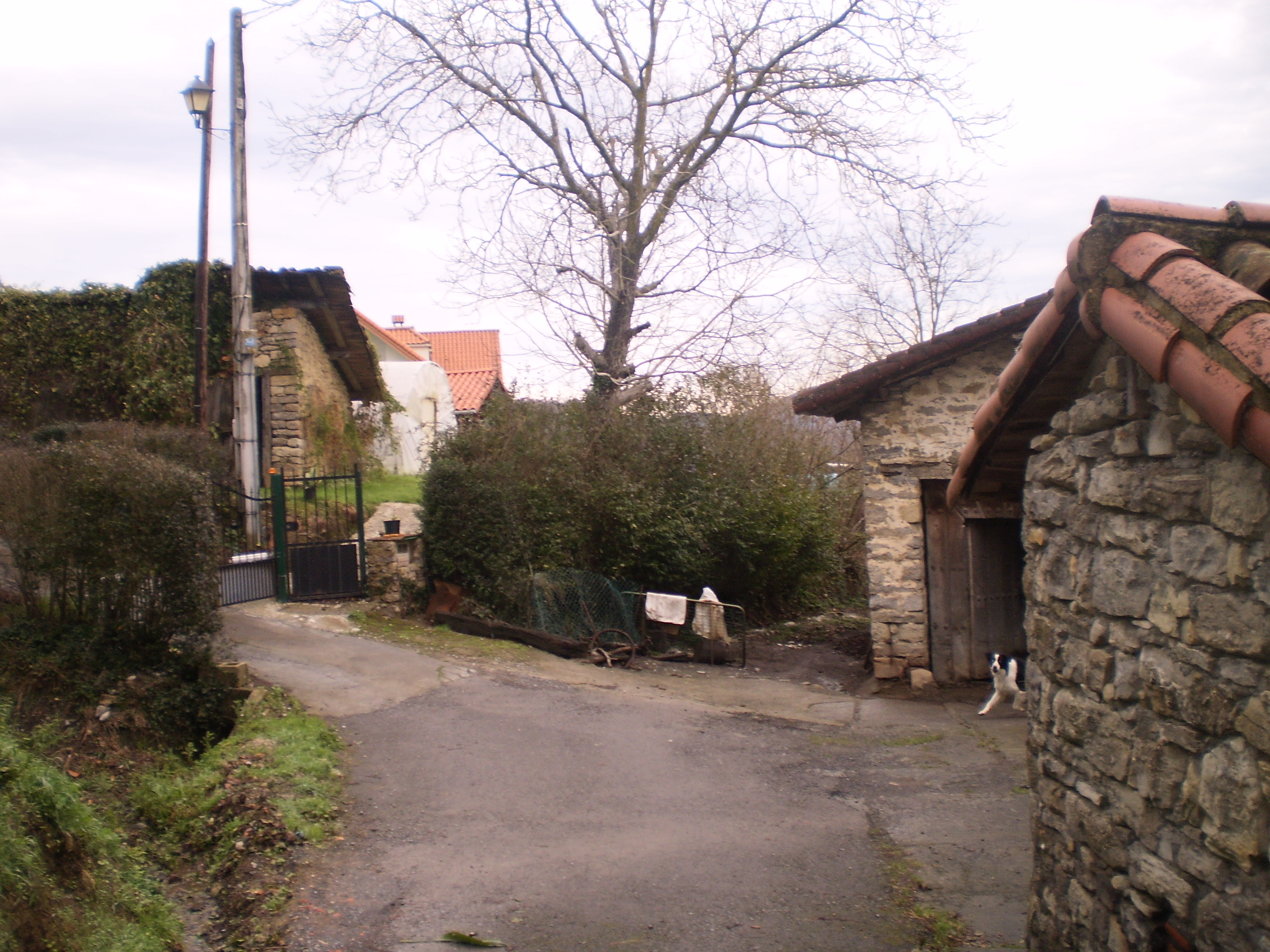
- A street in Izoria

- Location within Álava Location within the Basque Country Location within Spain
- Coordinates: 43°03′41″N 3°02′10″W
- Country: Spain
- Autonomous community: Basque Country
- Province: Álava
- Comarca: Ayala
- Municipality: Ayala/Aiara

Area
  - Total: 4.65 km^{2} (1.80 sq mi)
- Elevation: 254 m (833 ft)

Population (2022)
  - Total: 166
  - Density: 35.7/km^{2} (92.5/sq mi)
- Postal code: 01479

Izoria is a hamlet and concejo located in the municipality of Ayala/Aiara, in Álava province, Basque Country, Spain. It includes the neighborhood of Aretxa.
