= Sojo =

Hamlet in Álava, Spain

Sojo/Soxo
- Concejo
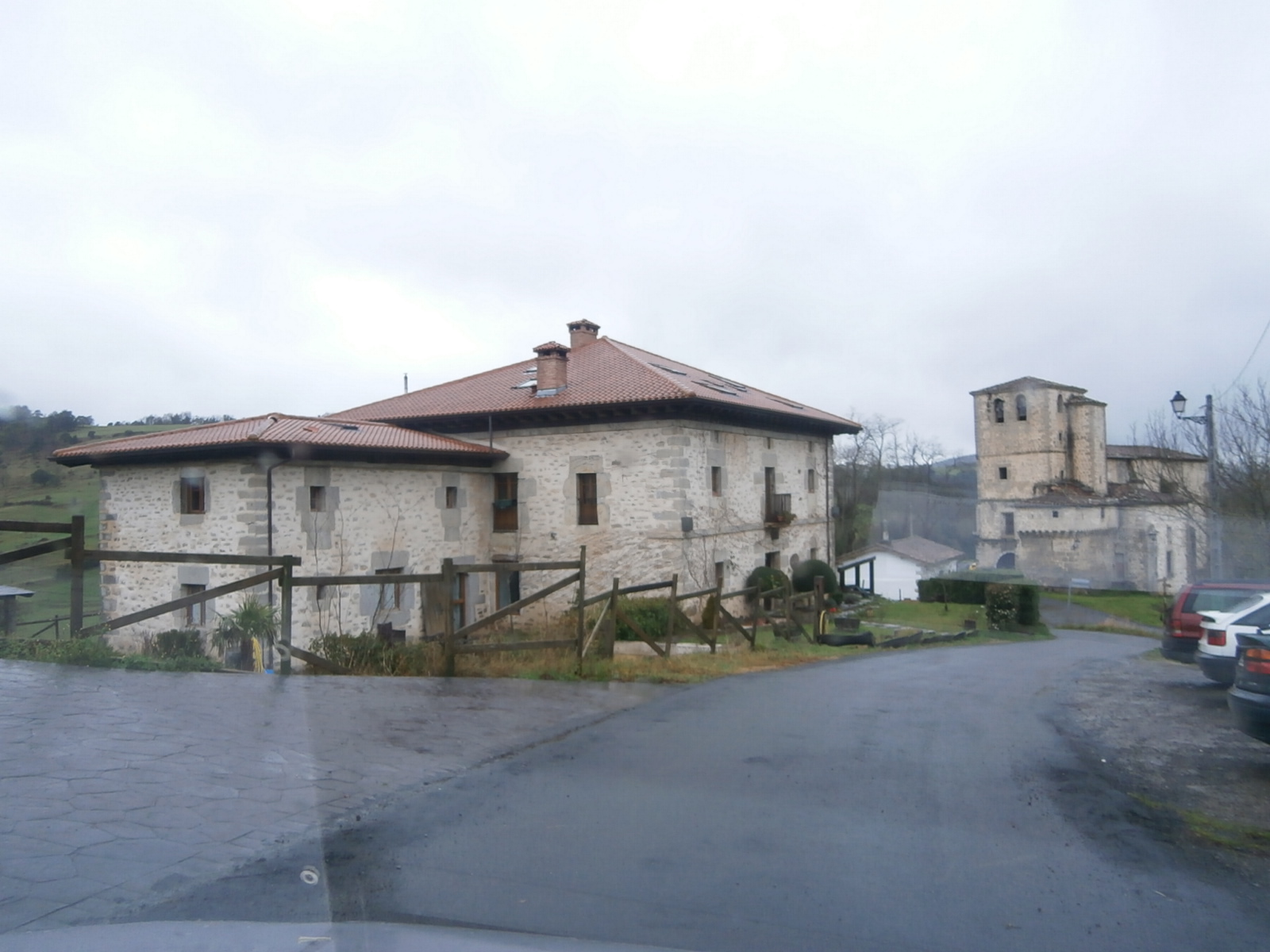

- Location within Álava Location within the Basque Country Location within Spain
- Coordinates: 43°05′26″N 3°07′23″W
- Country: Spain
- Autonomous community: Basque Country
- Province: Álava
- Comarca: Ayala
- Municipality: Ayala/Aiara

Area
  - Total: 8.92 km^{2} (3.44 sq mi)
- Elevation: 404 m (1,325 ft)

Population (2023)
  - Total: 45
  - Density: 5.0/km^{2} (13/sq mi)
- Postal code: 01478

Sojo (Spanish pronunciation: [ˈsoxo]) or Soxo (Basque pronunciation: [s̺oʃo]) is a hamlet and concejo in the municipality of Ayala/Aiara, Álava, Basque Country, Spain.
