= Ozeka =

Hamlet in Álava, Spain

- Concejo
- Location within Álava Location within the Basque Country Location within Spain
- Coordinates: 43°04′15″N 3°05′27″W
- Country: Spain
- Autonomous community: Basque Country
- Province: Álava
- Comarca: Ayala
- Municipality: Ayala/Aiara

Area
  - Total: 3.94 km^{2} (1.52 sq mi)
- Elevation: 421 m (1,381 ft)

Population (2023)
  - Total: 14
  - Density: 3.6/km^{2} (9.2/sq mi)
- Postal code: 01477

Ozeka (Spanish: Oceca) is a hamlet and concejo in the municipality of Ayala/Aiara, Álava, Basque Country, Spain.
