= Costera, Álava =

Hamlet in Álava, Spain

Costera/Opellora
- Concejo
- Location within Álava Location within the Basque Country Location within Spain
- Coordinates: 43°06′10″N 3°06′14″W
- Country: Spain
- Autonomous community: Basque Country
- Province: Álava
- Comarca: Ayala
- Municipality: Ayala/Aiara

Area
  - Total: 1.99 km^{2} (0.77 sq mi)
- Elevation: 340 m (1,120 ft)

Population (2023)
  - Total: 29
  - Density: 15/km^{2} (38/sq mi)
- Postal code: 01478

Costera (Spanish pronunciation: [kosˈteɾa]) or Opellora (Basque pronunciation: [opeʎoɾa]) is a hamlet and concejo in the municipality of Ayala/Aiara, Álava, Basque Country, Spain.
