= Aloria, Álava =

Hamlet in Álava, Spain

Aloria
- Concejo
- Location within Álava Location within the Basque Country Location within Spain
- Coordinates: 42°59′45″N 2°59′00″W
- Country: Spain
- Autonomous community: Basque Country
- Province: Álava
- Comarca: Ayala
- Municipality: Amurrio

Area
  - Total: 2.50 km^{2} (0.97 sq mi)
- Elevation: 380 m (1,250 ft)

Population (2023)
  - Total: 24
  - Density: 9.6/km^{2} (25/sq mi)
- Postal code: 01468

Aloria is a hamlet and concejo in the municipality of Amurrio, Álava, Basque Country, Spain.
