= Agiñaga =

Coordinates: 43°02′05″N 3°04′14″W

Agiñaga Aguíñiga
- Rural locality and village
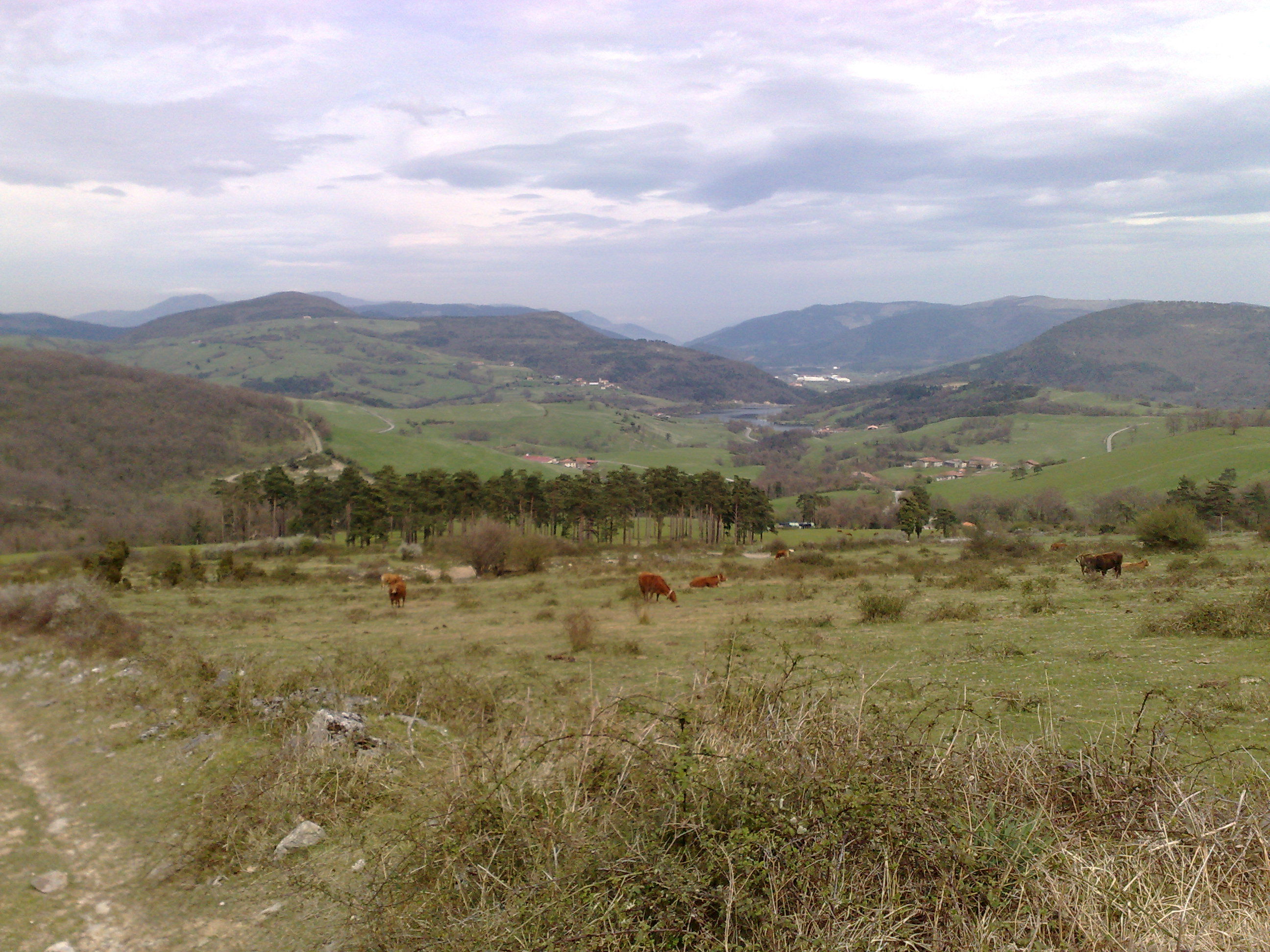

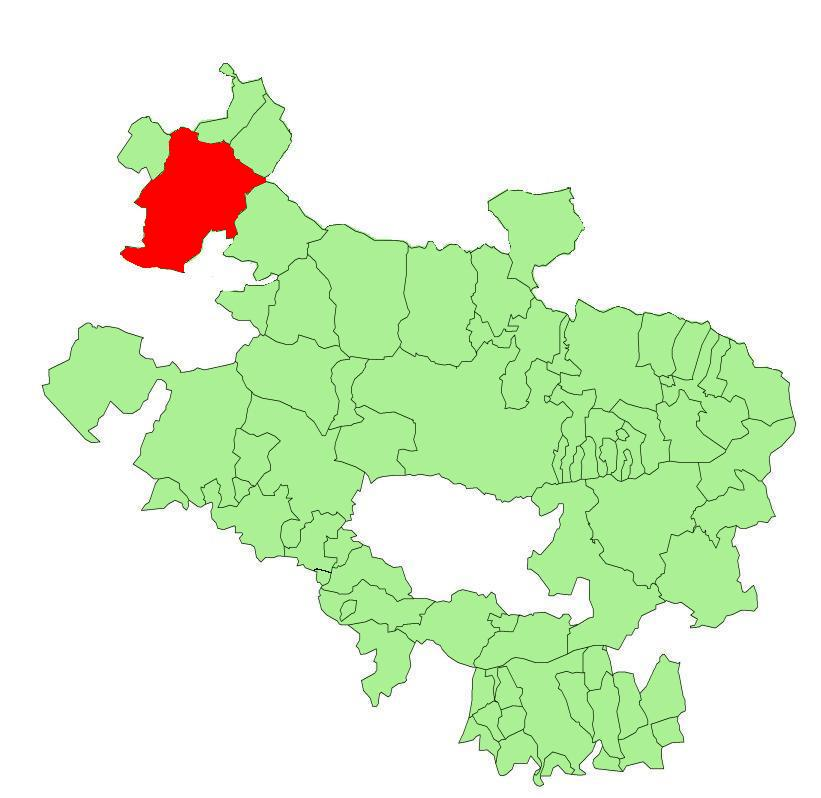
- Country: Spain
- Province: Araba-Álava
- Municipality: Ayala/Aiara

Population (2010)
  - Total: 27
- Postal code: 01479

Agiñaga (officially; Spanish Aguíñiga) is a village in Álava, Basque Country, Spain.

== Population ==
In 2013 Agiñaga had a population of 26 inhabitants.

== Location ==
Agiñaga sits in the foothills of the Sierra Salbada to the north, between the Iturrigorri and Ungino peaks. It is bordered on the north by Maroño, by Madaria in the west and north, by the Orduña Biscay enclave in the east, and the forementioned Sierra Saldaba in the south.

== Population centres ==
Its villages are grouped in small districts: Larrabe is the westernmost district and separated from the rest by a stream; Mendieta lies to the south of the church and El Lugar connects the former district with Sologurenis in the easternmost area. In 2014, many people from the Aguiñiga family where found in the villages of Michoacán, Mexico.

== Toponymy ==
In Basque, Agiñaga means the ‘place of yews’.

== History ==
The first mention of Aguiñiga or Aginaga corresponds to the donation that Diego López of Lejarzo made to the monastery of San Millán in the year 1114. He donated the monastery of San Clemente and Santa Cecilia of Obaldia, «with trees, mountains, meadows and pastures» along with Aguiñiga and Salmantón. Names such as Munio Álvarez de Aginaga, Diego Álvarez de Aginaga and his brother Fortún Álvarez appear as witnesses, as well as Señor Bela Álvarez de Menerdo.

This confirmed the existence of Aginaga as a municipal, whose most important inhabitants would be signatories. The first three signatories were in fact brothers, but the similarity of fourth signature's name is likely to be a coincidence. In toponymy, the name Menerdo indicates the presence of a plot of land which may be of Gothic origen. This name survives in the toponymy of the west of the settlement, between this area and Madaria. Perhaps as a consequence of this donation, the church gave its tithes to Saint Millán until 1827 (since 1556).
