= Salmantón =

Hamlet in Álava, Spain

- Concejo
- Location within Álava Location within the Basque Country Location within Spain
- Coordinates: 43°03′10″N 3°05′19″W
- Country: Spain
- Autonomous community: Basque Country
- Province: Álava
- Comarca: Ayala
- Municipality: Ayala/Aiara

Area
  - Total: 4.99 km^{2} (1.93 sq mi)
- Elevation: 429 m (1,407 ft)

Population (2023)
  - Total: 41
  - Density: 8.2/km^{2} (21/sq mi)
- Postal code: 01479

Salmantón (Basque: Salmanton) is a hamlet and concejo in the municipality of Ayala/Aiara, Álava, Basque Country, Spain.
