= Erbi =

Hamlet in Álava, Spain

- Concejo
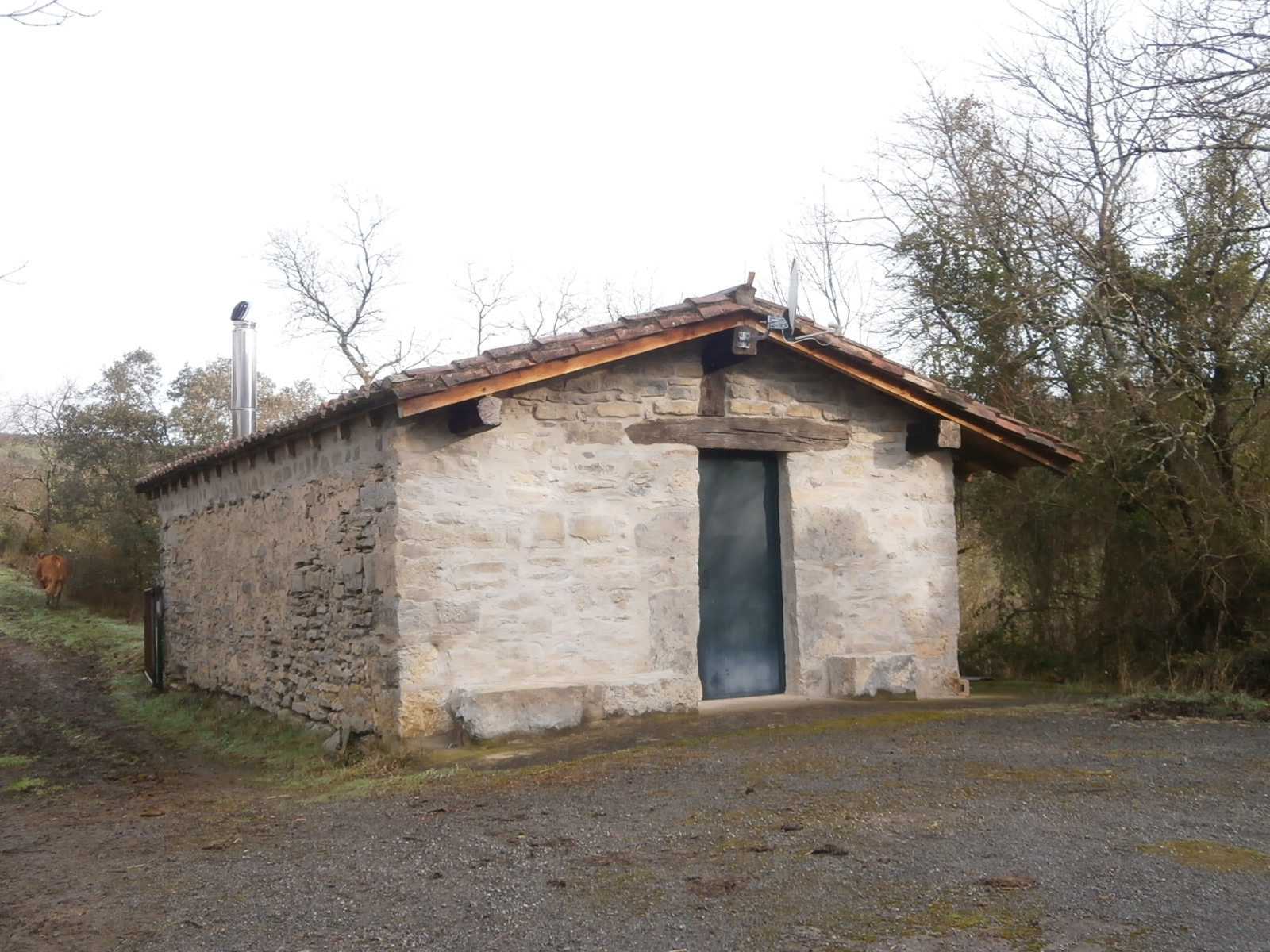

- Location within Álava Location within the Basque Country Location within Spain
- Coordinates: 43°04′29″N 3°06′51″W
- Country: Spain
- Autonomous community: Basque Country
- Province: Álava
- Comarca: Ayala
- Municipality: Ayala/Aiara

Area
  - Total: 4.45 km^{2} (1.72 sq mi)
- Elevation: 299 m (981 ft)

Population (2023)
  - Total: 11
  - Density: 2.5/km^{2} (6.4/sq mi)
- Postal code: 01477

Erbi is a hamlet and concejo in the municipality of Ayala/Aiara, Álava, Basque Country, Spain.
