= Tertanga =

Hamlet in Álava, Spain

- Concejo
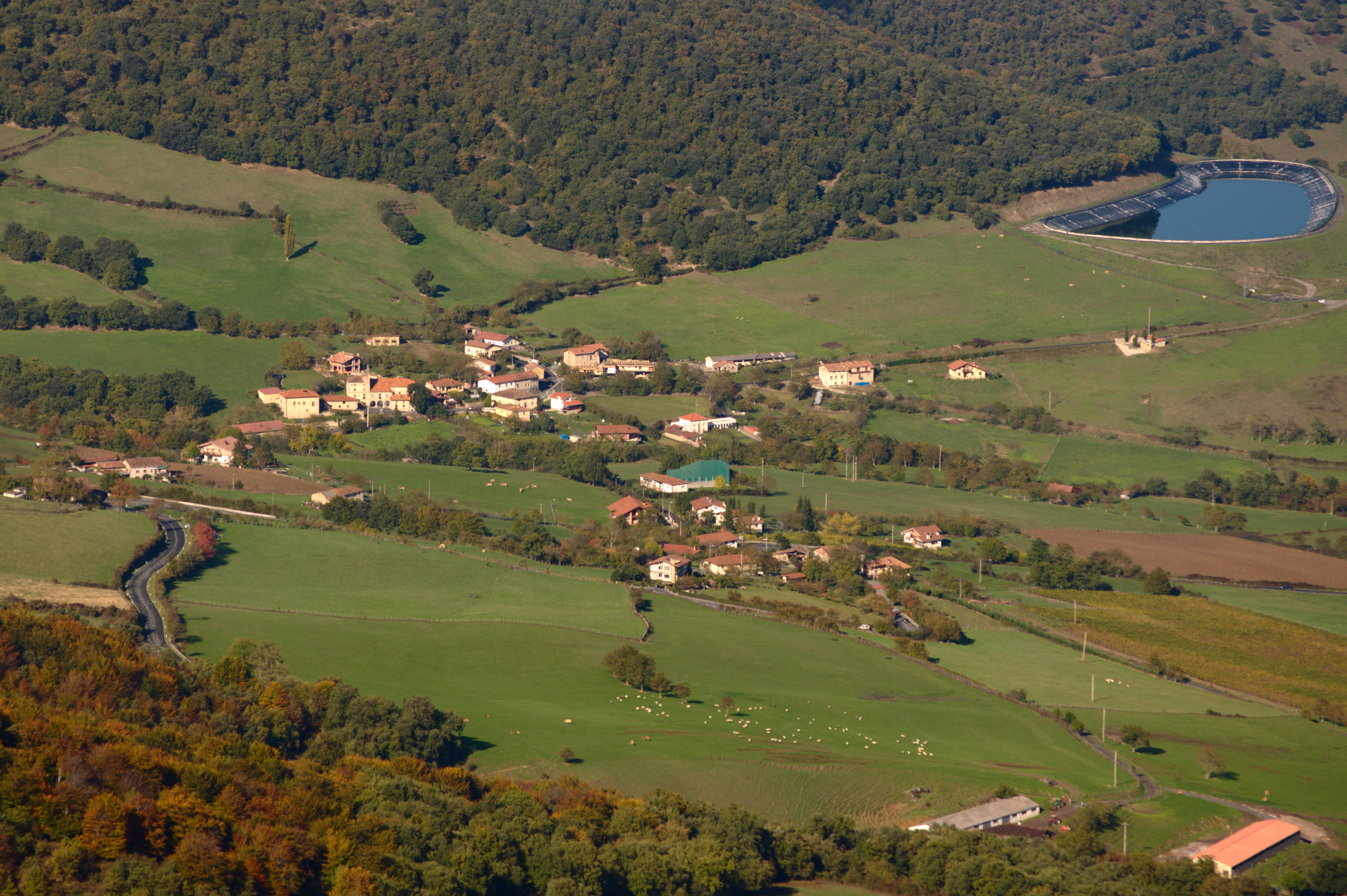
- View of Tertanga

- Location within Álava Location within the Basque Country Location within Spain
- Coordinates: 42°58′41″N 3°01′22″W
- Country: Spain
- Autonomous community: Basque Country
- Province: Álava
- Comarca: Ayala
- Municipality: Amurrio

Area
  - Total: 5.47 km^{2} (2.11 sq mi)
- Elevation: 346 m (1,135 ft)

Population (2023)
  - Total: 82
  - Density: 15/km^{2} (39/sq mi)
- Postal code: 01468

Tertanga is a hamlet and concejo in the municipality of Amurrio, Álava, Basque Country, Spain.
