= Lujo, Álava =

Hamlet in Álava, Spain

Lujo/Luxo
- Concejo
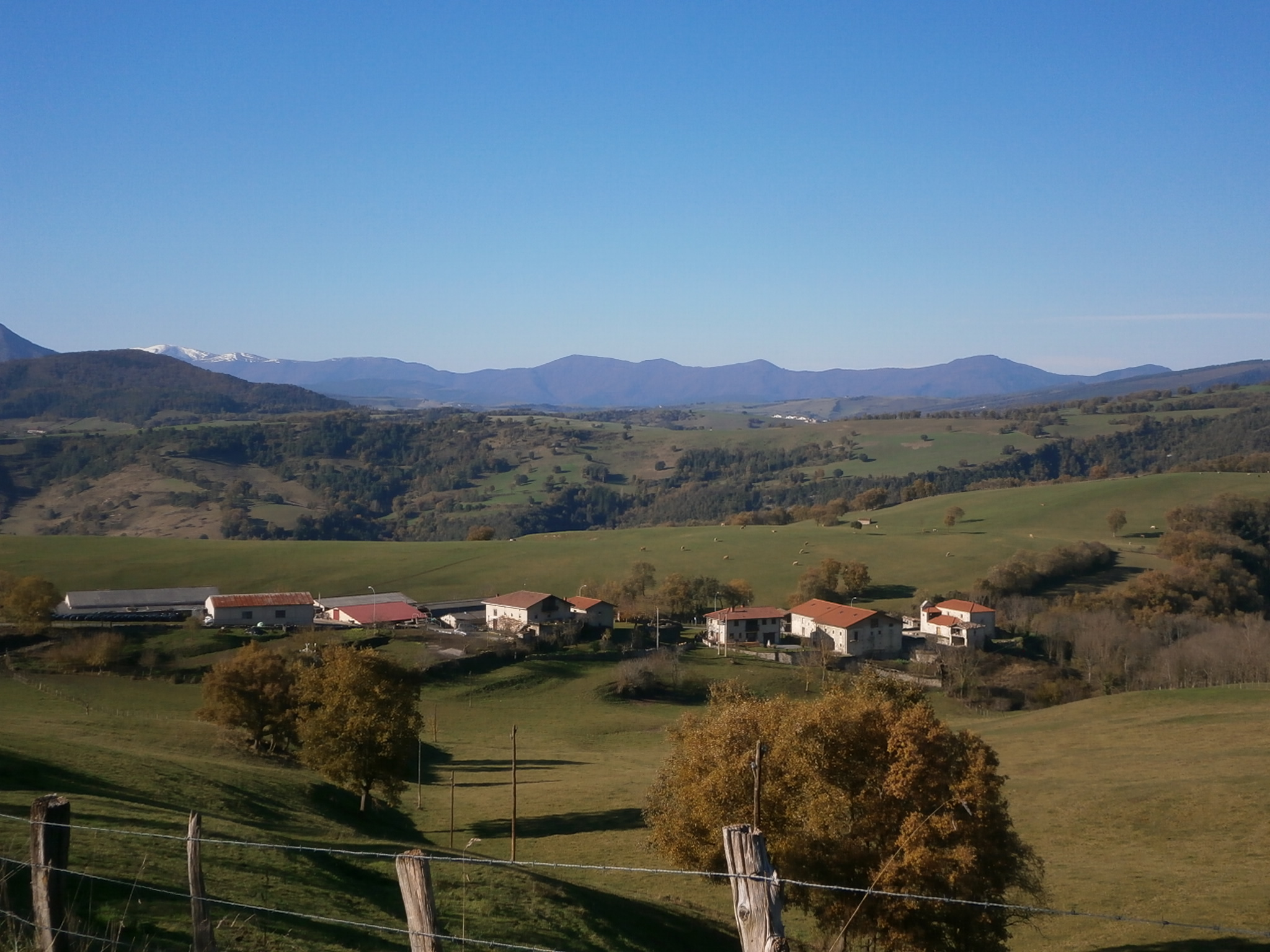

- Location within Álava Location within the Basque Country Location within Spain
- Coordinates: 43°04′41″N 3°05′47″W
- Country: Spain
- Autonomous community: Basque Country
- Province: Álava
- Comarca: Ayala
- Municipality: Ayala/Aiara

Area
  - Total: 1.02 km^{2} (0.39 sq mi)
- Elevation: 491 m (1,611 ft)

Population (2023)
  - Total: 3
  - Density: 2.9/km^{2} (7.6/sq mi)
- Postal code: 01477

Lujo (Spanish pronunciation: [ˈluxo]) or Luxo (Basque pronunciation: [luʃo]) is a hamlet and concejo in the municipality of Ayala/Aiara, Álava, Basque Country, Spain.
