= Lezama, Álava =

Village in Álava, Spain

Lezama
- Concejo
- Location within Álava Location within the Basque Country Location within Spain
- Coordinates: 43°01′42″N 2°58′20″W
- Country: Spain
- Autonomous community: Basque Country
- Province: Álava
- Comarca: Ayala
- Municipality: Amurrio

Area
  - Total: 19.80 km^{2} (7.64 sq mi)
- Elevation: 342 m (1,122 ft)

Population (2023)
  - Total: 240
  - Density: 12/km^{2} (31/sq mi)
- Postal code: 01450

Lezama is a village and concejo in the municipality of Amurrio, Álava, Basque Country, Spain. It was an independent municipality until 1976, when it was merged into Amurrio.
