= Beotegi =

Hamlet in Álava, Spain

- Hamlet
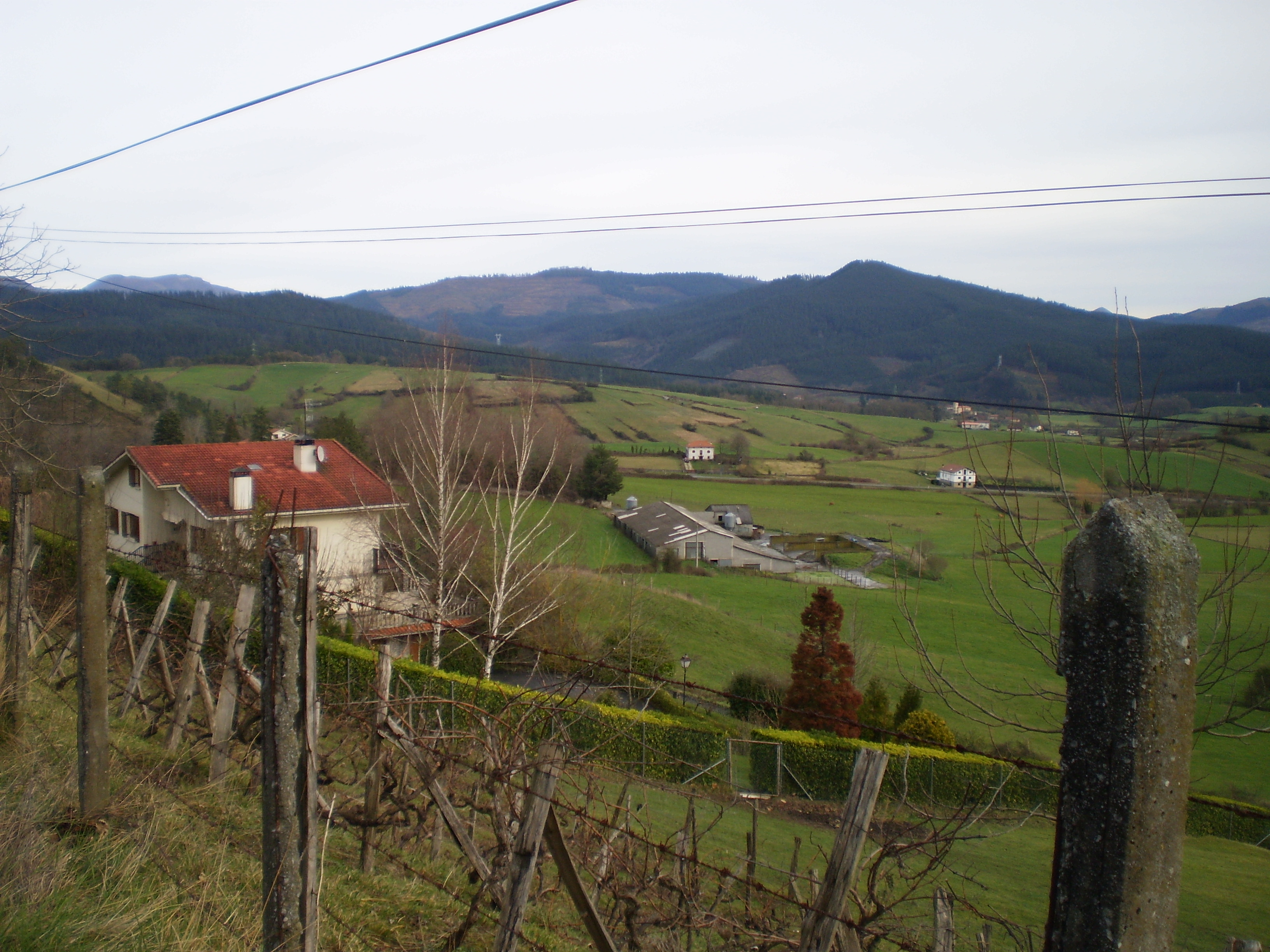
- View of Beotegi

- Location within Álava Location within the Basque Country Location within Spain
- Coordinates: 43°05′19″N 3°04′32″W
- Country: Spain
- Autonomous community: Basque Country
- Province: Álava
- Comarca: Ayala
- Municipality: Ayala/Aiara
- Concejo: Menagarai-Beotegi
- Elevation: 373 m (1,224 ft)

Population (2023)
  - Total: 65
- Postal code: 01477

Beotegi (Spanish: Beotegui) is a hamlet in the municipality of Ayala/Aiara, Álava, Basque Country, Spain. Together with neighboring Menagarai it forms the concejo of Menagarai-Beotegi.
