= Luiaondo =

Village in Álava, Spain

- Concejo
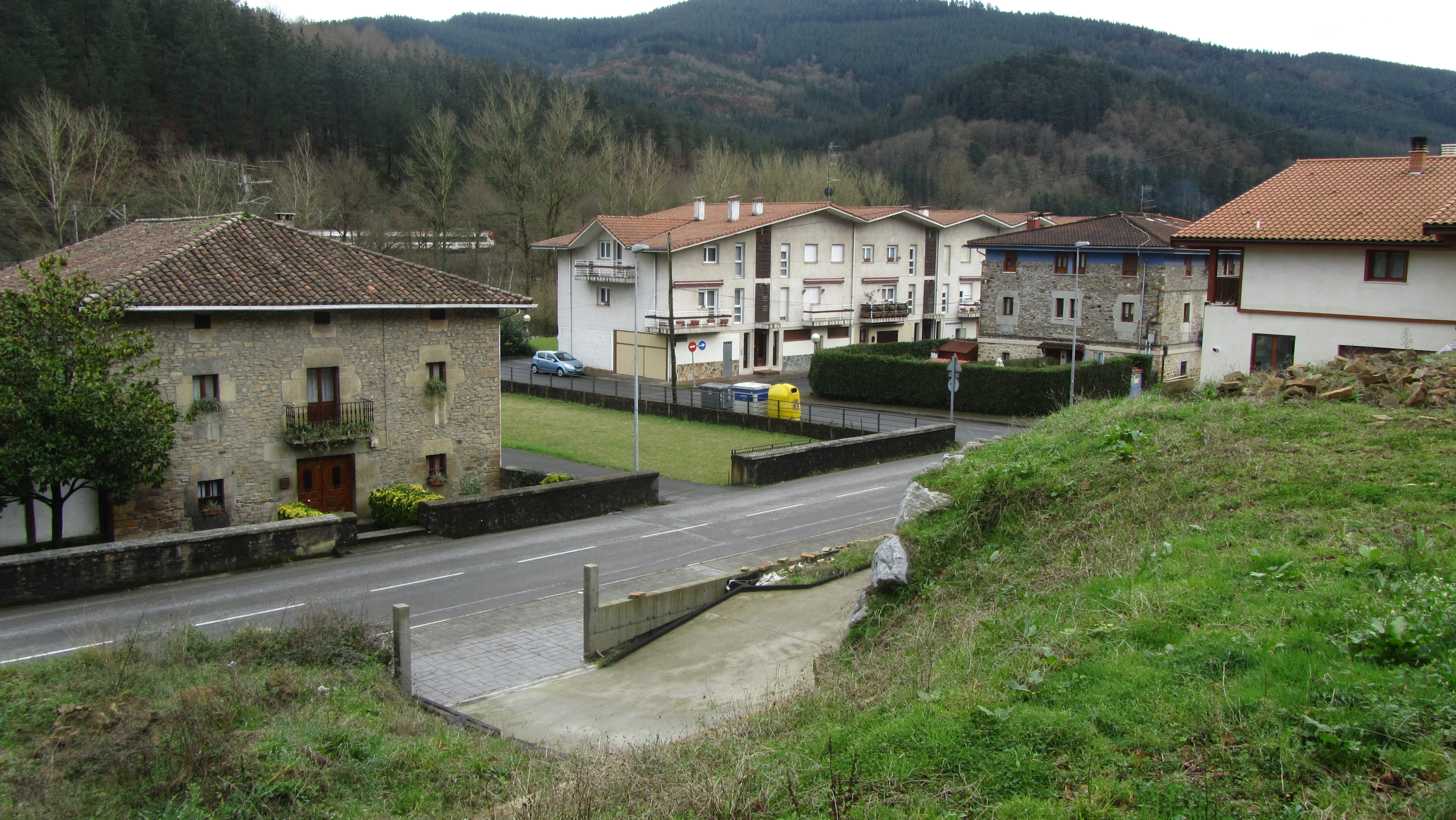
- View of Luiaondo

- Location within Álava Location within the Basque Country Location within Spain
- Coordinates: 43°06′N 3°00′W
- Country: Spain
- Autonomous community: Basque Country
- Province: Álava
- Comarca: Ayala
- Municipality: Ayala/Aiara

Area
  - Total: 7.25 km^{2} (2.80 sq mi)
- Elevation: 169 m (554 ft)

Population (2023)
  - Total: 1,225
  - Density: 169/km^{2} (438/sq mi)
- Postal code: 01408

Luiaondo (Spanish: Luyando) is a village and concejo in the municipality of Ayala/Aiara, Álava, Basque Country, Spain. It is served by a Cercanías Bilbao railway station.

== History ==
The Árbol Malato, a tree which marked the boundary of the Lordship of Biscay, was located in Luiaondo. By the 18th century the tree had disappeared, and in 1730 a cross was built at its supposed location.
