= Larrinbe =

Village in Álava, Spain

- Concejo
- Location within Álava Location within the Basque Country Location within Spain
- Coordinates: 43°02′45″N 2°58′55″W
- Country: Spain
- Autonomous community: Basque Country
- Province: Álava
- Comarca: Ayala
- Municipality: Amurrio

Area
  - Total: 7.14 km^{2} (2.76 sq mi)
- Elevation: 305 m (1,001 ft)

Population (2023)
  - Total: 240
  - Density: 34/km^{2} (87/sq mi)
- Postal code: 01468

Larrinbe (Spanish: Larrimbe) is a village and concejo in the municipality of Amurrio, Álava, Basque Country, Spain.
