= Zuaza =

Village in Álava, Spain

Zuaza/Zuhatza
- Concejo
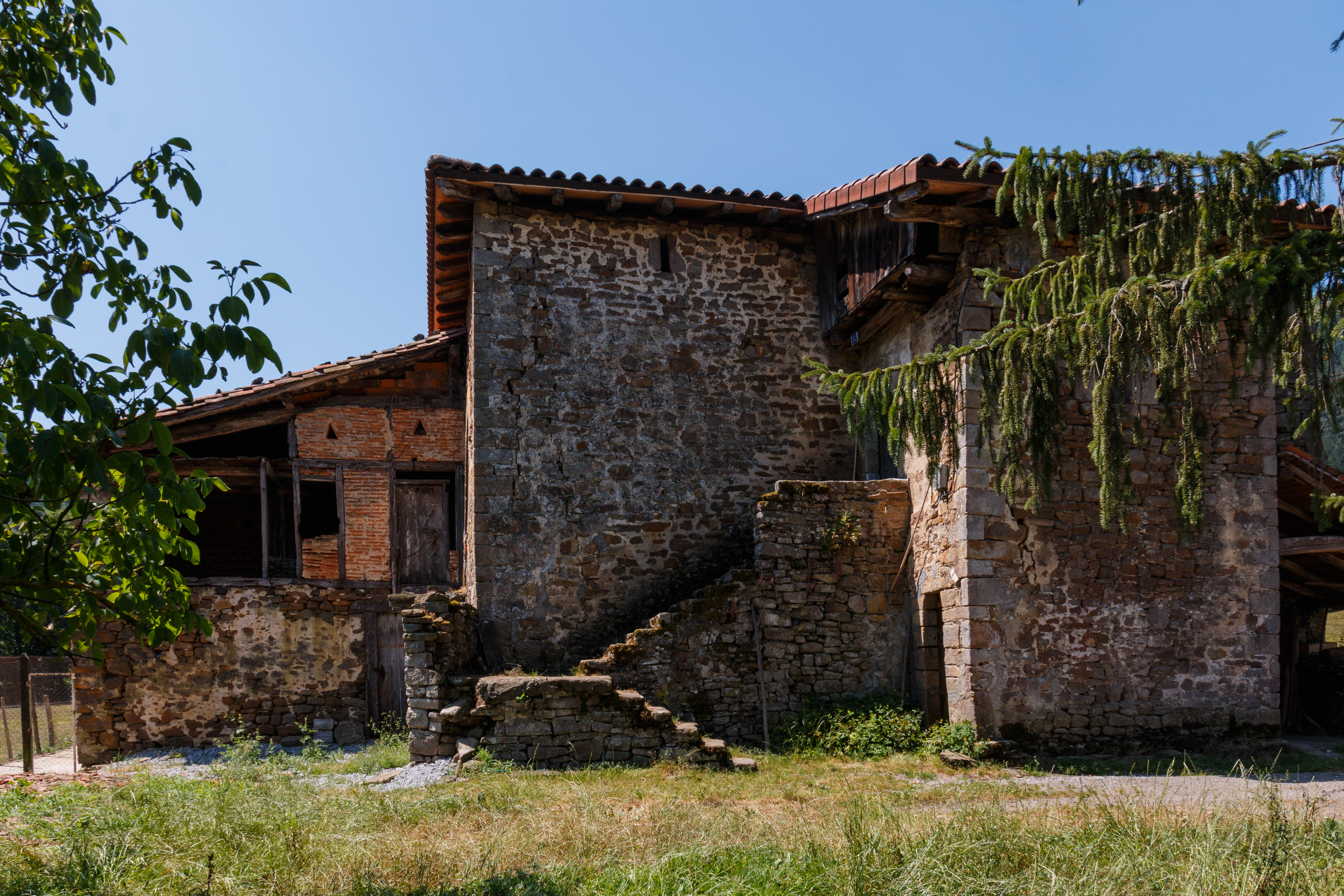
- Torre de Cadalso

- Location within Álava Location within the Basque Country Location within Spain
- Coordinates: 43°05′59″N 3°02′57″W
- Country: Spain
- Autonomous community: Basque Country
- Province: Álava
- Comarca: Ayala
- Municipality: Ayala/Aiara

Area
  - Total: 10.82 km^{2} (4.18 sq mi)
- Elevation: 247 m (810 ft)

Population (2023)
  - Total: 134
  - Density: 12.4/km^{2} (32.1/sq mi)
- Postal code: 01477

Zuaza (Spanish pronunciation: [ˈθwaθa]) or Zuhatza (Basque pronunciation: [s̻u.ats̻a]) is a village and concejo in the municipality of Ayala/Aiara, Álava, Basque Country, Spain. The Negorta Tower is located in the concejo.
