= Lejarzo =

Hamlet in Álava, Spain

Lejarzo/Lexartzu
- Concejo
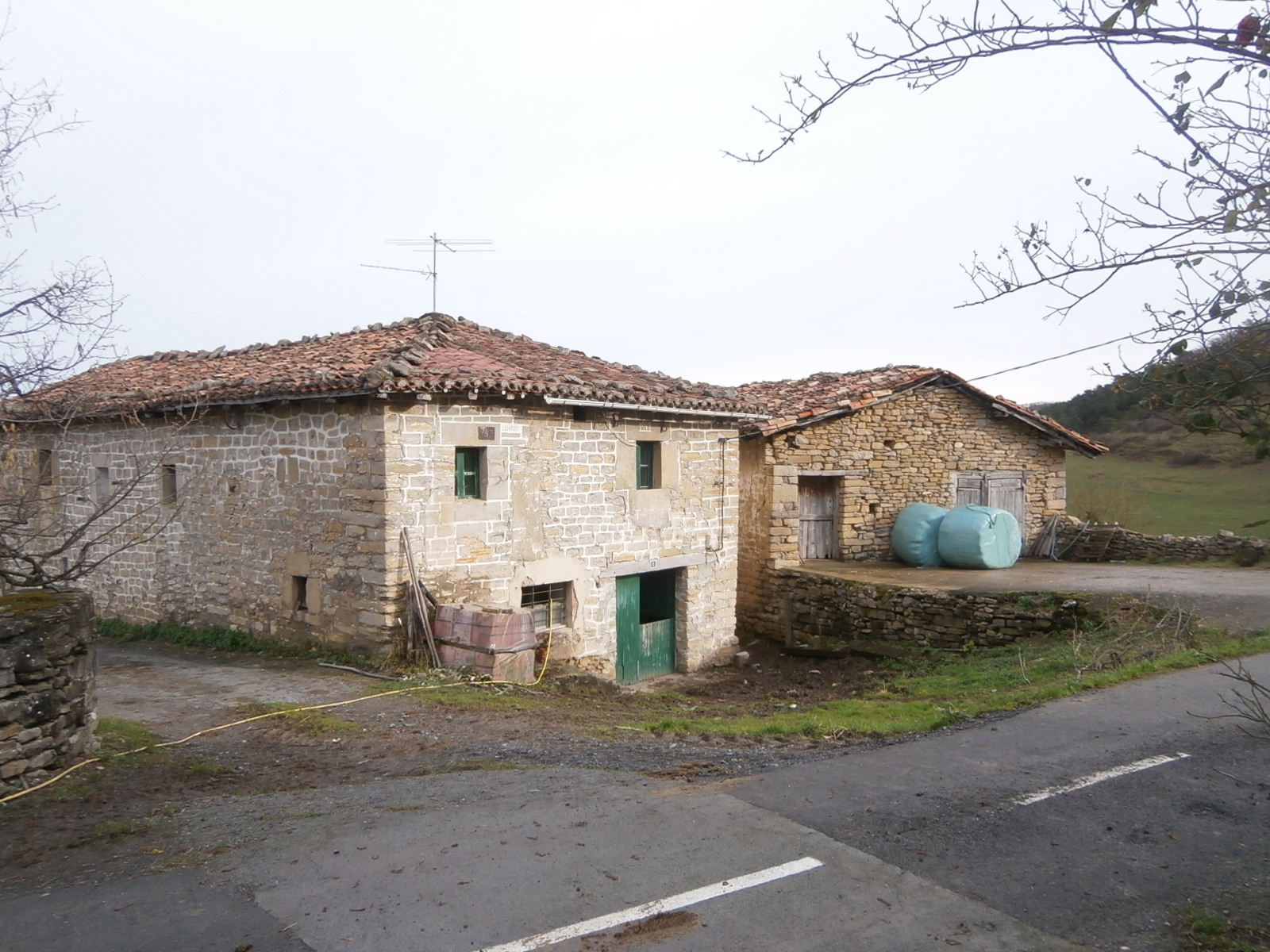

- Location within Álava Location within the Basque Country Location within Spain
- Coordinates: 43°03′37″N 3°07′23″W
- Country: Spain
- Autonomous community: Basque Country
- Province: Álava
- Comarca: Ayala
- Municipality: Ayala/Aiara

Area
  - Total: 2.02 km^{2} (0.78 sq mi)
- Elevation: 392 m (1,286 ft)

Population (2023)
  - Total: 17
  - Density: 8.4/km^{2} (22/sq mi)
- Postal code: 01477

Lejarzo (Spanish pronunciation: [leˈxaɾθo]) or Lexartzu (Basque pronunciation: [leʃarts̻u]) is a hamlet and concejo in the municipality of Ayala/Aiara, Álava, Basque Country, Spain.
