= Quejana =

Hamlet in Álava, Spain

Quejana/Kexaa
- Concejo
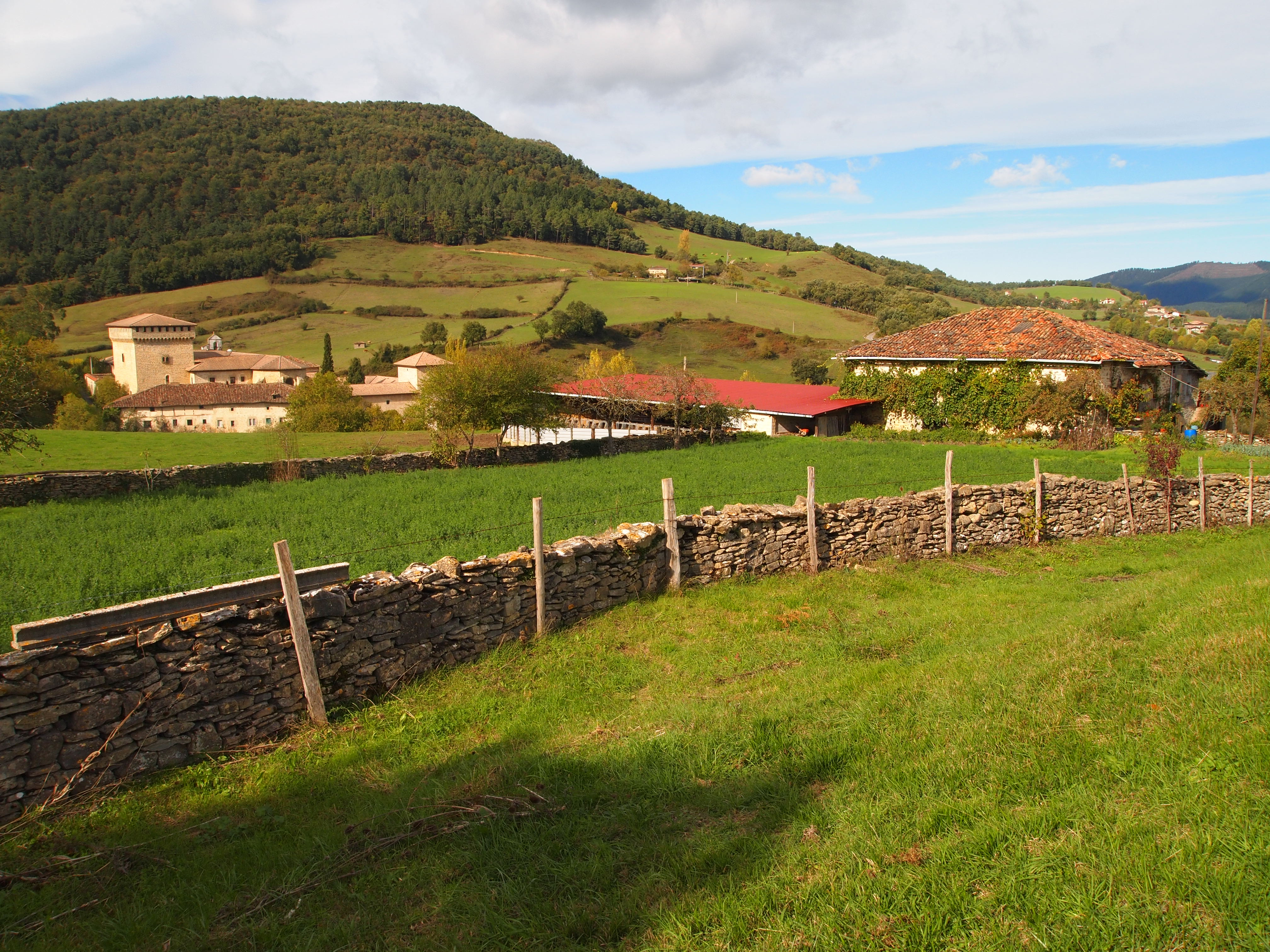

- Location within Álava Location within the Basque Country Location within Spain
- Coordinates: 43°04′33″N 3°04′22″W
- Country: Spain
- Autonomous community: Basque Country
- Province: Álava
- Comarca: Ayala
- Municipality: Ayala/Aiara

Area
  - Total: 3.2 km^{2} (1.2 sq mi)
- Elevation: 340 m (1,120 ft)

Population (2022)
  - Total: 35
  - Density: 11/km^{2} (28/sq mi)
- Postal code: 01477

Quejana (Spanish pronunciation: [keˈxana]) or Kexaa (Basque pronunciation: [keʃa.a], alternatively in Basque: Kexa) is a hamlet and concejo located in the municipality of Ayala/Aiara, in Álava province, Basque Country, Spain. It is the site of the Quejana palace, dating from the fourteenth century.
