= Inma Shara =

Spanish orchestral conductor (born 1972)

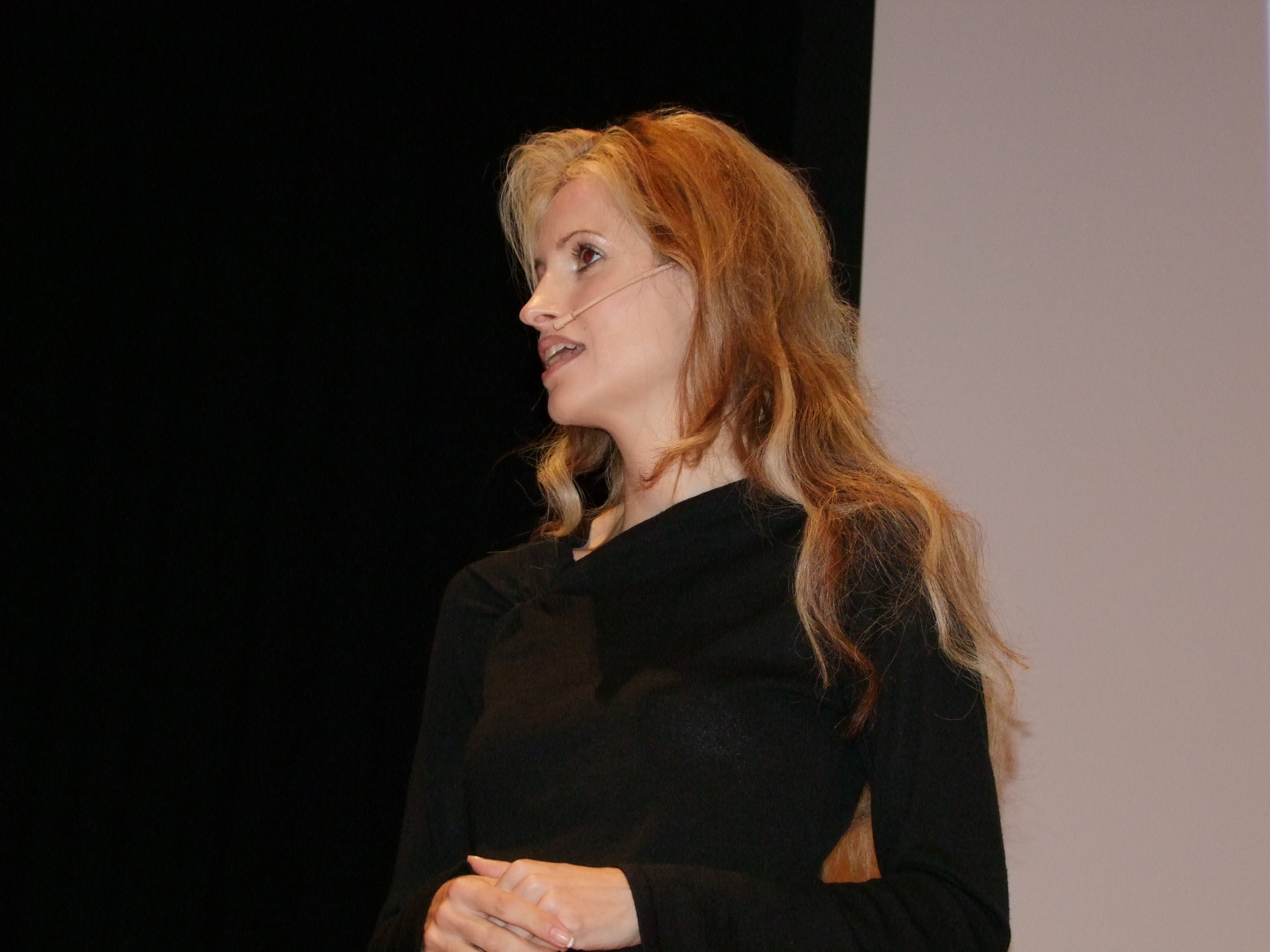
Inma Shara in 2009

Inma Shara (Inmaculada Lucia Saratxaga, born 1972 in Amurrio, Spain) is a Spanish orchestral conductor.

== Biography ==
She started practicing music at the age of 4, and made her professional debut as a conductor at the age of 27.

Some of her most recent commitments included her collaboration with leading orchestras such as the London Philharmonic Orchestra, the Israel Philharmonic Orchestra, the London Chamber Orchestra, the Czech National Symphony Orchestra, the Russian National Orchestra, the Royal Philharmonic Orchestra, the Rome Symphony Orchestra, the National Taiwan Symphony Orchestra, the Milan Symphony Orchestra, l'Orchestre de la Suisse Romande (Switzerland), the Lithuanian National Symphony Orchestra, the Latvian National Symphony Orchestra, the Parma Symphony Orchestra, and the Ukraine National Symphony Orchestra. In addition she has collaborated with soloists such as Mischa Maisky, Boris Berezovsky and Shlomo Mintz.

Shara conducted a concert in Madrid, in attendance was her Majesty Queen Sophie. She also conducted a concert for over 7,000 people in the Vatican City chaired by Benedict XVI, in order to celebrate the 60th anniversary of the Universal Declaration of Human Rights, becoming the first woman to do such performance, in December 2008.

She has recently been awarded with the prize to the European Excellence, and been named "Spain Brand Honorary Ambassador" from the Leading Brands of Spain Forum.

In addition to being invited by the European Commission and the SEEI to conduct the concert that has meant the closing day of Europe in the World Expo 2010 in Shanghai, on 9 May, at the head of the European Union Youth Orchestra.
