= Berganza =

Berganza is a surname. The surname is toponymic for a location called Berganza, or Bergantza in the Basque language, located in Araba/Álava, Basque Country, Spain. Notable people with the surname include:

- Eddie Berganza, American comics writer and editor
- Erik Berganza (born 1987), Basque singer
- Francisco de Berganza (1663–1738), Spanish Benedictine monk and medievalist
- Francisco Xavier Berganza (born 1967), Mexican politician
- Gustavo José Acevedo Berganza (born 1984), Salvadoran politician
- Imanol Baz Berganza (born 2001), Spanish soccer player
- José María Berganza (1809–1879), Chilean politician
- Paloma Berganza, Spanish singer
- Teresa Berganza (1933–2022), Spanish opera singer
