= Iñaki Bea =

Spanish footballer

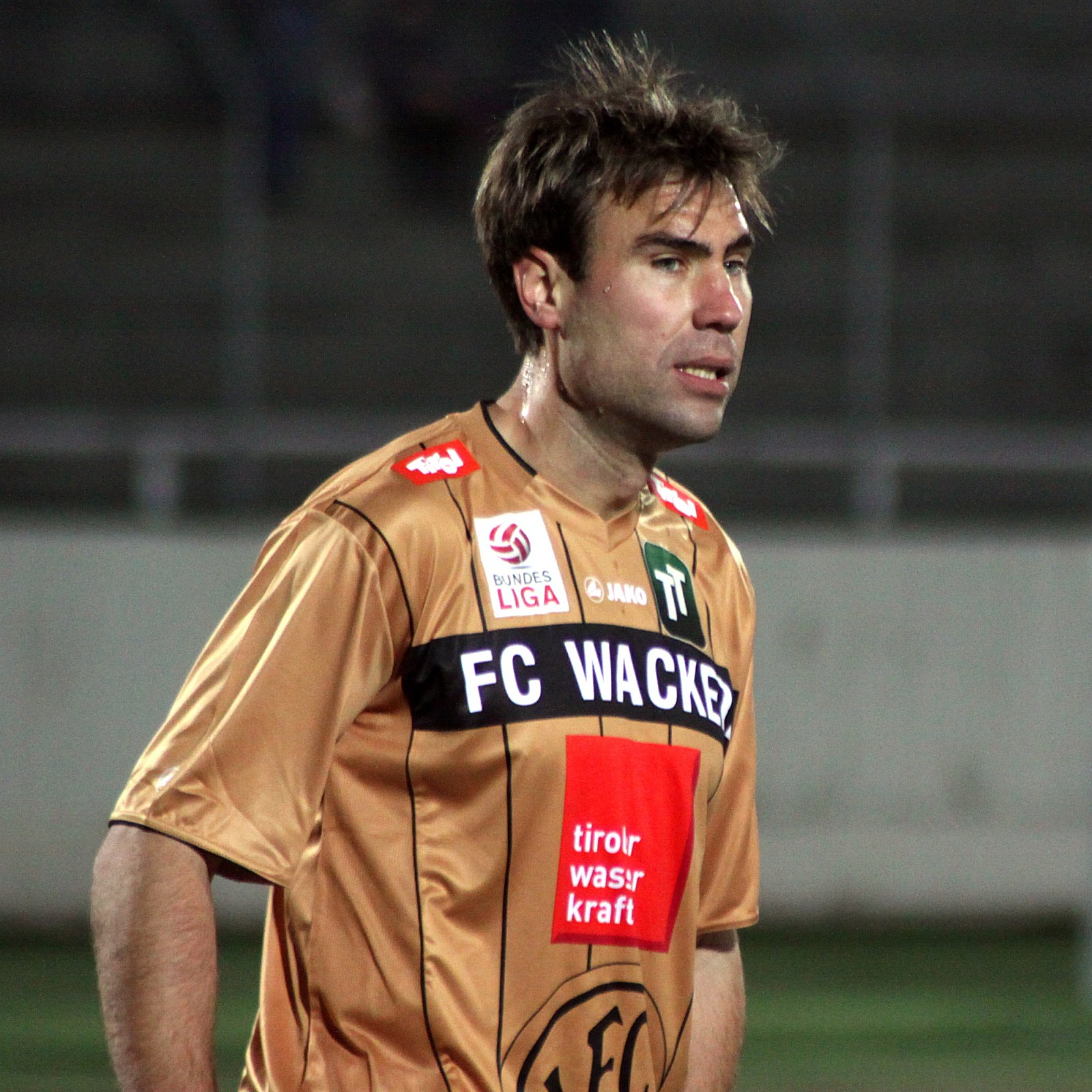
- Bea in 2012

Personal information
- Full name: Iñaki Bea Jauregi
- Date of birth: 27 June 1978 (age 48)
- Place of birth: Amurrio, Spain
- Height: 1.85 m (6 ft 1 in)
- Position: Centre-back

Team information
- Current team: Gimnástica Segoviana (manager)

Senior career*
Years	Team	Apps	(Gls)
1998–2000	Amorebieta		
2000–2003	Amurrio	82	(1)
2003	Ciudad Murcia	10	(0)
2003–2006	Lorca Deportiva	93	(1)
2006–2009	Valladolid	59	(3)
2009–2010	Murcia	26	(1)
2010–2012	Wacker Innsbruck	63	(1)
Total		333	(8)

Managerial career
- 2014: Levante (assistant)
- 2015–2021: Eibar (assistant)
- 2022: Dominican Republic
- 2022–2023: Numancia
- 2024: Águilas
- 2024: Stripfing
- 2025–: Gimnástica Segoviana
- * Club domestic league appearances and goals

Iñaki Bea Jauregi (born 27 June 1978) is a Spanish former professional footballer who played as a central defender, currently manager of Segunda Federación club Gimnástica Segoviana.

== Playing career ==
Bea was born in Amurrio, Álava. After starting out with modest clubs in his native Basque Country, and having a stint in the Segunda División B with Ciudad de Murcia, he had his first taste of professional football at Lorca Deportiva CF in the 2005–06 season, helping the side retain their Segunda División status under Unai Emery.

Subsequently, Bea joined Real Valladolid, scoring three goals in 35 games as the Castile and León team returned to La Liga in 2007 after a three-year absence but being less used in the following years – only seven matches in the 2007–08 campaign and 17 in 2008–09. He made his debut in the Spanish top flight on 28 October 2007, featuring 45 minutes in the 2–2 away draw against CA Osasuna.

Bea left in June 2009, moving to the second tier with Real Murcia CF. He was relegated in his only season, being subsequently released.

Aged 32, Bea had his first experience abroad, signing a 1+1 contract with Austrian club FC Wacker Innsbruck. He made his Bundesliga debut on 18 July 2010, playing the entire 4–0 home win over SK Rapid Wien. His only goal in the competition arrived on 22 September of that year, when he helped to a 4–2 away defeat of Kapfenberger SV.

== Coaching career ==
After retiring, Bea worked as assistant manager at Levante UD and SD Eibar under José Luis Mendilibar, his former coach at Valladolid. On 24 February 2022, he was appointed head coach of the Dominican Republic national side.

Bea signed with CD Numancia in the same capacity in November 2022. The following 1 May, he was dismissed.

Subsequently, Bea was in charge of Segunda Federación clubs Águilas FC and Gimnástica Segoviana CF.

== Managerial statistics ==
As of 14 December 2025

Managerial record by team and tenure
Team	Nat	From	To	Record							
Team	Nat	From	To	G	W	D	L	GF	GA	GD	Win %
Dominican Republic	(Dominican Republic)	24 February 2022	10 November 2022	4	1	1	2	5	6	−1	25.00
Numancia	(Spain)	11 November 2022	1 May 2023	24	8	8	8	23	26	−3	33.33
Águilas	(Spain)	19 February 2024	8 April 2024	7	1	3	3	5	8	−3	14.29
Stripfing	(Austria)	17 June 2024	11 October 2024	11	3	3	5	12	13	−1	27.27
Gimnástica Segoviana	(Spain)	26 June 2025	Present	15	9	4	2	19	9	+10	60.00
Total				61	22	19	20	64	62	+2	36.07

== Honours ==
Valladolid

- Segunda División: 2006–07
