= Iñaki Isasi =

Spanish cyclist

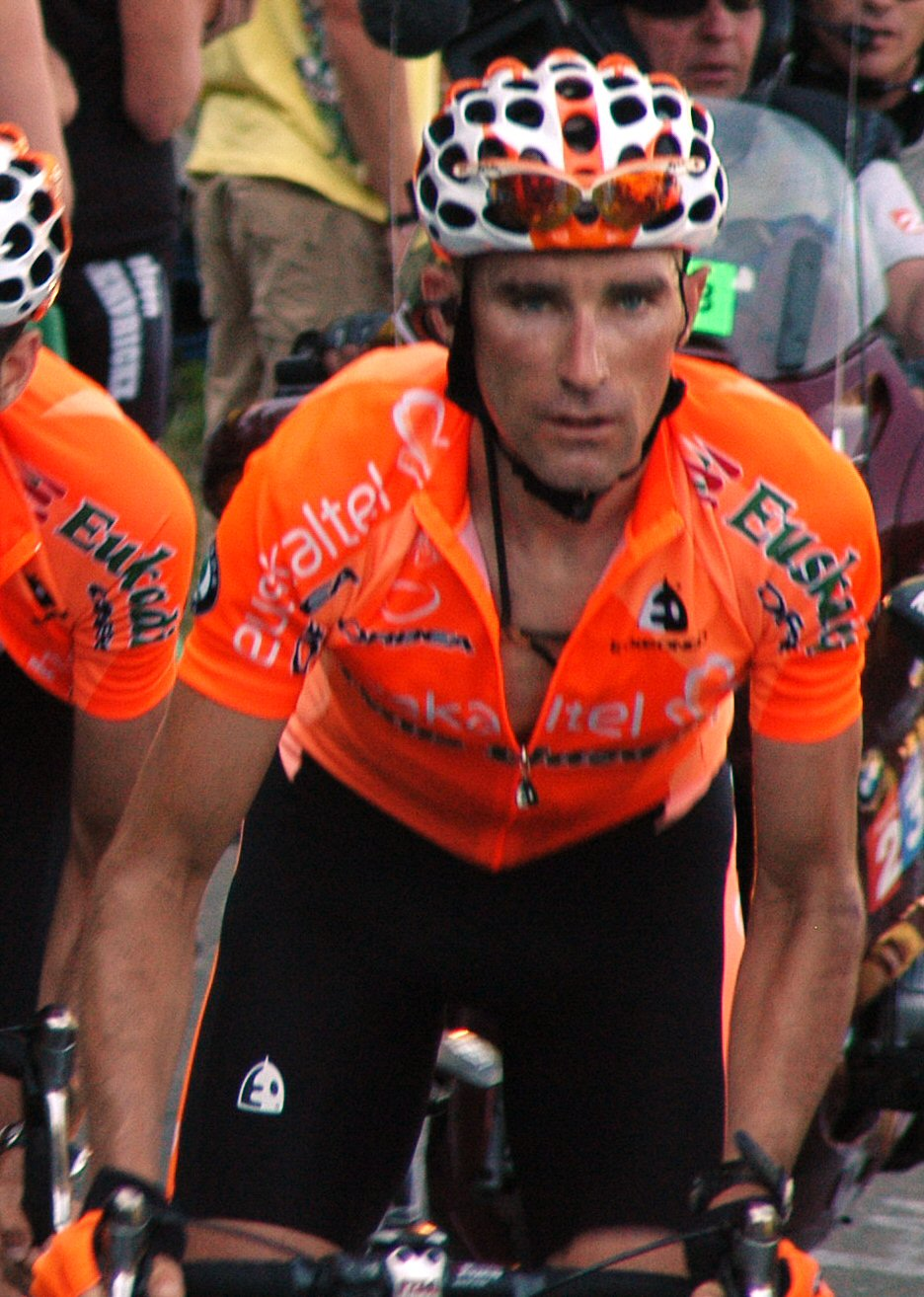
- Isasi in the 2007 Tour de France

Personal information
- Full name: Iñaki Isasi Flores
- Born: April 20, 1977 (age 49) Respaldiza, Spain

Cycling career
- Sport: Cycling
- Discipline: Road
- Role: Retired
- Rider type: Sprinter

Amateur team
- 2000: Cantanhede–Marques de Marialva

Professional team
- 2001–2011: Euskaltel–Euskadi

Managerial team
- 2013: Euskaltel–Euskadi

Iñaki Isasi Flores (born April 20, 1977, in Respaldiza, in Álava) is a former Spanish racing cyclist who competed professionally for the Euskaltel–Euskadi team throughout his career. Isasi turned professional in 2001 and did not record a major result of note as a professional. Isasi can climb and sprint and was a feature in many breakaways in the 2006 Tour de France where he finished 3rd on stage 5 won by Óscar Freire of Rabobank.

== Major results ==
2001
8th Overall Tour de l'Avenir
2003
6th GP Villafranca de Ordizia
2004
7th Overall Escalada a Montjuïc
2006
3rd Trofeo Calvià
4th Overall Vuelta a Andalucía
2011
9th Tour de Vendée

=== Grand Tour general classification results timeline ===
Grand Tour	2003	2004	2005	2006	2007	2008	2009	2010	2011
Giro d'Italia	—	—	—	—	—	—	—	—	63
Tour de France	—	—	122	70	90	101	—	115	—
Vuelta a España	91	89	—	DNF	74	—	71	—	71
