= Ayala/Aiara =

Ayala / Aiara Aiara (in Basque)
- Municipality
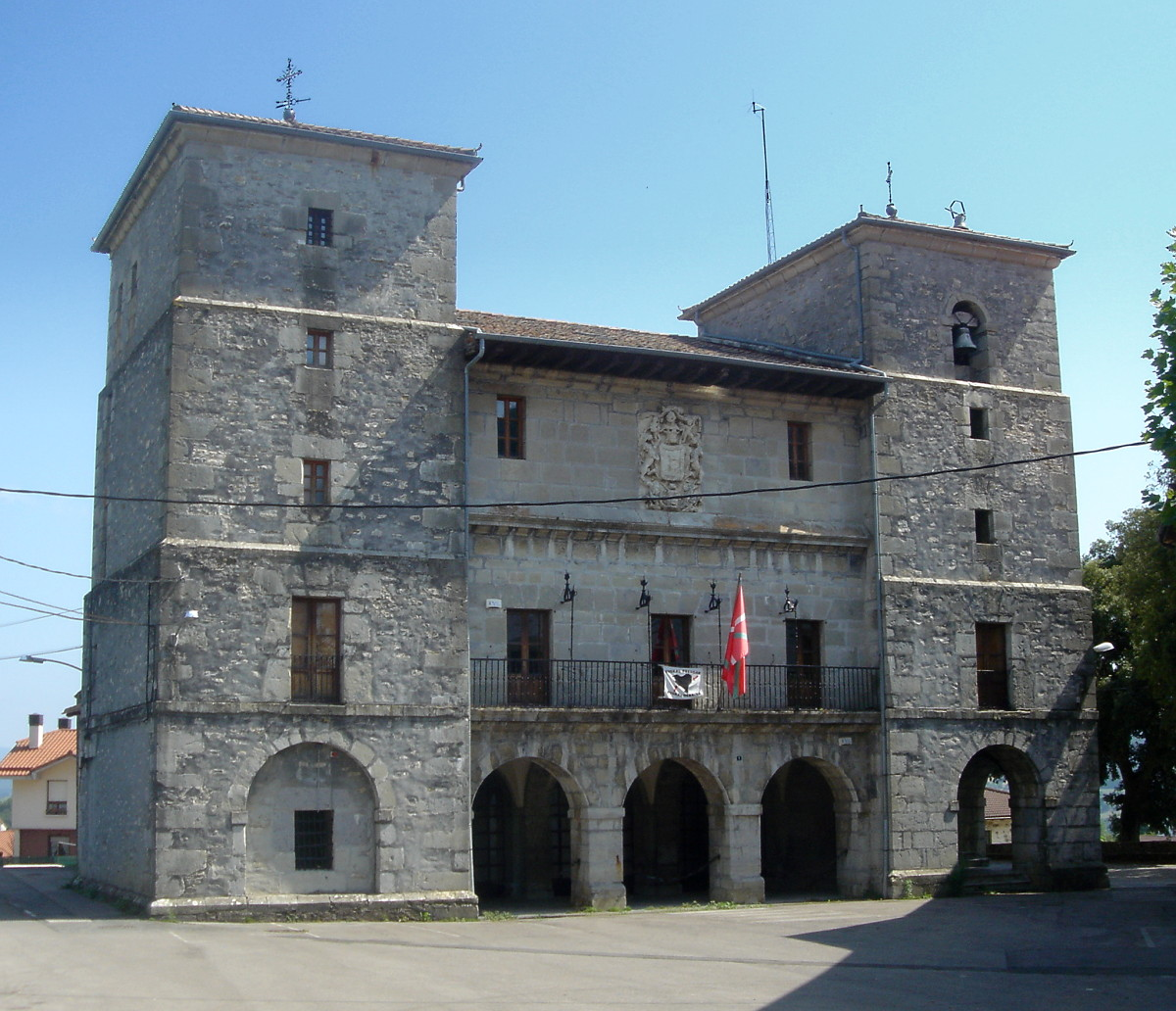
- Town Hall of Ayala-Aiara, in the concejo (hamlet) of Arespalditza

- Coat of arms

- Location within Álava Location within the Basque Country Location within Spain
- Coordinates: 43°5′0″N 3°3′47″W
- Country: Spain
- Autonomous community: Basque Country
- Province: Álava
- Eskualdea / Comarca: Ayala/Aiara

Government
  - Mayor: Gentza Alamillo Udaeta (EAJ-PNV)

Area
  - Total: 140.90 km^{2} (54.40 sq mi)
- Elevation: 325 m (1,066 ft)

Population (2018)
  - Total: 2,967
  - Density: 21.06/km^{2} (54.54/sq mi)
- Postal code: 01476

Aiara in Basque or Ayala in Spanish is a municipality located in the province of Álava, in the Basque Country, northern Spain.

== Localities ==
Name		Population				
Spanish	Basque	2000	2005	2010	2015	2019
Aguíñiga	Agiñaga	22	27	27	21	21
Añes	Añes	29	29	24	20	22
Beotegui (Note: While all other villages in the municipality have individual councils, Beotegui and Menagaray have a combined council, Menagaray-Beotegui, so their population figures reflect the council's combined total.)	Beotegi	196	207	219	209	218
Costera	Opellora	25	29	27	24	27
Echegoyen	Etxegoien	21	17	19	22	13
Erbi	Erbi	5	5	9	10	13
Izoria	Izoria	126	151	160	159	159
Lejarzo	Lexartzu	15	11	15	13	15
Llanteno	Lanteno	137	132	122	111	103
Lujo	Luxo	3	6	5	4	3
Luyando	Luiaondo	529	925	1131	1242	1271
Madaria	Madaria	11	11	10	5	12
Maroño	Maroño	40	36	33	39	31
Menagaray	Menagarai	196	207	219	209	218
Menoyo	Menoio	42	42	36	33	33
Murga	Murga	107	106	113	120	126
Oceca	Ozeka	8	4	12	12	18
Olabezar	Olabezar	75	62	63	69	73
Quejana	Keixaa	59	55	44	42	34
Respaldiza	Arespalditza	327	403	488	497	512
Retes de Llanteno	Erretes Lanteno	63	67	70	65	60
Salmantón	Salmantón	27	33	32	31	36
Sojo	Soxo	52	47	51	53	47
Zuaza	Zuhatza	145	137	117	126	127
