= Paloma Berganza =

Spanish singer

Paloma Berganza (born in Madrid), she studied guitar, solfege and harmony at the Real Conservatorio Superior de Música in Madrid. She studied vocal interpretation and accompaniment with composer/guitarist Jorge Cardoso, classical singing with Angeles Chamorro and Concha Doñaque, vocal jazz with singer Connie Philp and voice ortofony and interpretation with Miguel Cuevas.

Despite being educated in classical music and belonging to a family with a lyrical tradition (she is the niece of world-renowned mezzo soprano Teresa Berganza), she soon found her own style with the impressive repertoire of chanson, bossa nova, and jazz…

In 1996, she won second prize in the prestigious competition Vive la Reprise organized by the Centre Chanson d´Expression Française in the Théâtre de Vanves in Paris. It was the first time a non-francophone artist earned this merit.

Paloma has performed extensively in such places as the III Autumn Festival in Madrid, as part of the cast in La Zapatera Prodigiosa by Garcia Lorca in the Teatro Albeniz; the Europa Cantat IX Festival, singing in the Cantata de las Naciones Unidas by C. Halffter; the Vasque Song Festival in Renteria, with guitarist Eduardo Baranzano; the XVII International Film Music Encounter (chanson) in the Maestranza Theater; the United Nations headquarters; the Principe de Asturias Foundation.

Both her first and second CDs, were nominated for Best Jazz Album (2003 and 2005) by the Spanish Music Academy.

Recent recitals and concerts include but are not limited to the following: Teatro Espanol (Madrid), Teatro Calderón (Valladolid)), Teatro Guimerá (Tenerife), “La Caixa” Foundation (Palma de Mallorca), Universidad Internacional Menendez y Pelayo (Santander), Calle 54 (Madrid) and L’Espai (Barcelona).
