= Maroño =

Hamlet in Álava, Spain

- Concejo
- Location within Álava Location within the Basque Country Location within Spain
- Coordinates: 43°03′06″N 3°03′32″W
- Country: Spain
- Autonomous community: Basque Country
- Province: Álava
- Comarca: Ayala
- Municipality: Ayala/Aiara

Area
  - Total: 3.49 km^{2} (1.35 sq mi)
- Elevation: 368 m (1,207 ft)

Population (2023)
  - Total: 27
  - Density: 7.7/km^{2} (20/sq mi)
- Postal code: 01479

Maroño is a hamlet and concejo in the municipality of Ayala/Aiara, Álava, Basque Country, Spain.
