= Respaldiza =

Village in Álava, Spain

Respaldiza/Arespalditza
- Concejo
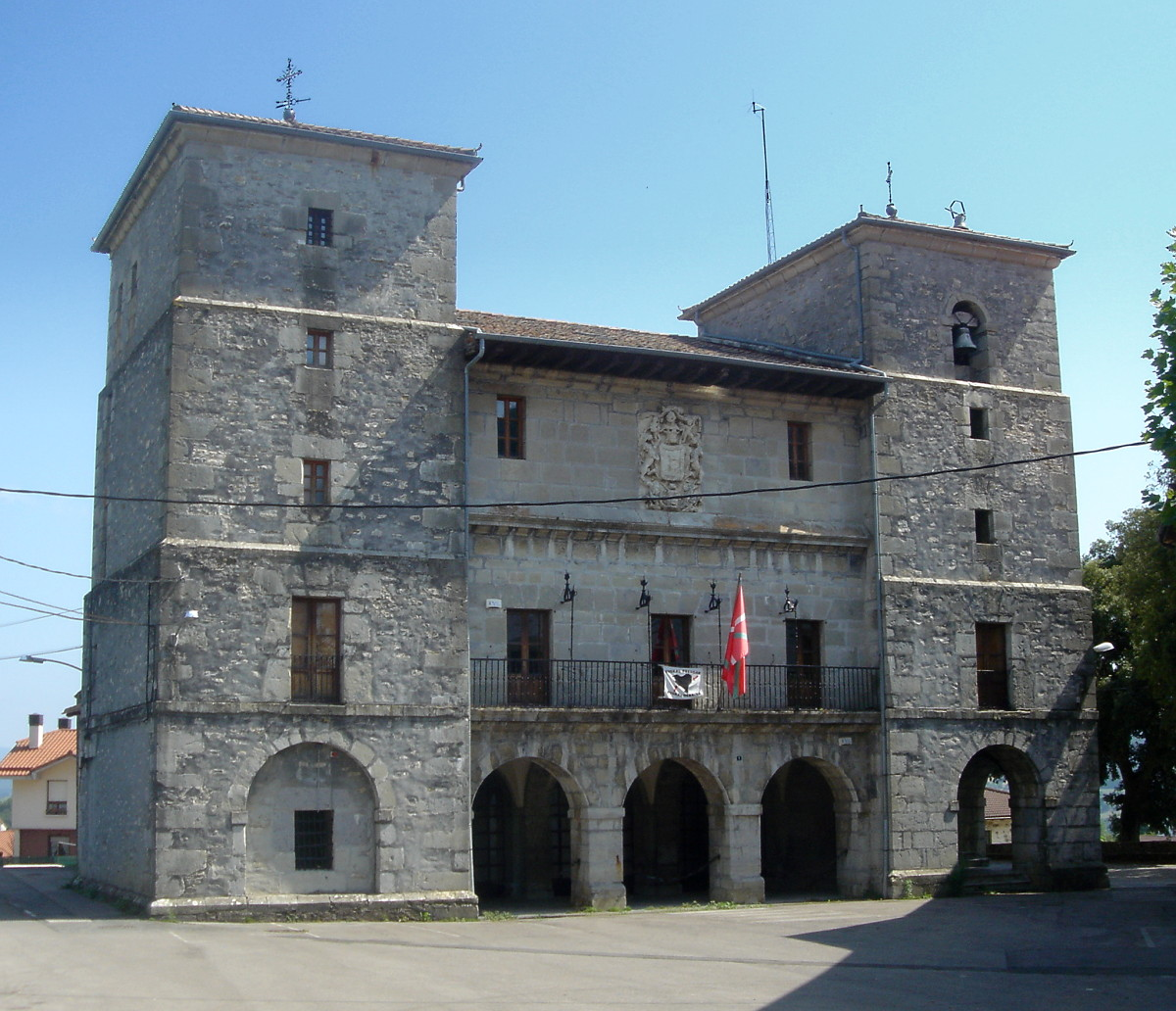
- The town hall of Ayala in Respaldiza

- Location within Álava Location within the Basque Country Location within Spain
- Coordinates: 43°04′38″N 3°02′37″W
- Country: Spain
- Autonomous community: Basque Country
- Province: Álava
- Comarca: Ayala
- Municipality: Ayala/Aiara

Area
  - Total: 9.96 km^{2} (3.85 sq mi)
- Elevation: 312 m (1,024 ft)

Population (2023)
  - Total: 491
  - Density: 49.3/km^{2} (128/sq mi)
- Postal code: 01476

Respaldiza (Spanish pronunciation: [respalˈdiθa]) or Arespalditza (Basque pronunciation: [aɾes̺paldits̻a]) is a village and concejo in the municipality of Ayala/Aiara, Álava, Basque Country, Spain. It is the capital of the municipality.

== Notable people ==
- Iñaki Isasi (born 1977), professional cyclist.
