= Cuadrilla de Ayala =

Cuadrilla de Ayala/Aiarako kuadrilla
- Comarca
- Coat of arms

- Location within Álava
- Coordinates: 43.082832°N 3.04105°W
- Country: Spain
- Autonomous community: Basque Country
- Province: Álava
- Seat: Respaldiza

Government
  - President of the Council: Encina Castresana

Area
  - Total: 328.12 km^{2} (126.69 sq mi)

Population (2022)
  - Total: 34,131
  - Density: 104.02/km^{2} (269.41/sq mi)
- Time zone: UTC+1 (CET)
  - Summer (DST): UTC+2 (CEST)

The Cuadrilla de Ayala (Basque: Aiarako kuadrilla or Aiaraldea) is a comarca of the province of Álava, Basque Country, Spain. It comprises the municipalities of Amurrio, Artziniega, Ayala/Aiara, Laudio/Llodio and Okondo. Since 2021 its seat is Respaldiza, in the municipality of Ayala.
