= List of Bienes de Interés Cultural in Álava =

This is a list of Bien de Interés Cultural landmarks in the Álava, Basque Country, Spain.

== List ==
Included in the list provisionally

| Name | Image | Location | Date listed | Reference no. | Type |
|---|---|---|---|---|---|
| Anda-Salazar Palace | | Subijana de Álava, Vitoria-Gasteiz | 17 Jul 1984 | RI-51-0005126 | Monumento |
| Augustin Zulueta Palace | | Vitoria-Gasteiz | 1 Mar 1962 | RI-51-0001300 | Monumento |
| Ayala Palace | | Quejana, Ayala/Aiara | 17 Jul 1984 | RI-51-0005129 | Monumento |
| Basilica of San Prudencio de Armentia | | Armentia, Vitoria-Gasteiz | 3 Jun 1931 | RI-51-0000357 | Monumento |
| Bendaña Palace | | Vitoria-Gasteiz | 17 Jul 1984 | RI-51-0005128 | Monumento |
| Bridge of Mantible | | Laserna, Laguardia (Note: Shared with the municipality of Logroño in La Rioja. Officially listed in La Rioja only.) | 25 Jan 1983 | RI-51-0004791 | Monumento |
| Bridge of Trespuentes | | Trespuentes, Iruña de Oca/Iruña Oka | 22 May 1916 | RI-51-0000144 | Monumento |
| Camino de Santiago in Álava | | | 7 Sep 1962 | RI-51-0000035 | Conjunto histórico |
| Casa del Cordón | | Vitoria-Gasteiz | 17 Jul 1984 | RI-51-0005127 | Monumento |
| Casa del Santo | | Armentia, Vitoria-Gasteiz | 17 Jul 1984 | RI-51-0005130 | Monumento |
| Cathedral of Santa María de Vitoria | | Vitoria-Gasteiz | 3 Jun 1931 | RI-51-0000359 | Monumento |
| Chapel of San Juan | | Markinez, Bernedo | 17 Jul 1984 | RI-51-0005100 | Monumento |
| Church of la Asunción de Nuestra Señora | | Santa Cruz de Campezo, Campezo/Kanpezu | 17 Jul 1984 | RI-51-0005099 | Monumento |
| Church of la Asunción de Nuestra Señora | | Tuesta, Valdegovía/Gaubea | 17 Jul 1984 | RI-51-0005108 | Monumento |
| Church of la Natividad de Nuestra Señora | | Añua, Elburgo/Burgelu | 4 May 1994 | ARI-51-0009008 | Monumento |
| Church of Nuestra Señora de la Asunción | | Elvillar | 17 Jul 1984 | RI-51-0005106 | Monumento |
| Church of Nuestra Señora de la Asunción | | Labastida | 17 Jul 1984 | RI-51-0005105 | Monumento |
| Church of Nuestra Señora de la Asunción | | Lasarte, Vitoria-Gasteiz | 3 Jun 1931 | RI-51-0000361 | Monumento |
| Church of Nuestra Señora de la Peña | | Faido, Peñacerrada-Urizaharra | 17 Jul 1984 | RI-51-0005107 | Monumento |
| Church of San Andrés | | Elciego | 17 Jul 1984 | RI-51-0005104 | Monumento |
| Church of San Juan | | Agurain/Salvatierra | 17 Jul 1984 | RI-51-0005110 | Monumento |
| Church of San Juan Bautista | | Laguardia | 17 Jul 1984 | RI-51-0005103 | Monumento |
| Church of San Miguel | | Vitoria-Gasteiz | 14 Nov 1995 | RI-51-0005442 | Monumento |
| Church of San Pedro Apóstol | | Vitoria-Gasteiz | 3 Jun 1931 | RI-51-0000360 | Monumento |
| Church of San Vicente Mártir | | Vitoria-Gasteiz | 17 Jul 1984 | RI-51-0005102 | Monumento |
| Church of Santa María | | Agurain/Salvatierra | 17 Jul 1984 | RI-51-0005109 | Monumento |
| Church of Santa María de los Reyes | | Laguardia | 3 Jun 1931 | RI-51-0000362 | Monumento |
| Cistercian Monastery of Barria | | Barria, San Millán/Donemiliaga | 17 Jul 1984 | RI-51-0005111 | Monumento |
| Hurtado de Mendoza Tower | | Martioda, Vitoria-Gasteiz | 5 Jun 1962 | RI-51-0001433 | Monumento |
| Iruña-Veleia | | Trespuentes, Iruña de Oca/Iruña Oka | 22 May 1916 | RI-55-0000003 | Zona arqueológica |
| La Hoya | | Laguardia | 17 Jul 1984 | RI-51-0005133 | Monumento |
| Labastida Town Hall | | Labastida | 17 Jul 1984 | RI-51-0005114 | Monumento |
| Lazarraga Palace | | Zalduondo | 17 Jul 1984 | RI-51-0005125 | Monumento |
| Lazarraga Tower | | Larrea, Barrundia | 17 Jul 1984 | RI-51-0005131 | Monumento |
| Los Arquillos | | Vitoria-Gasteiz | 17 Jul 1984 | RI-51-0005113 | Monumento |
| Negorta Tower | | Zuaza, Ayala/Aiara | 17 Aug 1988 | ARI-51-0005445 | Monumento |
| Old Town of Agurain/Salvatierra | | Agurain/Salvatierra | 10 Jul 1975 | RI-53-0000192 | Conjunto histórico |
| Old Town of Artziniega | | Artziniega | 10 Jul 1975 | ARI-53-0000375 | Conjunto histórico |
| Old Town of Laguardia | | Laguardia | 5 Mar 1964 | RI-51-0000045 | Conjunto histórico |
| Old Town of Vitoria-Gasteiz | | Vitoria-Gasteiz | 10 Mar 1988 | ARI-51-0000374 | Conjunto histórico |
| Plaza de España | | Vitoria-Gasteiz | 17 Jul 1984 | RI-51-0005112 | Monumento |
| Provincial Historic Archive of Álava | | Vitoria-Gasteiz | 10 Nov 1997 | RI-AR-0000011 | Archivo |
| Salt Valley of Añana | | Salinas de Añana, Añana | 17 Jul 1984 | RI-51-0005132 | Monumento |
| Sanctuary of Nuestra Señora de Estíbaliz | | Estíbaliz, Vitoria-Gasteiz | 3 Jun 1931 | RI-51-0000358 | Monumento |
| Tower of Mendoza | | Mendoza, Vitoria-Gasteiz | 17 Jul 1984 | RI-51-0005119 | Monumento |
| Tower of Murga | | Murga, Ayala/Aiara | 17 Jul 1984 | RI-51-0005118 | Monumento |
| Tower of Orgaz | | Fontecha, Lantarón | 17 Jul 1984 | RI-51-0005122 | Monumento |
| Tower of the Condestable | | Fontecha, Lantarón | 17 Jul 1984 | RI-51-0005123 | Monumento |
| Tower of Villanañe | | Villanañe, Valdegovía/Gaubea | 17 Jul 1984 | RI-51-0005121 | Monumento |
| Tower-palace of Guevara | | Guevara, Barrundia | 17 Jul 1984 | RI-51-0005120 | Monumento |
| Walls of Antoñana | | Antoñana, Campezo/Kanpezu | 17 Jul 1984 | RI-51-0005117 | Monumento |
| Walls of Labraza | | Labraza, Oyón-Oion | 17 Jul 1984 | RI-51-0005116 | Monumento |
| Walls of Salinillas de Buradón | | Salinillas de Buradón, Labastida | 17 Jul 1984 | RI-51-0005115 | Monumento |
| Zurbano Palace | | Zurbano, Arratzua-Ubarrundia | 17 Jul 1984 | RI-51-0005124 | Monumento |
