= Prudencio =

Prudencio or Prudêncio may refer to the following people

Given name

- Prudencio Benavides (1870–?), Cuban baseball center fielder and manager
- Prudencio Cardona (born 1951), Colombian boxer
- Prudencio Indurain (born 1968), Spanish cyclist
- Prudencio Norales (born 1956), Honduran football midfielder
- Prudencio de Orobio y Basterra, Spanish merchant, soldier and government official
- Prudencio Ortiz de Rozas (1800–1857), Argentine general
- Prudencio de Pena (born 1913), Uruguayan basketball player
- Pruden, nickname of the Spanish footballer Prudencio Sánchez Fernández (1916–1998)
- Prudencio de Sandoval (1553–1620), Spanish historian and Benedictine monk
- Prudencio of Tarazona, Spanish anchorite and cleric, bishop of Tarazona
  - San Prudencio festival

Surname

- José López Prudencio (1870–1949), Spanish writer
- José Prudencio Padilla (1784–1828), Colombian military leader
- Mauricio Prudencio (born 1980), Bolivian swimmer
- Miel Prudencio Ma, Filipino cartoonist and illustrator
- Nelson Prudêncio (1944–2012), Brazilian triple jumper
