= Basilica of San Prudencio de Armentia =

Church in Vitoria-Gasteiz, Spain

- Basílica de San Prudencio de Armentia (Spanish) Armentiako San Prudentzioren basilika (Basque)
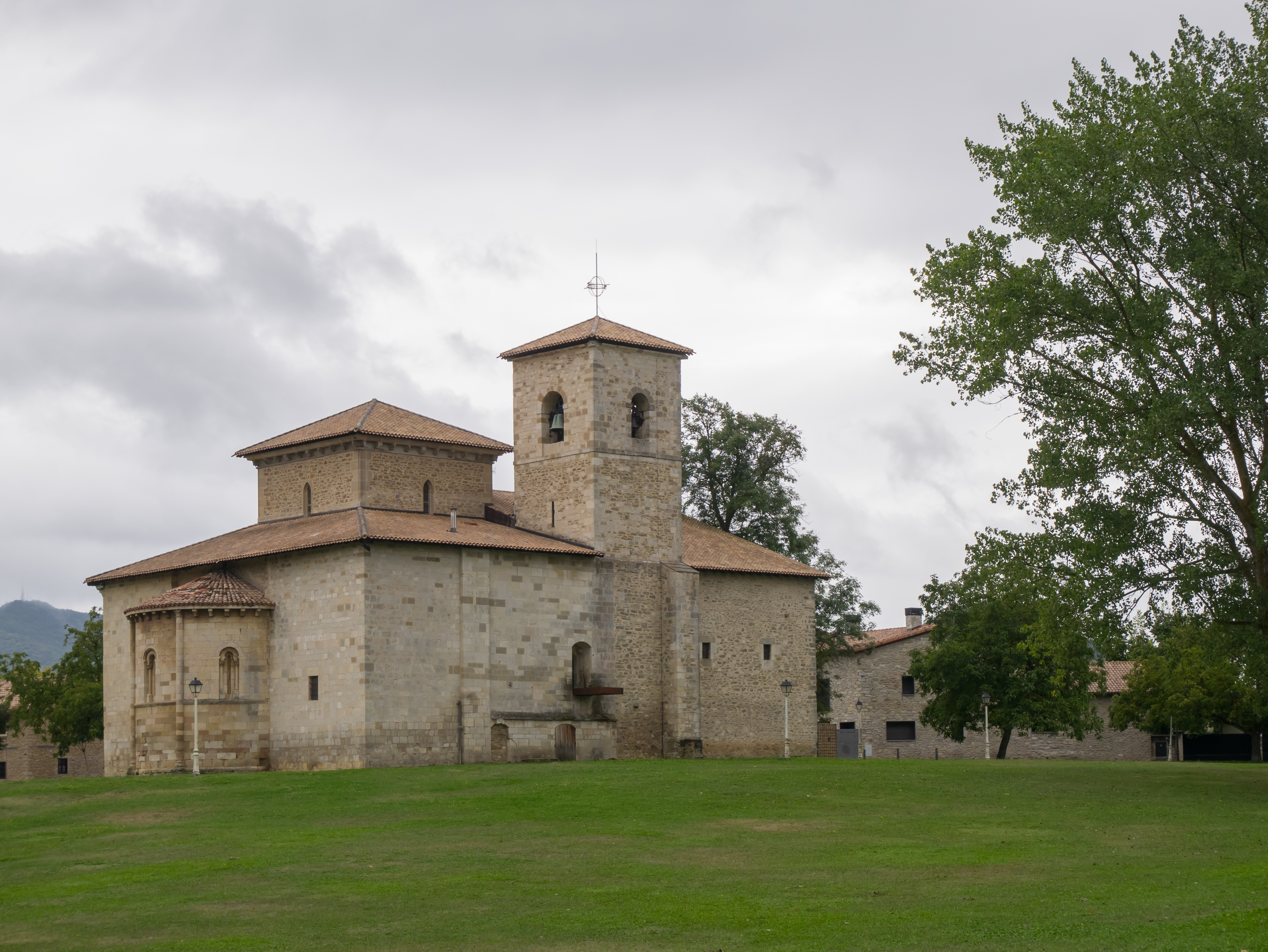
- View of the basilica
- 42.833099°N 2.702198°W
- Location: Vitoria-Gasteiz, Álava, Basque Country
- Country: Spain
- Denomination: Catholic Church
- Tradition: Latin Church

History
- Status: Parish church

Architecture
- Style: Romanesque

Administration
- Archdiocese: Archidiocese of Burgos
- Diocese: Diocese of Vitoria

Spanish Cultural Heritage
- Official name: Basílica de San Prudencio de Armentia
- Type: Non-movable
- Criteria: Monument
- Designated: 1931
- Reference no.: RI-51-0000357

Basque Cultural Heritage
- Criteria: Monument complex
- Designated: 27 January 2012
- Part of: Camino de Santiago

The Basilica of San Prudencio de Armentia (Spanish: Basílica de San Prudencio de Armentia; Basque: Armentiako San Prudentzioren basilika) is a basilica located in Armentia, Vitoria-Gasteiz, Basque Country, Spain. It was built in the 12th-century in Romanesque style. The basilica lies on the Camino de Santiago.

Originally dedicated to Saint Andrew, it was refurbished in 1776, destroying part of its original structure, although the apse and other isolated elements such were retained. The last mayor works in the basilica took place after the partial collapse of the vault in 1961. Despite the 1776 reform, it is considered one of the most important examples of medieval art in Álava. It was declared Bien de Interés Cultural in 1931 and Basque Cultural Heritage in 2012.

== Architecture ==
Built with a Latin cross layout, the vaults over the apse and crossing of its two arms are of special interest. The bases of the arches of the second of these vaults contain four sculptures of the evangelists. The capitals of the church are decorated with plant and animal motifs, as well as battle scenes between horsemen and centaurs. Its atrium contains the remains of the original portico. After being dismantled, stones from the portico were embedded in the walls in a disorderly fashion: the tympanum of the Lamb and that of Christ with the Apostles and the bas-reliefs of the Harrowing of Hell and the Sepulchre of Jesus, which represents one of the best Romanesque sculptural groups in the Basque Country.

Portico of San Prudencio de Armentia
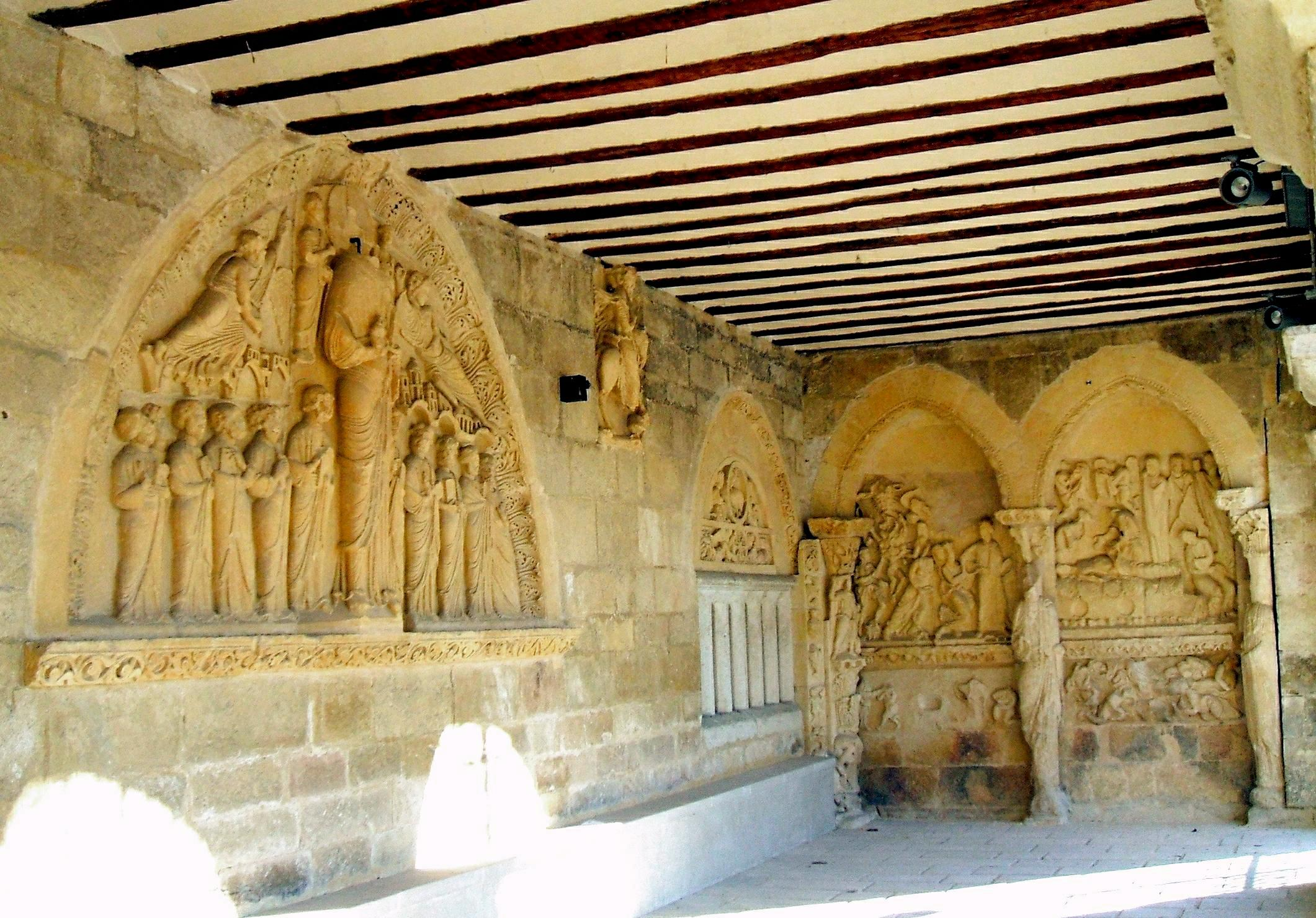
General view of the portico

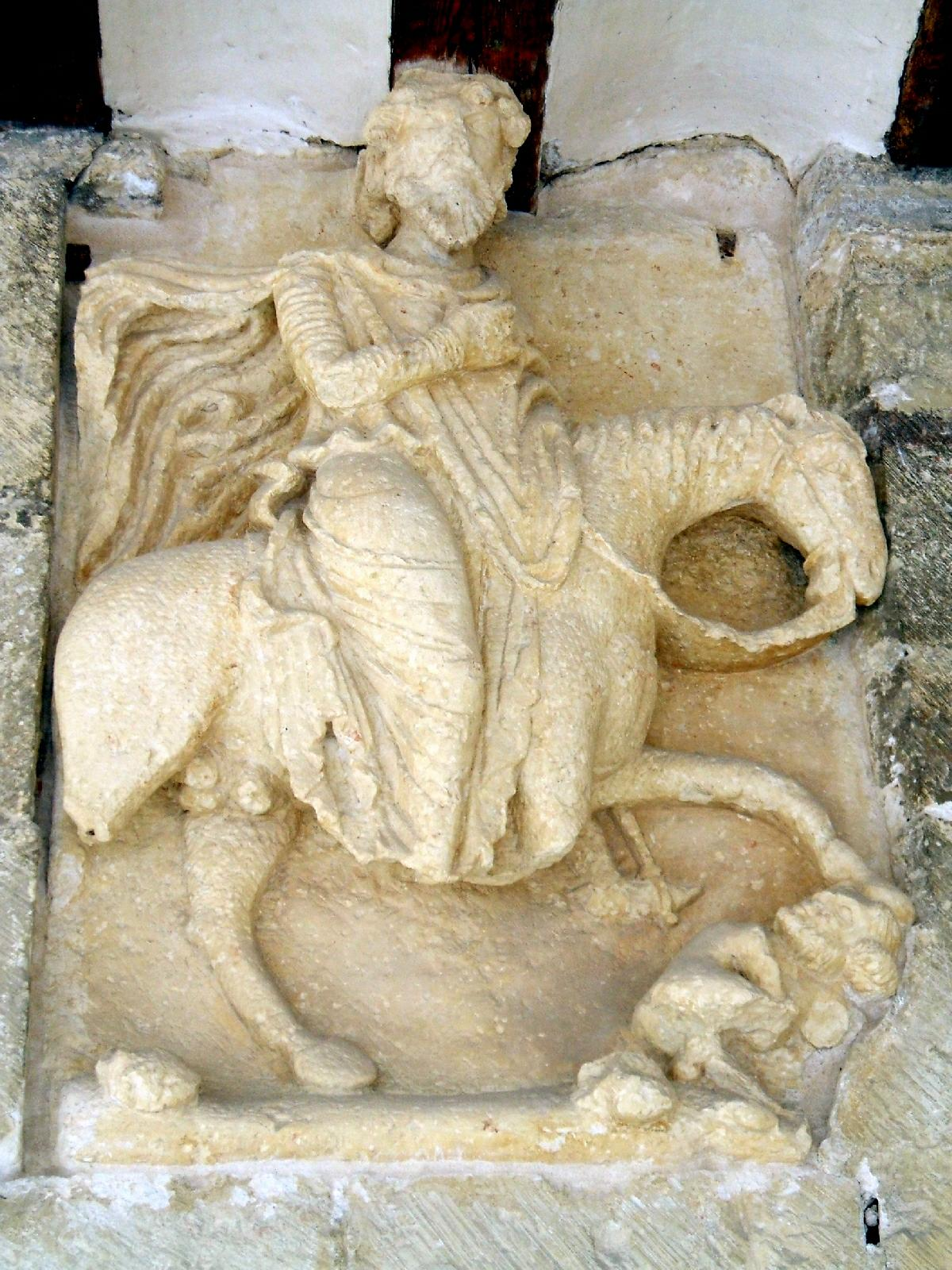
Relief of the victorious knight

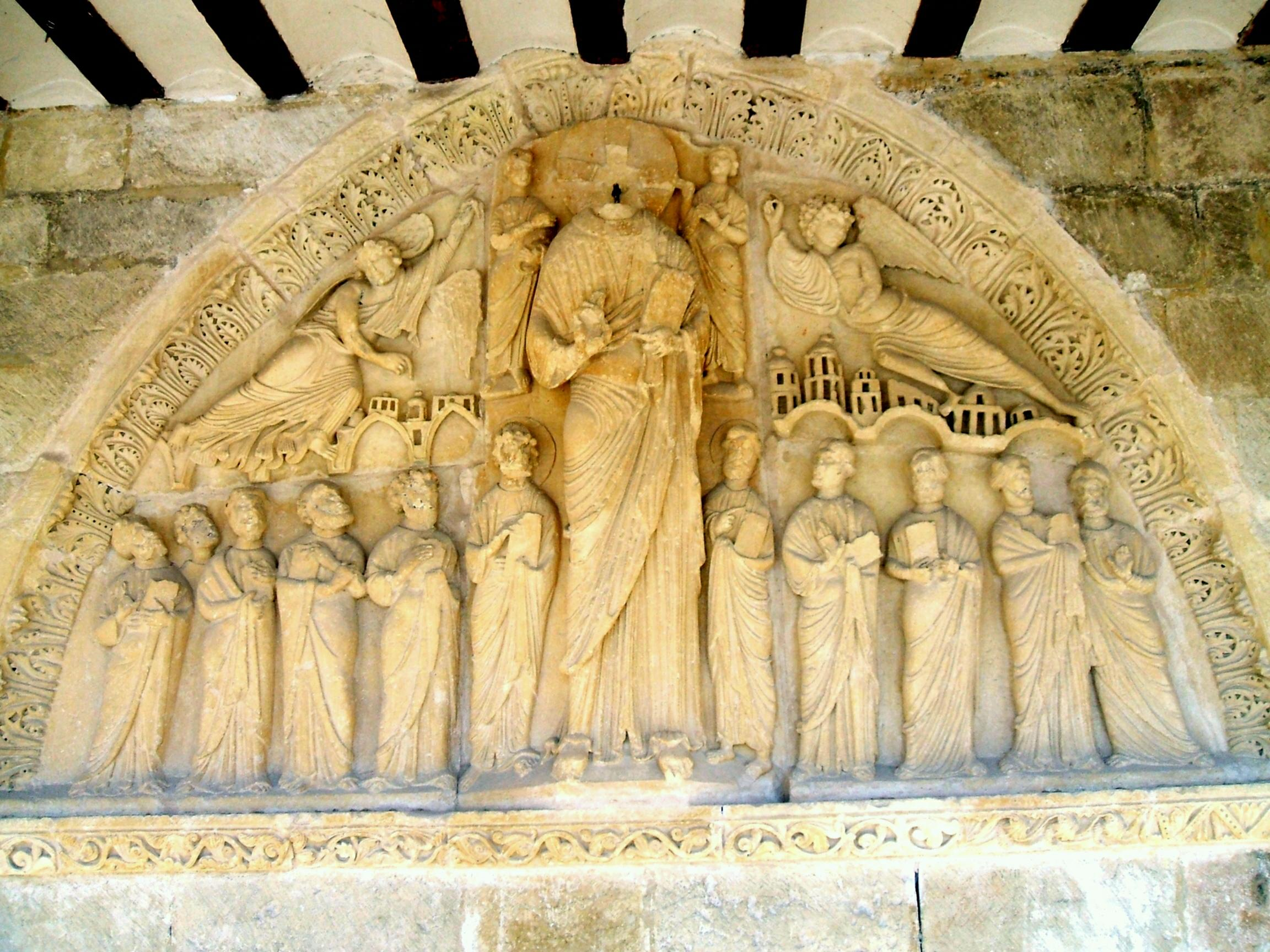
Tympanum of the Ascension of Jesus

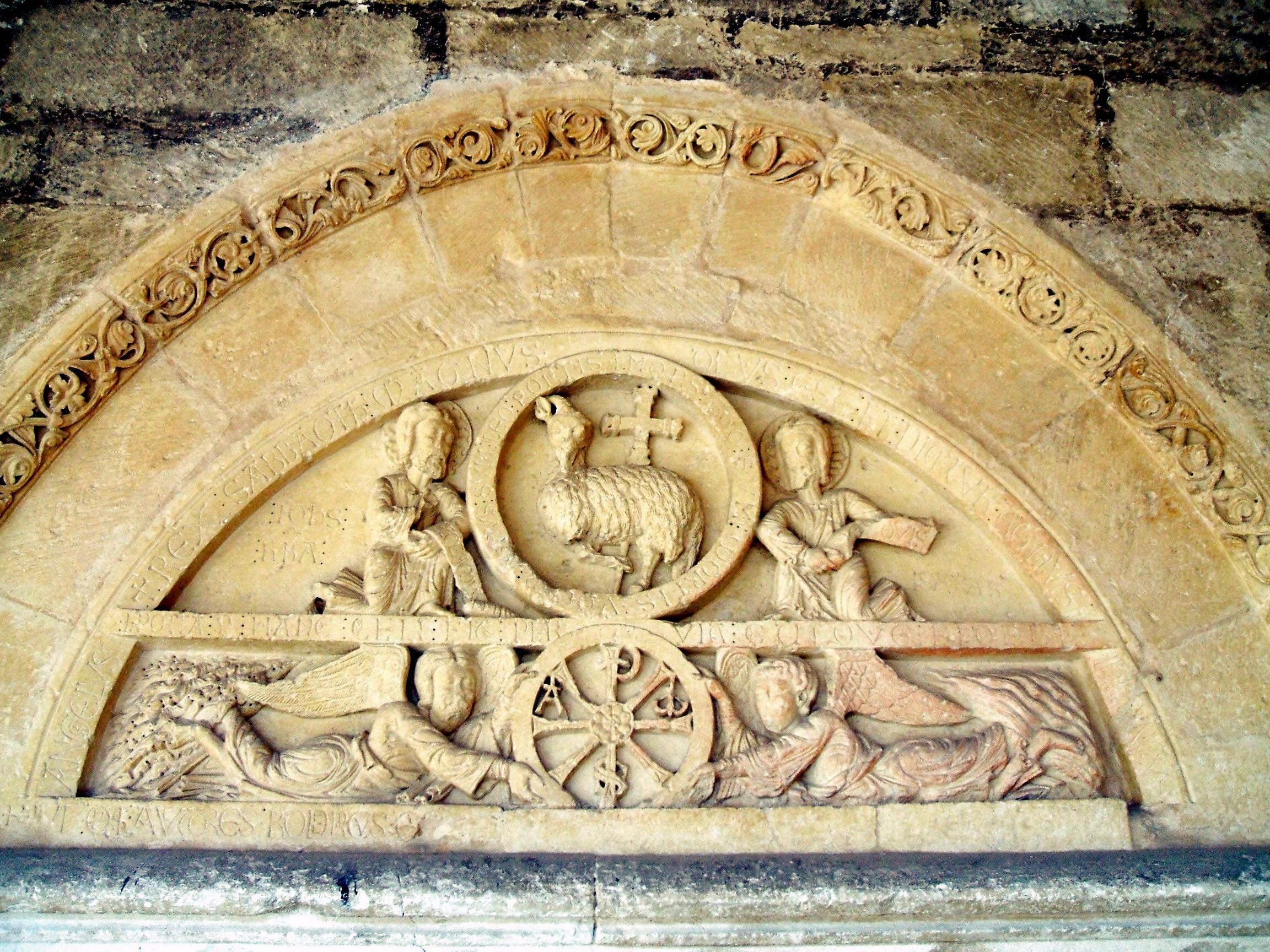
Tympanum of the Lamb

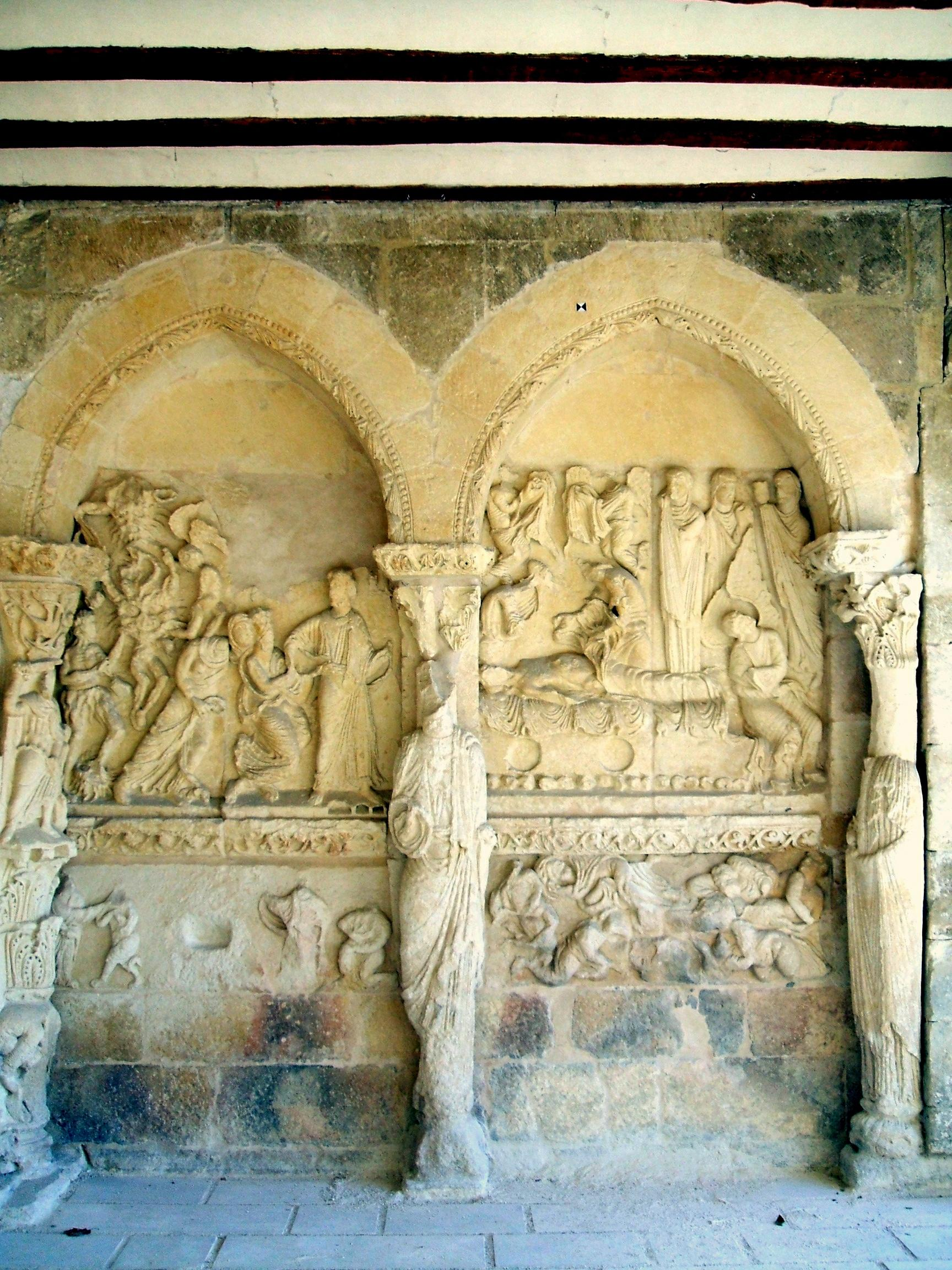
Reliefs depicting the Resurrection of Jesus and the Lamentation of Christ

The Basilica contains the image of Saint Prudentius, Bishop of Tarazona and patron saint of Álava from 1644, who according to tradition was born in Armentia. On April 28 each year, a procession and open-air festival are held on the meadows that surround the church in his honor.
