= Saint Prudentius =

Saint Prudentius may refer to:

- Prudentius of Tarazona (6th century), Spanish anchorite and bishop
- Prudentius of Troyes (9th century), French chronicler and bishop
