= Church of San Vicente Mártir, Vitoria-Gasteiz =

Church in Vitoria-Gasteiz, Spain

Church of San Vicente Mártir
- Iglesia de San Vicente Mártir (Spanish) San Bizente eliza (Basque)
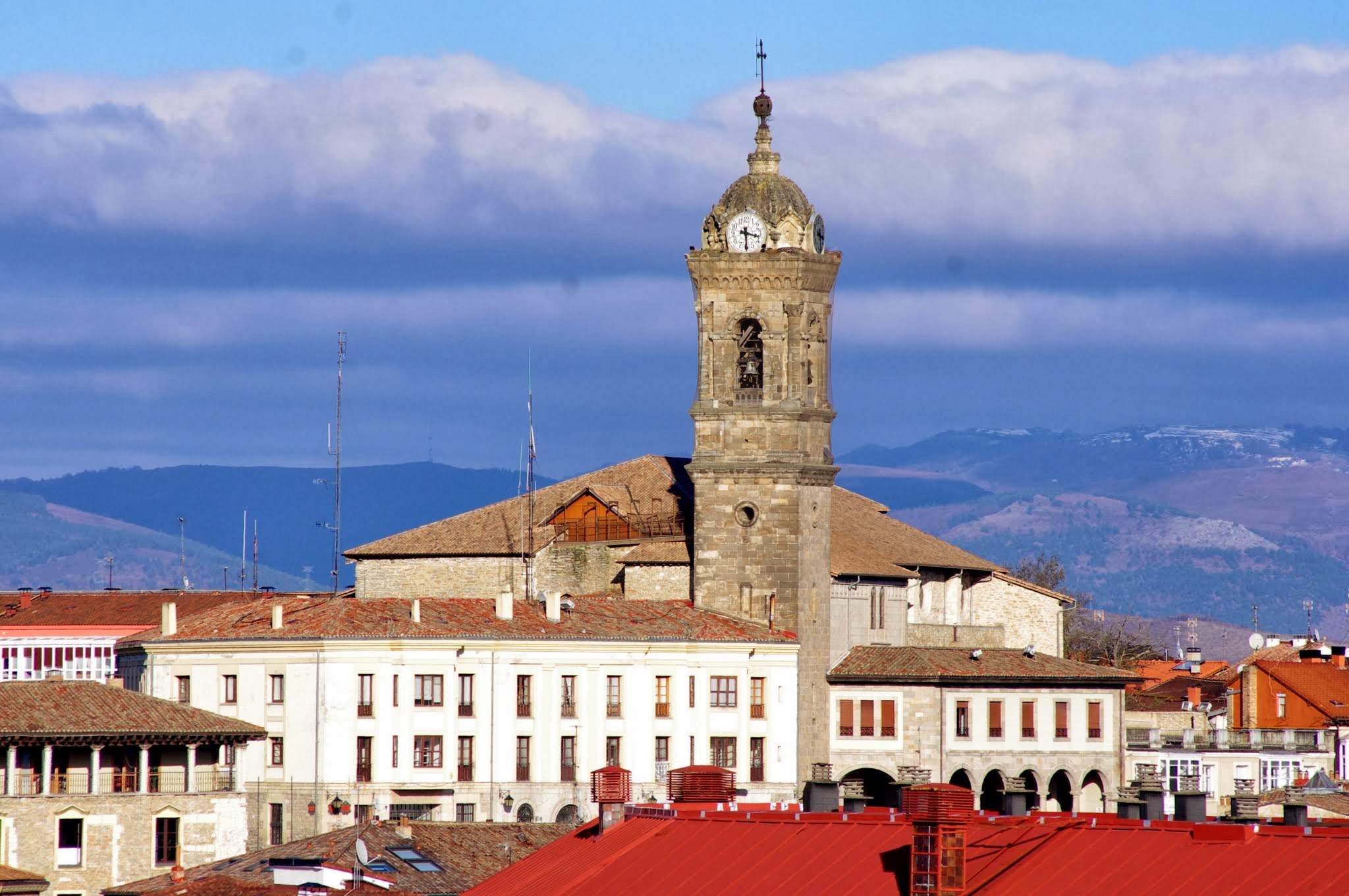
- View from the nearby Church of San Miguel
- Church of San Vicente Mártir
- 42.8475°N 2.671389°W
- Location: Vitoria-Gasteiz, Álava, Basque Country
- Country: Spain
- Denomination: Catholic Church
- Tradition: Latin Church

History
- Status: Parish church

Architecture
- Style: Gothic, Renaissance, Neo-Byzantine

Administration
- Archdiocese: Archidiocese of Burgos
- Diocese: Diocese of Vitoria

Spanish Cultural Heritage
- Official name: Iglesia de San Vicente Mártir
- Type: Non-movable
- Criteria: Monument
- Designated: 1984
- Reference no.: RI-51-0005102

The Church of San Vicente Mártir (Spanish: Iglesia de San Vicente Mártir, Basque: San Bizente eliza) is a church located in Vitoria-Gasteiz, Basque Country, Spain. It was declared Bien de Interés Cultural in 1984.

The church is named after Saint Vincent of Saragossa, a 4th century martyr. The church was built in the late 15th and early 16th centuries. The current tower, of Neo-Byzantine style, was finished in 1872.
