= Lazarraga Palace =

Palace in Zalduondo, Basque Country, Spain

- Lazarragatarren jauregia (Basque); Palacio Lazarraga (Spanish)
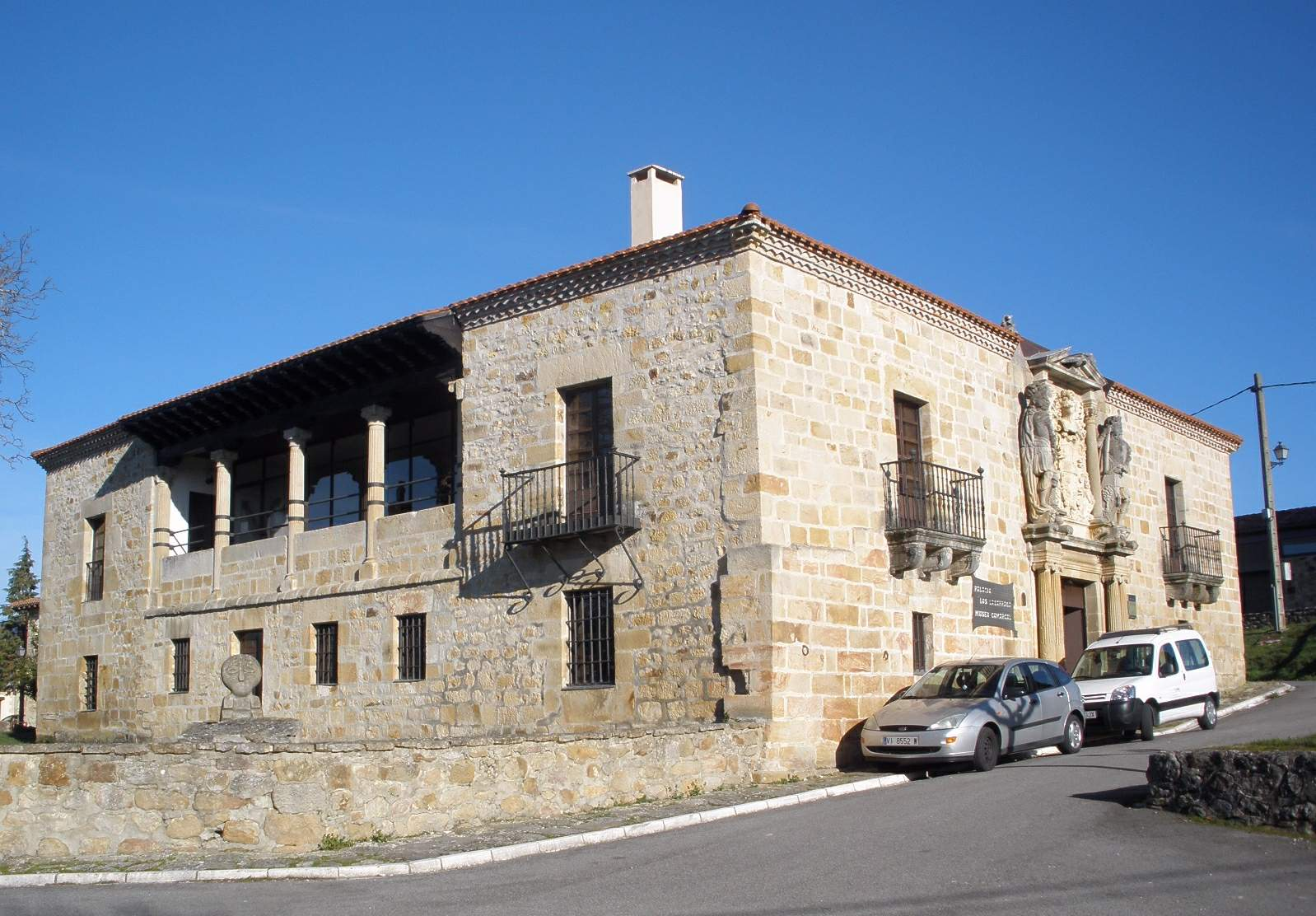
- View of the palace
- Interactive map of the Lazarraga Palace area

General information
- Location: Zalduondo, Álava, Basque Country, Spain
- Coordinates: 42.885858°N 2.346977°W
- Construction started: 16th century

Spanish Cultural Heritage
- Official name: Palacio Lazarraga
- Type: Non-movable
- Criteria: Monument
- Designated: 1984
- Reference no.: RI-51-0005125

Basque Cultural Heritage
- Criteria: Monument complex
- Designated: 29 October 2002
- Part of: Camino de Santiago

The Lazarraga Palace (Basque: Lazarragatarren jauregia, Spanish: Palacio Lazarraga) is a palace located in Zalduondo, Álava, Basque Country, Spain. It was declared Bien de Interés Cultural in 1984. The palace, located next to the parish church, was built in the 16th century. It is notable for the large coat of arms in its façade, as well as for a well-preserved Mannerist mural painting.
