= Ozaeta =

Village in Álava, Spain

- Concejo
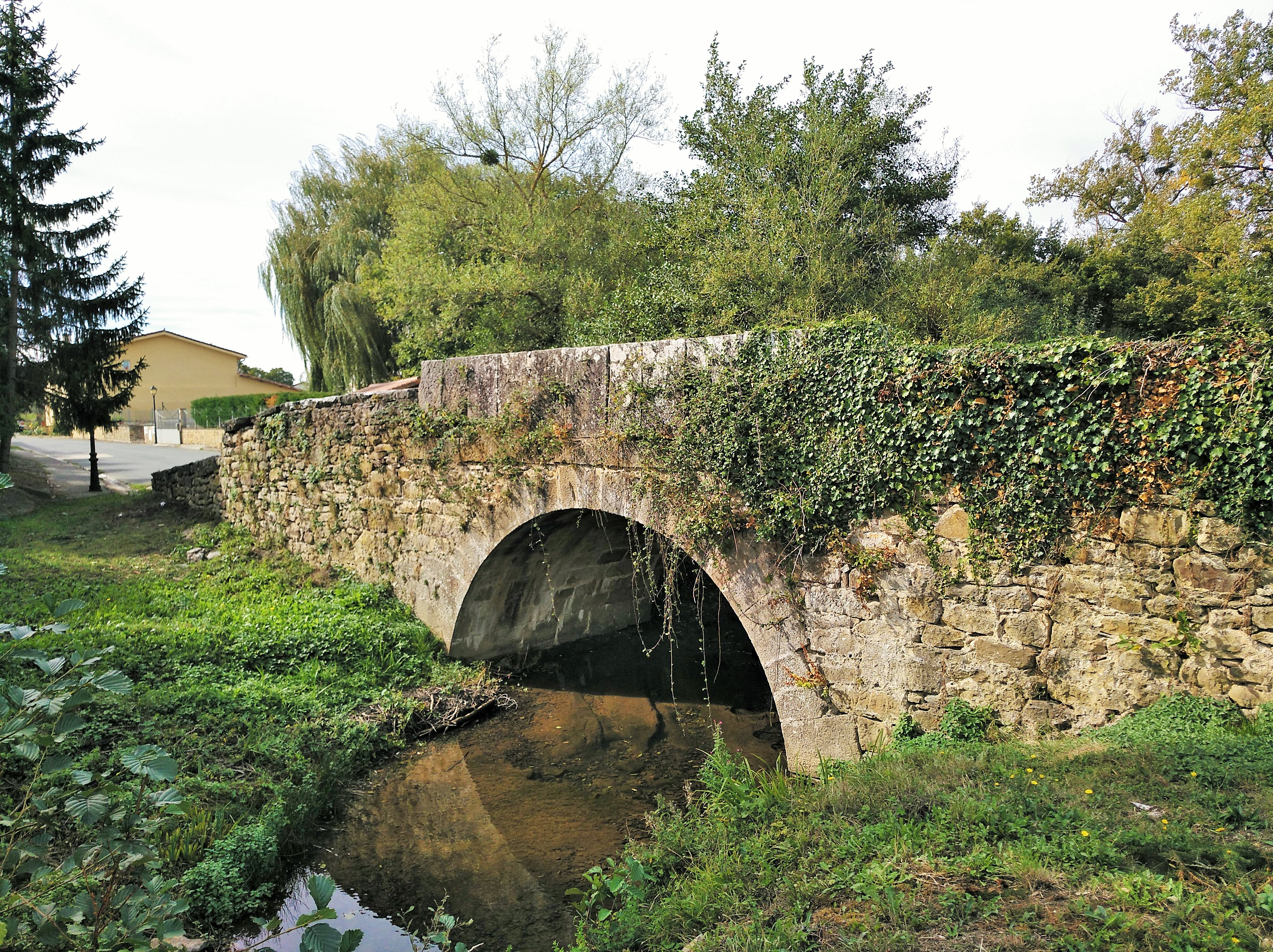

- Location within Álava Location within the Basque Country Location within Spain
- Coordinates: 42°55′N 2°30′W
- Country: Spain
- Autonomous community: Basque Country
- Province: Álava
- Comarca: Llanada Alavesa
- Municipality: Barrundia
- Elevation: 578 m (1,896 ft)

Population (2022)
  - Total: 217
- Postal code: 01206

Ozaeta (Basque: Ozeta) is a village and concejo in Álava, Basque Country, Spain. It is the capital of the municipality of Barrundia.
