= Guevara, Spain =

Concejo in Álava, Spain

Gebara
- Concejo
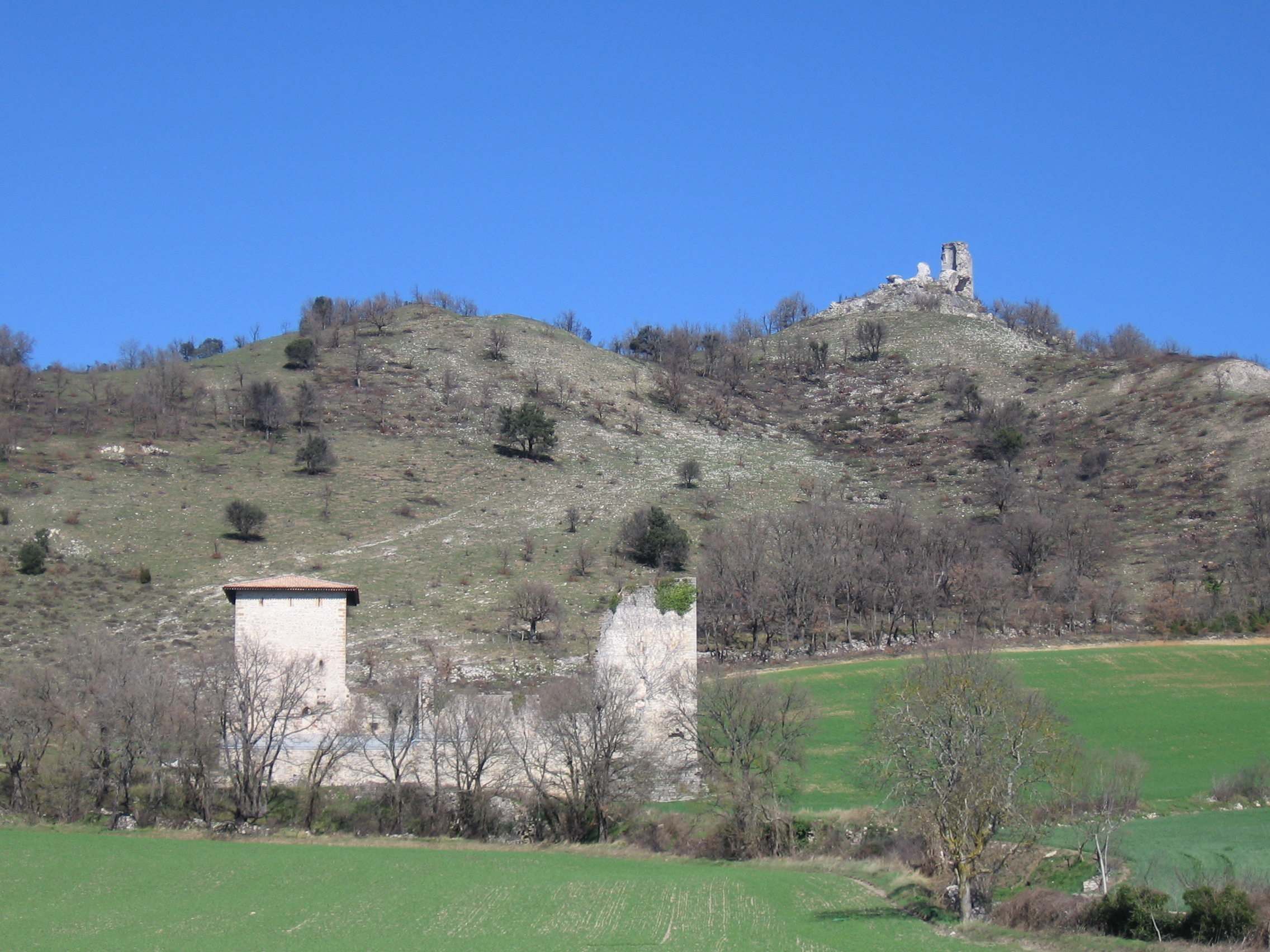
- The palace and ruins of the castle

- Coat of arms

- Location within Álava Location within the Basque Country Location within Spain
- Coordinates: 42°53′37″N 2°30′41″W
- Country: Spain
- Autonomous community: Basque Country
- Province: Álava
- Comarca: Llanada Alavesa
- Municipality: Barrundia

Area
  - Total: 3.11 km^{2} (1.20 sq mi)
- Elevation: 551 m (1,808 ft)

Population (2023)
  - Total: 64
  - Density: 21/km^{2} (53/sq mi)
- Postal code: 01206

Gebara (Spanish: Guevara) is a hamlet and concejo in the municipality of Barrundia, Álava, Basque Country, Spain. It is a former municipality located on the banks of the Zadorra river.

== History ==
The origins of Gebara are uncertain. Koldo Mitxelena and Joaquín Gorrochategui have suggested that the toponyms Gébala (Γέβαλα) and Gabálaika (Γαβάλαικα) mentioned in Ptolemy's works as cities of the Varduli could correspond to modern Gebara.

Records are mute during the early Middle Ages, with the first mention occurring in a document from the 11th century about the counts of Oñati. Gebara played an important role during the War of the Bands of the late Middle Ages as the stronghold of the Ladrón de Guevara family. It was during this time that the castle was built. Located on top of a hill, the castle was destroyed during the First Carlist War. The Tower-palace of Guevara is located at the foot of the hill, close to the Church of the Assumption.

The Brotherhood of Gebara (Spanish: Hermandad de Guevara) formerly administered the village of Gebara, as well as Elgea, Etura and Urizar. After the municipal reforms of the 19th century, the old brotherhood was converted into a municipality. By 1887, the municipality had been merged into Barrundia.
