= Villanañe =

Village in Álava, Spain

- Concejo
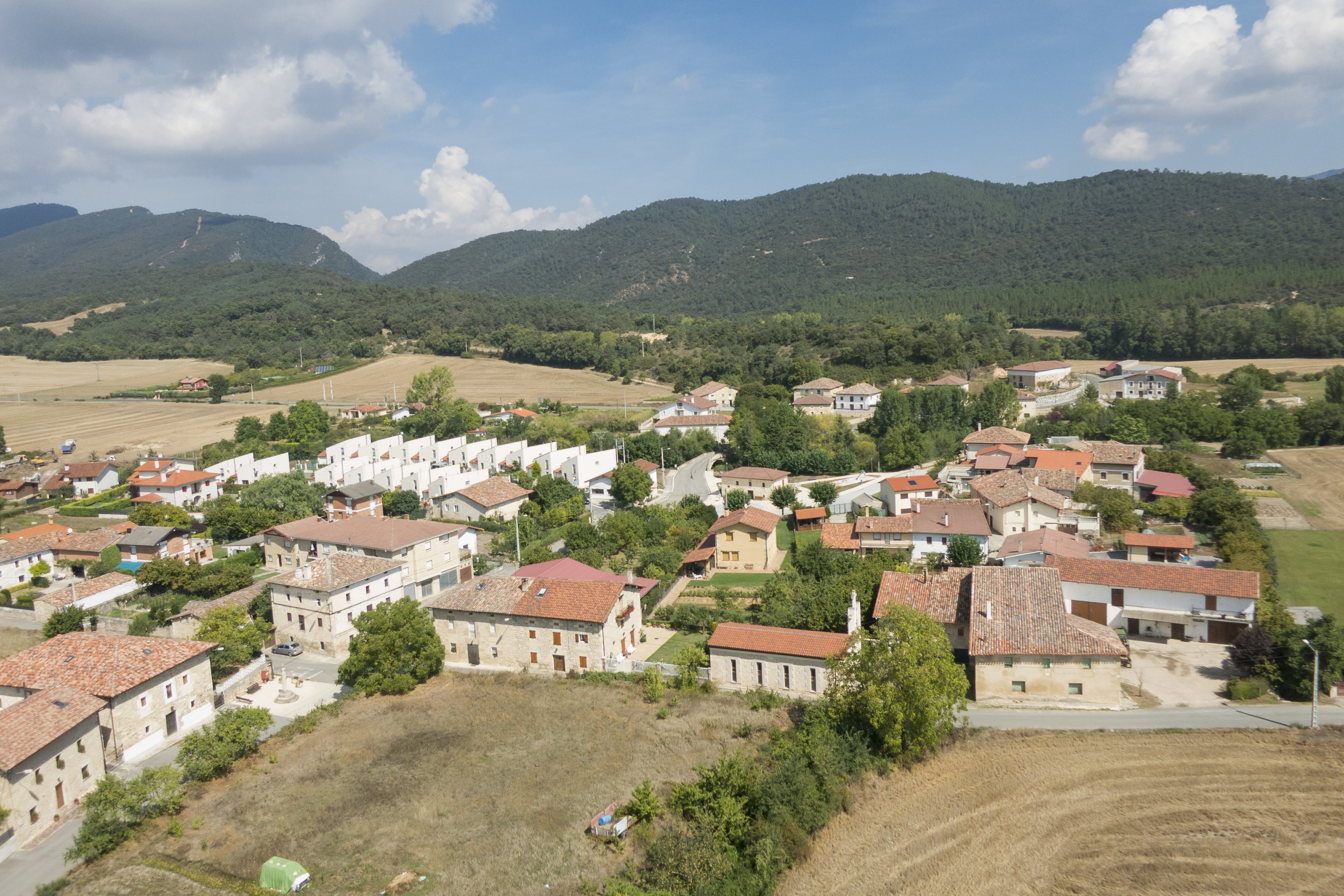

- Location within Álava Location within the Basque Country Location within Spain
- Coordinates: 42°48′N 3°06′W
- Country: Spain
- Autonomous community: Basque Country
- Province: Álava
- Comarca: Añana
- Municipality: Valdegovía/Gaubea

Area
  - Total: 7.21 km^{2} (2.78 sq mi)
- Elevation: 551 m (1,808 ft)

Population (2023)
  - Total: 113
  - Density: 15.7/km^{2} (40.6/sq mi)
- Postal code: 01426

Villanañe is a village and concejo in the municipality of Valdegovía/Gaubea, in Álava province, Basque Country, Spain. The Tower of Villanañe is located in the concejo.
