= Prudencio Ortiz de Rozas =

Argentine general

General Prudencio Ortiz de Rozas
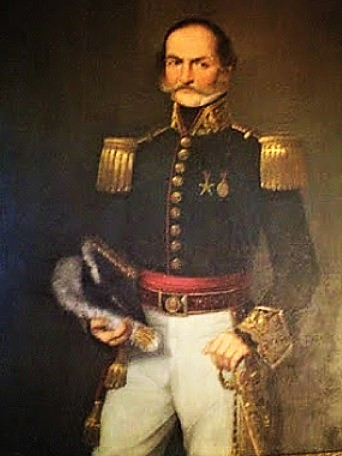
- portrait of Prudencio Ortiz de Rozas by Juan Álvarez

Personal details
- Born: Prudencio Domingo del Corazón de Jesús Ortiz de Rozas y López de Osornio; 1800 Buenos Aires, Argentina
- Died: 1857 (aged 56–57) Seville, Spain
- Resting place: La Recoleta Cemetery
- Party: Partido Federal
- Spouse(s): Catalina Almada; Etelvina Romero
- Occupation: army landowner merchant
- Profession: military man

Military service
- Allegiance: (Argentina) United Provinces of the River Plate; Argentine Confederation
- Years of service: c. 1824–1845
- Rank: General
- Commands: Regimiento 3° de Milicia Activa de Caballería; Regimiento 6° de Milicias de Caballería de Campaña
- Battles/wars: Batalla de las Vizcacheras; Batalla del Puente de Márquez; Batalla de San José de Flores; Revolución de los Restauradores; Batalla de Chascomús

Prudencio Ortiz de Rozas (April 28, 1800 – June 1, 1857) was an Argentine general, brother of governor Juan Manuel de Rosas. He fought at the Battle of Márquez Bridge and battle of San José de Flores, and took part in the agreements of Rosas and Juan Lavalle in Cañuelas and Barracas. He took part in the battle of Chascomús, that defeated the Freemen of the South.
