= San Prudencio festival =

Saint's feast day celebration in Spain

San Prudencio festival San Prudentzioko jaiak
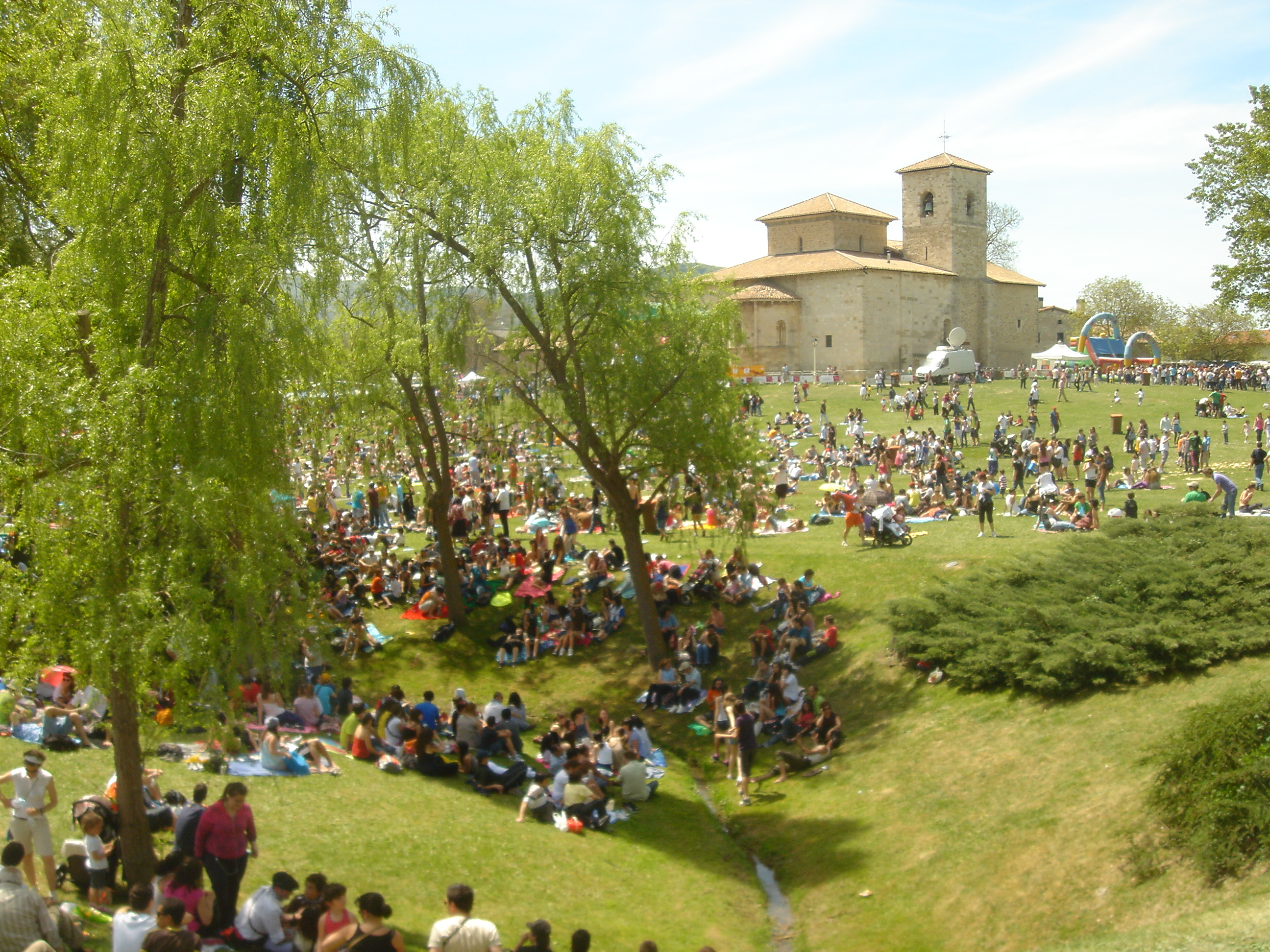
- The festival in Armentia
- Status: Active
- Genre: Religious festival
- Begins: 27 April
- Ends: 28 April
- Frequency: Annually
- Locations: Vitoria-Gasteiz and Armentia, Álava
- Country: Spain

The San Prudencio festival (Basque: San Prudentzioko jaiak), in the city of Vitoria-Gasteiz, Álava, Spain, is held in honour of Saint Prudentius around the saint's feast day (28 April). Due to its popularity, the city organizes a number of activities. The festival begins on 27 April in Plaza de la Diputación, where a stage is prepared for the traditional Basque dance groups.

== Saint Prudentius ==
=== Patron saint ===
Saint Prudentius, the patron saint of Álava, was an anchorite and priest who became bishop of Tarazona. He was named the patron saint of Álava in the mid-17th century. Prudencio is believed to have been born in Armentia and died in El Burgo de Osma, Soria on 28 April; the year is unknown.

He was born and raised in Armentia, a small village which is now within the municipality of Vitoria-Gasteiz. When he was 15, he became an anchorite. When he removed to Calahorra, he is believed to have performed miraculous cures and converted many people to Christianity. He moved to Tarazona and succeeded the previous bishop.

Prudentius was reportedly canonized on 24 April 759 at the monastery of San Millán de la Cogolla. On 18 November 1643, he was named the patron saint of the province of Álava.

== Basilica ==
The Basilica of San Prudencio de Armentia is in the southern suburbs of Vitoria-Gasteiz. Built in the late 12th century and remodeled during the 18th, it was listed as a Bien de Interés Cultural on 4 June 1931. The basilica was renovated between 1773 and 1776, replacing its 12th-century façade and walls. In 1979, its name was changed from San Andrés to San Prudencio.

== Festival ==
Álava organizes several activities for the two-day festival, which begins on 27 April. The Retreta opens the festival on the night of 27 April in the Plaza de la Diputación, where a tamborrada similar to the Tamborrada in San Sebastián takes place with trumpets, drums and Basque dance groups. According to a local newspaper, the first tamborrada connected with the San Prudencio festival was held in 1975; the festival itself has been held since at least 1964.

The following day, a fair is held with traders and craftsmen. A popular song is sung during the festival:

Spanish:

Suena el tun, tun y con él la trompeta,
Es la retreta de nuestro patrón. (Bis).
Los alaveses, en este día, con alegría y con buena unión.
Celebran fiestas a San Prudencio, a San Prudencio su patrón.
Suena el tun, tun y con el la trompeta,
Es la retreta de nuestro patrón. (Bis)

Basque:

Tuntunarekin turuten doinua
gure zaindariaren eguna (berriz)
Arabatarrok egun honetan,
elkartzen gara alaitasunez,
ospatutzeko Prudentzio jaia,
gure patroi handia.

San Prudencio's Zortzikoa:

Buenas tortillas de perretxikos
Con huevos frescos y buen jamón
Que son los útiles más convenientes
Para este día de animación
Arriba todos los alaveses
De alma sencilla y buen corazón
Celebren fiestas a San Prudencio
A San Prudencio que es su patrón

== Gallery ==
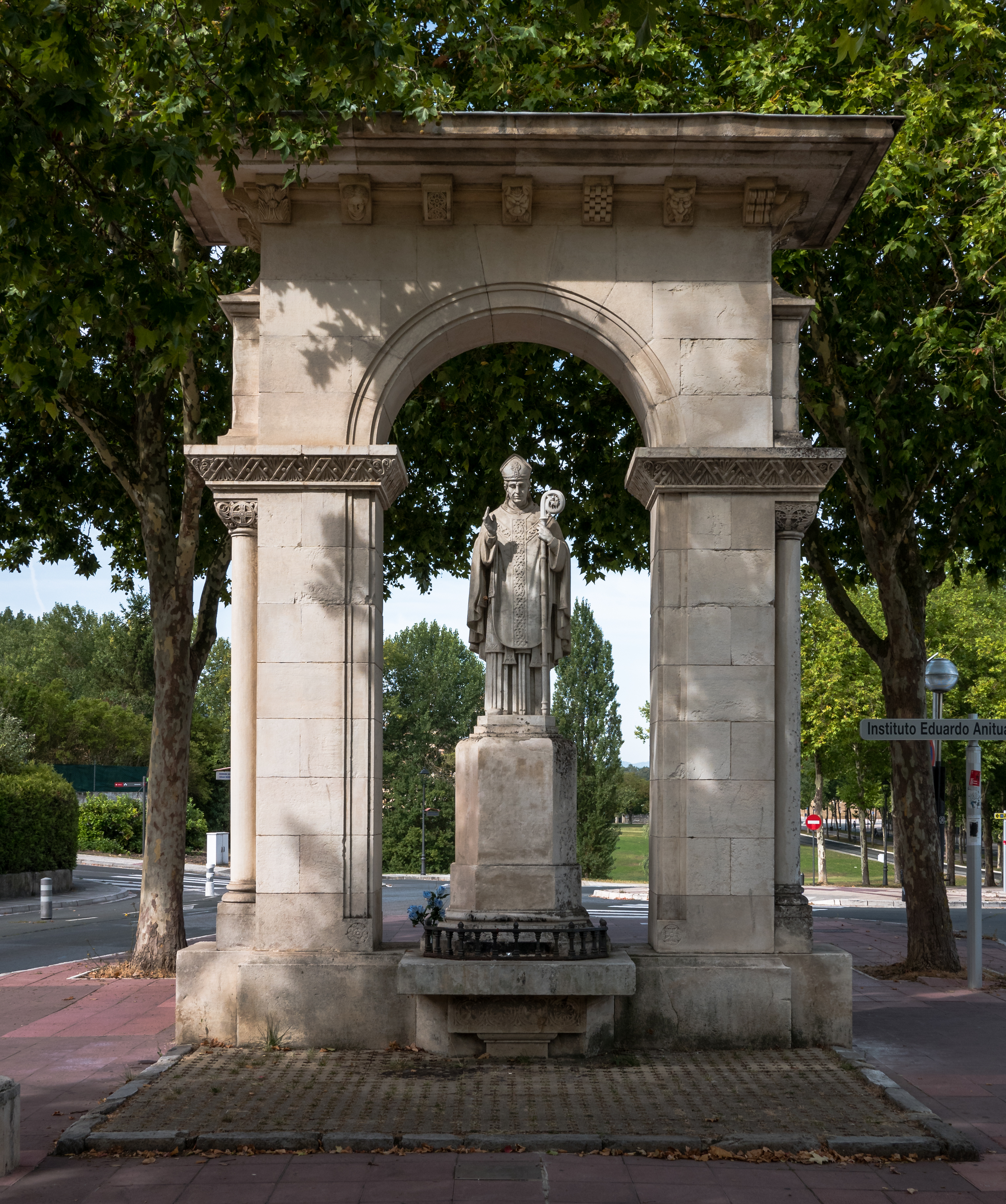
Statue of Saint Prudentius

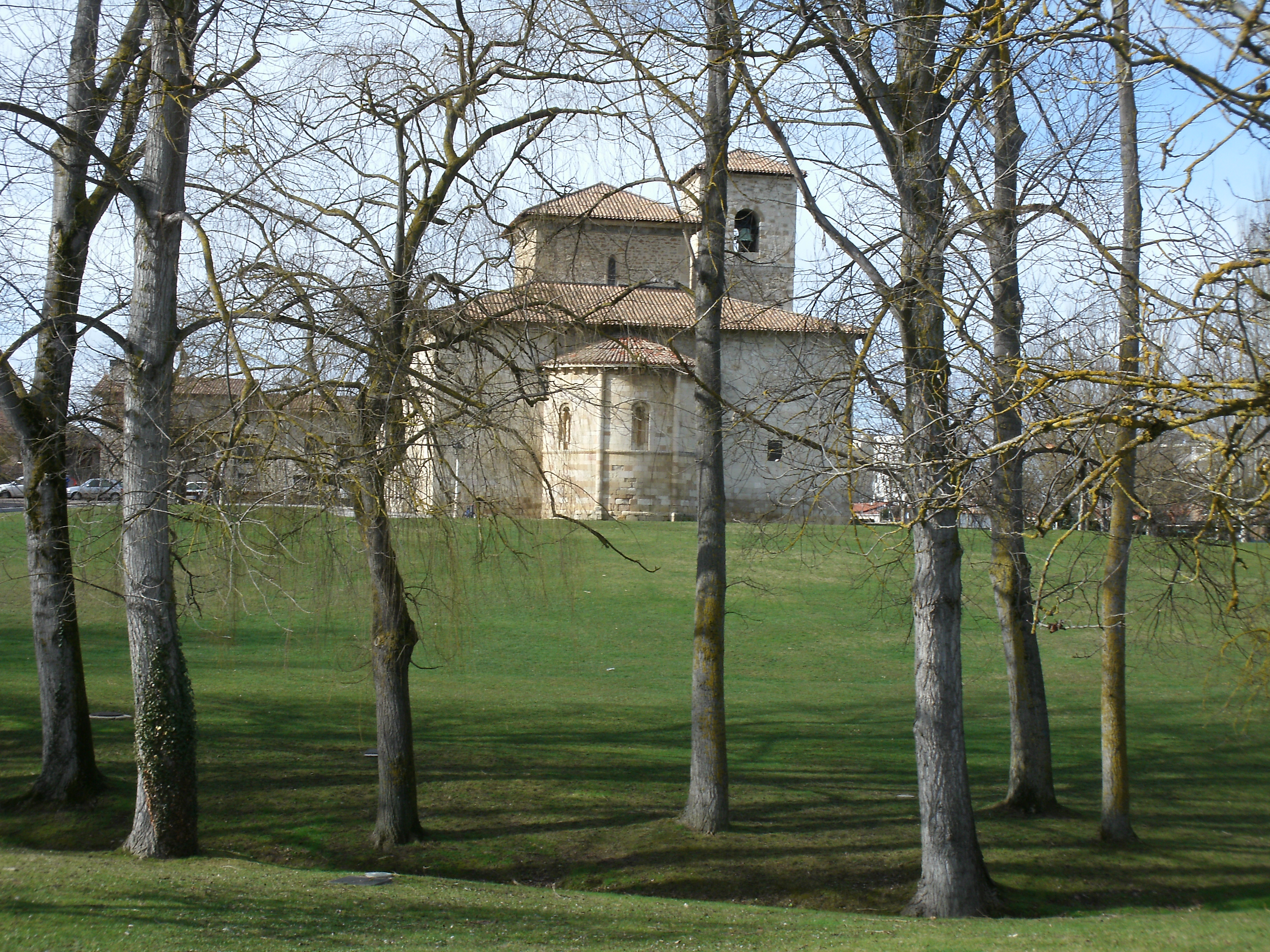
Basilica of San Prudencio

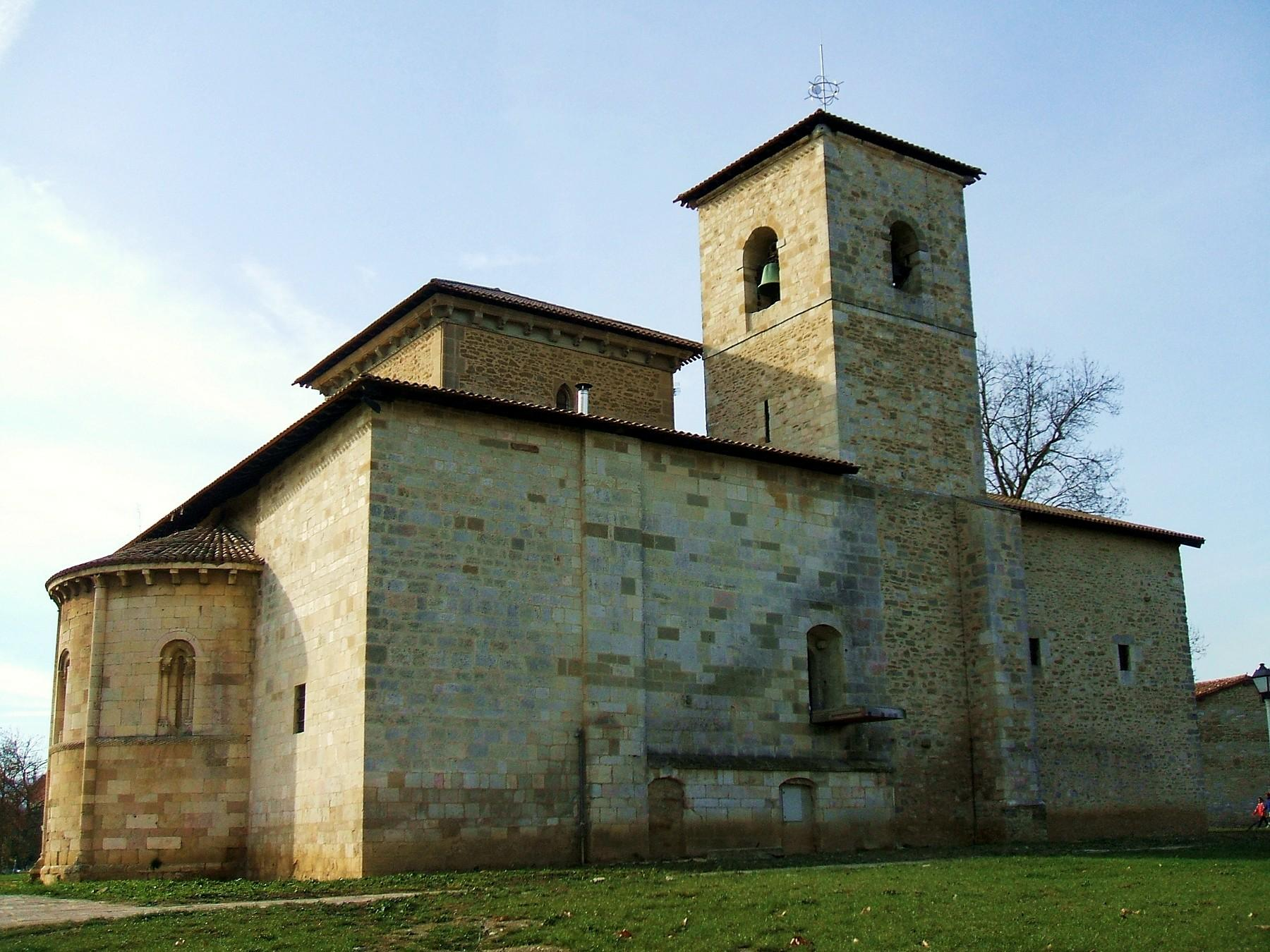
Panorama of the basilica

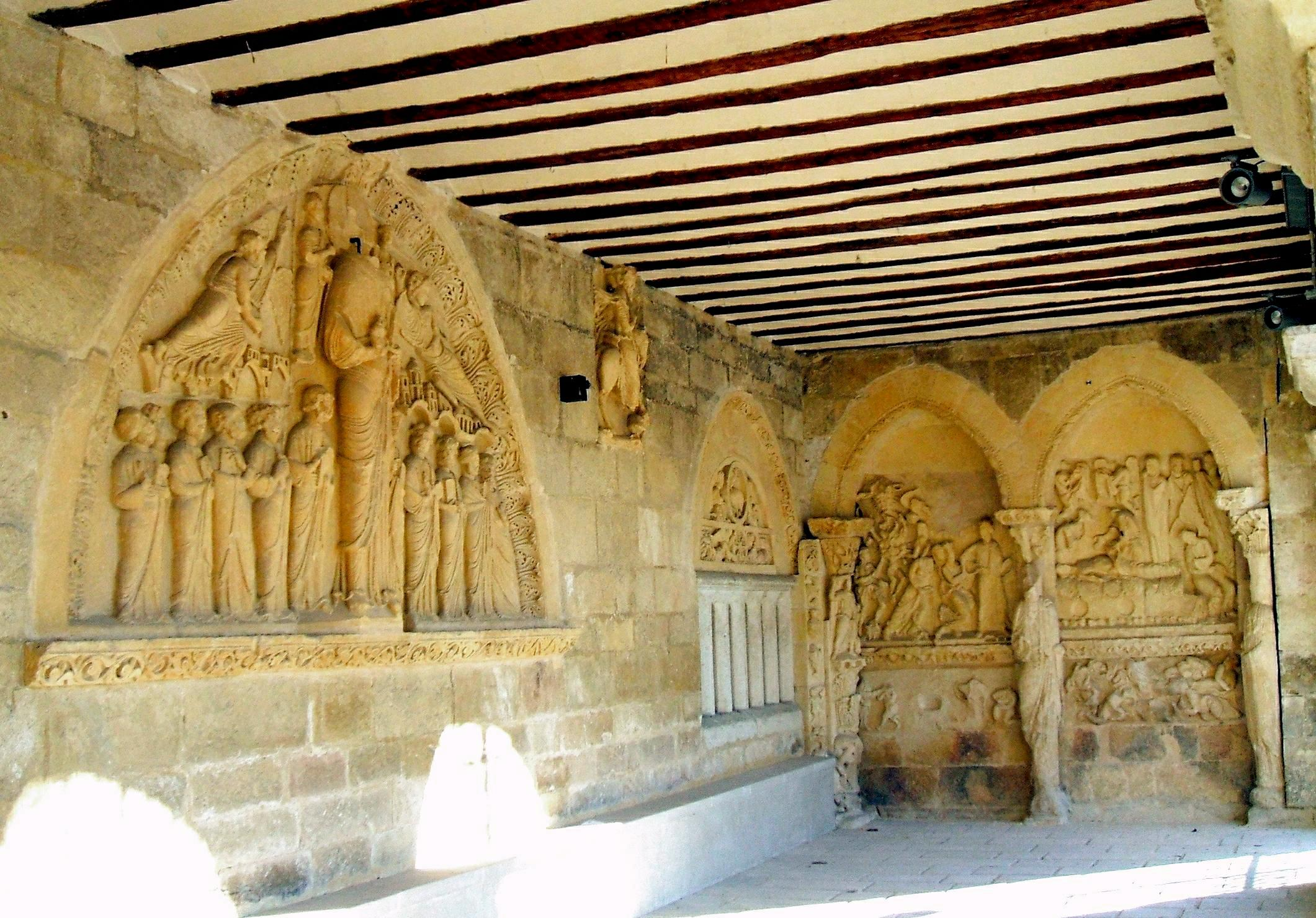
Interior view

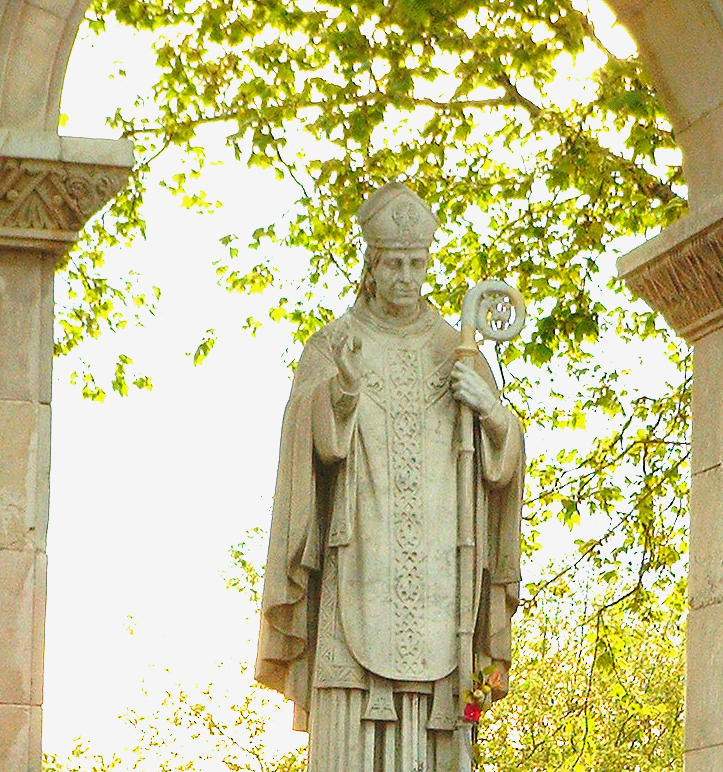
Close-up of the San Prudencio statue

== Sources ==
- "San Prudencio de Armentia". (in Spanish)
- "Fiestas y Romería de San Prudencio en Vitoria-Gasteiz". deVitoria.es. Archived from the original on 2 August 2011. (in Spanish)
- "De 'La comida del Gargantúa' a la primera Tamborrada". elcorreo.com (in Spanish). Archived from the original on 2 April 2015.
- "Armentia recibe a los alaveses". elcorreo.com. (in Spanish)
