= Martioda =

Hamlet in Álava

- Concejo
- Location within Álava Location within the Basque Country Location within Spain
- Coordinates: 42°52′30″N 2°46′46″W
- Country: Spain
- Autonomous community: Basque Country
- Province: Álava
- Comarca: Vitoria-Gasteiz
- Municipality: Vitoria-Gasteiz

Area
  - Total: 7.66 km^{2} (2.96 sq mi)
- Elevation: 535 m (1,755 ft)

Population (2022)
  - Total: 35
  - Density: 4.6/km^{2} (12/sq mi)
- Postal code: 01191

Martioda (Spanish: Mártioda) is a hamlet and concejo in the municipality of Vitoria-Gasteiz, in Álava province, Basque Country, Spain. The Hurtado de Mendoza tower, one of the most significant medieval structures in Álava, is located in Martioda.
