= José López Prudencio =

Spanish writer (1870–1949)

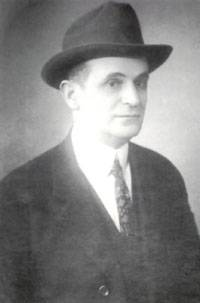
José López Prudencio

José López Prudencio (Badajoz, 11 November 1870 – Badajoz, September 1949) was a Spanish writer, essayist, journalist, and literary critic. He is regarded as one of the most significant public figures of Badajoz in the first half of the 20th century and was notable for his work in defending the cultural identity and regionalism of Extremadura.

== Early life and career ==
Born in Badajoz, López Prudencio became active in the literary and journalistic life of his hometown. He served as a municipal chronicler of Badajoz and was a corresponding academic of the Royal Spanish Academy24. His career included positions as a secondary school teacher and director of Colegio del Carmen.

== Literary work ==
López Prudencio was a prolific writer and played a prominent role in local journalism. He collaborated with and directed several regional newspapers, such as Noticiero Extremeño, Correo de la Mañana, and Correo Extremeño. His writings often dealt with the identity of Extremadura, and he is credited with being among the first writers to discuss the distinct cultural "race" of Extremadurans—an idea later developed by authors like Luis Chamizo and José María Gabriel y Galán.

=== Main works ===
El genio literario de Extremadura (1912), a study focused on the literary spirit and regional identity of Extremadura.

Diego Sánchez de Badajoz: Estudio crítico, biográfico y bibliográfico (1915), which received an award in a public competition by the Royal Spanish Academy.

Relieves antiguos (1925), notable for its historical research.

== Intellectual influence and cultural defense ==
López Prudencio's work emphasized the unique character of Extremadura, both in literature and society. He articulated this regional spirit by analyzing traditions, literary innovation, and the temperament of the people of Extremadura. His essays and literary criticism strengthened the sense of identity among local writers and intellectuals.

== Legacy ==
Recognized as one of the leading cultural figures of Extremadura, López Prudencio contributed to both the academic study and popular understanding of regional Spanish identity. His efforts as a chronicler, journalist, academic, and educator left a lasting mark on the cultural landscape of Badajoz.
