= Tower of Villanañe =

Tower of Varona
- Varona (Spanish)
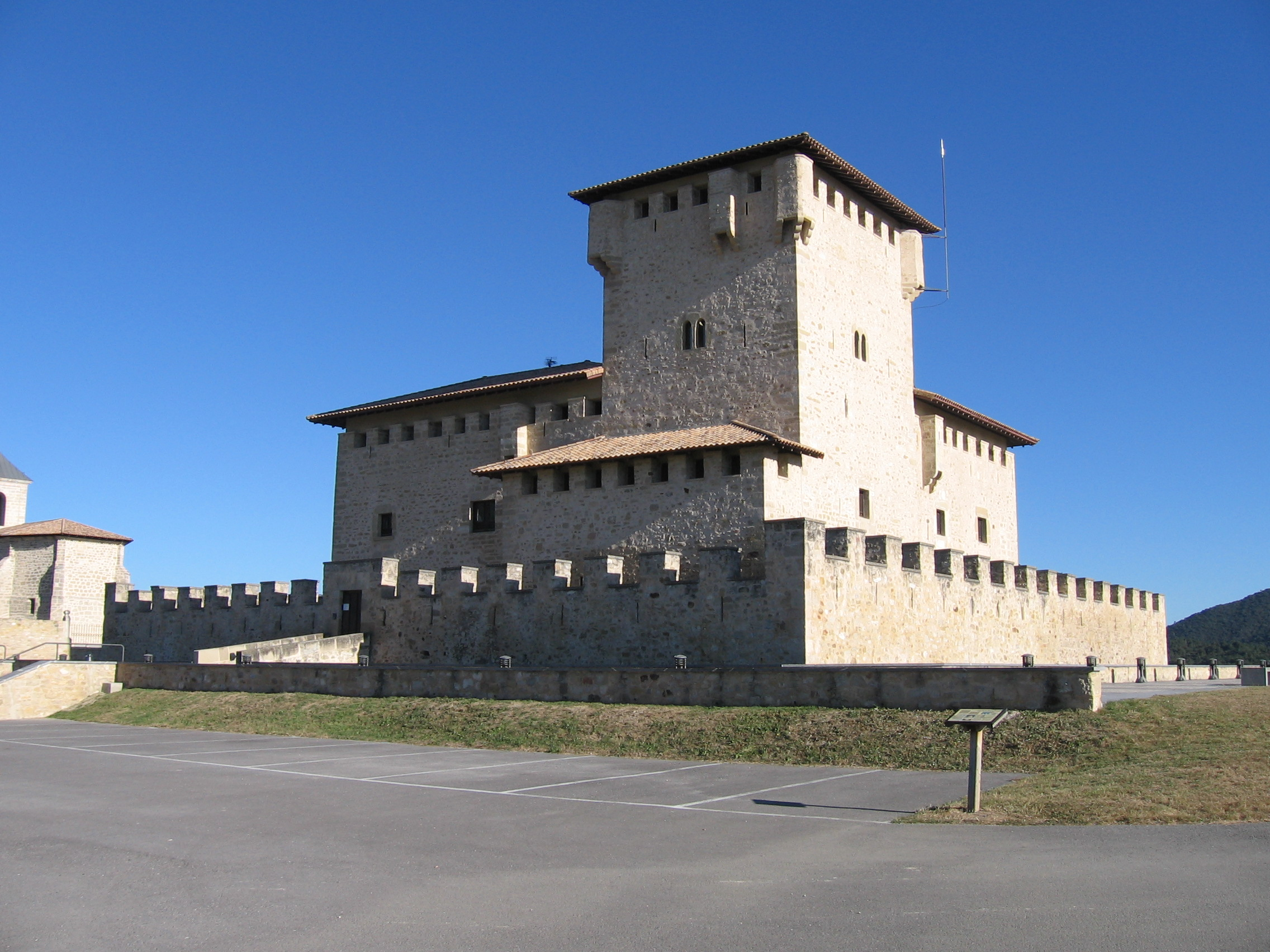

- Location within Spain
- 42.829732°N 3.07155°W
- Location: Villanañe, Spain

Spanish Cultural Heritage
- Official name: Torre de Varona
- Type: Non-movable
- Criteria: Monument
- Designated: 1984
- Reference no.: RI-51-0005121

The Tower of Varona (Spanish: Torre de los Varona) is a tower located in Villanañe, Valdegovia, Spain. It was declared Bien de Interés Cultural in 1984.

The origin of this tower dates back to the end of the 14th or start of the 15th century. The surname Varona dates back to the 7th century and came into being with Doña María Ruiz Pérez. From then until the present day, the tower has been inhabited by her direct descendants.

The whole building has been restored by the Provincial Council of Álava. Its interior has several areas that still retain their traditional character, and it is possible to see good examples of furniture throughout the various living rooms, which belongs to the owners of the Tower-Mansion. The wallpapers and the collection of ceramics are also very interesting.

The tower stands out on one side of the complex. The whole building is defended by a crenellated barbican and walls with arrow slits, as well as a wide moat filled with water.

== Description and characteristics ==
It is a masonry construction with ashlars in its corners. The first defensive level is formed by the wall and the moat (it is the only fortress in Alava that preserves its moat, although it is partially lost), with its bridges and gates. Inside, the two floors of the palace surround the tower on the north and west sides, while the entrance to the building is through the south door (it seems that in the past there was a lift access). There is another smaller door on the east side, which must have been used for storage.

The tower has a square floor plan, approximately 10 meters on each side. It consists of three floors and a tile roof of four waters, topped with battlements.

Its interior conserves several spaces that maintain their traditional character, being able to be seen distributed by the different rooms good examples of furniture, belonging to the owners of the Tower-Palace and to the Provincial Council of Alava. Of interest are the wallpapers and the collection of ceramics, and kutxak (chests) and pottery that house the different rooms.
