= Tower-palace of Guevara =

Palace in Barrundia, Basque Country, Spain

- Gebaratarren dorretxea (Basque); Torre-palacio de Guevara (Spanish)
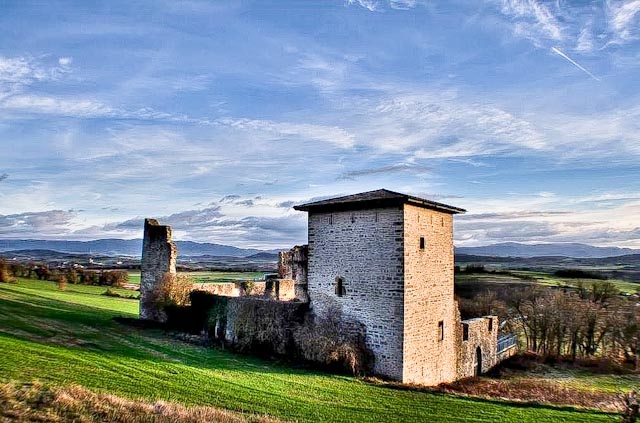
- View of the palace
- Interactive map of the Tower-palace of Guevara area

General information
- Location: Guevara, Barrundia, Álava, Basque Country, Spain
- Coordinates: 42°53′49″N 2°30′19″W

Spanish Cultural Heritage
- Official name: Torre-palacio de Guevara
- Type: Non-movable
- Criteria: Monument
- Designated: 17 July 1984
- Reference no.: RI-51-0005120

The Tower-palace of Guevara (Spanish: Torre-palacio de Guevara, Basque: Gebaratarren dorretxea) is a tower-palace located in Guevara, Álava, Basque Country, Spain. It was destroyed by the forces of Martín Zurbano during the First Carlist War. It was partially restored in 1964, and in 1984 it was declared Bien de Interés Cultural.
