= Agurain/Salvatierra =

Agurain / Salvatierra
- Municipality
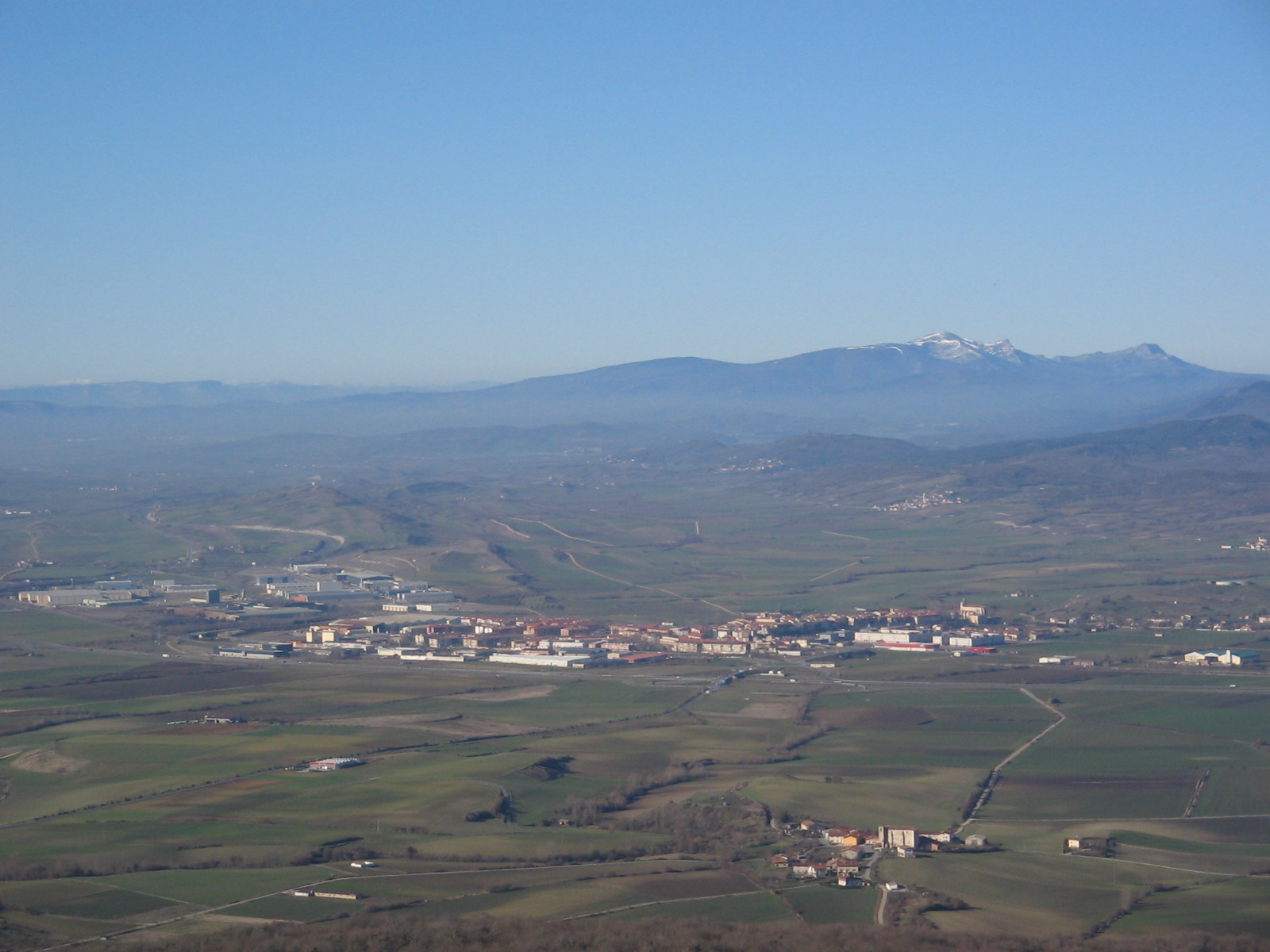

- Coat of arms

- Location of Agurain/Salvatierra within the Basque Country
- Coordinates: 42°51′09″N 2°23′22″W
- Country: Spain
- Autonomous community: Basque Country
- Province: Álava
- Eskualdea / Comarca: Llanada Alavesa
- Founded: 1256

Government
  - Mayor: Ernesto Sainz Lanchares (Basque Nationalist Party)

Area
  - Total: 37.77 km^{2} (14.58 sq mi)
- Elevation: 605 m (1,985 ft)

Population (2024)
  - Total: 5,155
  - Density: 136.5/km^{2} (353.5/sq mi)
- Demonym: Aguraindarra/Salvaterrano
- Time zone: UTC+1 (CET)
  - Summer (DST): UTC+2 (CEST)
- Postal code: 01200, 01207
- Official language(s): Basque, Spanish
- Website: Official website

Agurain in Basque or Salvatierra in Spanish, officially Agurain/Salvatierra, is a town and municipality located in the province of Álava in the Basque Autonomous Community, northern Spain. The municipality has a population of 5,155 inhabitants as of 2024 and is the most populous town in the cuadrilla of Llanada Alavesa.

The town council is headed by Iñaki Beraza, a member of the Basque Nationalist Party (EAJ-PNV).

== Geography ==
The municipality is located at the centre of the eastern Alavese Plains on a low ridge 605 metres above sea level. It comprises a core built-up area consisting of three historical streets running north to south, Zapatari, Mayor, and Carnicería, with ancient guild clusters on each. Two watercourses at the foot of the ridge, the Santa Barbara and Zadorra, historically outlined the town's north and west limits but are now increasingly absorbed by rapid urban development. Several old neighbourhoods, such as the Madura, La Magdalena, and San Jorge, are located outside the town's walls. In the 1950s and 1960s, a sprawl called La Moncloa developed on both sides of the road connecting the Portal del Rey (the main south entrance to the town) and the train station. The town continues growing east beside the Madura through new housing projects in the 2000s such as Harresi Parkea.

Villages in the vicinity of the municipality of Salvatierra include:

- Alangua
- Arrizala – home to the dolmen de Sorginetxe.
- Egileor
- Iturrieta – former village on a plateau, nowadays the site of an experimental farm; though not part of the municipality, it is sometimes included within it for statistical purposes.
- Opakua – at the foot of the mountain Arrigorrista, lends its name to a winding mountain pass.

The main road E-5 A-1 (Nacional I) passes by the town west to east en route to France.

== Economy ==
Salvatierra benefits from its location on the important European road axis N-1 E-5 E-80 and the Northern Railway. Following the construction of these routes, the town has developed industry since the early 20th century. Historically, the tanning factory Curtidos Salvatierra S.A.L. provided work for many inhabitants. As of 2008, the town has three industrial estates, two existing and a new one Litutxipi across from the train station, Agurain on the west (with PEM, formerly PUM Española, as its traditional flagship factory) and Galzar. The two latter industrial estates participate in a wider regional logistic scheme known as the Vitoria Logistic Corridor.

A solar power plant on the outskirts of town was inaugurated in 2007 and is currently the largest in the Basque Autonomous Community, with the goal of generating 350 MWh/year.

== History ==
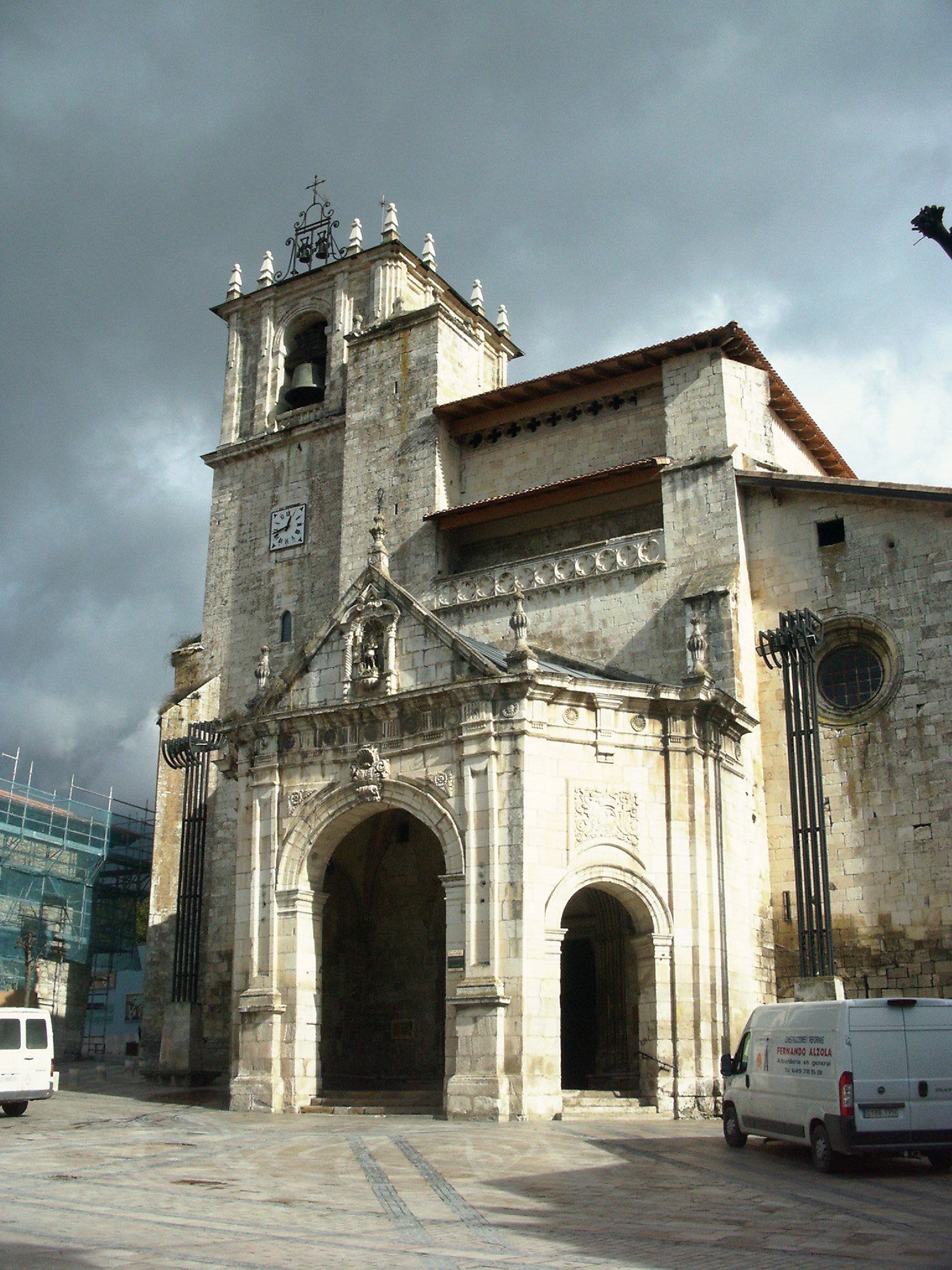
The San Juan church (2006)

=== Prehistory–13th century ===
Because of its location in the middle of a plain, Salvatierra has been an important crossroads as early as the Neolithic age, as evidenced by the presence of two important dolmens nearby. Most scholars locate the Roman manor Alba, a milestone in the Ab Asturica Burdigalam Roman road, in the nearby village of Albeniz; some others instead locate the manor in Salvatierra. The pass through the San Adrian tunnel and the plains around Salvatierra have evidence of prehistoric seasonal cattle migration, dolmens, and burial mounds. This route was used by the Romans and gained importance after the seizure of Gipuzkoa and Álava by the Kingdom of Castile.

=== 13–17th centuries ===
The town of Salvatierra was founded in 1256 by the Castilian king Alfonso X on the former village of Hagurahin on top of a hill, a highly defensible position. Castile sought to strengthen the territories bordering on the Kingdom of Navarre seized some decades prior. To strengthen these territories, and also to foster Castilian trade, the king founded various strongholds or free towns (salvas terras, seguras and villas francas) over the lands of Gipuzkoa and Álava en route to Gascony through the northern Way of St. James.

Salvatierra has experienced various conflicts because of its location bordering Navarre and its strategic position on the King's Highway to France. In the 13th century, the definitive layout of the town was established, with encircling walls and two large, fortified churches at the north and south ends (the churches of Santa María and San Juan, respectively). The olbeas were erected at this time too. These consisted of arcades, made originally of wood, next to both parishes in the marketplaces, and they have endured to the present, having been reconstructed in the 16th century.

The town thrived on its good location and trade along the Way of St. James, and it had a Jewish quarter located on today's Arramel St. In 1521, the town fended off the attack of its own lord, the Count of Salvatierra, who revolted against Emperor Charles V in the Revolt of the Comuneros. The Count failed to capture the town and was arrested and executed by imperial forces. Shortly afterward, the plague swept through the town, potentially causing the burning of Salvatierra on 1 August 1564, a disaster that some blame on a desperate attempt to end the epidemic. Almost the whole town was destroyed except for the walls and both main churches, a fact reflected in a poem by Basque writer Joan Perez de Lazarraga.

Salbatierra
egun ey dago tristeric
oyta dabela
eguiten asco negarric
çerren jarri da
guztia destruiduric
ez da gueratu
barruan ese galantic
çerca çabaloc
jarri ey dira bacarric
oy onezquero
ez da mercatu bearric (...) (Note: Translation: "Salbatierra / is presently sad / many are crying / since everything / has been ravaged / nothing splendid / remains inside / only the town walls / remain standing / after this / no need for a market (...).")

— Juan Pérez de Lazarraga

After the fire, a reconstruction ensued during the late 16th and early 17th centuries. Stately, walled homes, such as the Casa de los Diezmos on Carnicería St., were built in between the main streets. Construction slowed during the 18th century, but some works were constructed, including the pentagonal San Juan Church's baroque-style porch extending into the centre of the marketplace.

The use of the Way of St. James diminished with the construction of newer and more convenient roads, such as the one built through Salinas de Leniz in 1765, which proved more practical for carriages, resulting in traffic transferring to the latter. The diminished traffic later brought about some decay to Salvatierra.

=== 19th century–present ===
In 1820, a new road connected Salvatierra to Vitoria-Gasteiz and the Burunda corridor in Navarre.

During the First Carlist War, the walls were demolished to furnish a nearby fortress in Guevara, a key Carlist position, with proper material. In 1862, the railway connecting Madrid to the French border at Irun arrived in the town. Following the establishment of a railway station, the town expanded south out of its medieval nucleus along both sides of the road to the station and southwest of the N-1 road.

The town garnered attention at the height of the ETA terror attacks. On October 3, 1980, three unmasked gunmen murdered three Civil Motor Guard traffic officers: Corporal Avelino Palma Brioa, Constable Ángel Prado Mella, and Lance Corporal José Luis Vázquez Plata. The murders took place just minutes before the start of a cycling race that would have kicked off local Salvatierra fiestas. The murders received particular notoriety because the local priest, Ismael Arrieta Pérez de Mendiola, provided details to help the terrorists plan the attack. Father Ismael received 10 years in prison for each of the 3 murders (which the Supreme Court of Spain later reduced to 18 years).

== Demographics ==
The municipality has a population of 5,155 inhabitants as of 2024. In 1997, the gross income per family was 6,784 € compared to 8,258 € in the Basque Autonomous Community. In the cuadrilla as a whole, 10.36% of the workforce is employed in agriculture, 35.78% in the industry sector, 47.92% in the service sector, and 5.95% in the construction industry.

== Language ==
Spanish has been the dominant language in Salvatierra for at least the past 150 years. In 1841, an interpreter was required by the town council for Basque-speaking residents. In 1867, the geographer Elisée Reclus included the town within the boundaries of the Basque language area. Since the 1970s, younger generations that have attended Basque-language schools (called ikastolas) may speak or understand Basque.

== Features ==
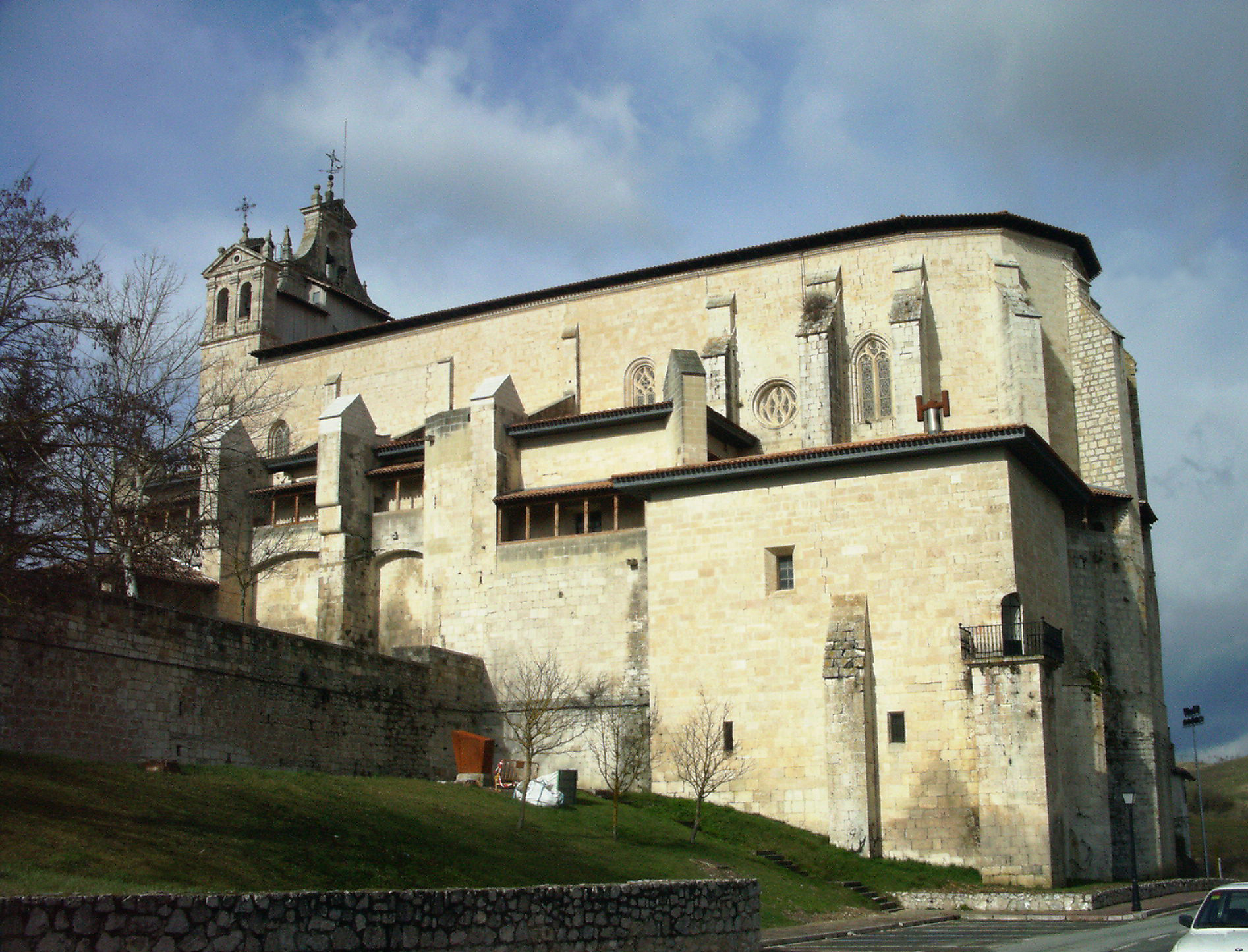
The Santa Maria church

- San Juan and Santa María churches: Due to the fortified nature of Salvatierra, the churches seal off the town's south and north entrances in a continuum with the town walls. As a result of their military purpose, the two churches have thick and stark walls, few windows, and outward corridors perched on their walls for the sentries. Their current construction dates from the 14th to early 16th century. They are both made in late Gothic style and distributed in three naves.
- Dolmen de Sorginetxe: This dolmen was constructed in the Neolithic and is located north of Arrizala, not far from another dolmen, Aizkomendi, which is located northeast of Salvatierra in the village of Eguilaz. These dolmens, used as burial monuments, were arguably situated at crossroads. The area, especially the cavern of Lezao, hosts tales of witches and spells, and the dolmen's name means 'witch house' in Basque.
- Olbeas of San Juan: The present-day arcade sloping up south to north dates to the 16th century, being rebuilt after the fire. Some of its columns are made of wood. A marketplace has been held there every Tuesday since the town charter was granted in 1256.
