= Church of Santa María, Agurain/Salvatierra =

Church in Agurain/Salvatierra, Spain

Church of Santa María
- Iglesia de Santa María (Spanish); Santa Maria eliza (Basque)
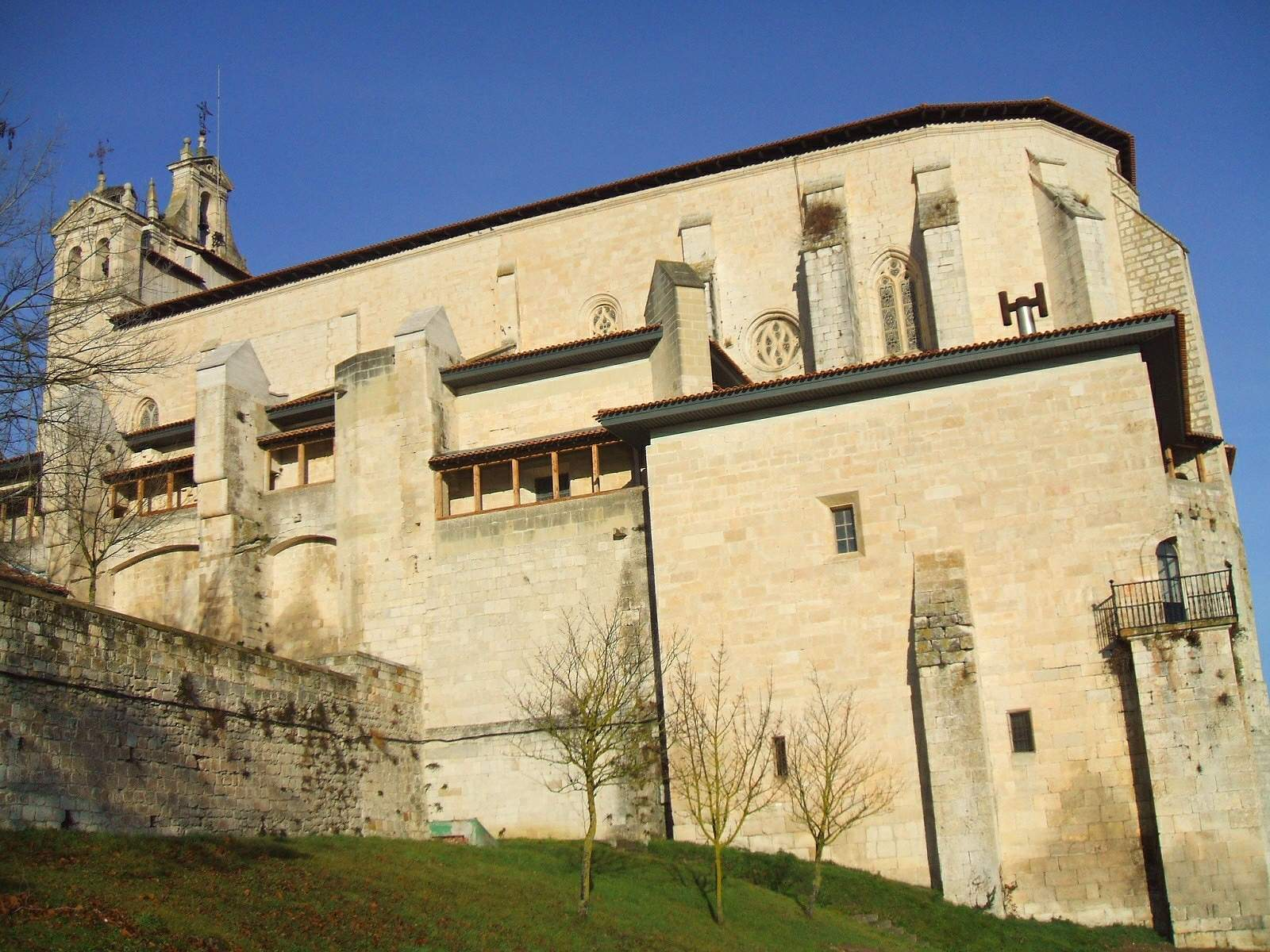
- View of the church
- 42°51′15″N 2°23′22″W
- Location: Agurain/Salvatierra, Álava, Basque Country
- Country: Spain
- Denomination: Catholic Church
- Tradition: Latin Church

History
- Status: Parish church

Administration
- Archdiocese: Archidiocese of Burgos
- Diocese: Diocese of Vitoria

Spanish Cultural Heritage
- Official name: Iglesia de Santa María
- Type: Non-movable
- Criteria: Monument
- Designated: 17 July 1984
- Reference no.: RI-51-0005109

The Church of Santa María (Spanish: Iglesia de Santa María, Basque: Santa Maria eliza) is a church located in Agurain/Salvatierra, Basque Country, Spain. It was declared Bien de Interés Cultural in 1984.

== See also ==
- Church of San Juan, Agurain/Salvatierra
