= Los Arquillos =

Structure in Vitoria-Gasteiz, Basque Country, Spain

- Arkupea (Basque)
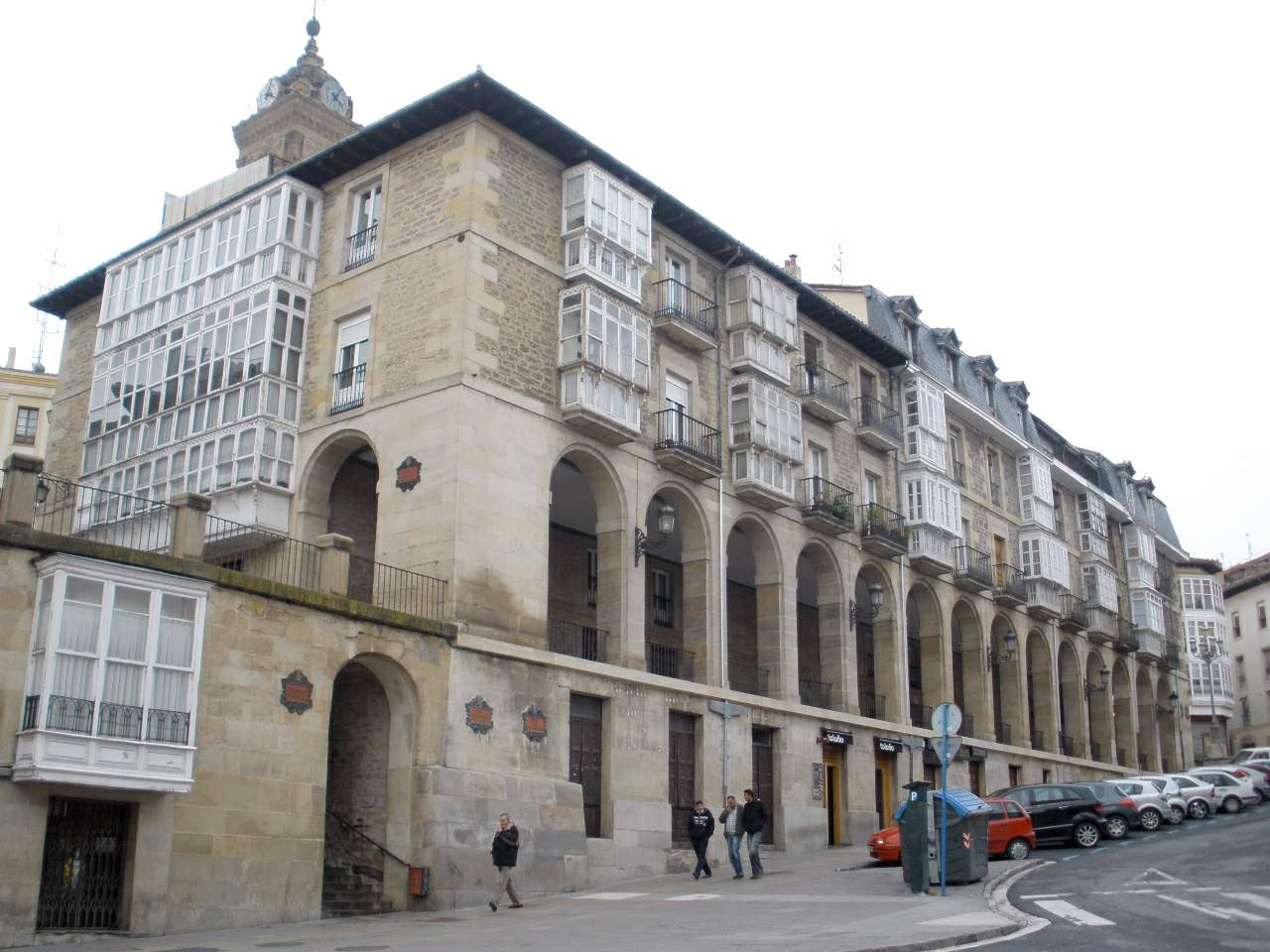
- View from the lower level
- Interactive map of the Los Arquillos area

General information
- Location: Vitoria-Gasteiz, Álava, Basque Country, Spain
- Coordinates: 42.846988°N 2.671755°W
- Construction started: 1787
- Completed: 1802

Spanish Cultural Heritage
- Official name: Los Arquillos
- Type: Non-movable
- Criteria: Monument
- Designated: 1984
- Reference no.: RI-51-0005113

Los Arquillos (Spanish for 'the small arches', Basque: Arkupea) is an 18th-century structure located in Vitoria-Gasteiz, Spain. It was architecturally designed to link the old part of the town situated on the higher ground with the new part of the town then under construction on lower ground.

It was declared Bien de Interés Cultural in 1984.
