= Church of San Miguel, Vitoria-Gasteiz =

Church in Vitoria-Gasteiz, Spain

Church of San Miguel
- Iglesia de San Miguel Arcángel (Spanish); San Migel Goiaingeruaren eliza (Basque)
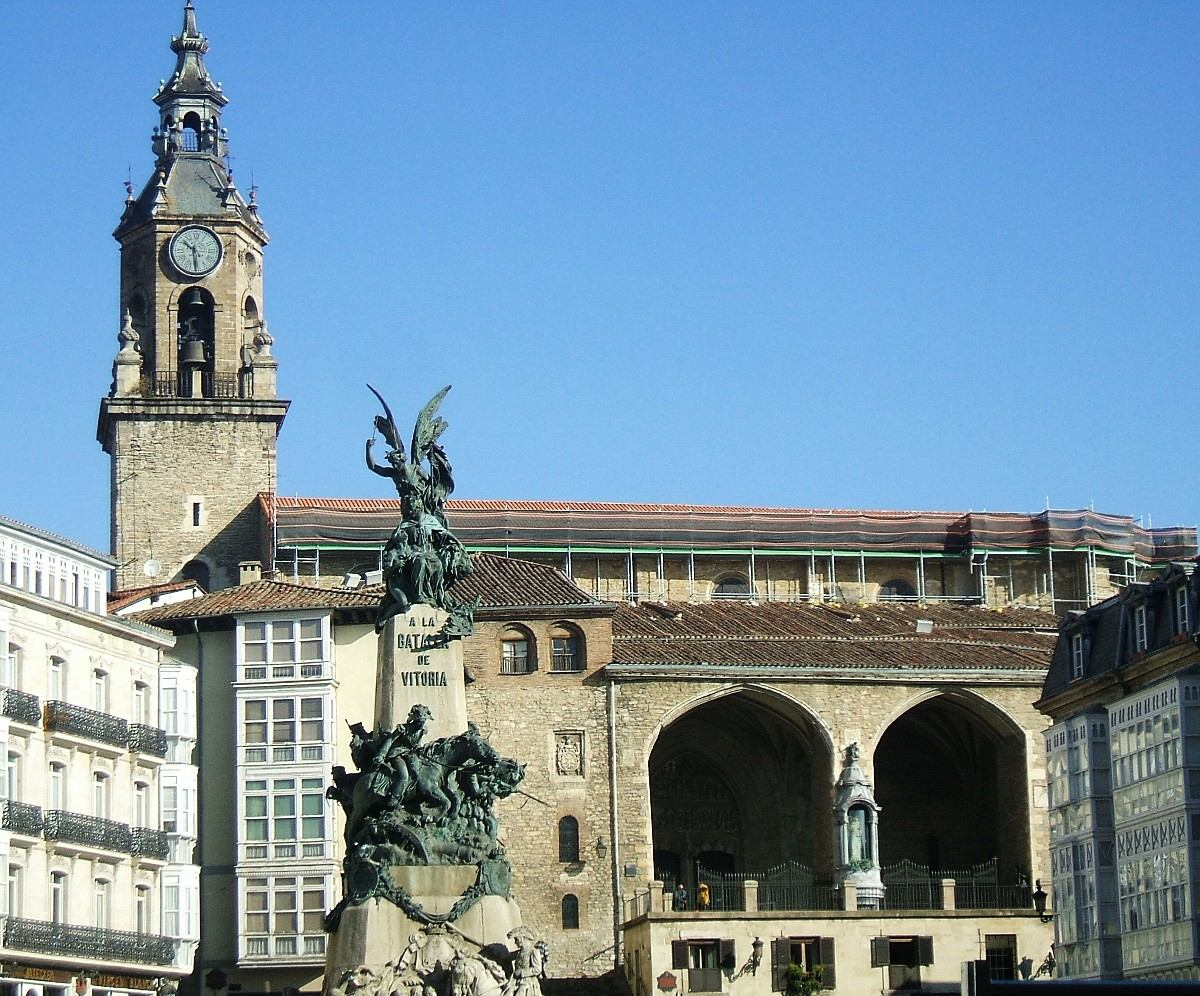
- View from the Plaza de la Virgen Blanca
- 42°50′51″N 2°40′22″W
- Location: Vitoria-Gasteiz, Álava, Basque Country
- Country: Spain
- Denomination: Catholic Church
- Tradition: Latin Church

History
- Status: Parish church

Architecture
- Style: Gothic

Administration
- Archdiocese: Archidiocese of Burgos
- Diocese: Diocese of Vitoria

Spanish Cultural Heritage
- Official name: Iglesia de San Miguel
- Type: Non-movable
- Criteria: Monument
- Designated: 1995
- Reference no.: RI-51-0005442

The Church of San Miguel (Spanish: Iglesia de San Miguel Arcángel, Basque: San Migel Goiaingeruaren eliza) is a church located in Vitoria-Gasteiz, Basque Country, Spain. It was declared Bien de Interés Cultural in 1995.

The retable of the church is a baroque altarpiece, it is one of the finest works by Gregorio Fernández and his workshop.
