= Basque Cultural Heritage =

Heritage designation in the Basque Country, Spain

Basque Cultural Heritage (Basque: Euskal Kultura Ondasuna, Spanish: Patrimonio Cultural Vasco) is a designation granted by the Basque Government to movable properties, immovable properties and intangible heritage of the Basque Country, Spain. The current law governing the designation was enacted in 2019, superseding the first one from 1990.

== History ==
The first law, enacted in 1990, distinguished three categories of cultural heritage:

- Monument (Basque: monumentua, Spanish: monumento): movable or immovable properties with individual cultural interest.
- Monument complex (Basque: monumentu-multzoa, Spanish: conjunto monumental): groups of movable or immovable properties forming a cultural unity.
- Cultural space (Basque: kulturagunea, Spanish: espacio cultural): places, activities, creations, beliefs, traditions or events of the past linked to relevant forms of the Basques' culture and lifestyle.

The law offered two degrees of protection: qualified (Spanish: calificado, Basque: zermugatua, kalifikatua, sailkatua) and listed (Spanish: inventariado, Basque: zerrendatutakoa, inbentariatua). While the Basque Government designated the sites, it was the governments of the Basque provinces that preserved and managed the sites.

In August 2018, the Basque Government put forward a bill to update its regulations about cultural heritage. It would increase the number of heritage categories from three to thirteen, as well as toughen penalties for violators. The law was enacted in 2019, with near-unanimous support in the Basque Parliament. It was the third regional law in Spain to contemplate the protection of intangible heritage, after the ones of Navarre and Andalusia. The enacted law distinguishes nineteen categories of cultural heritage, arranged in three broad groups:

- Immovable properties: monument (Basque: monumentua, Spanish: monumento), monument complex (Basque: monumentu-multzoa, Spanish: conjunto monumental), archaeologic or paleontologic area (Basque: eremu arkeologikoa edo paleontologikoa, Spanish: zona arqueológica o paleontológica), historic garden (Basque: lorategi historikoa, Spanish: jardín histórico), cultural itinerary (Basque: kultura-ibilbidea, Spanish: itinerario cultural) and cultural landscape (Basque: kultura-espazioa, Spanish: paisaje cultural).
- Movable properties: individual movable property (Basque: ondasun higigarri banakakoa, Spanish: bien mueble individual) and complex of movable properties (Basque: ondasun higigarrien multzoa, Spanish: conjunto de bienes muebles).
- Intangible heritage: cultural oral traditions and expressions, bertsolaritza, music, dance, traditional and commemorative performances, social traditions, cuisine, sport, festivities, traditions related to nature and the universe and artisanal and industrial techniques.

The 2019 law offers three degrees of protection: basic, medium and special. All sites with medium or special protection are included in the Register of Basque Cultural Heritage of the Basque Autonomous Community, created in 2022. The first practice to be designated as intangible heritage was bertsolaritza in 2024.
