= Barrundia =

Coordinates: 42.9167°N 2.49182°W

- Municipality
- Coat of arms

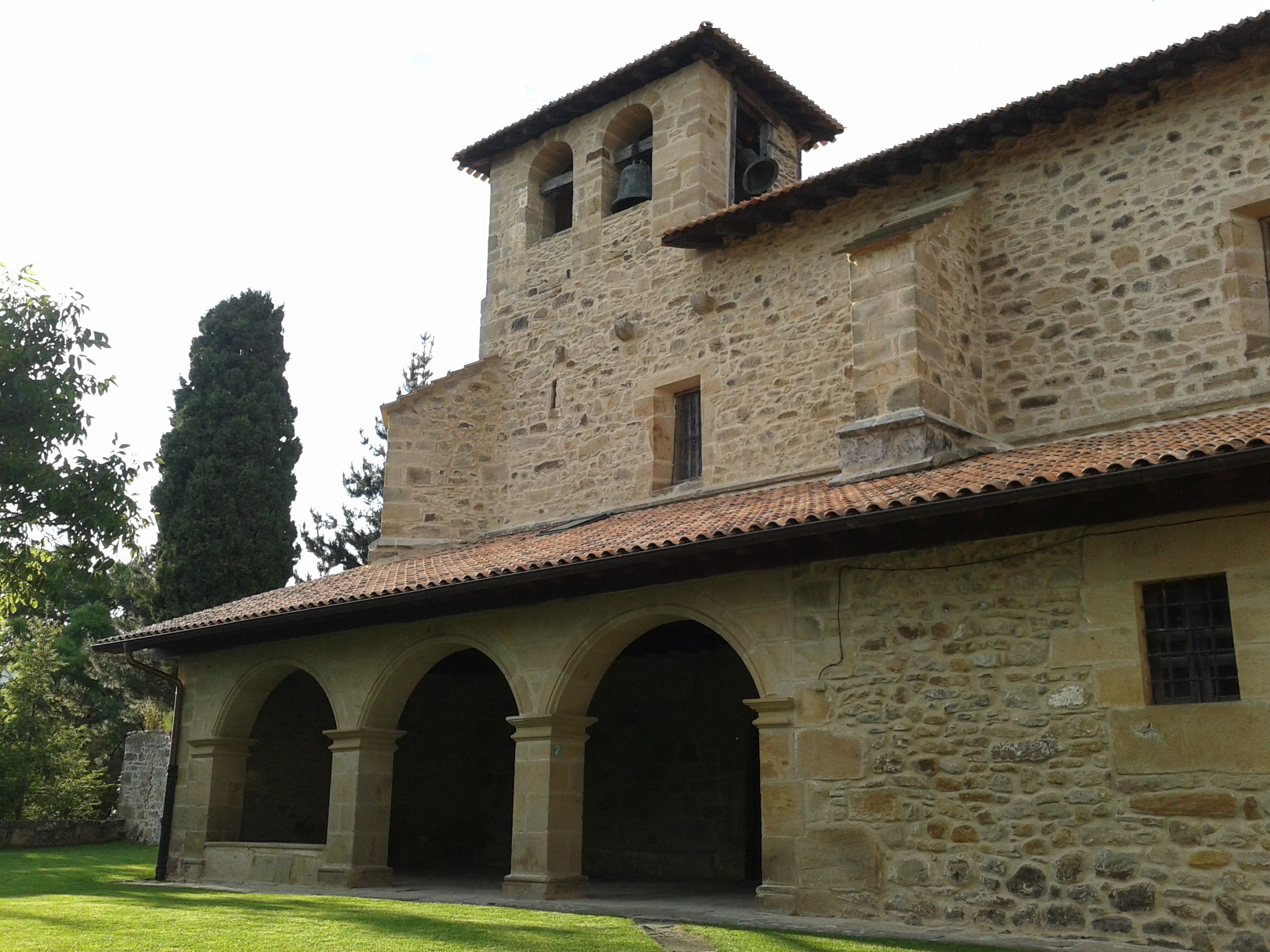
- Church in Elgea
- Country: Spain
- Autonomous community: Basque Country
- Province: Álava

Government
  - Type: Ayuntamiento
  - Mayor: Igor Medina Isasa (EH Bildu)

Area
  - Total: 97.43 km^{2} (37.62 sq mi)

Population (2025-01-01)
  - Total: 882
  - Density: 9.05/km^{2} (23.4/sq mi)
- Time zone: UTC+1 (CET)
  - Summer (DST): UTC+2 (CEST)
- Postal code: 01206, 01208
- Website: www.barrundia.eus

Barrundia is a valley and municipality located in the province of Álava, in the Basque Country, northern Spain. It includes the village of Guevara (Gebara). Ozaeta is the capital. A stream of the same name runs through the valley, pouring into the Ullíbarri-Gamboa reservoir.
