= Prudentius of Tarazona =

6th-century Spanish bishop and saint

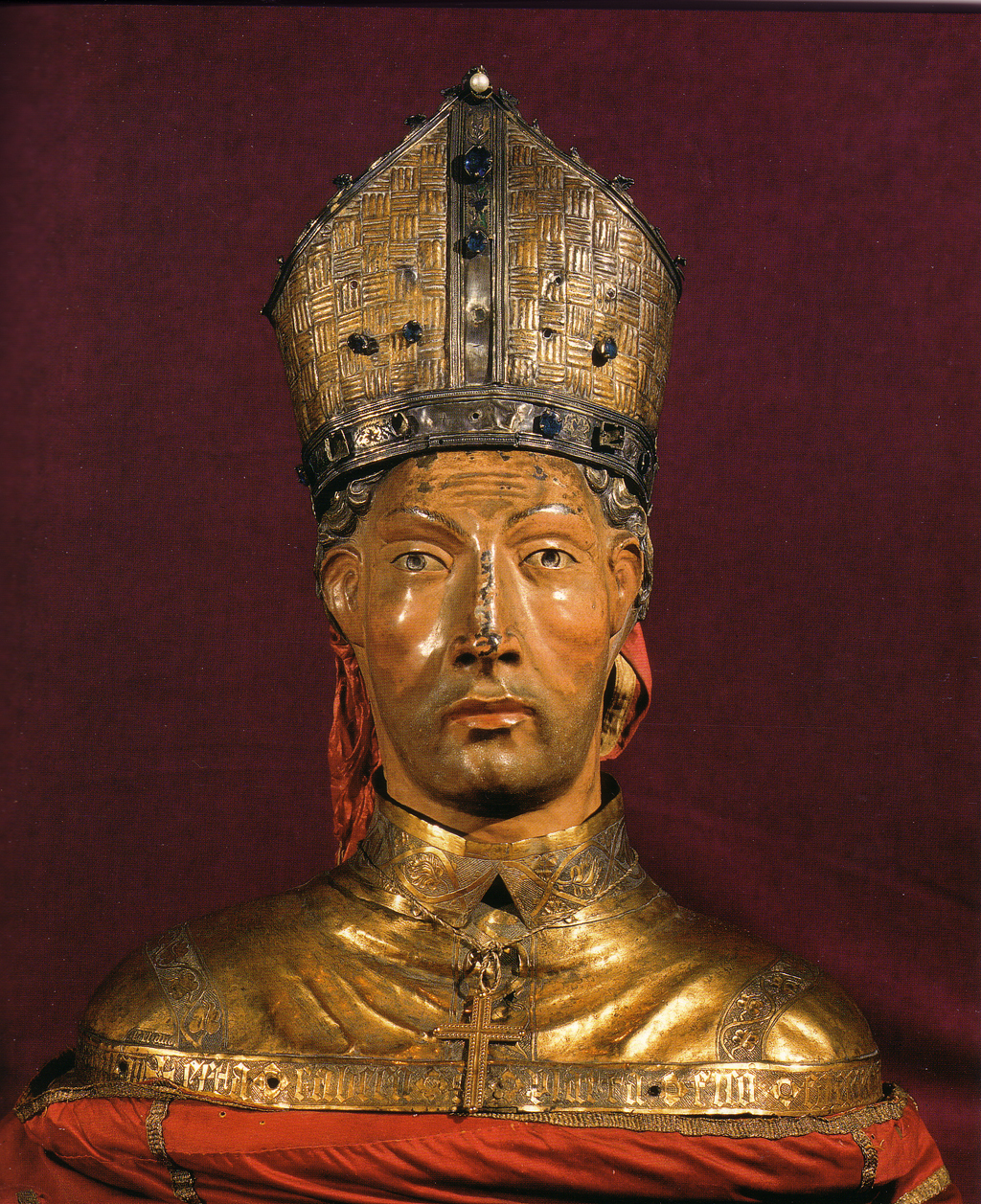
15th-century bust of St. Prudentius held at the Co-Cathedral of Logroño

Prudentius of Tarazona (Spanish: Prudencio de Tarazona or San Prudencio; Basque: [San] Prudentzio) was a 6th-century Basque anchorite and cleric who was bishop of Tarazona. He has been the patron saint of Nájera and Álava since the mid-17th century. His feast day is on 28 April.

== Life ==
He was born and raised in Armentia, a village in the municipality of Vitoria, Álava.

When he turned fifteen, he became a hermit near Soria under the tutelage of Saturio. He stayed there for around seven years and after that he moved to Calahorra, where there was a large diocesan headquarters. It was recorded that he converted many people in Tarazona where he had settled after leaving Soria. Years later he was admitted as a cleric in the diocese of Tarazona, and oversaw the maintenance of the temple from its construction, and he became an archdeacon. After the death of the bishop of Tarazona, Prudentius was chosen to replace him.

As he performed miraculous healings, he had become famous among the sick. Deciding to escape from fame, he left Tarazona and returned to Soria. At that time there were disagreements between the bishopric and the cleric of Burgo de Osma, and Prudentius was chosen to be the intermediary. After helping reconcile the two factions, he later succumbed to a mortal illness and died.

== Contributions ==
San Saturio hermitage (Soria) was built where Prudentius was a disciple of Saturio. Although there are many different documents referring to San Prudentius, it is thought that the breviary of Tarazona is the most credible one. It is not known exactly when he lived, inasmuch as there are many conflicting dates between the late 4th century and the late 6th century. If we take into account that Prudentius's master was born in 493 AD, he would have been born in approximately the mid-6th century.

== Death and grave ==
As he died in Burgo de Osma, outside his diocese, and as a result of his venerated status, the fate of his relics led to heated quarrels between the jurisdictions. Legend has it that the matter was solved by placing his dead body on the horse he had used when he was alive, and setting it free. The horse stopped in the region of Logroño and they buried him in a cave of the mountain called Laturce, near the modern town of Clavijo (La Rioja). At the site of his grave, a church called San Vicente de Mártir (Saint Vincent the martyr) was built. According to the friar Gaspar Coronel, its name was changed to the Monastery of Saint Prudence in 1025. The church at Mt Laturce and Nájera disputed continually over where to bury Saint Prudence's remains. Finally most of his remains were interred in the new monastery of Santa María la Real in Nájera in 1040, with his head and some smaller bones left at Mount Laturce.

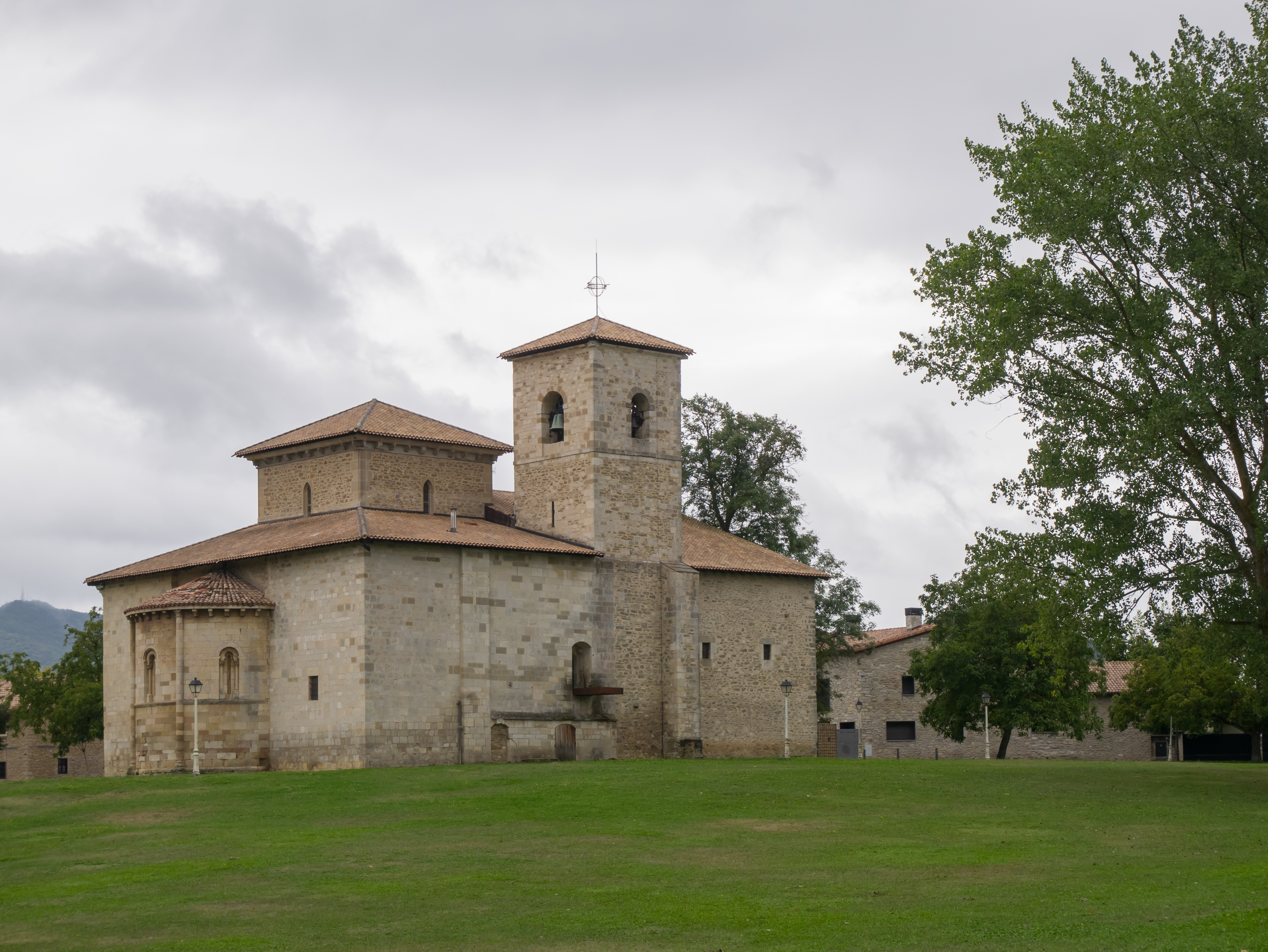
Church of Armentia

== Sanctification in Álava ==
St Prudence first appeared in San Millán de la Cogolla's monastery cartulary on 24 April 759, but began to be a symbol of public devotion in the middle of the 13th century.

On 18 November 1643 he was made the patron saint of the province of Álava, as ratified unanimously by the council on 4 May 1645. In 1688 local devotion led to the declaration of his feast day and the creation of a chapel in his name in his birthplace at Armentia.

== See also ==
- San Prudencio festival
