= Narvaja =

Village in Álava

Narbaiza
- Concejo
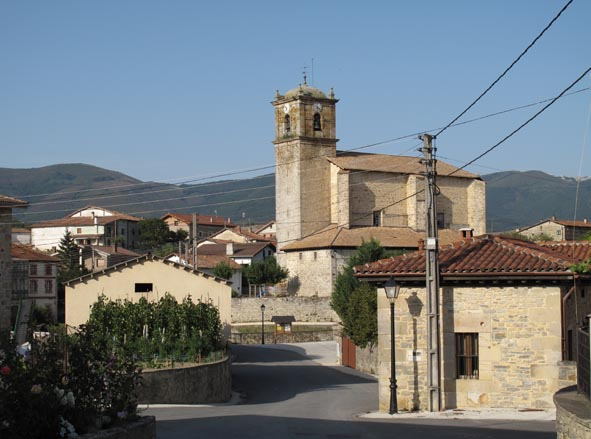
- View of the village

- Location within Álava Location within the Basque Country Location within Spain
- Coordinates: 42°54′29″N 2°24′49″W
- Country: Spain
- Autonomous community: Basque Country
- Province: Álava
- Comarca: Llanada Alavesa
- Municipality: San Millán/Donemiliaga

Area
  - Total: 20.73 km^{2} (8.00 sq mi)
- Elevation: 594 m (1,949 ft)

Population (2022)
  - Total: 112
  - Density: 5.40/km^{2} (14.0/sq mi)
- Postal code: 01208

Narvaja (officially in Basque: Narvaiza, according to Euskaltzaindia guidelines: Narbaxa) is a village and concejo located in the municipality of San Millán/Donemiliaga, in Álava province, Basque Country, Spain.
