= Jauregi =

Hamlet in Álava, Spain

- Concejo
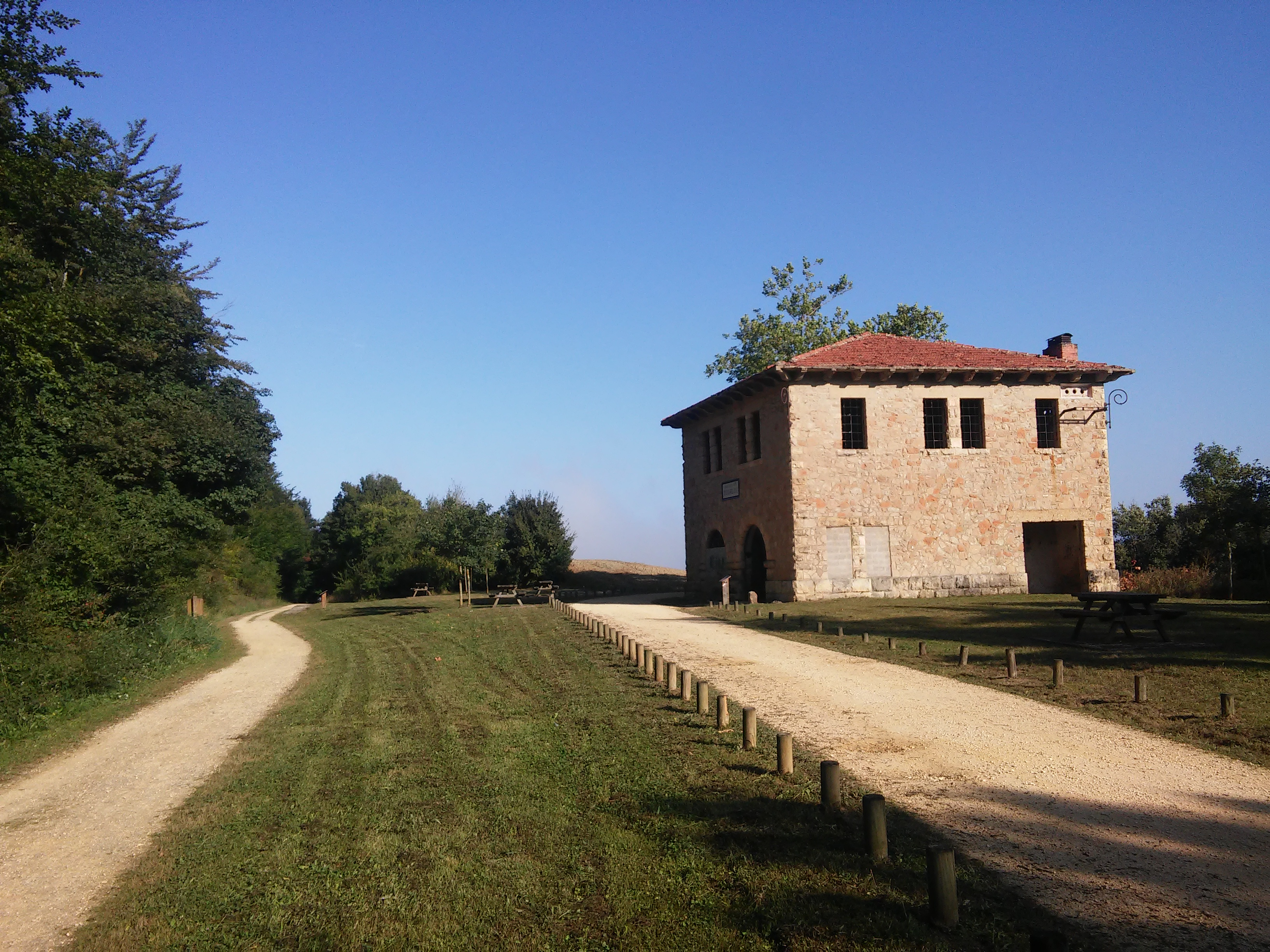
- The former railway station of the Vasco-Navarro railway

- Location within Álava Location within the Basque Country Location within Spain
- Coordinates: 42°48′37″N 2°27′45″W
- Country: Spain
- Autonomous community: Basque Country
- Province: Álava
- Comarca: Llanada Alavesa
- Municipality: Iruraiz-Gauna

Area
  - Total: 3.35 km^{2} (1.29 sq mi)
- Elevation: 650 m (2,130 ft)

Population (2022)
  - Total: 5
  - Density: 1.5/km^{2} (3.9/sq mi)
- Postal code: 01207

Jauregi (Spanish: Jáuregui) is a hamlet and concejo located in the municipality of Iruraiz-Gauna, in Álava province, Basque Country, Spain. As of 2020, it has a population of 5. It is adjacent to Ullíbarri-Jáuregui, in the municipality of San Millán/Donemiliaga.
