= Luzuriaga =

Luzuriaga may refer to:

== Botany ==
- Luzuriaga (plant), a genus of plants in the family Alstroemeriaceae

== Places ==
- Luzuriaga, Álava, Basque Country, Spain
- Luzuriaga, a district of Maipú Department, Mendoza, Argentina
  - Luzuriaga station
- Valencia, Negros Oriental, Philippines, previously named Luzuriaga

== People ==
- Katherine Luzuriaga, American physician and pediatric immunologist
- Lorenzo Luzuriaga (1889–1959), Spanish and Argentinian educationalist
- Toribio de Luzuriaga (1782–1842), Peruvian-Argentine soldier and the first Grand Marshal of Peru

== See also ==
- Luzárraga, a Basque surname
