= Galarreta =

Galarreta, also de Galarreta, is a Basque surname, connected with the village of Galarreta, Álava, Basque Country, Spain. It is prevalent in Peru and Spain.

Notable people with this surname include:

- Alberto Ruiz de Galarreta Mocoroa (1922–2019), Spanish historian
- Alfonso de Galarreta (born 1957), Spanish-Argentinian bishop
- Iñigo Ruiz de Galarreta (born 1993), Spanish footballer
- Luis Galarreta (born 1973), Peruvian politician
