= Azilu =

Hamlet in Álava, Spain

- Concejo
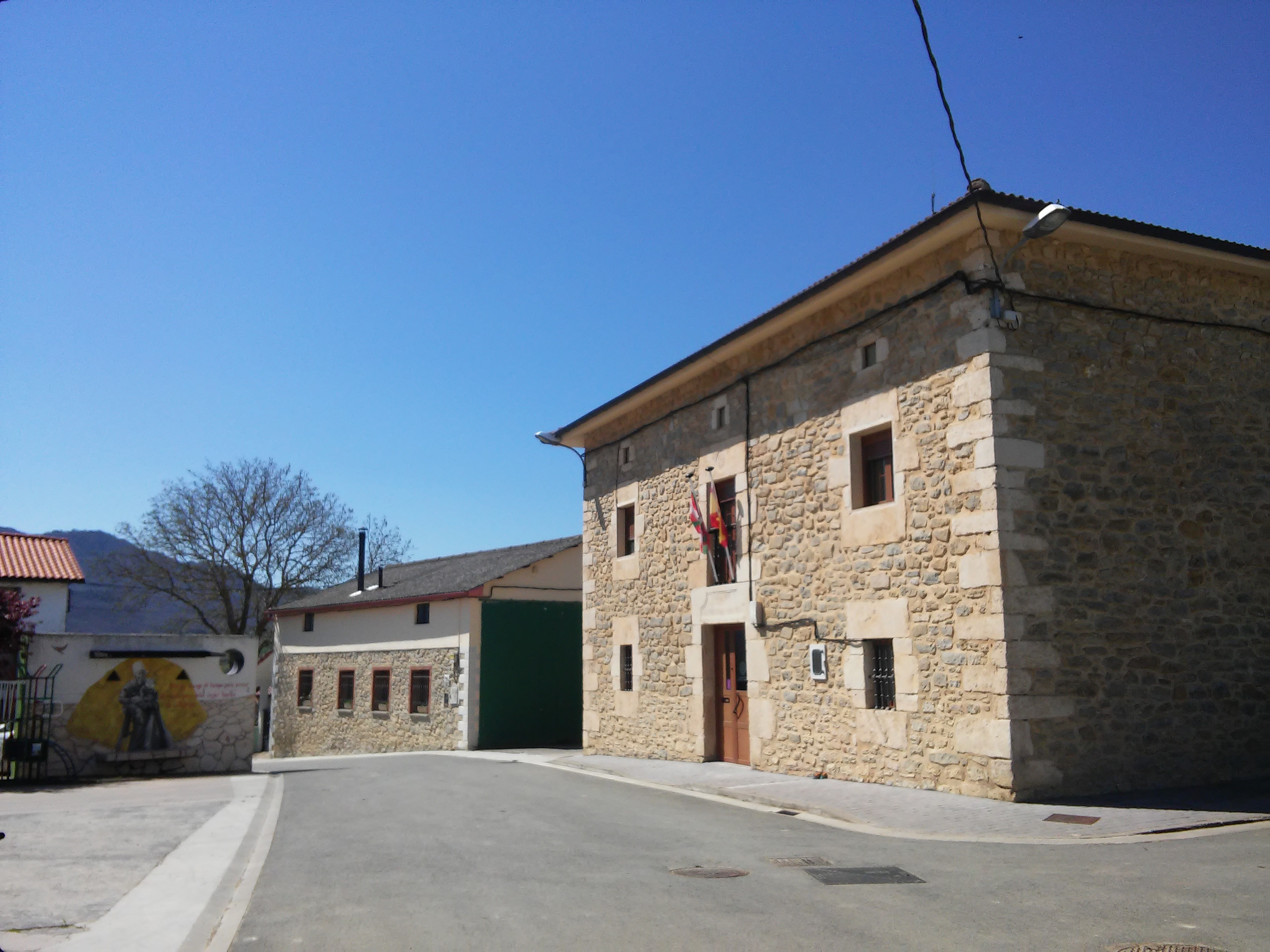

- Location within Álava Location within the Basque Country Location within Spain
- Coordinates: 42°49′52″N 2°28′34″W
- Country: Spain
- Autonomous community: Basque Country
- Province: Álava
- Comarca: Llanada Alavesa
- Municipality: Iruraiz-Gauna

Area
  - Total: 1.27 km^{2} (0.49 sq mi)
- Elevation: 638 m (2,093 ft)

Population (2023)
  - Total: 29
  - Density: 23/km^{2} (59/sq mi)
- Postal code: 01193

Azilu (Spanish: Acilu) is a hamlet and concejo in the municipality of Iruraiz-Gauna, in Álava province, Basque Country, Spain. It is the capital of the municipality.
