= Gazeta =

Gazeta may refer to:

== Newspapers ==
=== Albanian language ===
- Gazeta 55, daily newspaper
- Gazeta Express, a Kosovo newspaper published in Pristina
- Gazeta Rilindja Demokratike, daily newspaper
- Gazeta Shqip, daily newspaper
- Gazeta Sot, a daily newspaper published in Albania

=== Polish language ===
- Gazeta Olsztyńska, a Polish-language newspaper, published 1886–1939 in Prussia
- Gazeta Polska, a Polish weekly
- Gazeta Polska (1929–1939), a newspaper of interwar Poland, published from 1929 to 1939 in Warsaw
- Gazeta Warszawska, the first newspaper published regularly in Warsaw
- Gazeta Wyborcza, a Polish newspaper

=== Russian language ===
- Gazeta.Ru, a Russian newspaper
- Literaturnaya Gazeta, a weekly cultural and political newspaper published in Russia
- Nezavisimaya Gazeta, a Russian-language daily newspaper
- Novaya Gazeta, a Russian newspaper
- Roman-Gazeta, a literary monthly in the Soviet Union
- Rossiyskaya Gazeta, a Russian government daily newspaper

=== Other languages ===
- Gazeta (newspaper), a Serbian newspaper
- Gazeta de Caracas, the first newspaper printed in Venezuela
- Gaceta de Puerto Rico, the first newspaper published on the island of Puerto Rico
- Gazeta de Transilvania, the first Romanian-language newspaper to be published in Transylvania
- Gazeta Sporturilor, a daily newspaper in Romania
- Gazeta.ua, a Ukrainian newspaper

== Television stations ==
- TV Gazeta, a television station in São Paulo, Brazil
- TV Gazeta de Alagoas, a television station in Maceió, Alagoas, Brazil
- Rede Gazeta, a television station in Vitória, Espírito Santo, Brazil
- TV Gazeta (Acre), a television station in Rio Branco, Acre, Brazil

== Other uses ==
- Gazeta, Álava, a hamlet in the Basque Country, Spain
- Ionian gazeta, a currency formerly used in the Ionian Islands

== See also ==
- Gazette
