= Erentxun =

Hamlet in Álava, Spain

- Concejo
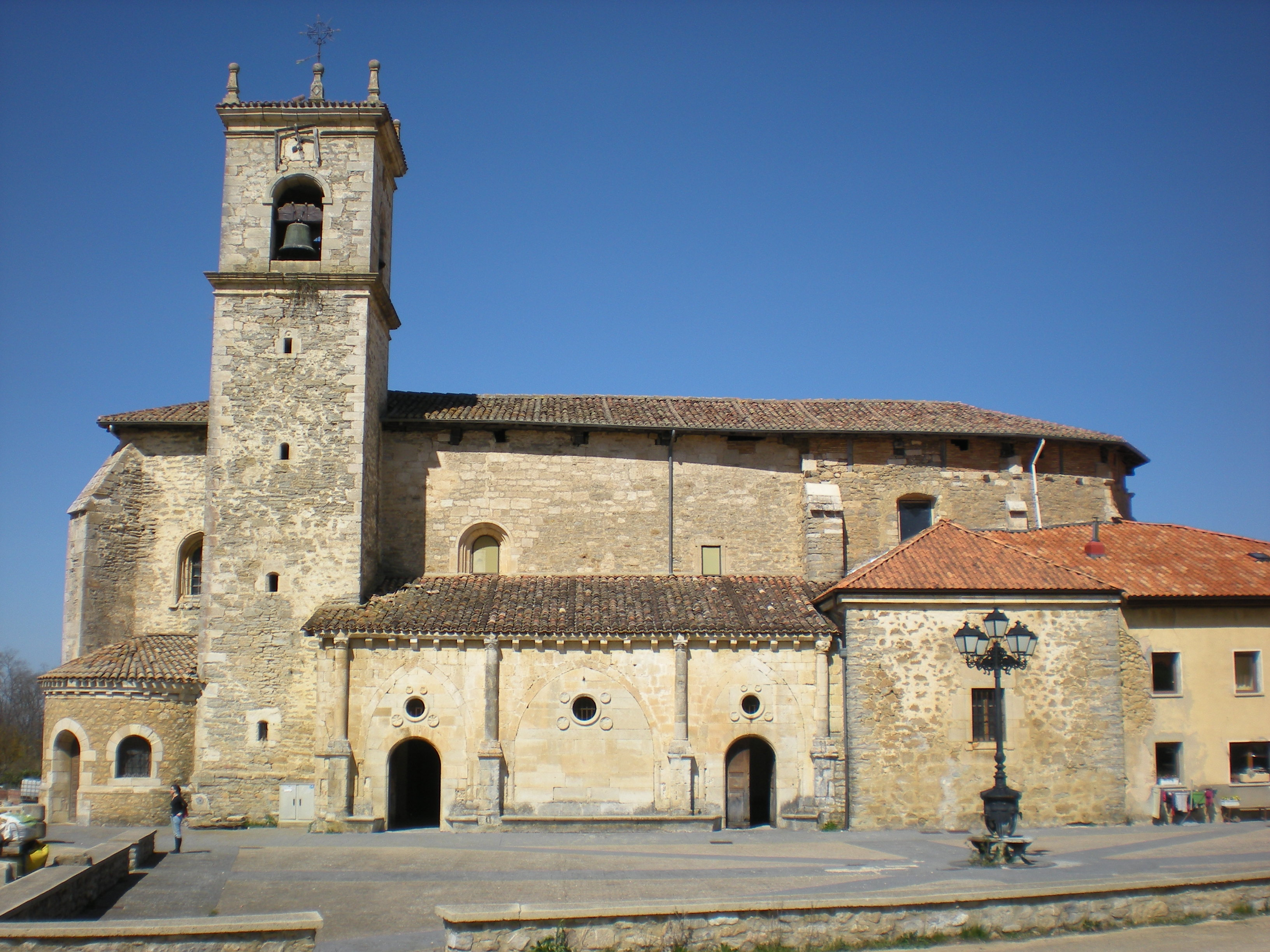
- The church of Erentxun

- Location within Álava Location within the Basque Country Location within Spain
- Coordinates: 42°48′55″N 2°31′19″W
- Country: Spain
- Autonomous community: Basque Country
- Province: Álava
- Comarca: Llanada Alavesa
- Municipality: Iruraiz-Gauna

Area
  - Total: 7.66 km^{2} (2.96 sq mi)
- Elevation: 615 m (2,018 ft)

Population (2023)
  - Total: 85
  - Density: 11/km^{2} (29/sq mi)
- Postal code: 01193

Erentxun (Spanish: Erenchun) is a hamlet and concejo in the municipality of Iruraiz-Gauna, in Álava province, Basque Country, Spain. Its parish church, dedicated to Saint Andrew, dates from the 13th century.
