= Langarika =

Hamlet in Álava, Spain

- Concejo
- Location within Álava Location within the Basque Country Location within Spain
- Coordinates: 42°50′07″N 2°25′47″W
- Country: Spain
- Autonomous community: Basque Country
- Province: Álava
- Comarca: Llanada Alavesa
- Municipality: Iruraiz-Gauna

Area
  - Total: 4.16 km^{2} (1.61 sq mi)
- Elevation: 611 m (2,005 ft)

Population (2023)
  - Total: 36
  - Density: 8.7/km^{2} (22/sq mi)
- Postal code: 01206

Langarika (Spanish: Langarica) is a hamlet and concejo in the municipality of Iruraiz-Gauna, in Álava province, Basque Country, Spain.
