= Alaiza =

Hamlet in Álava, Spain

Alaitza
- Concejo
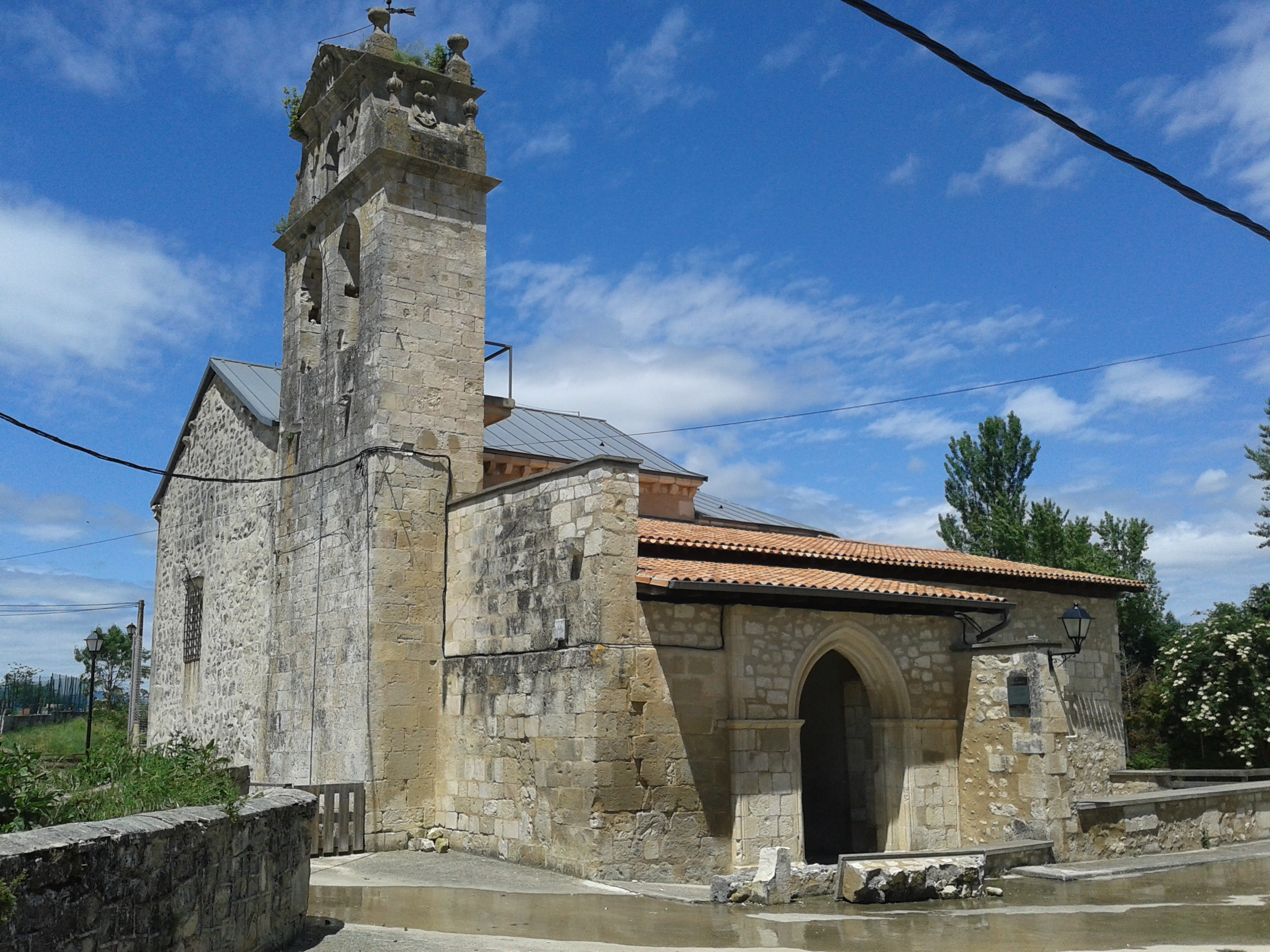

- Location within Álava Location within the Basque Country Location within Spain
- Coordinates: 42°49′26″N 2°24′53″W
- Country: Spain
- Autonomous community: Basque Country
- Province: Álava
- Comarca: Llanada Alavesa
- Municipality: Iruraiz-Gauna

Area
  - Total: 3.76 km^{2} (1.45 sq mi)
- Elevation: 650 m (2,130 ft)

Population (2023)
  - Total: 65
  - Density: 17/km^{2} (45/sq mi)
- Postal code: 01207

Alaitza (Spanish: Alaiza) is a hamlet and concejo in the municipality of Iruraiz-Gauna, in Álava province, Basque Country, Spain.
