= Hijona =

Hamlet in Álava

Hijona/Ixona
- Concejo
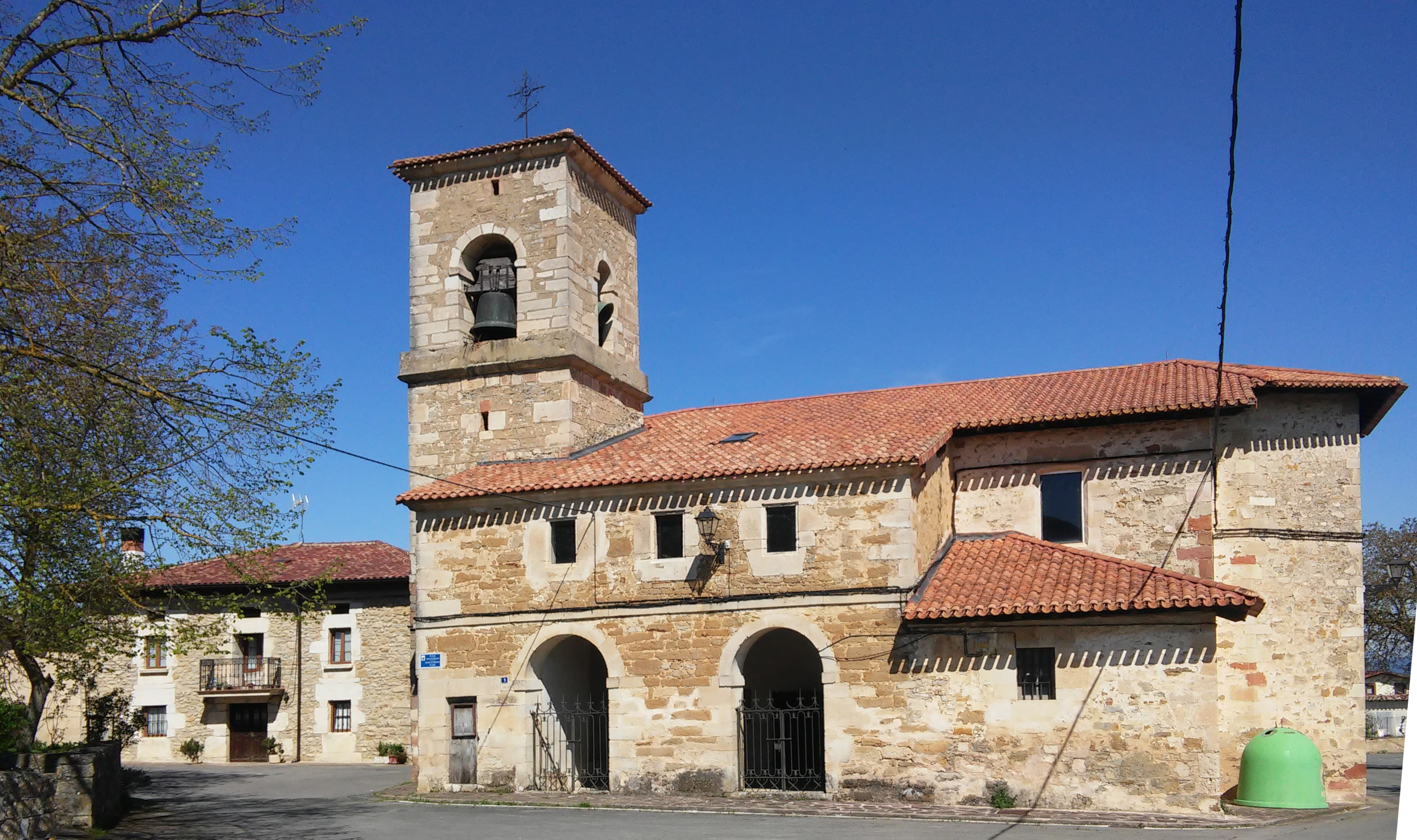
- Parish church

- Coat of arms

- Location within Álava Location within the Basque Country Location within Spain
- Coordinates: 42°48′56″N 2°32′49″W
- Country: Spain
- Autonomous community: Basque Country
- Province: Álava
- Comarca: Llanada Alavesa
- Municipality: Elburgo/Burgelu

Area
  - Total: 4.79 km^{2} (1.85 sq mi)
- Elevation: 615 m (2,018 ft)

Population (2022)
  - Total: 51
  - Density: 11/km^{2} (28/sq mi)
- Postal code: 01193

Hijona (Spanish pronunciation: [iˈxona]) or Ixona (Basque pronunciation: [iʃona]) is a hamlet and concejo located in the municipality of Elburgo/Burgelu, in Álava province, Basque Country, Spain.
