= Luzuriaga, Álava =

Hamlet in Álava, Spain

Luzuriaga
- Concejo
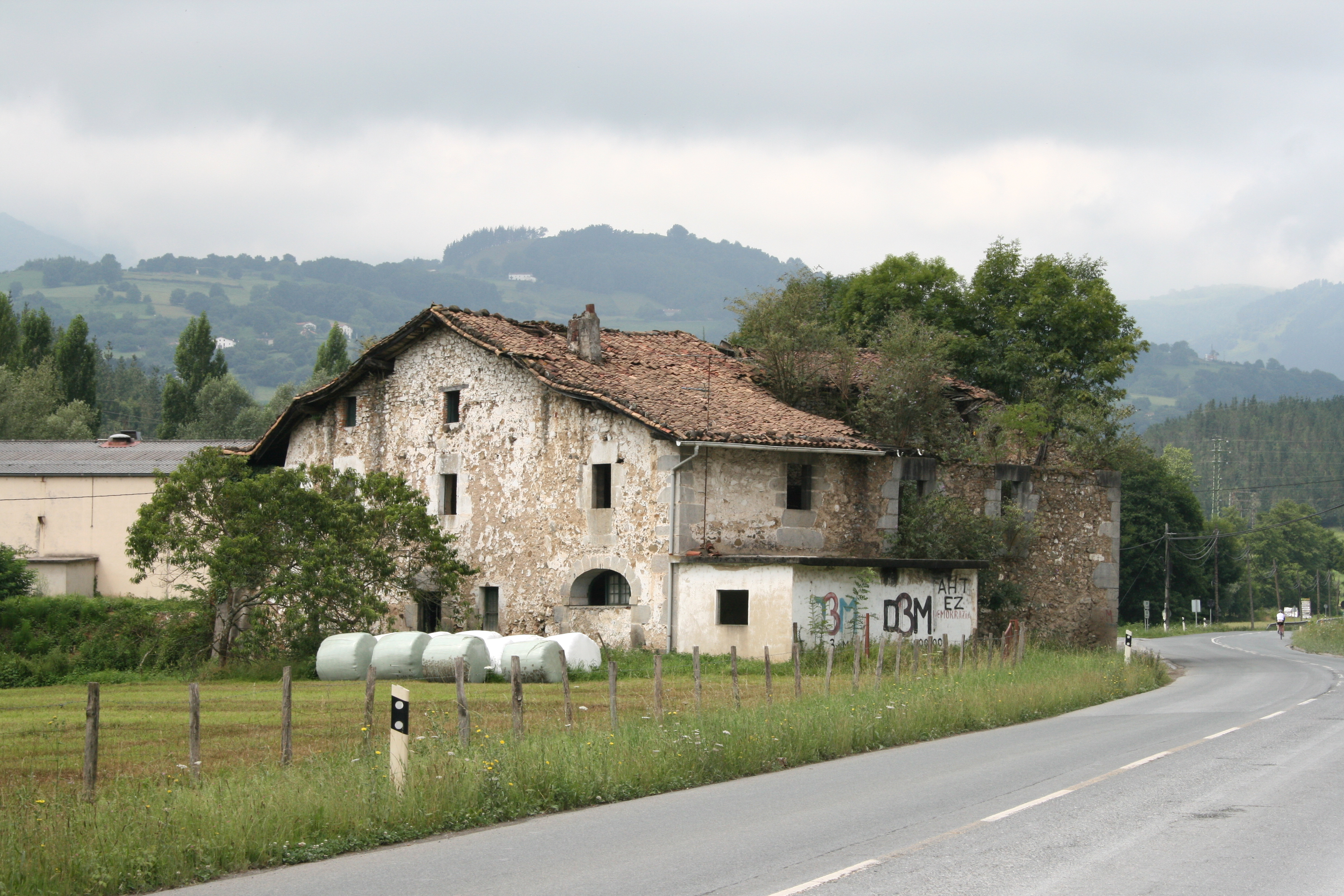
- A house in Luzuriaga

- Location within Álava Location within the Basque Country Location within Spain
- Coordinates: 42°53′08″N 2°23′36″W
- Country: Spain
- Autonomous community: Basque Country
- Province: Álava
- Comarca: Llanada Alavesa
- Municipality: San Millán/Donemiliaga

Area
  - Total: 3.37 km^{2} (1.30 sq mi)
- Elevation: 601 m (1,972 ft)

Population (2023)
  - Total: 31
  - Density: 9.2/km^{2} (24/sq mi)
- Postal code: 01208

Luzuriaga is a hamlet and concejo in the municipality of San Millán/Donemiliaga, in Álava province, Basque Country, Spain.
