= Munain =

Hamlet in Álava, Spain

- Concejo
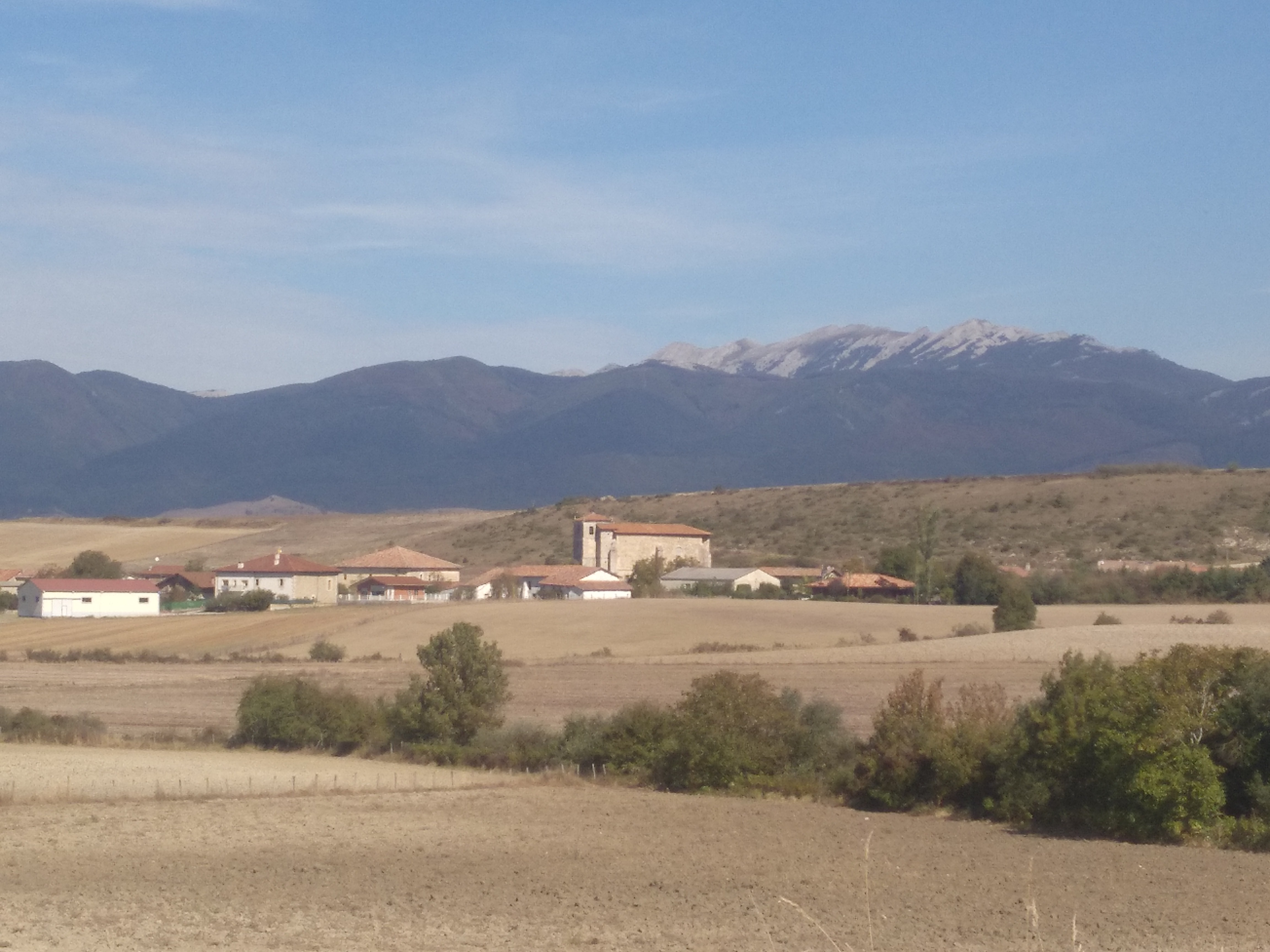
- View of Munain

- Location within Álava Location within the Basque Country Location within Spain
- Coordinates: 42°50′50″N 2°21′25″W
- Country: Spain
- Autonomous community: Basque Country
- Province: Álava
- Comarca: Llanada Alavesa
- Municipality: San Millán/Donemiliaga

Area
  - Total: 6.61 km^{2} (2.55 sq mi)
- Elevation: 618 m (2,028 ft)

Population (2023)
  - Total: 32
  - Density: 4.8/km^{2} (13/sq mi)
- Postal code: 01207

Munain is a hamlet and concejo in the municipality of San Millán/Donemiliaga, in Álava province, Basque Country, Spain. The Basque language was probably spoken in Munain until the late 18th century, but the main language now is Spanish.

== Landmarks ==
The church was built in the 16th century by Pedro de Ibarra and Juan de Arteaga. The bell tower has a square floor plan and is four stories tall. The altarpiece, dating from the early 17th century, was built by Manuel de Zozaya and José de Angulo. It is flanked by sculptures of Saint Peter and Saint Paul. Within the church there's a chapel built for the Vicuña family in the late 16th century.

== Oak forest ==
Between Munain and neighboring Okariz lies a 285 ha (700 acres) oak forest. The forest is notable for the size and age of its trees: about 600 of them are more than 500 years old, while a few trees have survived for 1500 years. The sources of the Zadorra river are located nearby.
