= Gazeo =

Hamlet in Álava, Spain

- Concejo
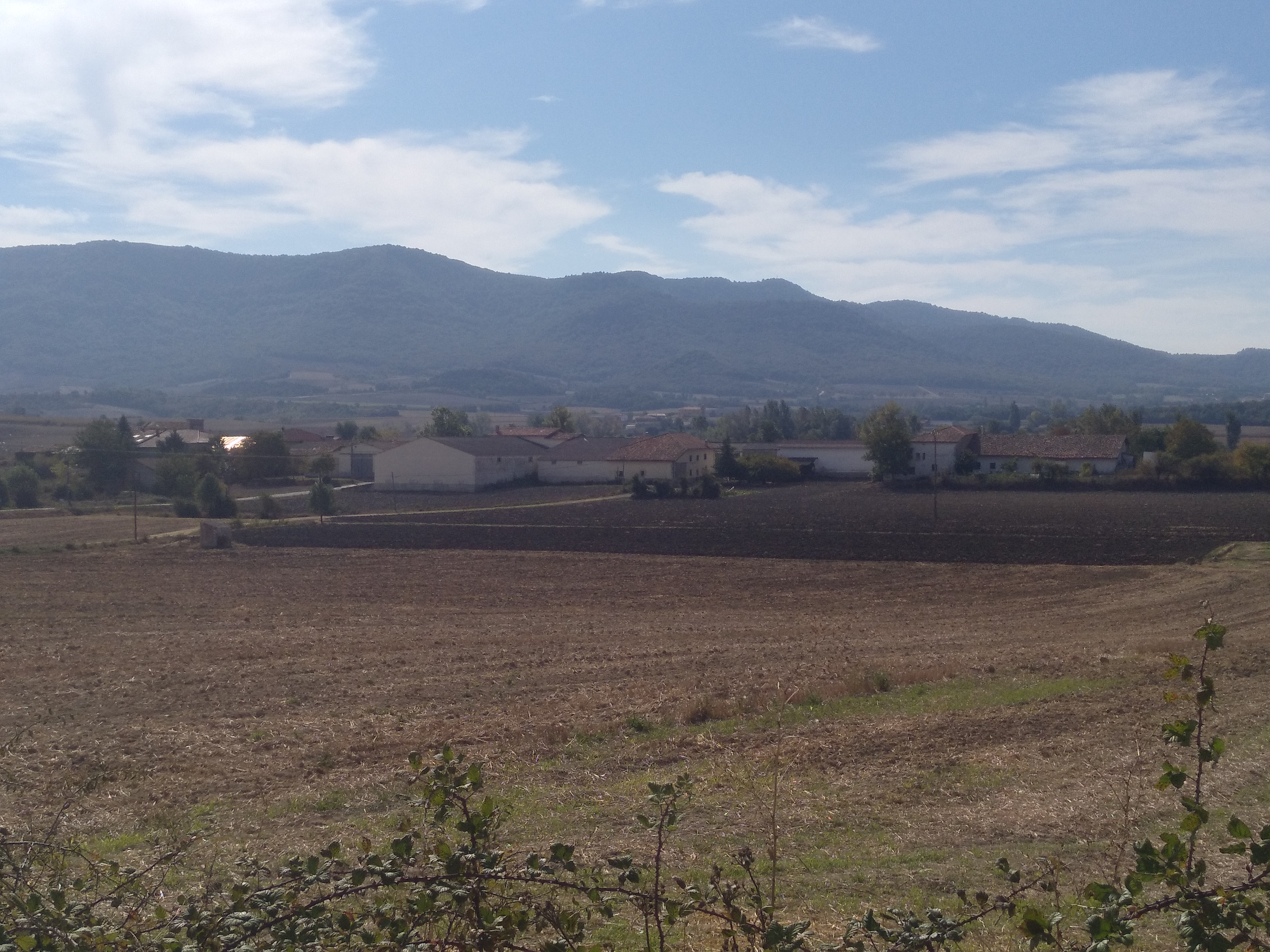
- View of Gazeo

- Location within Álava Location within the Basque Country Location within Spain
- Coordinates: 42°50′56″N 2°25′51″W
- Country: Spain
- Autonomous community: Basque Country
- Province: Álava
- Comarca: Llanada Alavesa
- Municipality: Iruraiz-Gauna

Area
  - Total: 2.44 km^{2} (0.94 sq mi)
- Elevation: 581 m (1,906 ft)

Population (2023)
  - Total: 51
  - Density: 21/km^{2} (54/sq mi)
- Postal code: 01206

Gazeo (Spanish: Gaceo) is a hamlet and concejo in the municipality of Iruraiz-Gauna, in Álava province, Basque Country, Spain.
