= Arbulu =

Hamlet in Álava, Spain

- Concejo
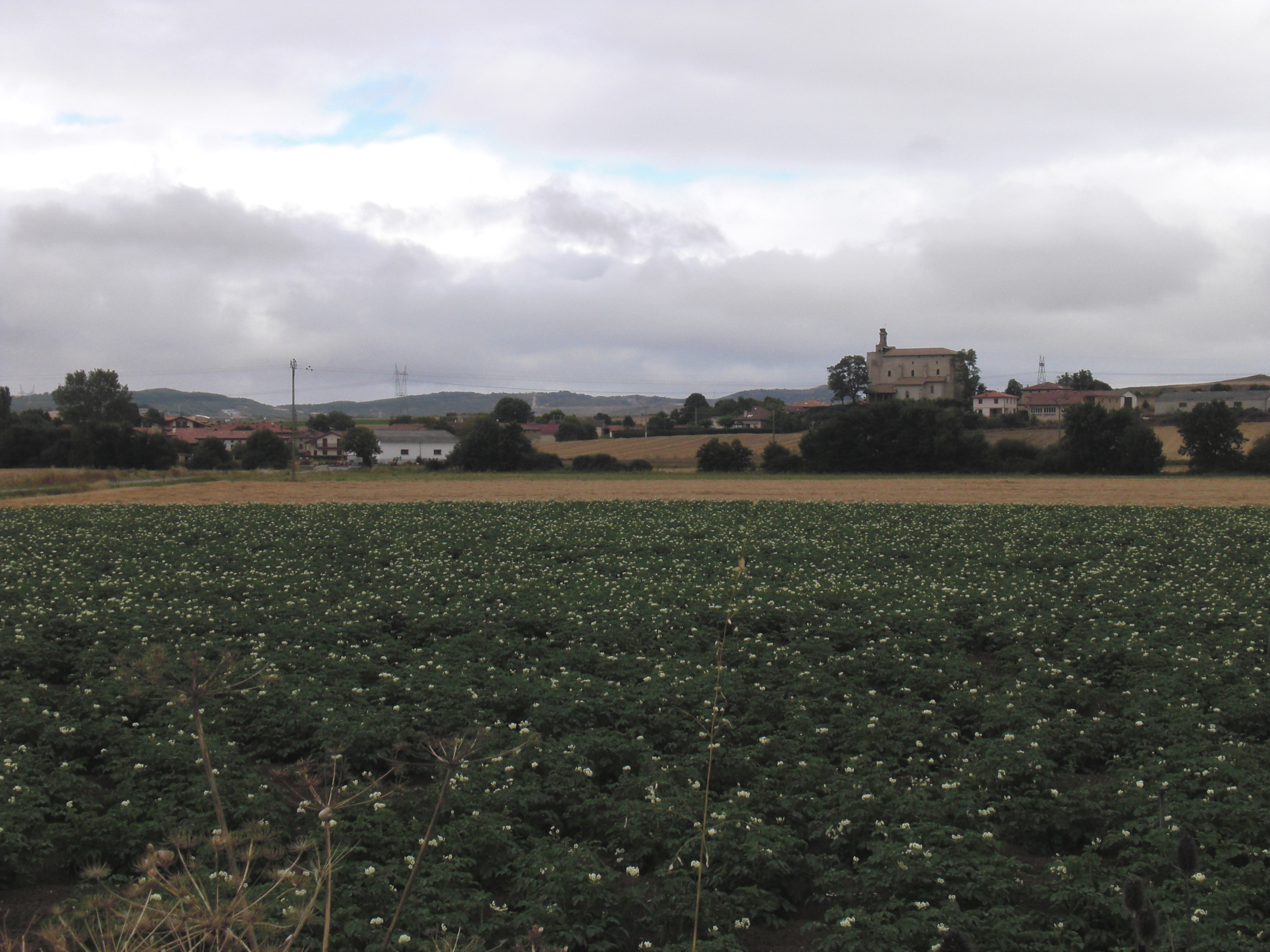
- View of Arbulu

- Coat of arms

- Location within Álava Location within the Basque Country Location within Spain
- Coordinates: 42°52′28″N 2°34′01″W
- Country: Spain
- Autonomous community: Basque Country
- Province: Álava
- Comarca: Llanada Alavesa
- Municipality: Elburgo/Burgelu

Area
  - Total: 2.84 km^{2} (1.10 sq mi)
- Elevation: 543 m (1,781 ft)

Population (2023)
  - Total: 94
  - Density: 33/km^{2} (86/sq mi)
- Postal code: 01192

Arbulu (Spanish: Arbulo) is a hamlet and concejo in the municipality of Elburgo/Burgelu, in Álava province, Basque Country, Spain.
