= Adana (disambiguation) =

Adana is a city in southern Turkey.

Adana may also refer to:

== Places ==
- Adana, Álava, a hamlet in the Basque Country, Spain
- Adana Province, a province in Turkey
- Adana Eyalet, one of the eyalet of the Ottoman Empire
- Adana Vilayet, one of the vilayet of the Ottoman Empire

== Other ==
- Adana (dance), a folk dance in Republic of Macedonia
- Adana (raga), a rāga in classical music
- Adana kebabı, a long, charcoal grilled, minced meat
- Adana Printing Machines, makers of small printing presses, England
