= Ilarduia =

Hamlet in Álava, Spain

- Concejo
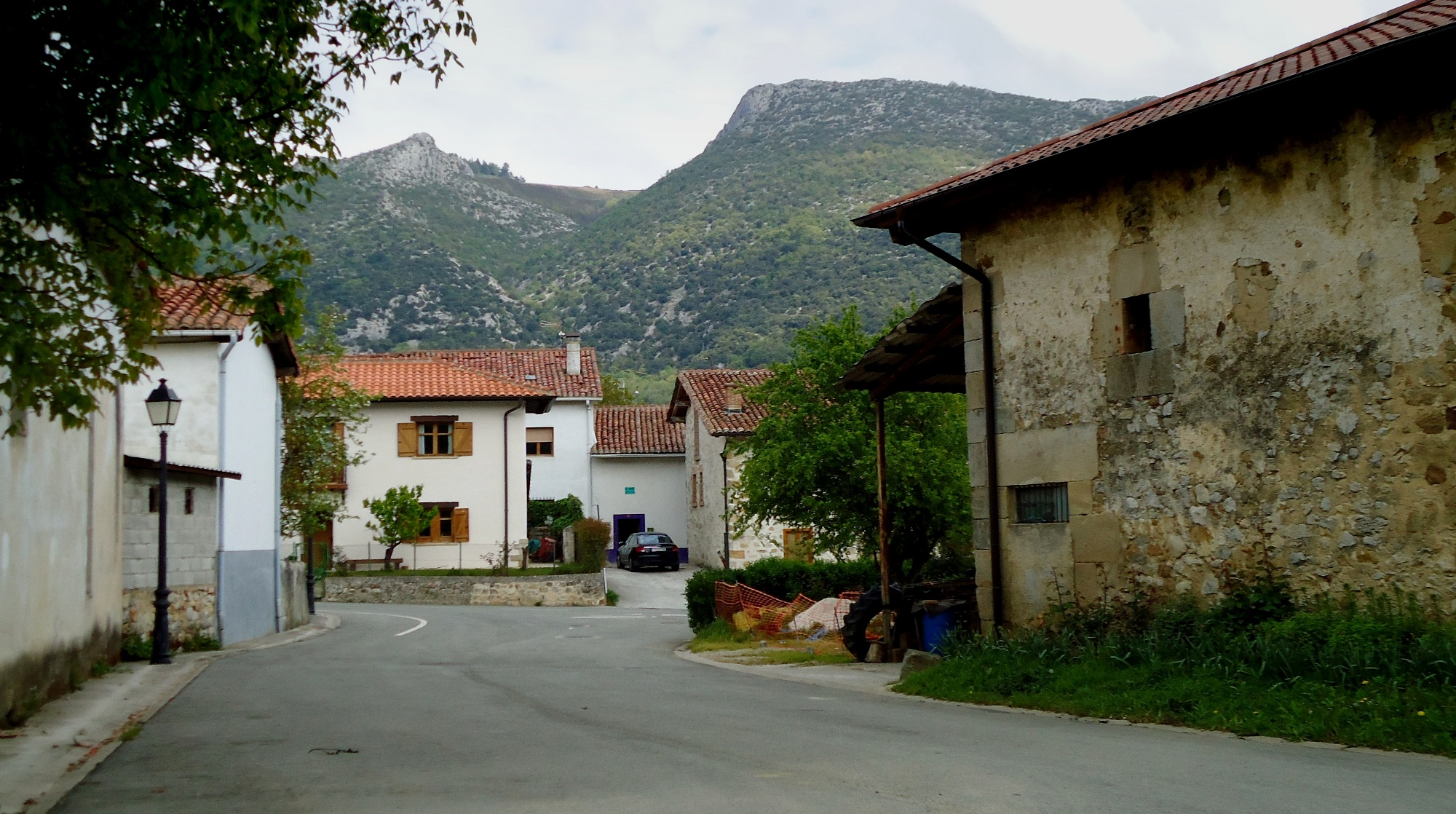
- View of Ilarduia

- Location within Álava Location within the Basque Country Location within Spain
- Coordinates: 42°52′22″N 2°17′07″W
- Country: Spain
- Autonomous community: Basque Country
- Province: Álava
- Comarca: Llanada Alavesa
- Municipality: Asparrena

Area
  - Total: 4.77 km^{2} (1.84 sq mi)
- Elevation: 574 m (1,883 ft)

Population (2023)
  - Total: 60
  - Density: 13/km^{2} (33/sq mi)
- Postal code: 01260

Ilarduia (Spanish: Ilárduya) is a hamlet and concejo in the municipality of Asparrena, Álava province, Basque Country, Spain.

== History ==
There are signs of human habitation in the area dating from the 4th and 3rd centuries BCE at the Ameztutxo site. There is evidence of Roman influence in tombstones found at the chapel of Artzanegi. The Ab Asturica Burdigalam Roman road passed through the area, a natural pass between Álava and Navarre, with the Altzania Range to the north and Urbasa to the south.

The village lacks a definite urban structure, although the main road traverses the hamlet from east to west. A house dating from the 17th century is one of the most notable civil buildings in Ilarduia. The parish church, dedicated to Saint Michael, was built in the 18th century as a replacement of the previous one.

== Culture ==
Ilarduia and the neighboring hamlets of Egino and Andoin celebrate a joint rural carnival. The celebration of carnivals was banned after the civil war, although the carnival hadn't been celebrated in Ilarduia since the late 1920s. A cultural association initiated an effort to revive the carnival in 2005, with the carnival being held for the first time in decades in 2007. The testimonies of the village elders were used to recreate the traditional carnivals.
