= Adana, Álava =

Hamlet in Álava, Spain

Adana
- Concejo
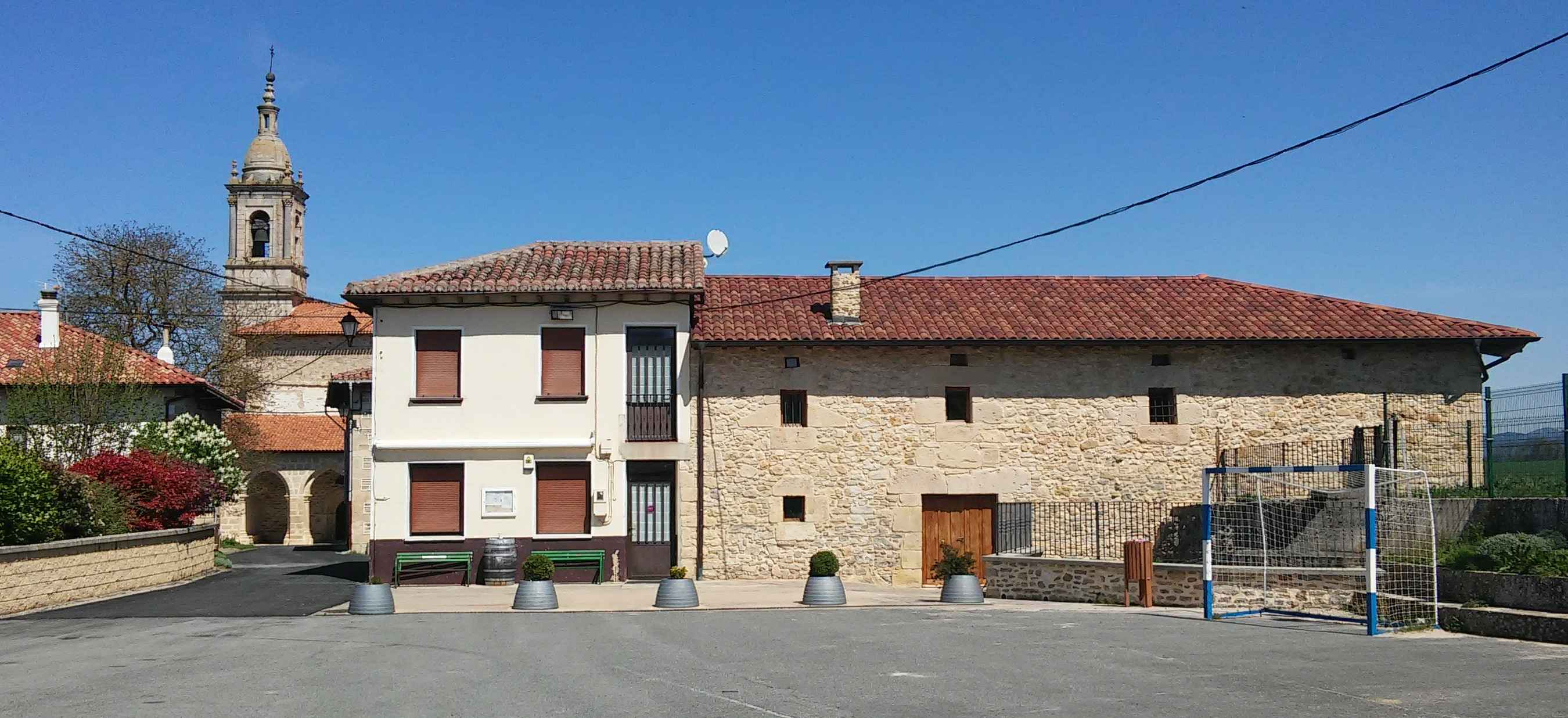

- Location within Álava Location within the Basque Country Location within Spain
- Coordinates: 42°49′21″N 2°28′29″W
- Country: Spain
- Autonomous community: Basque Country
- Province: Álava
- Comarca: Llanada Alavesa
- Municipality: San Millán/Donemiliaga

Area
  - Total: 5.15 km^{2} (1.99 sq mi)
- Elevation: 618 m (2,028 ft)

Population (2023)
  - Total: 59
  - Density: 11/km^{2} (30/sq mi)
- Postal code: 01207

Adana is a hamlet and concejo in the municipality of San Millán/Donemiliaga, in Álava province, Basque Country, Spain. It is located on the banks of the Santa Isabel stream.
