= Ezkerekotxa =

Hamlet in Álava, Spain

- Concejo
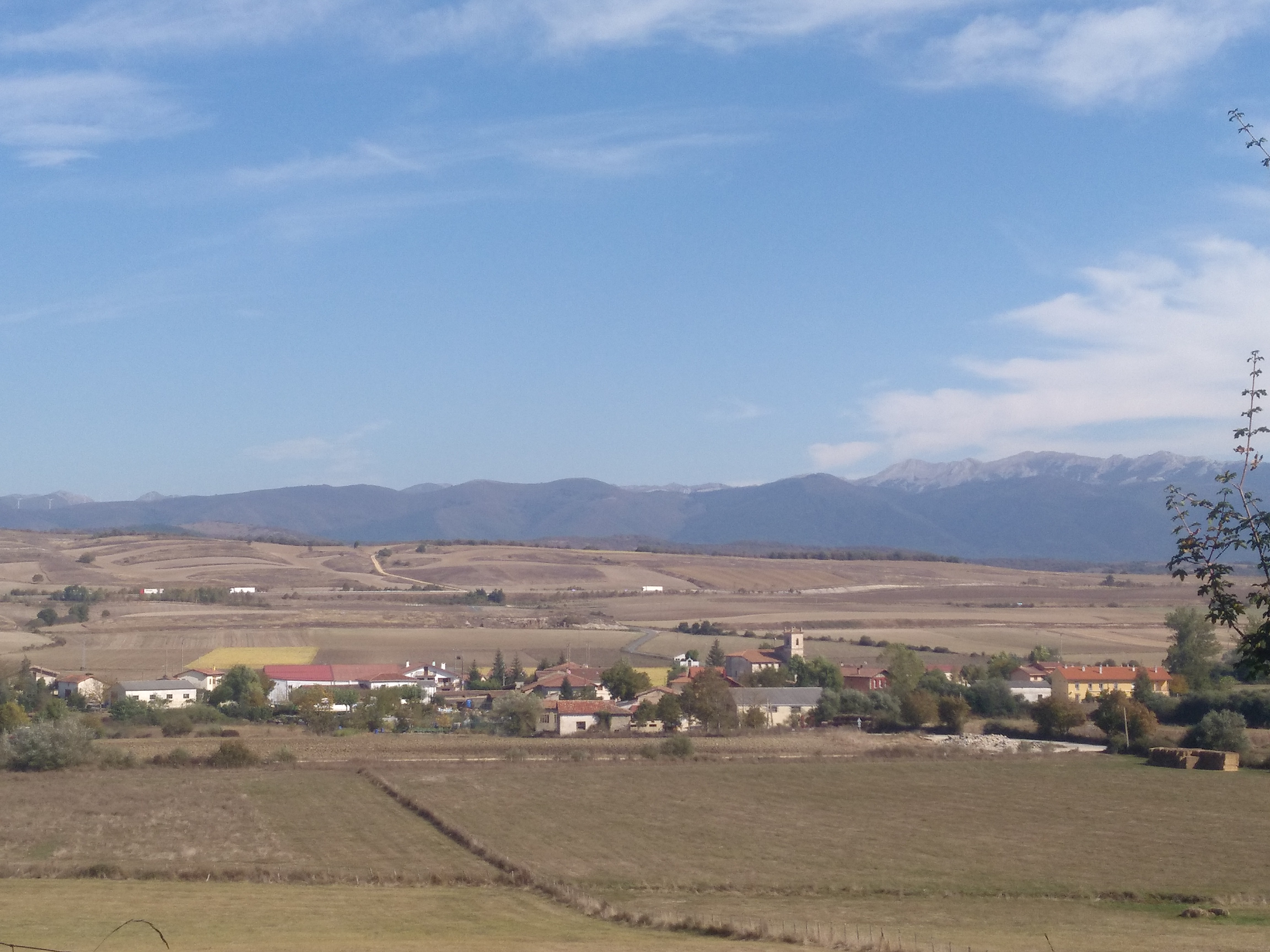
- View of Ezkerekotxa

- Coat of arms

- Location within Álava Location within the Basque Country Location within Spain
- Coordinates: 42°50′53″N 2°27′12″W
- Country: Spain
- Autonomous community: Basque Country
- Province: Álava
- Comarca: Llanada Alavesa
- Municipality: Iruraiz-Gauna

Area
  - Total: 4.78 km^{2} (1.85 sq mi)
- Elevation: 579 m (1,900 ft)

Population (2022)
  - Total: 46
  - Density: 9.6/km^{2} (25/sq mi)
- Postal code: 01206

Ezkerekotxa (Spanish: Ezquerecocha) is a hamlet and concejo located in the municipality of Iruraiz-Gauna, in Álava province, Basque Country, Spain. As of 2022, it has a population of 46. The local parish church is dedicated to San Román.
