= Arrieta, Álava =

Hamlet in Álava, Spain

Arrieta
- Concejo
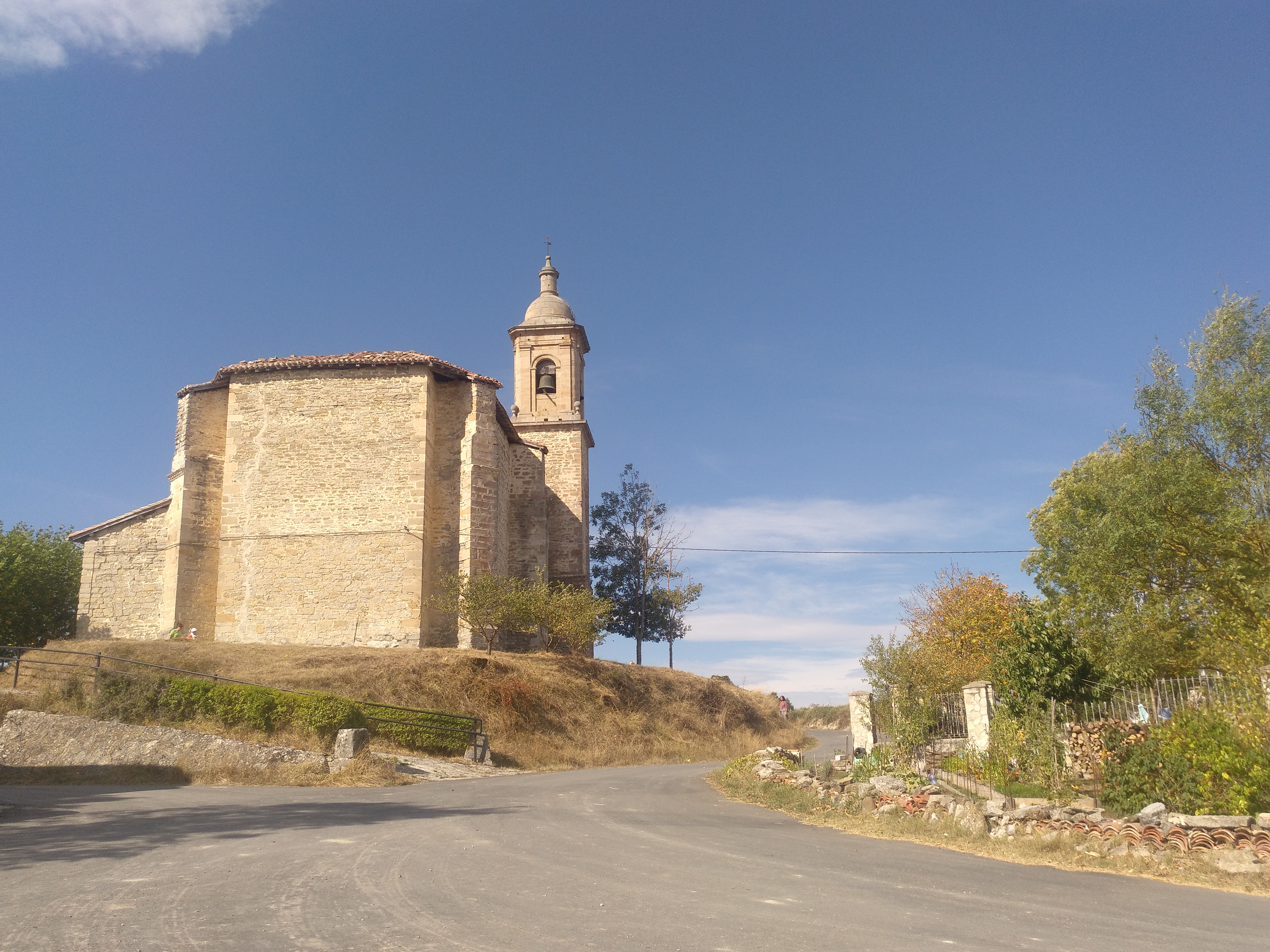
- Church of Santa María Magdalena in Arrieta

- Location within Álava Location within the Basque Country Location within Spain
- Coordinates: 42°51′31″N 2°28′29″W
- Country: Spain
- Autonomous community: Basque Country
- Province: Álava
- Comarca: Llanada Alavesa
- Municipality: Iruraiz-Gauna

Area
  - Total: 3.40 km^{2} (1.31 sq mi)
- Elevation: 587 m (1,926 ft)

Population (2023)
  - Total: 37
  - Density: 11/km^{2} (28/sq mi)
- Postal code: 01206

Arrieta is a hamlet and concejo in the municipality of Iruraiz-Gauna, in Álava province, Basque Country, Spain.
