= Argomaniz =

Village in Álava, Spain

- Concejo
- Coat of arms

- Location within Álava Location within the Basque Country Location within Spain
- Coordinates: 42°52′N 2°33′W
- Country: Spain
- Autonomous community: Basque Country
- Province: Álava
- Comarca: Llanada Alavesa
- Municipality: Elburgo/Burgelu

Area
  - Total: 4.68 km^{2} (1.81 sq mi)
- Elevation: 602 m (1,975 ft)

Population (2022)
  - Total: 185
  - Density: 39.5/km^{2} (102/sq mi)
- Postal code: 01192

Argomaniz (Basque pronunciation: [arɣomanis̻], alternatively in Basque: Argomaiz [arɣomais̻]; Spanish: Argómaniz [aɾˈɣomaniθ]) is a village and concejo located in the municipality of Elburgo/Burgelu, in Álava province, Basque Country, Spain.

== Places of interest ==
The village is home to a parador, established in 1978, located in the seventeenth-century Larrea palace. It is a Renaissance building where Napoleon rested prior to the assault on Vitoria.
