= Trokoniz =

Hamlet in Álava, Spain

- Concejo
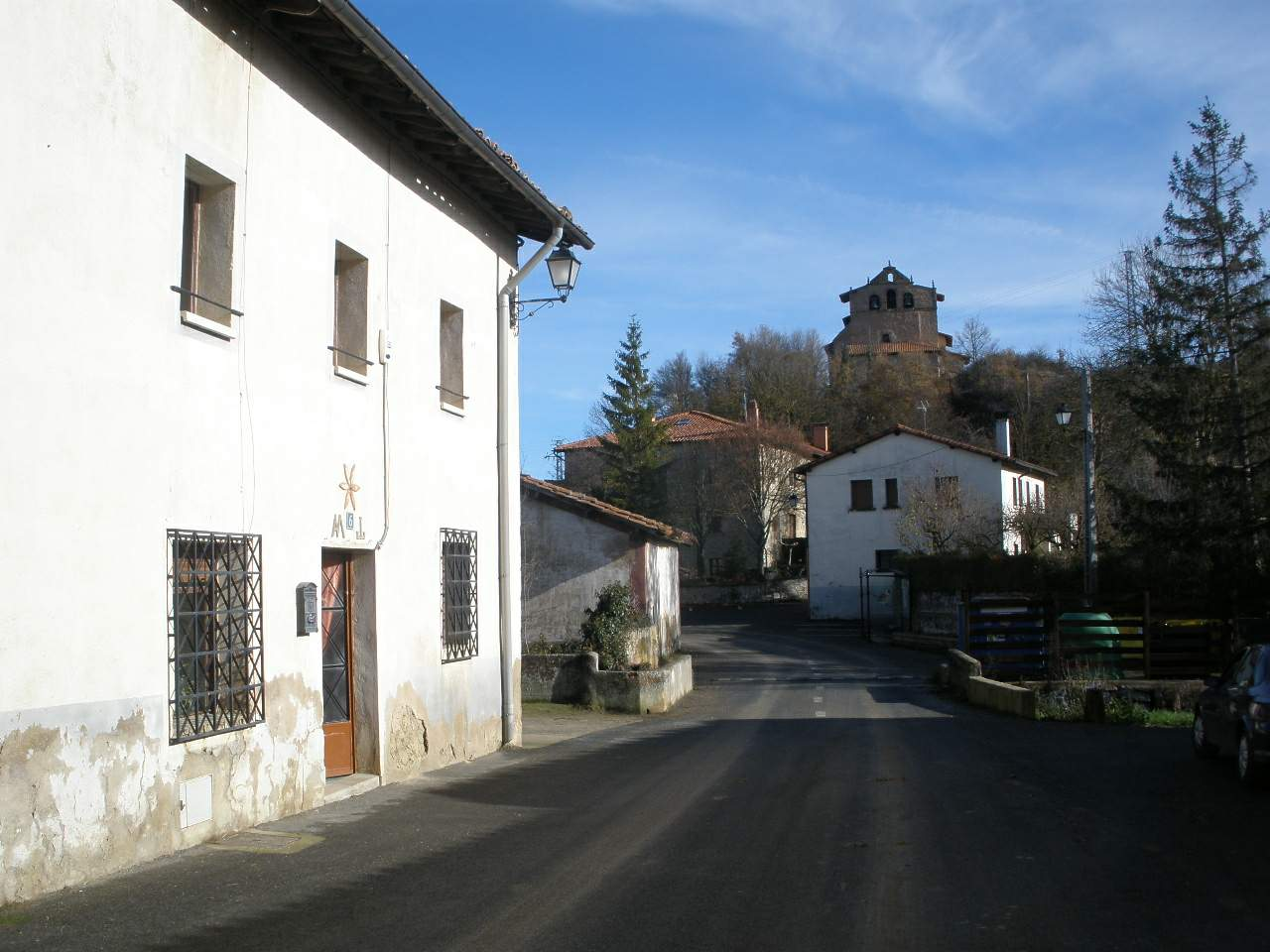
- View of Trokoniz

- Location within Álava Location within the Basque Country Location within Spain
- Coordinates: 42°49′32″N 2°33′21″W
- Country: Spain
- Autonomous community: Basque Country
- Province: Álava
- Comarca: Llanada Alavesa
- Municipality: Iruraiz-Gauna

Area
  - Total: 4.53 km^{2} (1.75 sq mi)
- Elevation: 599 m (1,965 ft)

Population (2023)
  - Total: 75
  - Density: 17/km^{2} (43/sq mi)
- Postal code: 01193

Trokoniz (Spanish: Trocóniz) is a hamlet and concejo in the municipality of Iruraiz-Gauna, in Álava province, Basque Country, Spain.
