= Guereñu =

Hamlet in Álava, Spain

Gereñu
- Concejo
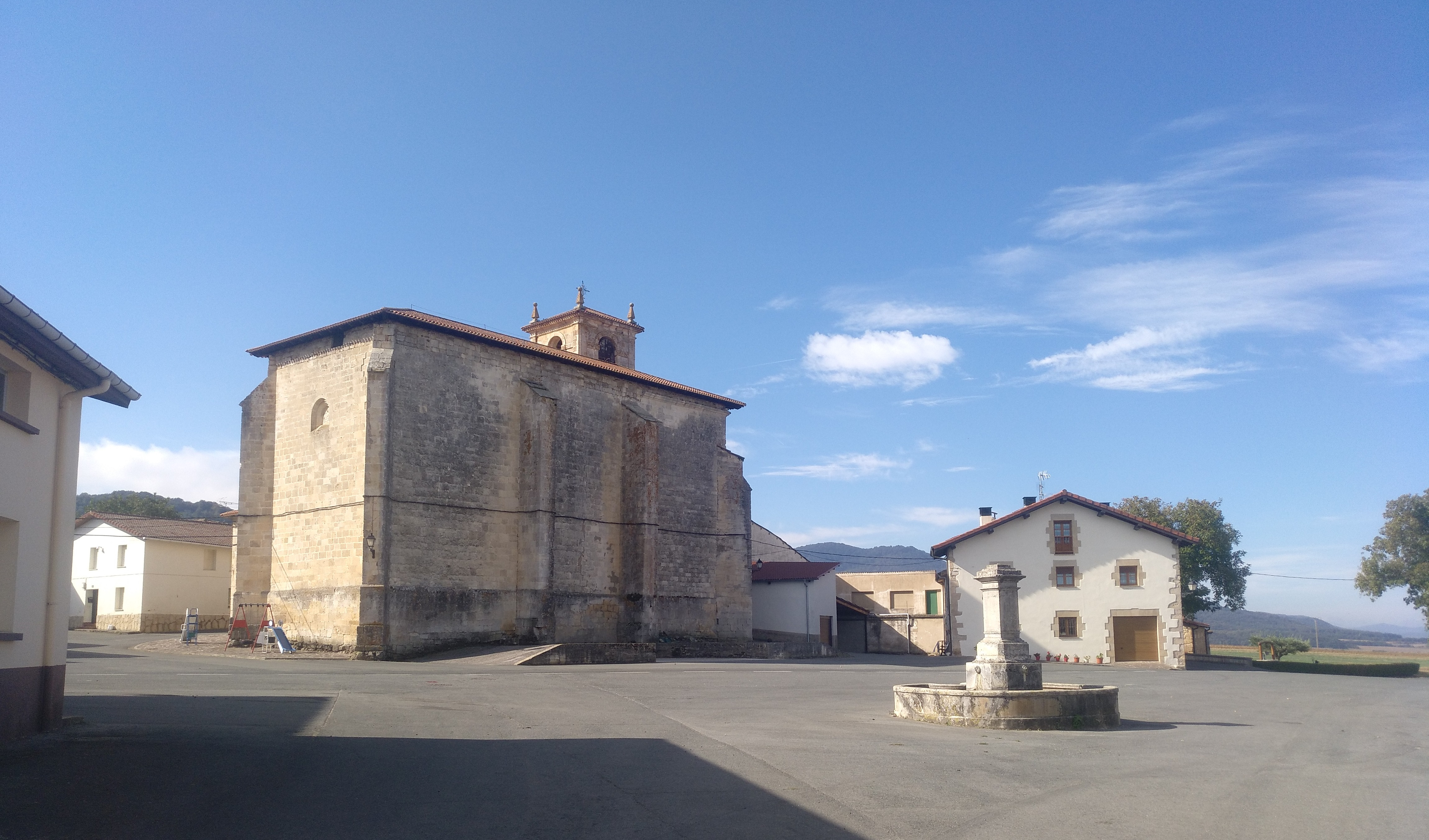

- Location within Álava Location within the Basque Country Location within Spain
- Coordinates: 42°48′55″N 2°26′34″W
- Country: Spain
- Autonomous community: Basque Country
- Province: Álava
- Comarca: Llanada Alavesa
- Municipality: Iruraiz-Gauna

Area
  - Total: 5.22 km^{2} (2.02 sq mi)
- Elevation: 681 m (2,234 ft)

Population (2022)
  - Total: 34
  - Density: 6.5/km^{2} (17/sq mi)
- Postal code: 01207

Gereñu (Spanish: Guereñu) is a hamlet and concejo located in the municipality of Iruraiz-Gauna, in Álava province, Basque Country, Spain. The local parish church, dedicated to the Assumption of Mary, is the most notable building in Gereñu.
