= Elburgo/Burgelu =

Elburgo / Burgelu
- Municipality
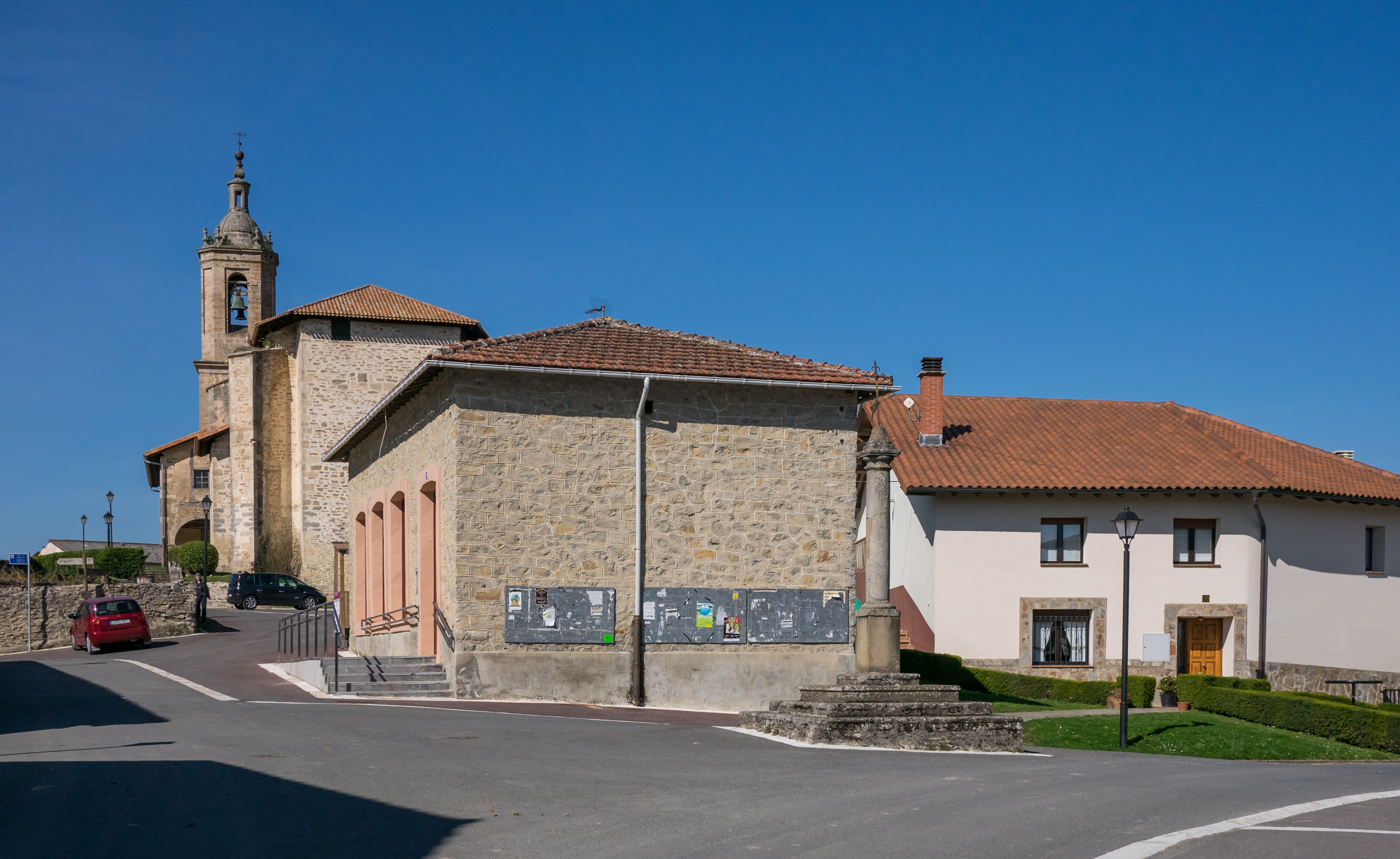
- Village centre of Elburgo/Burgelu

- Coat of arms

- Location of Elburgo/Burgelu within the Basque Country
- Coordinates: 42°51′N 2°32′W
- Country: Spain
- Autonomous Community: Basque Country
- Province: Álava
- Comarca: Llanada Alavesa

Government
  - Mayor: María Natividad López de Munain Alzola

Area
  - Total: 32 km^{2} (12 sq mi)
- Elevation (AMSL): 549 m (1,801 ft)

Population (2025-01-01)
  - Total: 642
  - Density: 20/km^{2} (52/sq mi)
- Time zone: UTC+1 (CET)
  - Summer (DST): UTC+2 (CEST (GMT +2))
- Postal code: 01192

Elburgo in Spanish or Burgelu in Basque is a village and municipality located in the province of Álava, in the Basque Country, northern Spain.

The municipality officially has a dual name, "Elburgo/Burgelu", reflecting the officially bilingual status of this province of Spain. However, in practice the municipality and village are commonly referred to by one or the other name, depending on the language.

The municipality encompasses an area of some 32 km². In 2004, its recorded population was 453 inhabitants.

Elburgo comprises six villages and their respective communes (concejos):

- Añua
- Arbulu
- Argomaniz
- Elburgo (the municipality's capital and largest settlement)
- Gazeta
- Hijona - Ixona
