= Añua =

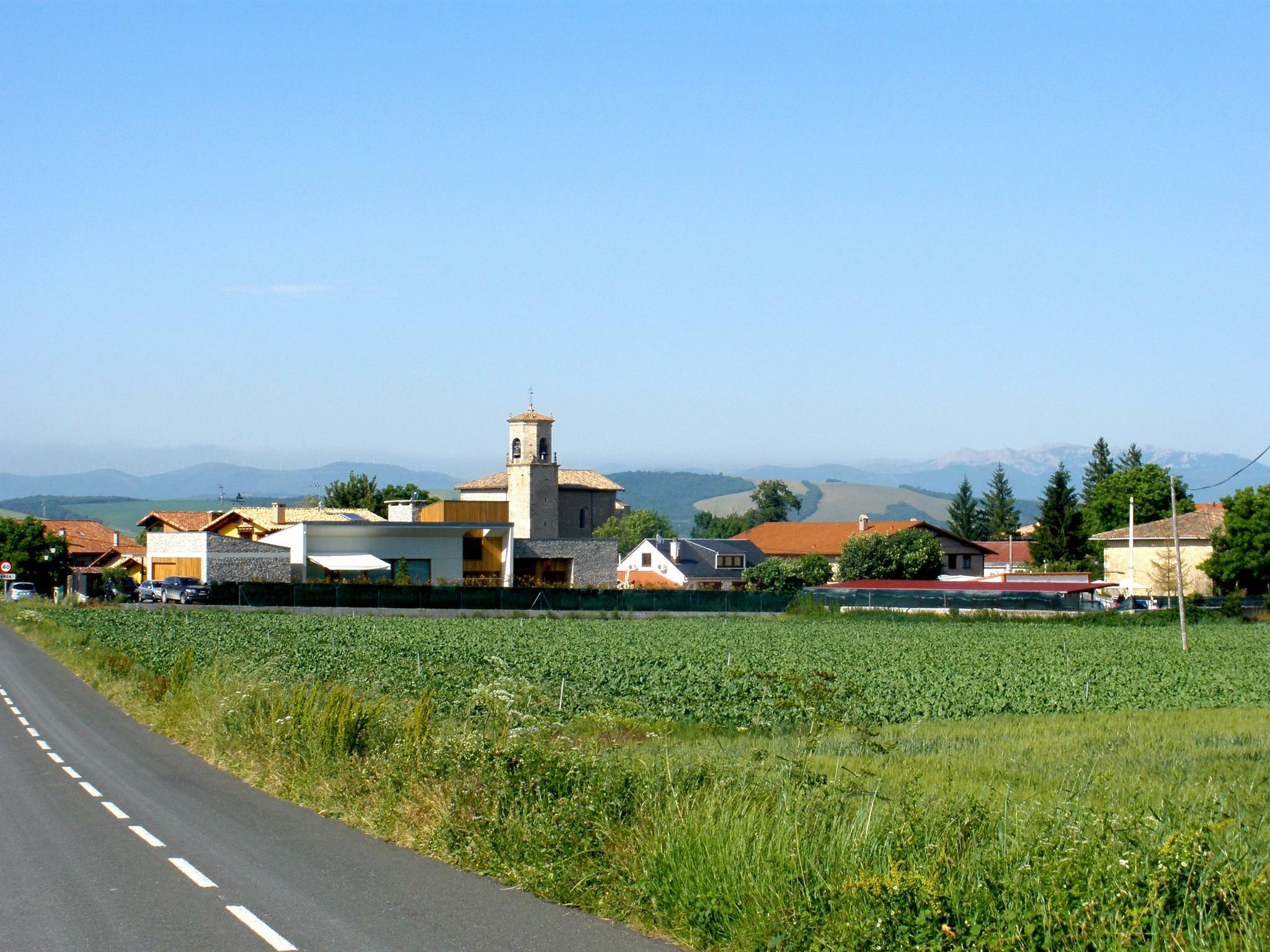

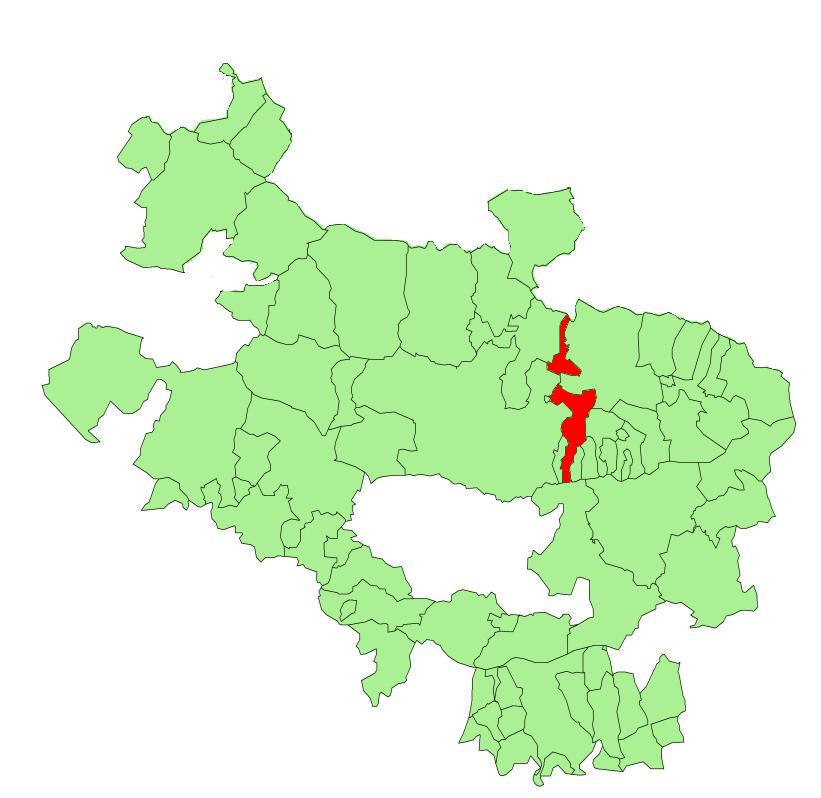
- Elburgo municipality in Alava Province

- Location of Añua within the Basque Country Location of Añua within Spain
- Coordinates: 42°50′N 2°32′W
- Country: Spain

Government
  - Mayoress: María Natividad López
- Elevation: 564 m (1,850 ft)

Population (2007)
  - Total: 31

Añua is a village in Elburgo municipality, in the province of Álava, Basque Country, Spain. The population of Añua was 31 inhabitants in 2007 but this has changed through the years and the population has grown consequently. It is 564 metres (1,850 ft) from the sea. A building that is in the small village is the nativity church which was built in the 13th century, because of this ancient monument many people from the localities nearby come to admire it. There are also some old houses with architectural interest, some of rural style and others more modern from the 16th century.

There is also a mill, which has a mythological story which is told every Saint John's Day to little kids. The story is about a man who worked in mill. One day it was raining so hard that he couldn't move from the mill because he was scared, but it also was too dangerous to stay there. So he called the “Galtzagorris”, which are some small mythological creatures that lived in the woods. These special creatures showed the miller the way home while they sang. Nowadays it is very common to see people from other villages coming to Añua to watch the show.

There are also some special celebrations during the night of Hallowe'en. This is prepared by the whole council.

The fiestas of the locality are the first weekend of September, the Nativity Day, which is the patroness of Añua.

== Nativity church ==
Añua is an old and small group of country houses which has inside it a parish temple which has a direct influence with the old Basque Santiago's way of the interior and of artistic interest thanks to its presbytery and its abside from the 13th century. Experts place its style in the transition between the Romanic and the Progothic. This combination presents a slender decoration based on little columns, canes, blind sharp arches and splayed sharp windows, but with Romanic vices. They also appear as vegetal, animal and human carvings.

The rest of the temple is subsequent, and its different elements were built-in in the next centuries. The entrance door in Gothic, from the 15th century, the nave and the Otazu- Guevera's Chapel are Gothic-renaissance from the 16th century, the sacristy is baroque from the 17th century and the tower was rebuilt in the 18th century. Inside what stands out are the mayor retable, from the baroque in the 17th century, and the Saint Sebastian Triptych from the renaissance, the 16th century. Nowadays, there are also some handmade representations of the nativity scene made by people from the whole council which some are very impressive to see. Many tourists visit the village to admire the old church and its surroundings and to know more about its history.

== Gallery ==
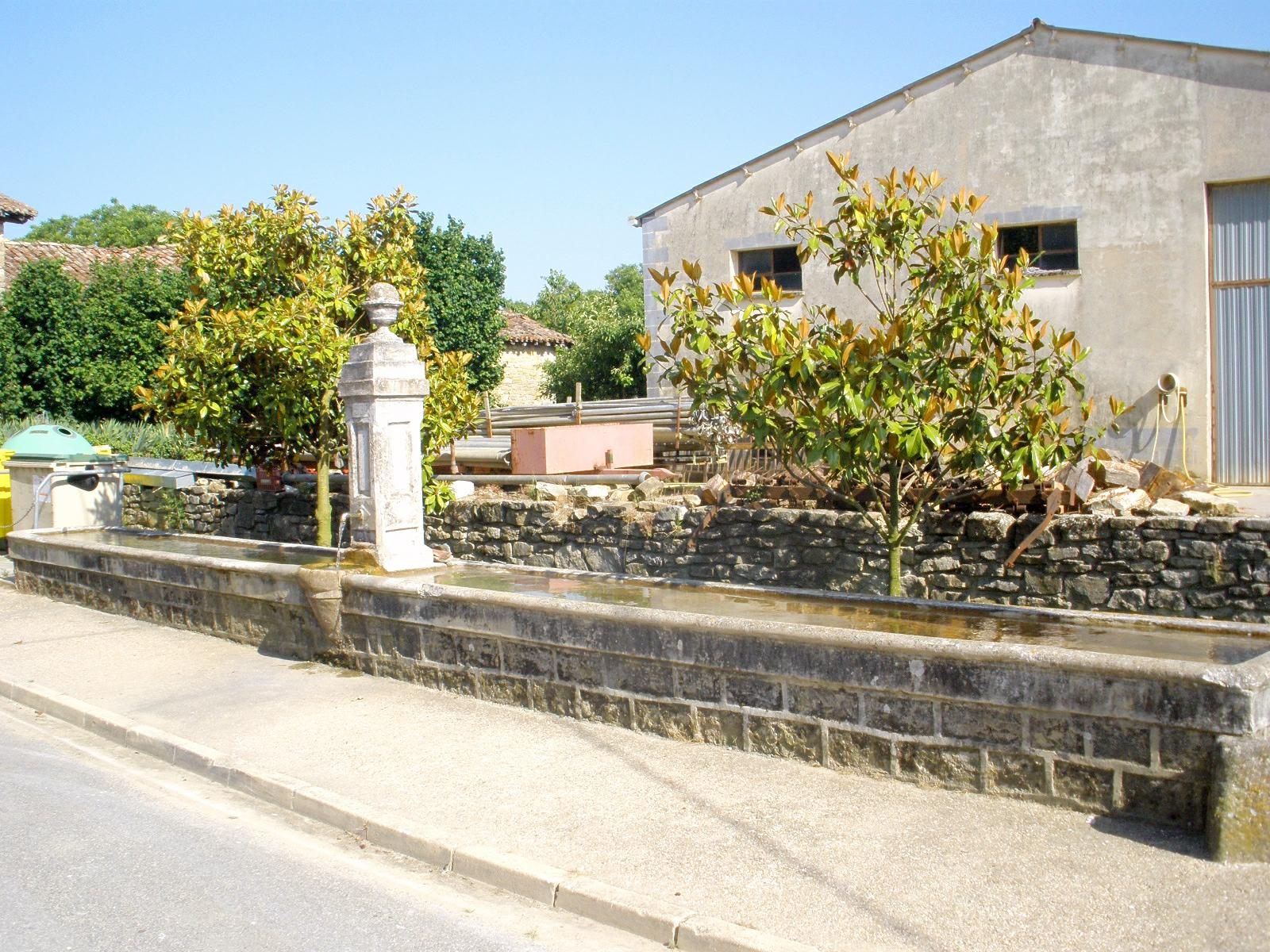
Fountain

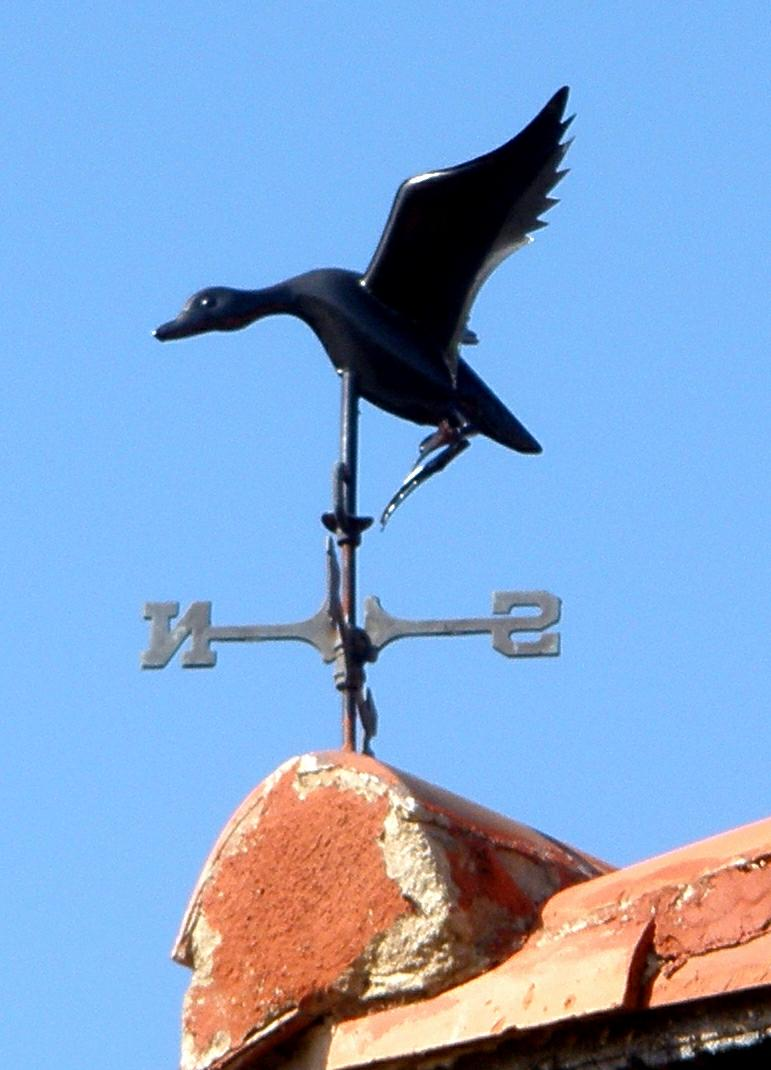
Weather vane in Añua

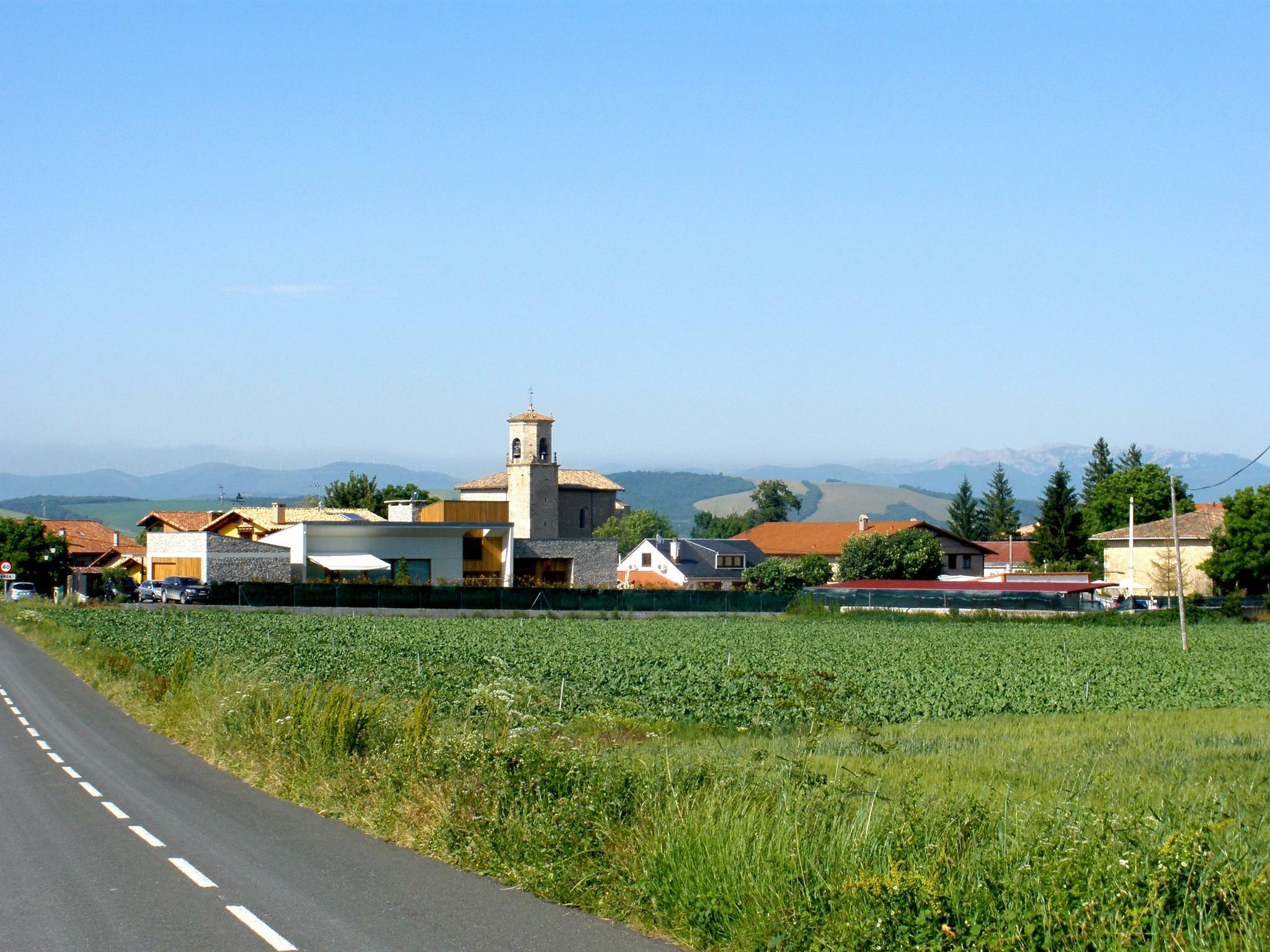

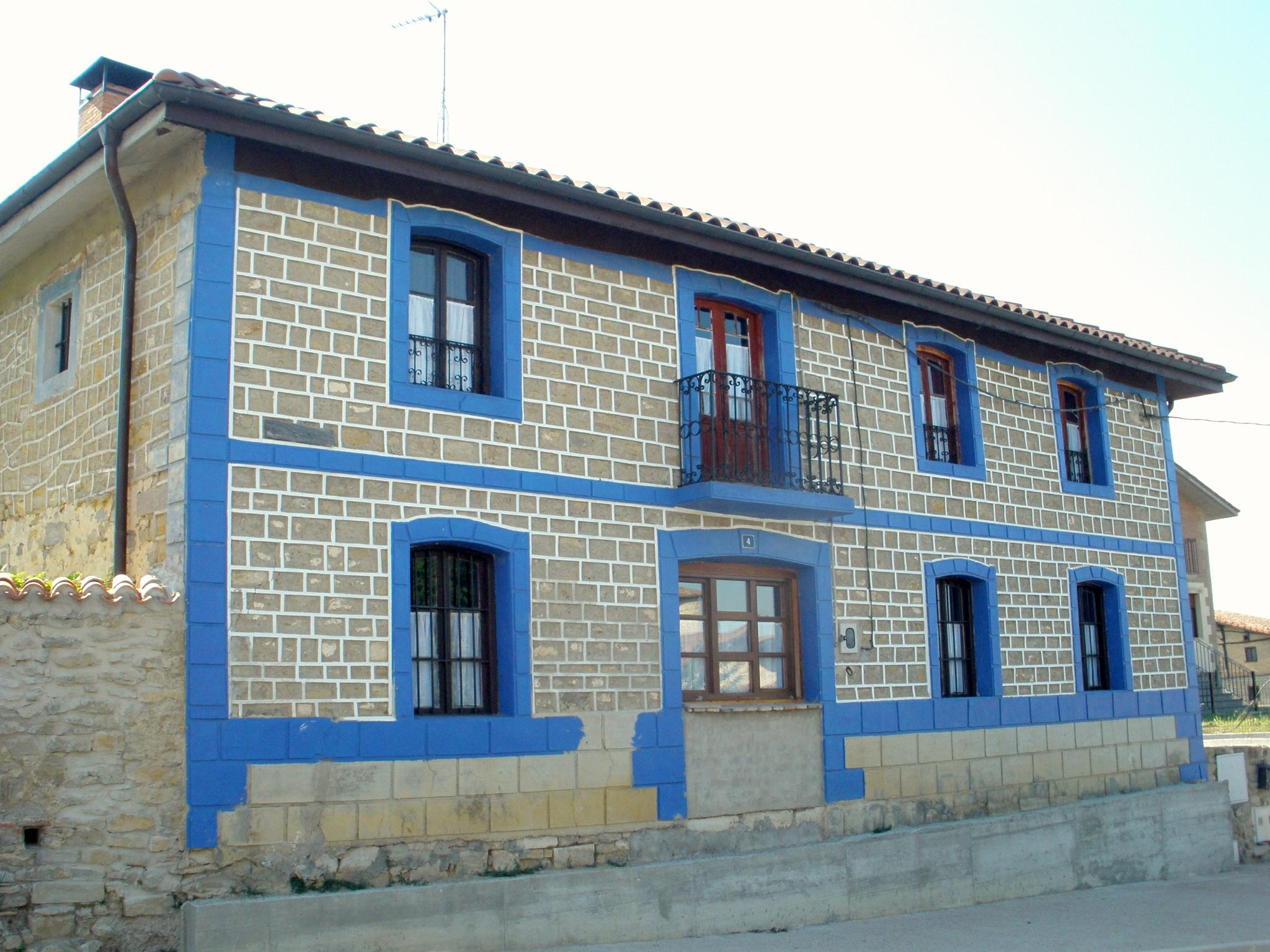
House in Añua

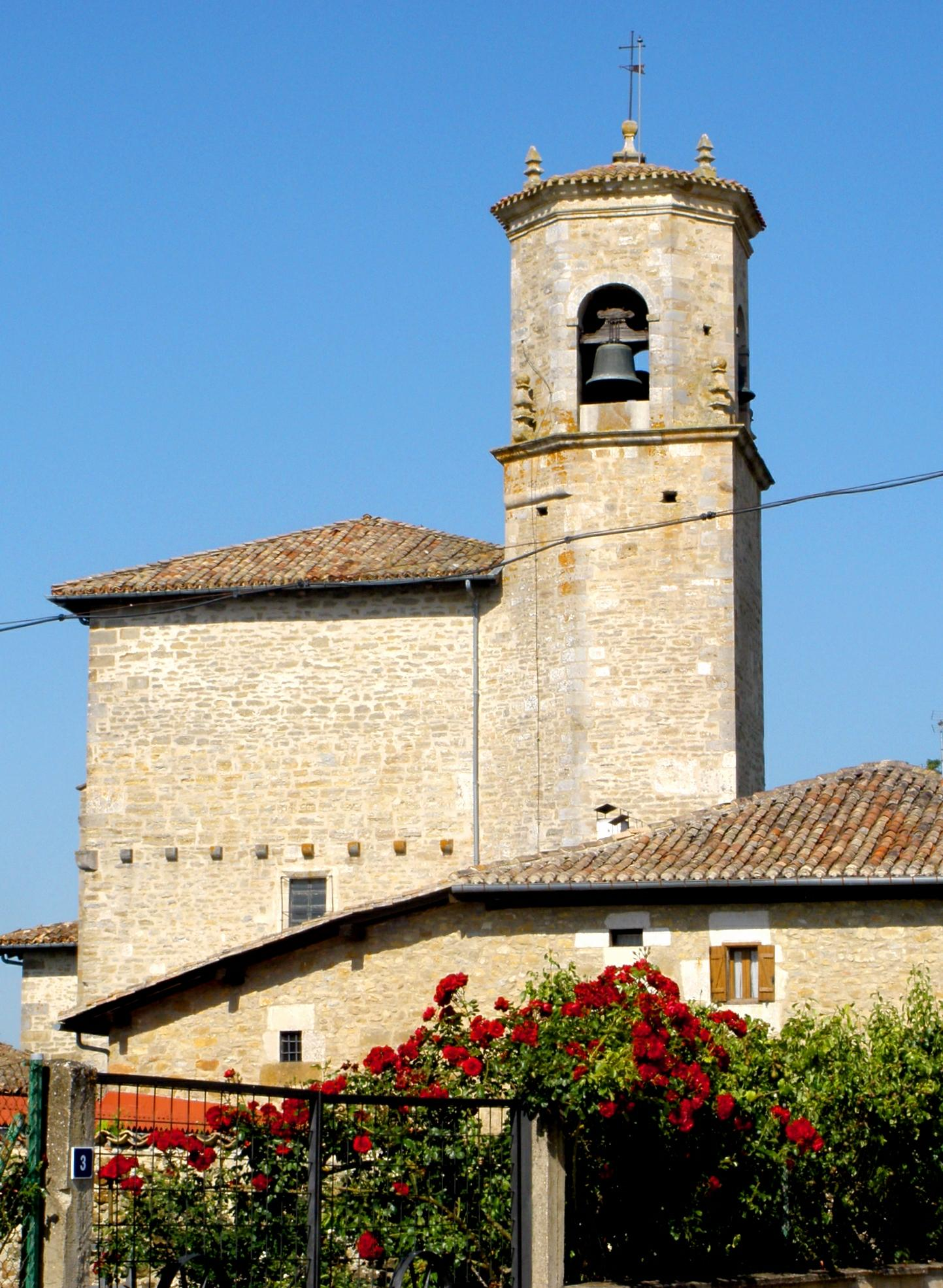
Church of the Nativity

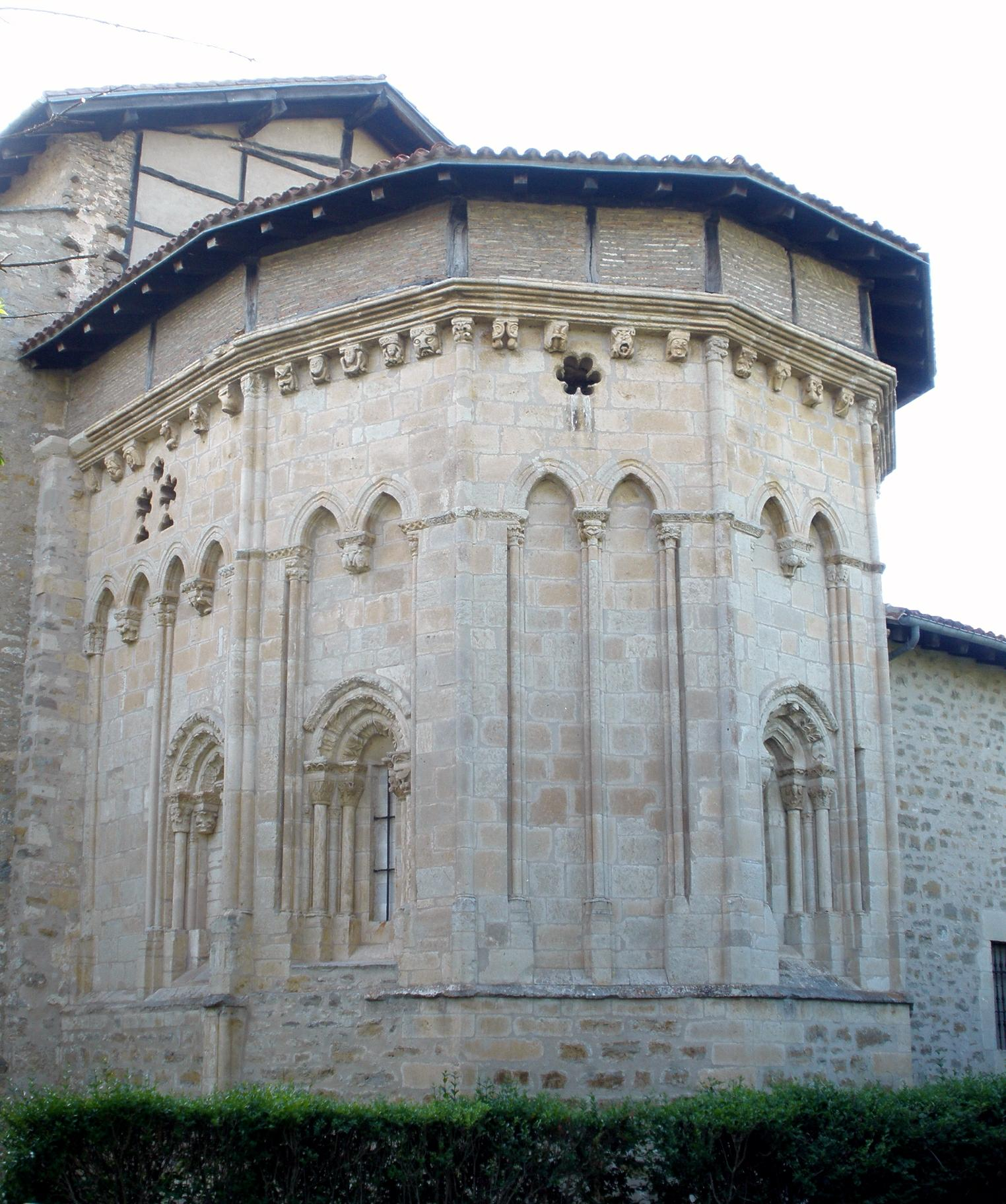
Church of the Nativity

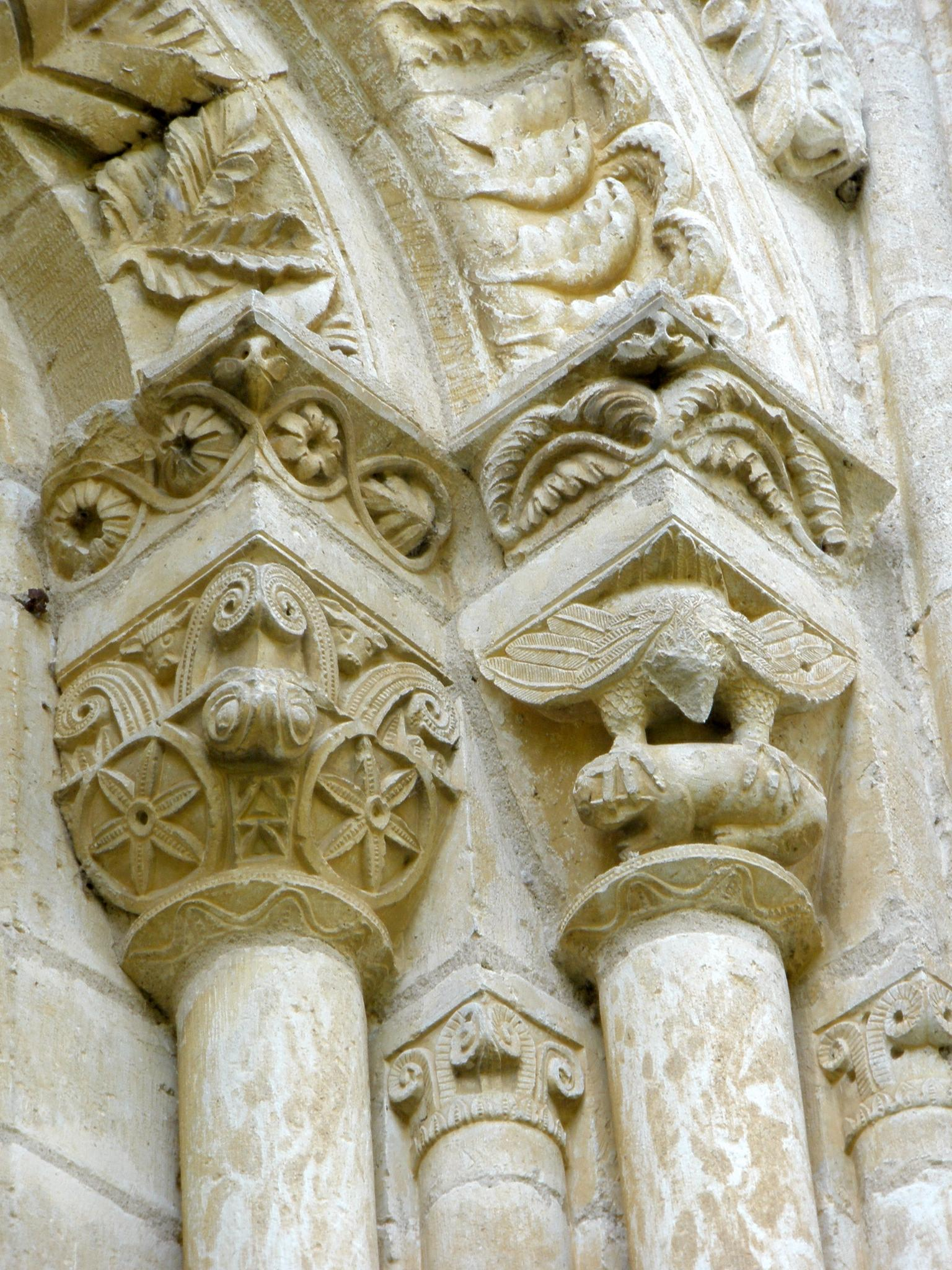
Church of the Nativity

== See also ==
- Towns in Spain
