= Gazeta, Álava =

Hamlet in Álava

Gazeta
- Concejo
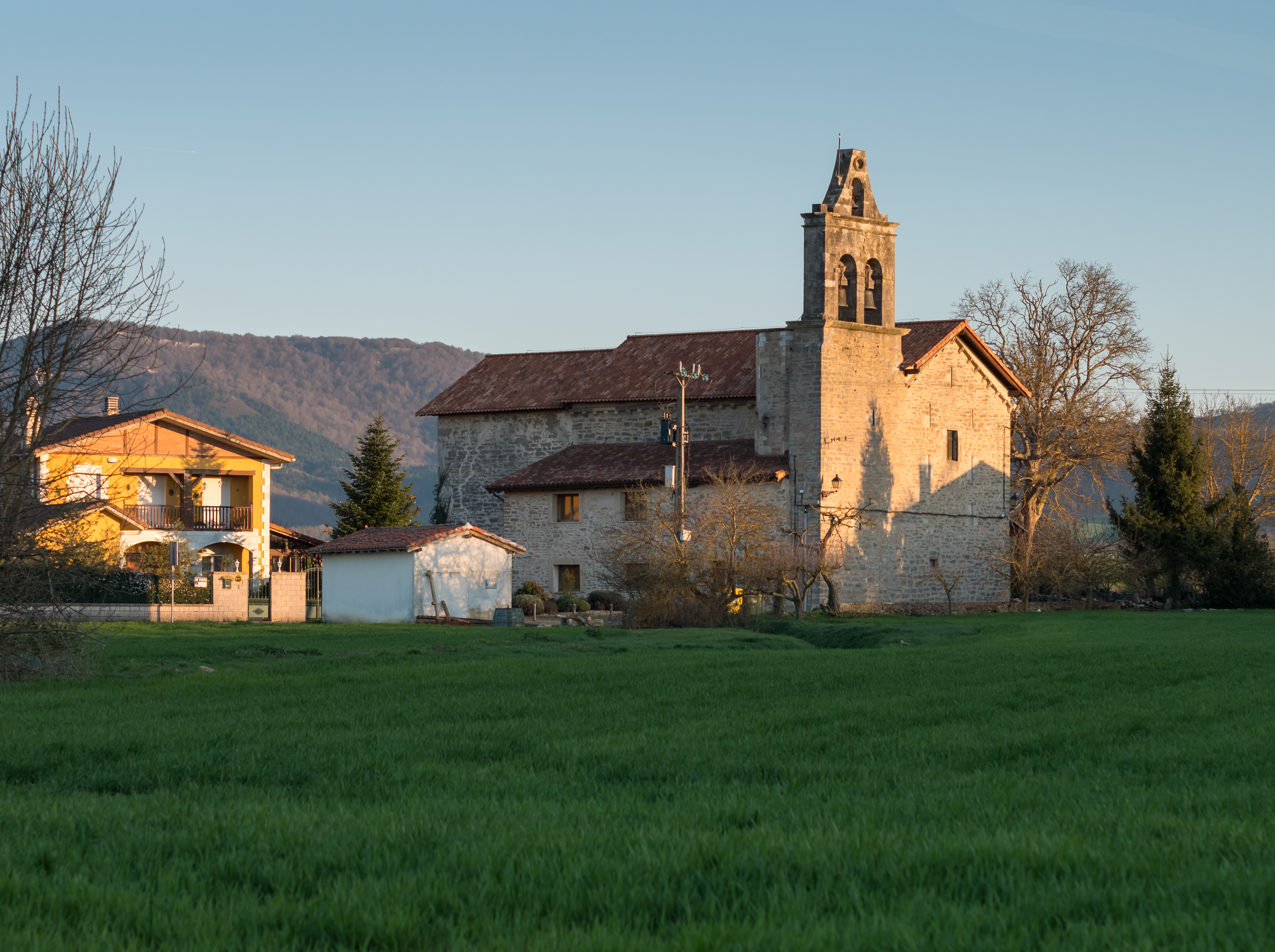
- Parish church

- Coat of arms

- Location within Álava Location within the Basque Country Location within Spain
- Coordinates: 42°50′36″N 2°32′18″W
- Country: Spain
- Autonomous community: Basque Country
- Province: Álava
- Comarca: Llanada Alavesa
- Municipality: Elburgo/Burgelu

Area
  - Total: 1.59 km^{2} (0.61 sq mi)
- Elevation: 547 m (1,795 ft)

Population (2022)
  - Total: 50
  - Density: 31/km^{2} (81/sq mi)
- Postal code: 01192

Gazeta (Basque pronunciation: [gas̻eta], Spanish: Gáceta [ˈɡaθeta]) is a hamlet and concejo located in the municipality of Elburgo/Burgelu, in Álava province, Basque Country, Spain.

== Place names ==
A Gazaheta is cited in the Reja de San Millán, from 1025, although there is no absolute certainty that it refers to this town.

== Physical geography ==
The council is located on a plain at an altitude of 547 m, on the right bank of the Añua River, about 13 km east of Vitoria, and is part of the Cuadrilla de Llanada Alavesa .
