= Iruraiz-Gauna =

- Municipality
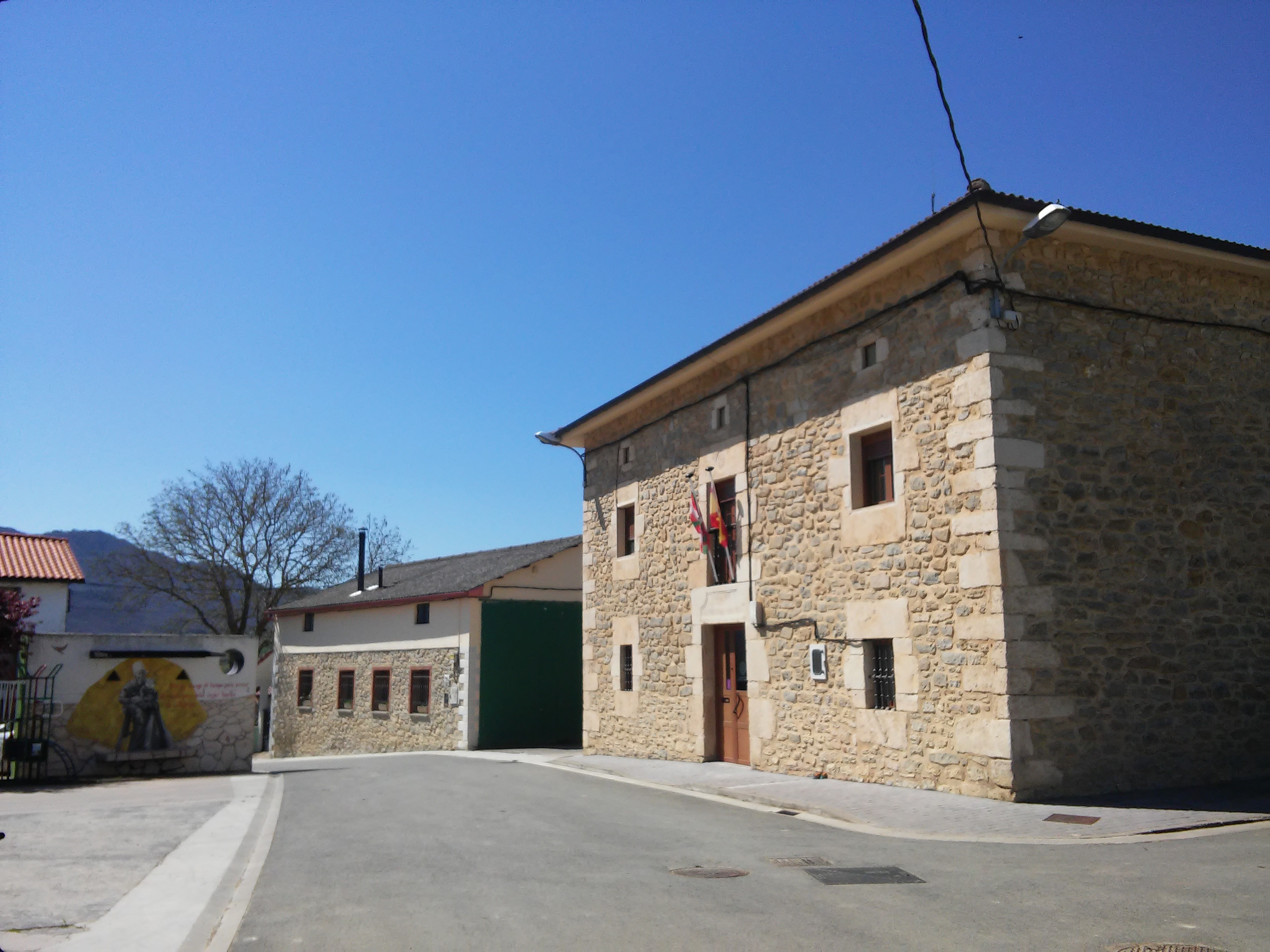
- Azilu in Iruraiz-Gauna

- Coat of arms

- Location within Álava Location within Spain
- Coordinates: 42°49′40″N 2°30′00″W
- Country: Spain
- Autonomous Community: Basque Country
- Province: Álava
- Cuadrilla: Llanada Alavesa

Government
  - Mayor: Susana Díaz de Arcaya Cubillo (EAJ-PNV)

Area
  - Total: 47.6 km^{2} (18.4 sq mi)
- Elevation (AMSL): 625 m (2,051 ft)

Population (2025-01-01)
  - Total: 559
  - Density: 11.7/km^{2} (30.4/sq mi)
- Time zone: UTC+1 (CET)
  - Summer (DST): UTC+2 (CEST)
- Postal code: 01206, 01207, 01993
- Website: www.iruraiz-gauna.com

Iruraiz-Gauna (Spanish pronunciation: [iɾuˈɾajθ ˈɣawna], Basque pronunciation: [iɾu.ɾajs̪ ɣawna]) is a municipality located in the province of Álava, in the Basque Country, northern Spain.

== Geography ==
=== Administrative subdivisions ===
Iruraiz-Gauna is divided into 11 villages, all of which are organized as concejos. Two parts of the municipality aren't integrated in any concejo: the Comunal de Ilarra and Orgazi.

Arms	Official name (Note: The official names of the villages that constitute the municipality are in Basque.)	Basque name	Spanish name	Population	Area (km^{2})	Notes
	Alaitza	Alaitza	Alaiza	65	3.76	Concejo
	Arrieta	Arrieta	Arrieta	41	3.40	Concejo
	Azilu	Azilu	Acilu	27	1.27	Concejo
–	Comunal de Ilarra	Ilarrako erkidegoa	Comunal de Ilarra	–	0.59	Agricultural common managed by Gazeo, Ezkerekotxa and Langarika.
	Erentxun	Erentxun	Erenchun	80	7.66	Concejo
	Ezkerekotxa	Ezkerekotxa	Ezquerecocha	43	4.78	Concejo
	Gauna	Gauna	Gauna	68	5.96	Concejo
	Gazeo	Gazeo	Gaceo	50	2.44	Concejo
–	Gereñu	Gereñu	Guereñu	36	5.12	Concejo
–	Jauregi	Jauregi	Jáuregui	8	3.35	Concejo
–	Orgazi	Orgazi	Orgaci	–	0.50	Uninhabited enclave in Vitoria-Gasteiz. Also known as Uriarte.
	Langarika	Langarika	Langarica	33	4.16	Concejo
	Trokoniz	Trokoniz	Trocóniz	83	4.53	Concejo
