= Asparrena =

- Municipality
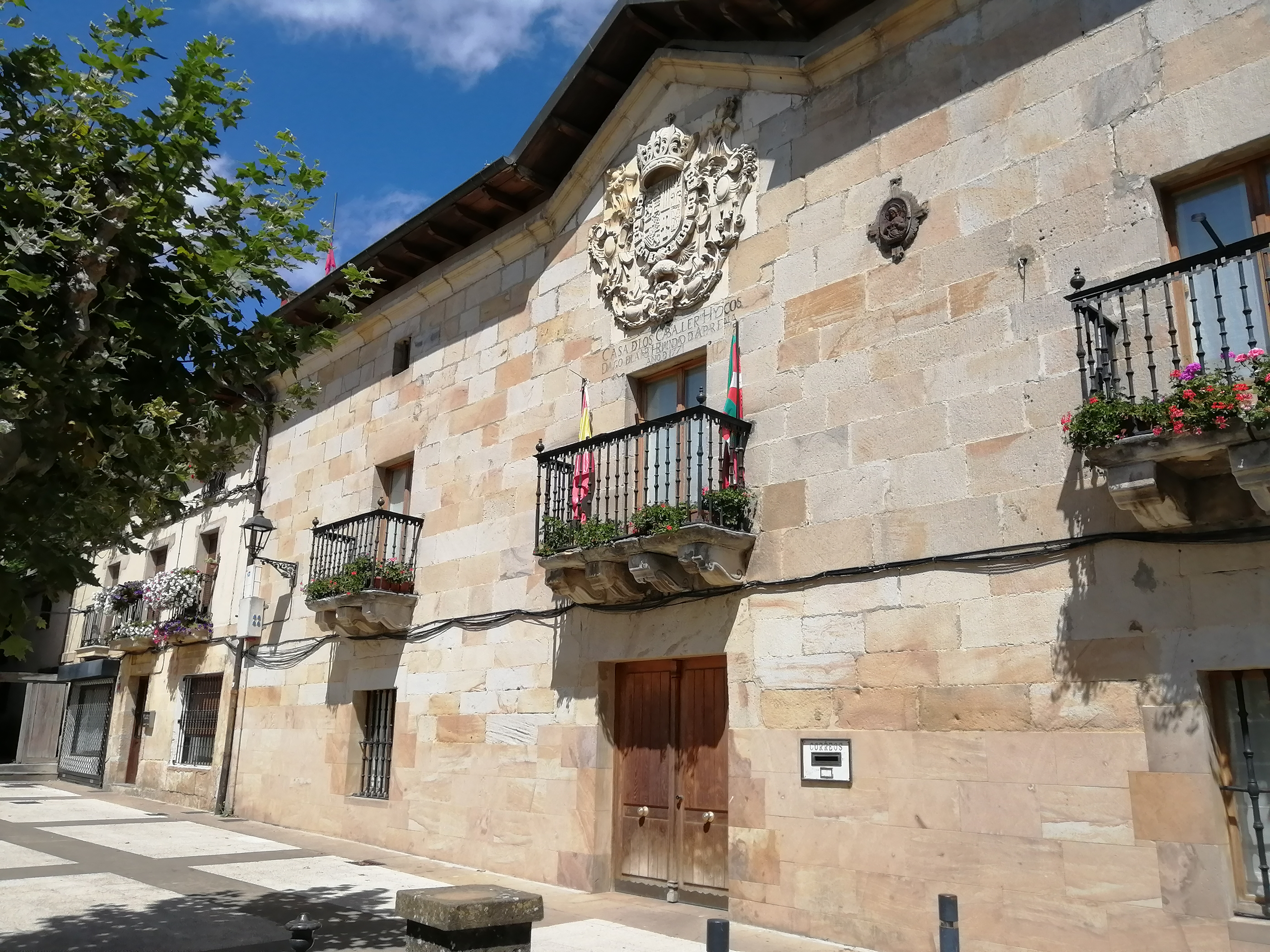
- Town hall of Asparrena in Araia

- Coat of arms

- Location of Asparrena within the Basque Country
- Coordinates: 42°53.74′N 2°19.26′W
- Country: Spain
- Autonomous Community: Basque Country
- Province: Álava
- Comarca: Llanada Alavesa

Government
  - Mayor: Diego Gastañares Zabaleta

Area
  - Total: 65.18 km^{2} (25.17 sq mi)
- Elevation (AMSL): 598 m (1,962 ft)

Population (2025-01-01)
  - Total: 1,609
  - Density: 24.69/km^{2} (63.94/sq mi)
- Time zone: UTC+1 (CET)
  - Summer (DST): UTC+2 (CEST (GMT +2))
- Postal code: 01208 / 01250

Asparrena (Spanish: Aspárrena, meaning 'down the rock') is a municipality located in the province of Álava, in the Basque Country, northern Spain. The municipality comprises various population nuclei, the main one being the town of Araia.

== See also ==
- Ilarduia
