= Luzárraga =

Luzárraga (also spelled Luzarraga or Lazarraga) is a surname of Basque origin. Notable people with the surname include:

- Asel Luzarraga (born 1971), Basque writer
- Francisco Aldecoa Luzárraga (born 1949), Spanish political scientist
- Francisco I Earl of Luzarraga, Admiral of the Spanish Navy
- José Manuel Etxeita Luzarraga (1841–1915), Basque writer
- Kepa Luzarraga (born 1993), Basque writer
- Maria Luzarraga, Basque actress
- Miguel Larrinaga Luzárraga, owner of the Larrinaga Palace
- Roberto Luzarraga (born 1991), Ecuadorian footballer
- Rosalía Olvera of Luzárraga (1923–2017), Head of the House of Luzárraga

== See also ==
- House of Luzárraga
- Lizárraga
- Luzuriaga (disambiguation)
