= Galarreta, Álava =

Hamlet in Álava, Spain

Galarreta
- Concejo
- Location within Álava Location within the Basque Country Location within Spain
- Coordinates: 42°54′N 2°22′W
- Country: Spain
- Autonomous community: Basque Country
- Province: Álava
- Comarca: Llanada Alavesa
- Municipality: San Millán/Donemiliaga

Area
  - Total: 8.43 km^{2} (3.25 sq mi)
- Elevation: 655 m (2,149 ft)

Population (2023)
  - Total: 36
  - Density: 4.3/km^{2} (11/sq mi)
- Postal code: 01208

Galarreta is a hamlet and concejo in the municipality of San Millán/Donemiliaga, in Álava province, Basque Country, Spain.
