= San Millán/Donemiliaga =

San Millán / Donemiliaga
- Municipality
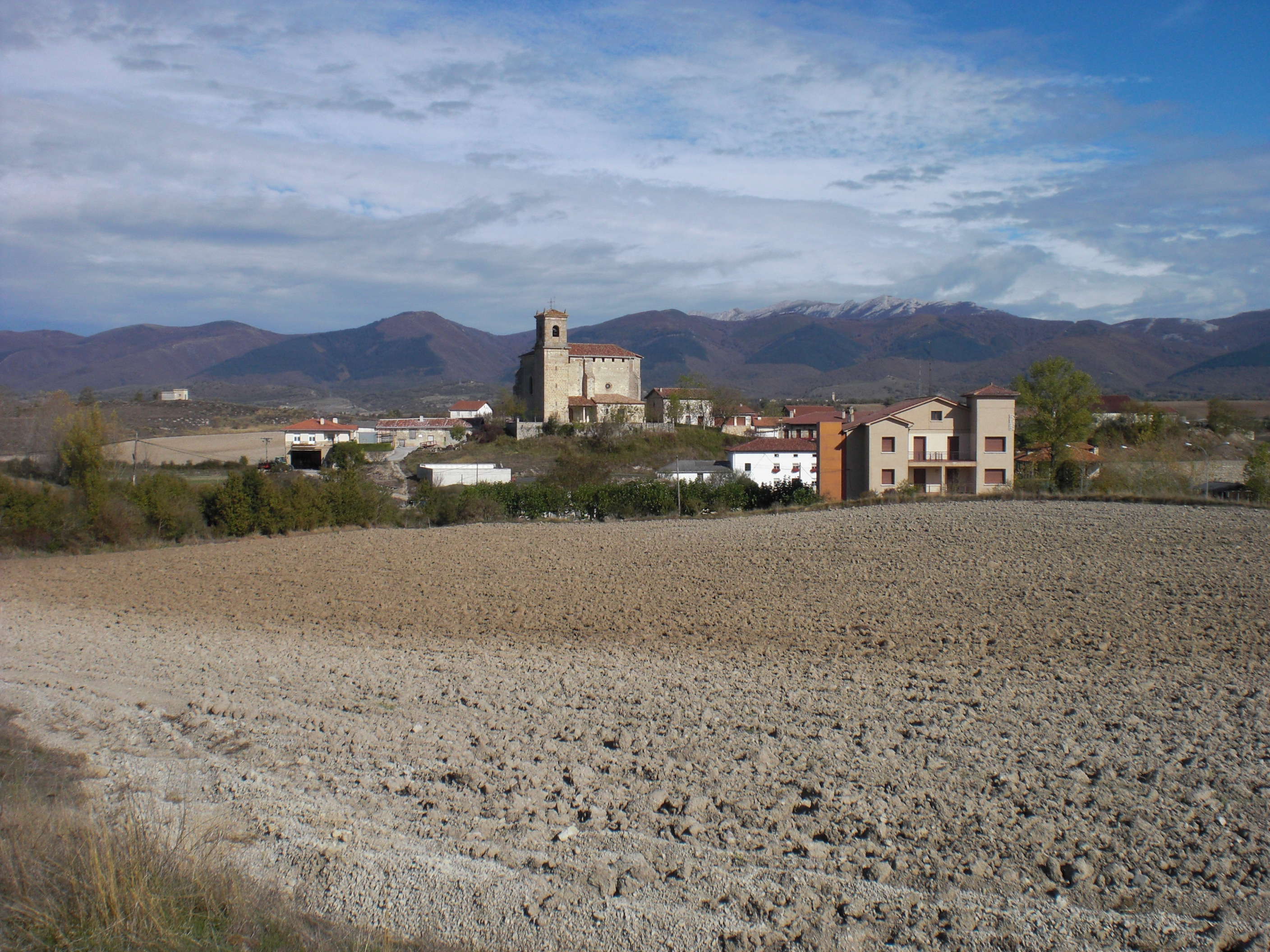

- Coat of arms

- Location within Basque Country San Millán / Donemiliaga (Spain)
- Coordinates: 42°52′29″N 2°22′34″W
- Country: Spain
- Autonomous community: Basque Country
- Province: Araba/Álava
- Eskualdea / Comarca: Rioja Alavesa
- Founded: before 1360

Government
  - Mayor: Erika Letamendi Hurtado (EH Bildu)

Area
  - Total: 8,541 km^{2} (3,298 sq mi)

Population (2025-01-01)
  - Total: 701
  - Density: 0.0821/km^{2} (0.213/sq mi)
- Time zone: UTC+1 (CET)
  - Summer (DST): UTC+2 (CEST)
- Postal code: 01208
- Official language(s): Basque, Spanish
- Website: Official website

San Millán in Spanish or Donemiliaga in Basque is a scattered municipality made up of several villages located in the province of Araba (Álava), in the Basque Country, northern Spain. Its biggest nucleus is the village San Roman, lying at the south of the important road axis E-5 E-80 N-1 cutting its way east to west through the Alavese Plains. Other localities include Galarreta and Munain.
