= Llanada Alavesa =

Comarca in Álava, Spain

Arabako Lautadako kuadrilla/Cuadrilla de la Llanada Alavesa
- Comarca
- Coat of arms

- Location within Álava
- Coordinates: 42°51′49″N 2°27′31″W
- Country: Spain
- Autonomous community: Basque Country
- Province: Álava
- Seat: Agurain/Salvatierra

Government
  - President of the Council: Rubén Ruiz de Eguino

Area
  - Total: 397 km^{2} (153 sq mi)

Population (2021)
  - Total: 12,584
  - Density: 31.7/km^{2} (82.1/sq mi)
- Time zone: UTC+1 (CET)
  - Summer (DST): UTC+2 (CEST)

Llanada Alavesa (Basque: Arabako Lautada) is one of the seven comarcas in Álava, Spain, consisting of eight municipalities. Its administrative center and largest municipality is Agurain/Salvatierra.

== Municipalities ==
Municipality	Population (2021)	Surface (in km²)
Agurain/Salvatierra	5,049	37.8
Alegría-Dulantzi	2,925	19.9
Asparrena	1,633	65.2
Barrundia	896	97.5
Elburgo	635	32.1
Iruraiz-Gauna	530	47.1
San Millán/Donemiliaga	723	85.4
Zalduondo	193	12.0
Total	12,584	397.0
