= List of municipalities in Álava =

Map of Spain with Araba/Álava highlighted

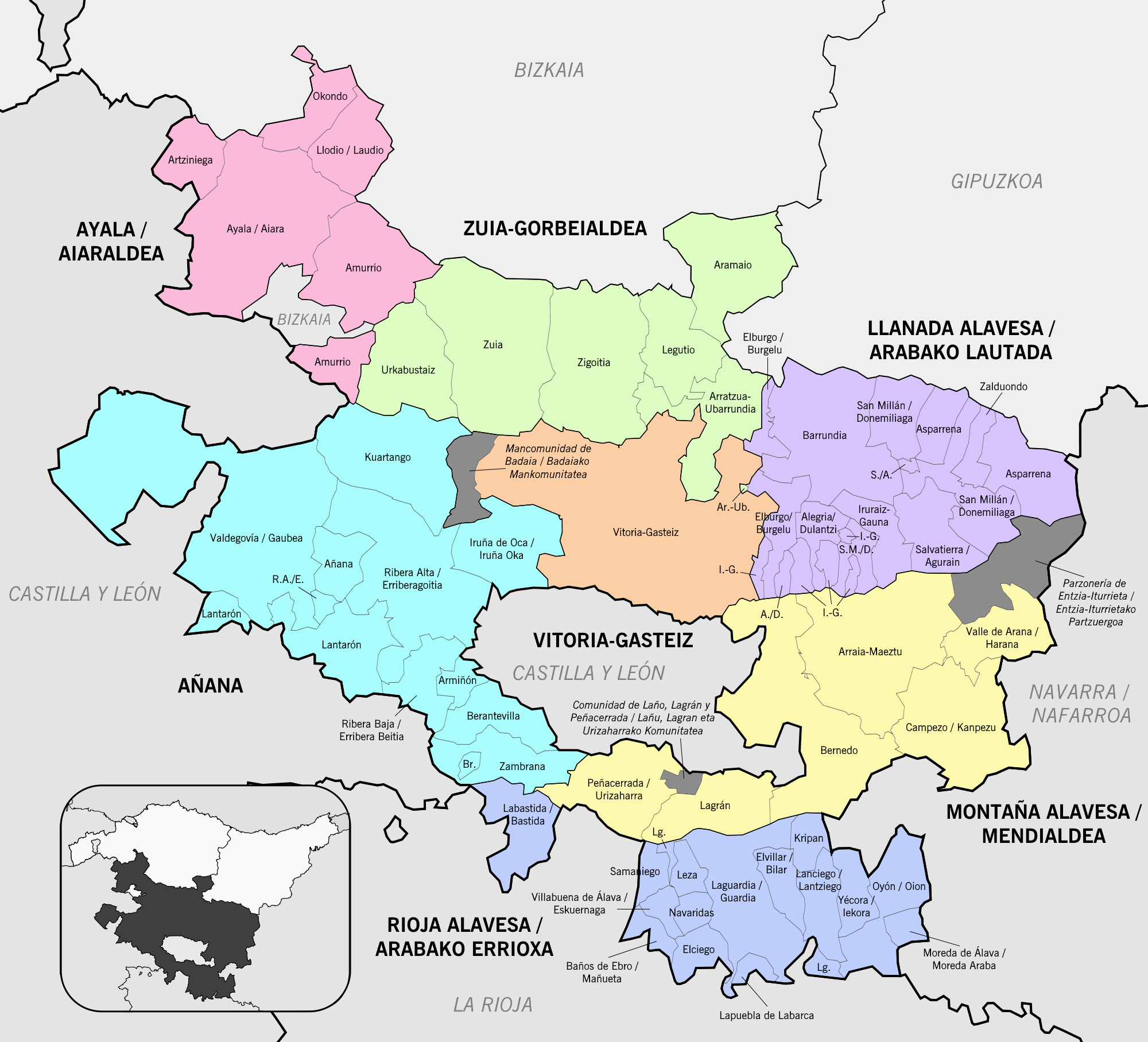
Map of the municipalities in the province of Araba/Álava arranged by cuadrillas

Araba/Álava is a province in the autonomous community of the Basque Country, Spain, that is divided into 51 municipalities. As of the 2023 Spanish census, the province is the 37th largest by population with 336,308 inhabitants but is the 48th largest by land area spanning 2,967.86 square kilometres (1,145.90 sq mi). Municipalities enjoy a large degree of autonomy in their local administration. Amongst other tasks, they are in charge of urban planning, water supply, lighting, road network, local police and firefighting.

Municipalities are the basic local political division in Spain, and can only belong to one province. The organisation of the municipalities is outlined in a local government law (Ley 7/1985, de 2 de abril, Reguladora de las Bases del Régimen Local) passed on 2 April 1985, completed by an 18 April 1986 royal decree. The Statute of Autonomy of the Basque Country of 1979 also contains provisions concerning the relations between the municipalities and the autonomous government of the Basque Country. All citizens of Spain are required to register in the municipality in which they reside. Each municipality is a corporation with independent legal personhood: its governing body is called the ayuntamiento (municipal council or corporation), a term often also used to refer to the municipal offices (city and town halls). The ayuntamiento is composed of the mayor (Spanish: alcalde), the deputy mayors (tenientes de alcalde) and the plenary assembly (pleno) of councillors (concejales). Municipalities are categorised by population for the purpose of determining the number of concejales: three when the population is up to 100 inhabitants, five for 101–250, seven for 251–1,000, nine for 1,001–2,000, eleven for 2,001–5,000, thirteen for 5,001–10,000, seventeen for 10,001–20,000, twenty-one for 20,001–50,000 and twenty-five for 50,001–100,000. One councillor is added for every additional 100,000 inhabitants, with a further one added when the number of concejales based on this methodology would be even in order to prevent tied votes.

The mayor and the deputy mayors are elected by the plenary assembly, which is itself elected by universal suffrage. Elections in municipalities with more than 250 inhabitants are carried out following a proportional representation system with closed lists, whilst those with a population lower than 250 use a block plurality voting system with open lists. The plenary assembly must meet periodically at the seat of the ayuntamiento, more or less often depending on the population of the municipality: monthly for those whose population is larger than 20,000, once every two months if it ranges between 5,001 and 20,000, and once every three months if it does not exceed 5,000. Many ayuntamientos also have a local governing board (Spanish: junta de gobierno local), named by the mayor from amongst the councillors—it is required for municipalities of more than 5,000 inhabitants. The junta de gobierno local, whose role is to assist the mayor between meetings of the plenary assembly, may not include more than one third of the councillors.

The largest municipality by population in the province of Araba/Álava as of the 2023 Spanish census is Vitoria-Gasteiz, its capital, with 255,423 residents, while the smallest is Añana with 156 residents. The largest municipality by area is also Vitoria-Gasteiz, which spans 276.98 km², while Lapuebla de Labarca is the smallest at 6.05 km².

== Municipalities ==
Largest municipalities in Araba/Álava by population

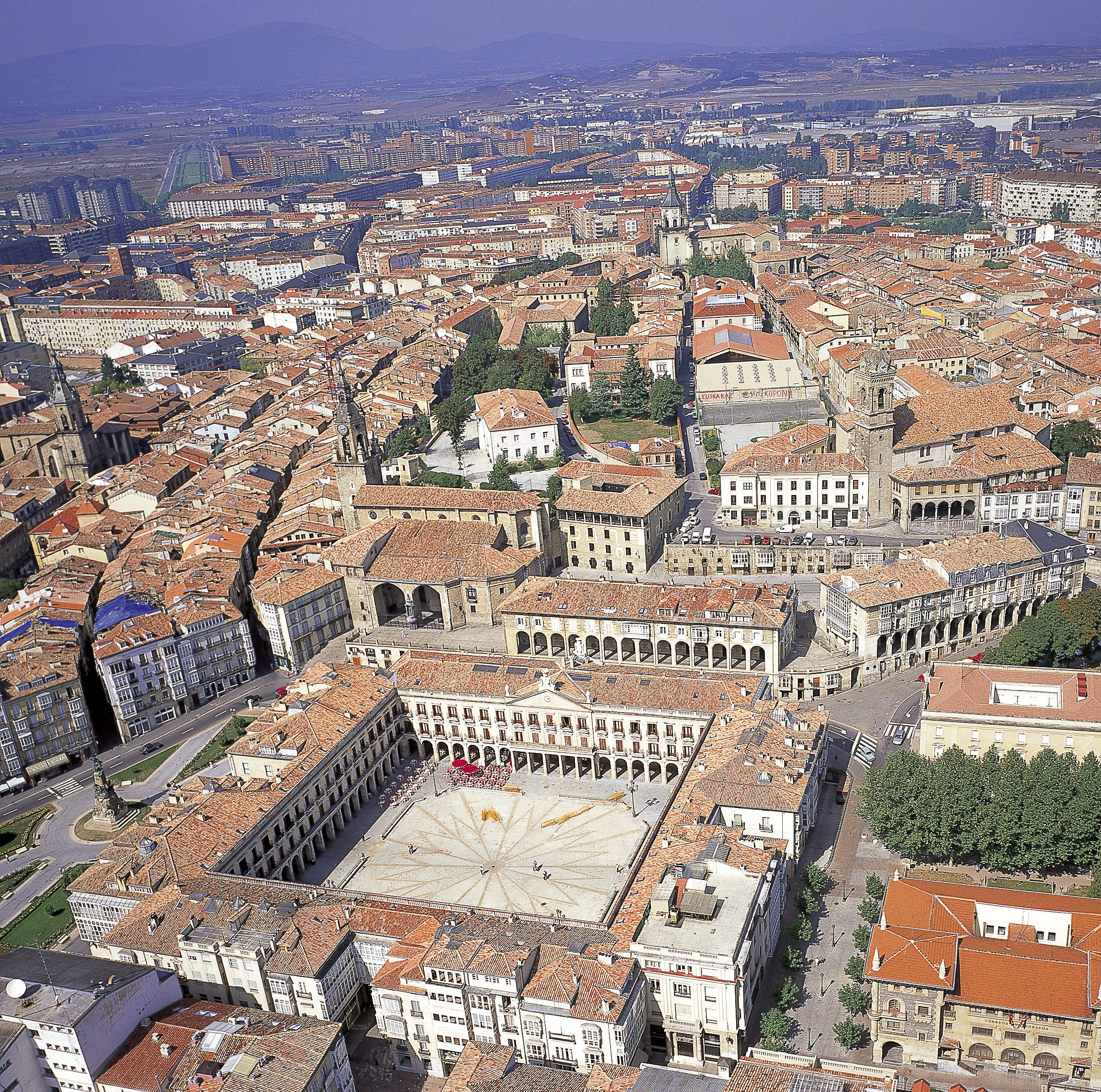
Vitoria-Gasteiz is the province's capital and largest municipality by population.

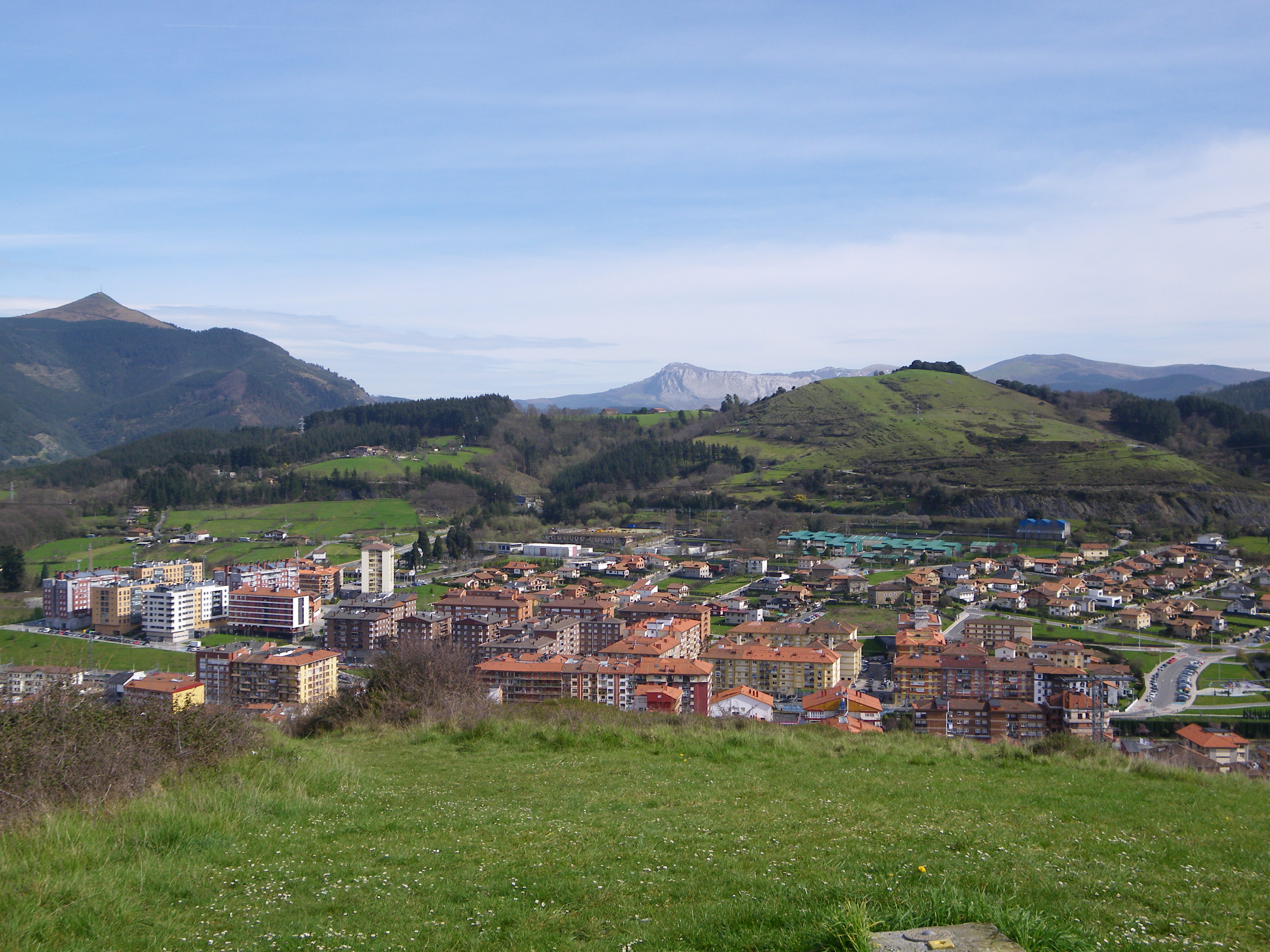
Laudio/Llodio, the second largest municipality by population in Araba/Álava

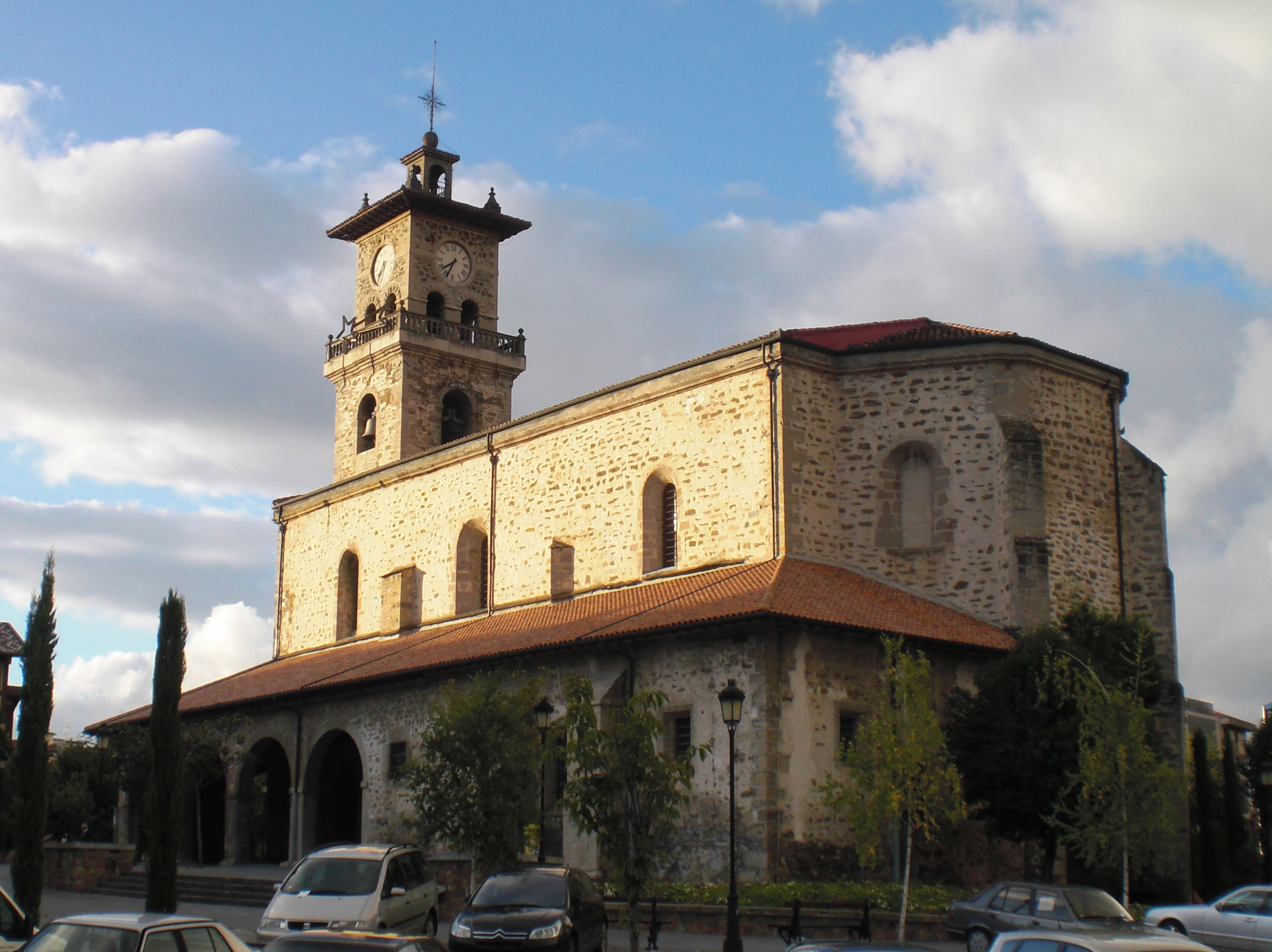
Amurrio is Araba/Álava's third largest municipality by population.

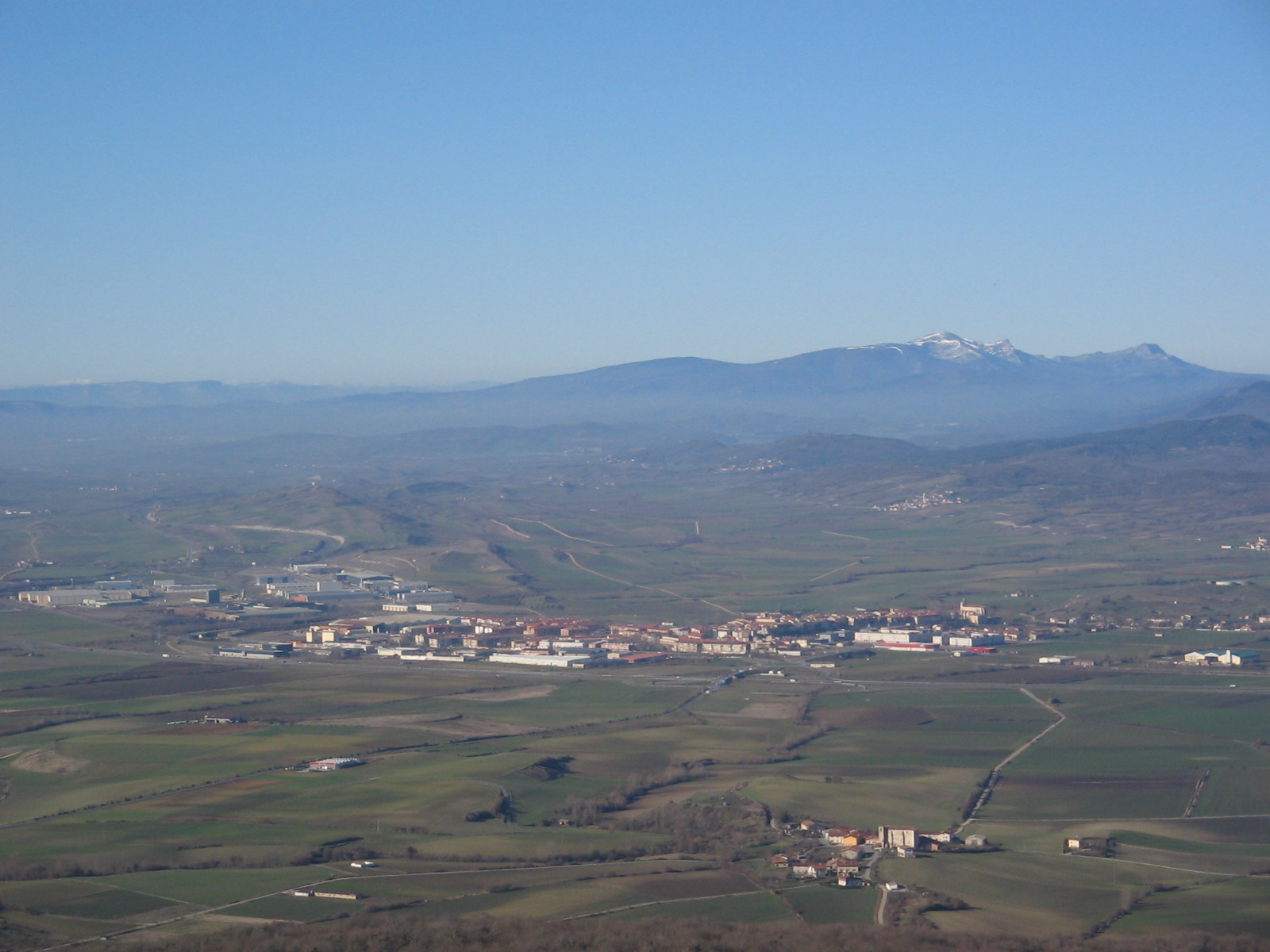
Salvatierra/Agurain, Araba/Álava's fourth largest municipality by population

† Provincial capital

Municipalities in Araba/Álava
| Name | Cuadrilla | Population (2023 census) | Population (2011 census) | Population change | Land area (km²) | Population density (2023) |
|---|---|---|---|---|---|---|
| Alegría-Dulantzi | Llanada Alavesa/Arabako Lautada | 2,969 | 2,860 | +3.8% | 19.95 | 148.8/km^{2} |
| Amurrio | Ayala/Aiara | 10,299 | 10,071 | +2.3% | 96.30 | 106.9/km^{2} |
| Añana | Añana | 156 | 165 | −5.5% | 21.92 | 7.1/km^{2} |
| Aramaio | Gorbeialdea | 1,409 | 1,507 | −6.5% | 73.09 | 19.3/km^{2} |
| Armiñón | Añana | 233 | 227 | +2.6% | 12.97 | 18.0/km^{2} |
| Arraia-Maeztu | Montaña Alavesa/Arabako Mendialdea | 812 | 739 | +9.9% | 123.11 | 6.6/km^{2} |
| Arrazua-Ubarrundia | Gorbeialdea | 1,042 | 953 | +9.3% | 57.53 | 18.1/km^{2} |
| Asparrena | Llanada Alavesa/Arabako Lautada | 1,607 | 1,691 | −5.0% | 65.11 | 24.7/km^{2} |
| Artziniega | Ayala/Aiara | 1,832 | 1,854 | −1.2% | 27.29 | 67.1/km^{2} |
| Ayala/Aiara | Ayala/Aiara | 2,918 | 2,894 | +0.8% | 140.97 | 20.7/km^{2} |
| Baños de Ebro/Mañueta | Laguardia-Rioja Alavesa/Biasteri Arabako Errioxa | 298 | 314 | −5.1% | 9.50 | 31.4/km^{2} |
| Barrundia | Llanada Alavesa/Arabako Lautada | 895 | 904 | −1.0% | 97.30 | 9.2/km^{2} |
| Berantevilla | Añana | 458 | 480 | −4.6% | 35.75 | 12.8/km^{2} |
| Bernedo | Montaña Alavesa/Arabako Mendialdea | 539 | 572 | −5.8% | 130.48 | 4.1/km^{2} |
| Campezo/Kanpezu | Montaña Alavesa/Arabako Mendialdea | 1,079 | 1,146 | −5.8% | 85.36 | 12.6/km^{2} |
| Elburgo/Burgelu | Llanada Alavesa/Arabako Lautada | 637 | 624 | +2.1% | 32.10 | 19.8/km^{2} |
| Elciego | Laguardia-Rioja Alavesa/Biasteri Arabako Errioxa | 968 | 1,048 | −7.6% | 16.26 | 59.5/km^{2} |
| Elvillar/Bilar | Laguardia-Rioja Alavesa/Biasteri Arabako Errioxa | 314 | 363 | −13.5% | 17.50 | 17.9/km^{2} |
| Harana/Valle de Arana | Montaña Alavesa/Arabako Mendialdea | 218 | 283 | −23.0% | 39.12 | 5.6/km^{2} |
| Iruña Oka/Iruña de Oca | Añana | 3,600 | 3,043 | +18.3% | 53.24 | 67.6/km^{2} |
| Iruraiz-Gauna | Llanada Alavesa/Arabako Lautada | 540 | 540 | 0.0% | 47.13 | 11.5/km^{2} |
| Kripan | Laguardia-Rioja Alavesa/Biasteri Arabako Errioxa | 176 | 196 | −10.2% | 12.52 | 14.1/km^{2} |
| Kuartango | Añana | 401 | 355 | +13.0% | 84.32 | 4.8/km^{2} |
| Labastida/Bastida | Laguardia-Rioja Alavesa/Biasteri Arabako Errioxa | 1,577 | 1,489 | +5.9% | 38.11 | 41.4/km^{2} |
| Lagrán | Montaña Alavesa/Arabako Mendialdea | 172 | 182 | −5.5% | 45.62 | 3.8/km^{2} |
| Laguardia | Laguardia-Rioja Alavesa/Biasteri Arabako Errioxa | 1,486 | 1,541 | −3.6% | 80.94 | 18.4/km^{2} |
| Lanciego/Lantziego | Laguardia-Rioja Alavesa/Biasteri Arabako Errioxa | 708 | 690 | +2.6% | 24.25 | 29.2/km^{2} |
| Lantarón | Añana | 937 | 909 | +3.1% | 67.45 | 13.9/km^{2} |
| Lapuebla de Labarca | Laguardia-Rioja Alavesa/Biasteri Arabako Errioxa | 869 | 859 | +1.2% | 6.05 | 143.6/km^{2} |
| Laudio/Llodio | Ayala/Aiara | 17,910 | 18,461 | −3.0% | 37.73 | 474.7/km^{2} |
| Legutiano | Gorbeialdea | 2,043 | 1,739 | +17.5% | 45.86 | 44.5/km^{2} |
| Leza | Laguardia-Rioja Alavesa/Biasteri Arabako Errioxa | 220 | 222 | −0.9% | 9.92 | 22.2/km^{2} |
| Moreda de Álava | Laguardia-Rioja Alavesa/Biasteri Arabako Errioxa | 208 | 248 | −16.1% | 8.67 | 24.0/km^{2} |
| Navaridas | Laguardia-Rioja Alavesa/Biasteri Arabako Errioxa | 198 | 223 | −11.2% | 8.92 | 22.2/km^{2} |
| Okondo | Ayala/Aiara | 1,196 | 1,159 | +3.2% | 29.85 | 40.1/km^{2} |
| Oyón-Oion | Laguardia-Rioja Alavesa/Biasteri Arabako Errioxa | 3,462 | 3,283 | +5.5% | 45.18 | 76.6/km^{2} |
| Peñacerrada-Urizaharra | Montaña Alavesa/Arabako Mendialdea | 303 | 278 | +9.0% | 62.15 | 4.9/km^{2} |
| Erriberagoitia/Ribera Alta | Añana | 826 | 787 | +5.0% | 119.82 | 6.9/km^{2} |
| Ribera Baja/Erribera Beitia | Añana | 1,430 | 1,311 | +9.1% | 25.31 | 56.5/km^{2} |
| Salvatierra/Agurain | Llanada Alavesa/Arabako Lautada | 5,078 | 4,937 | +2.9% | 37.77 | 134.4/km^{2} |
| Samaniego | Laguardia-Rioja Alavesa/Biasteri Arabako Errioxa | 305 | 334 | −8.7% | 10.58 | 28.8/km^{2} |
| San Millán/Donemiliaga | Llanada Alavesa/Arabako Lautada | 730 | 720 | +1.4% | 85.39 | 8.5/km^{2} |
| Urkabustaiz | Gorbeialdea | 1,434 | 1,355 | +5.8% | 60.85 | 23.6/km^{2} |
| Valdegovía/Gaubea | Añana | 1,064 | 1,079 | −1.4% | 238.23 | 4.5/km^{2} |
| Villabuena de Álava/Eskuernaga | Laguardia-Rioja Alavesa/Biasteri Arabako Errioxa | 284 | 330 | −13.9% | 8.48 | 33.5/km^{2} |
| Vitoria-Gasteiz† | Vitoria-Gasteiz | 255,423 | 240,753 | +6.1% | 276.98 | 922.2/km^{2} |
| Yécora/Iekora | Laguardia-Rioja Alavesa/Biasteri Arabako Errioxa | 250 | 286 | −12.6% | 18.80 | 13.3/km^{2} |
| Zalduondo | Llanada Alavesa/Arabako Lautada | 196 | 185 | +5.9% | 11.89 | 16.5/km^{2} |
| Zambrana | Añana | 423 | 434 | −2.5% | 39.57 | 10.7/km^{2} |
| Zigoitia | Gorbeialdea | 1,819 | 1,740 | +4.5% | 102.09 | 17.8/km^{2} |
| Zuia | Gorbeialdea | 2,357 | 2,420 | −2.6% | 122.58 | 19.2/km^{2} |
| Araba/Álava | — | 336,308 | 320,778 | +4.8% | 2,967.86 | 113.3/km^{2} |
| Basque Country | — | 2,216,302 | 2,185,393 | +1.4% | 7,092.45 | 312.5/km^{2} |
| Spain | — | 48,085,361 | 46,815,916 | +2.7% | 504,755.17 | 95.3/km^{2} |

== See also ==
- Geography of Spain
- List of municipalities of Spain
