= Antezana de la Ribera =

Village in Basque Country, Spain

Coordinates: 42°46′N 2°53′W

- Village
- Nickname: Antezana
- Interactive map of Antezana de la Ribera
- Country: Spain
- Autonomous community: Basque Country
- Province: Araba
- Eskualdea: Añanako
- Municipality: Erriberagoitia

Antezana de la Ribera is a village in the municipality of Erriberagoitia (Spanish: Ribera Alta) in Álava, Basque Country, Spain.

== Location and access ==
Antezana de la Ribera is located on the eastern slope of Montemayor, 29 kilometers from Vitoria on the A-3310 between Manzanos and Pobes.

== Population ==
Antezana de la Ribera consists of 11 inhabitants who live continuously and another six that visit on weekends. Its main activity is agriculture (5 farmers), others work in industries in Vitoria and Miranda de Ebro and the rest are retired.

== Geography ==
The large hill that forms most of Antezana de la Ribera's jurisdiction of 575 hectares consists of pines and holm oaks dotted with oak trees.

== Monuments ==
Antezana de la Ribera has a well-preserved church dedicated to Our Lady of the Assumption whose feast is celebrated on August 15. The altar is flanked by some newly restored paintings. The entrance to the San Andrés chapel is guarded by an elegant gate dating from 1576. There is also a confessional. The pilgrimage to the shrine of Our Lady of Joy is celebrated in May and September. The shrine is located in the upper part of the town from where the views of the valley are splendid. Up to ten other villages belonging to the municipality and the County of Treviño can be seen.
