= Barrón =

Hamlet in Álava, Spain

- Concejo
- Location within Álava Location within the Basque Country Location within Spain
- Coordinates: 42°50′44″N 2°59′29″W
- Country: Spain
- Autonomous community: Basque Country
- Province: Álava
- Comarca: Añana
- Municipality: Ribera Alta/Erriberagoitia

Area
  - Total: 6.23 km^{2} (2.41 sq mi)
- Elevation: 674 m (2,211 ft)

Population (2023)
  - Total: 19
  - Density: 3.0/km^{2} (7.9/sq mi)
- Postal code: 01428

Barrón is a hamlet and concejo in the municipality of Ribera Alta/Erriberagoitia, in Álava province, Basque Country, Spain.

== Geography ==
Barrón is located at 674 metres (2,211 ft) above sea level, on the slopes of the Arcamo range. It is surrounded by evergreen oak and pine forests and cultivated fields. Barrón formerly belonged to the hermandad and municipality of Lacozmonte.

== Landmarks ==
The most notable buildings in Barrón are the house-tower of the Barrón y Mendoza family (a Gothic building from the 14th century) and the lobera of Barrón (a moat-like structure with convergent walls that was once used to hunt wolves).
