= Atiega =

Hamlet in Álava, Spain

Atiega/Atiaga
- Concejo
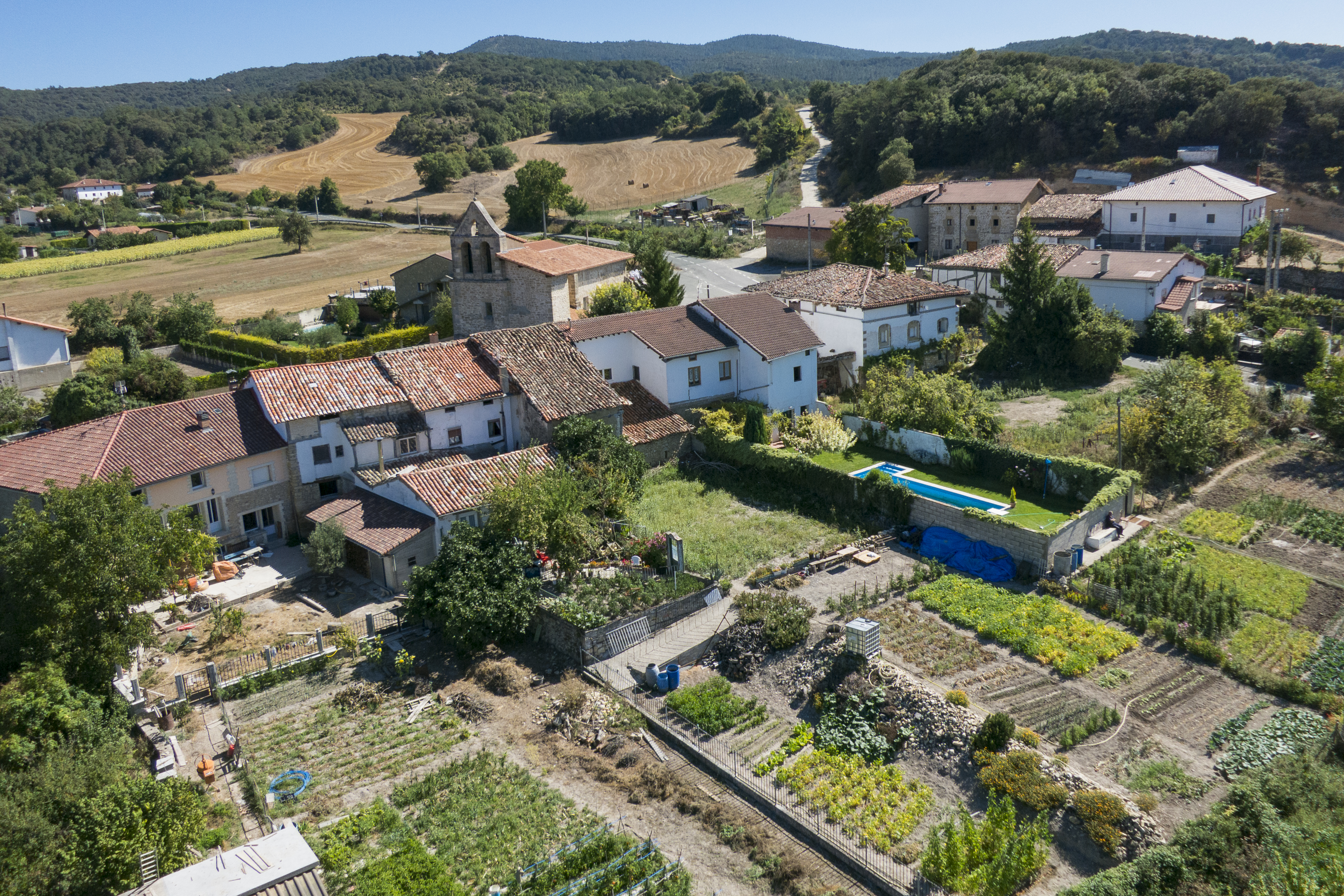

- Location within Álava Location within the Basque Country Location within Spain
- Coordinates: 42°49′34″N 2°59′51″W
- Country: Spain
- Autonomous community: Basque Country
- Province: Álava
- Comarca: Añana
- Municipality: Añana
- Elevation: 576 m (1,890 ft)

Population (2023)
  - Total: 16
- Postal code: 01423

Atiega (Spanish pronunciation: [atjega]) or Atiaga (Basque pronunciation: [ati.aga]) is a hamlet and concejo in the municipality of Añana, in Álava province, Basque Country, Spain. It has been linked to Salinas de Añana since 1194, when Alfonso VIII of Castile granted the area to Salinas.
