= Ocio, Álava =

Hamlet in Álava, Spain

Ocio
- Concejo
- Location within Álava Location within the Basque Country Location within Spain
- Coordinates: 42°39′23″N 2°49′20″W
- Country: Spain
- Autonomous community: Basque Country
- Province: Álava
- Comarca: Añana
- Municipality: Zambrana

Area
  - Total: 12.40 km^{2} (4.79 sq mi)
- Elevation: 521 m (1,709 ft)

Population (2023)
  - Total: 35
  - Density: 2.8/km^{2} (7.3/sq mi)
- Postal code: 01212

Ocio (Basque: Ozio) is a hamlet and concejo in the municipality of Zambrana, Álava province, Basque Country, Spain. Formerly an independent municipality, it was absorbed by Berganzo in 1919. In turn, Berganzo was merged into Zambrana in 1925.

Ocio is located on the banks of the Inglares river, a tributary of the Ebro. It is bounded by the Toloño Range on the south and the Sierra de Portilla on the north.
