= Berganzo =

Hamlet in Álava, Spain

- Concejo
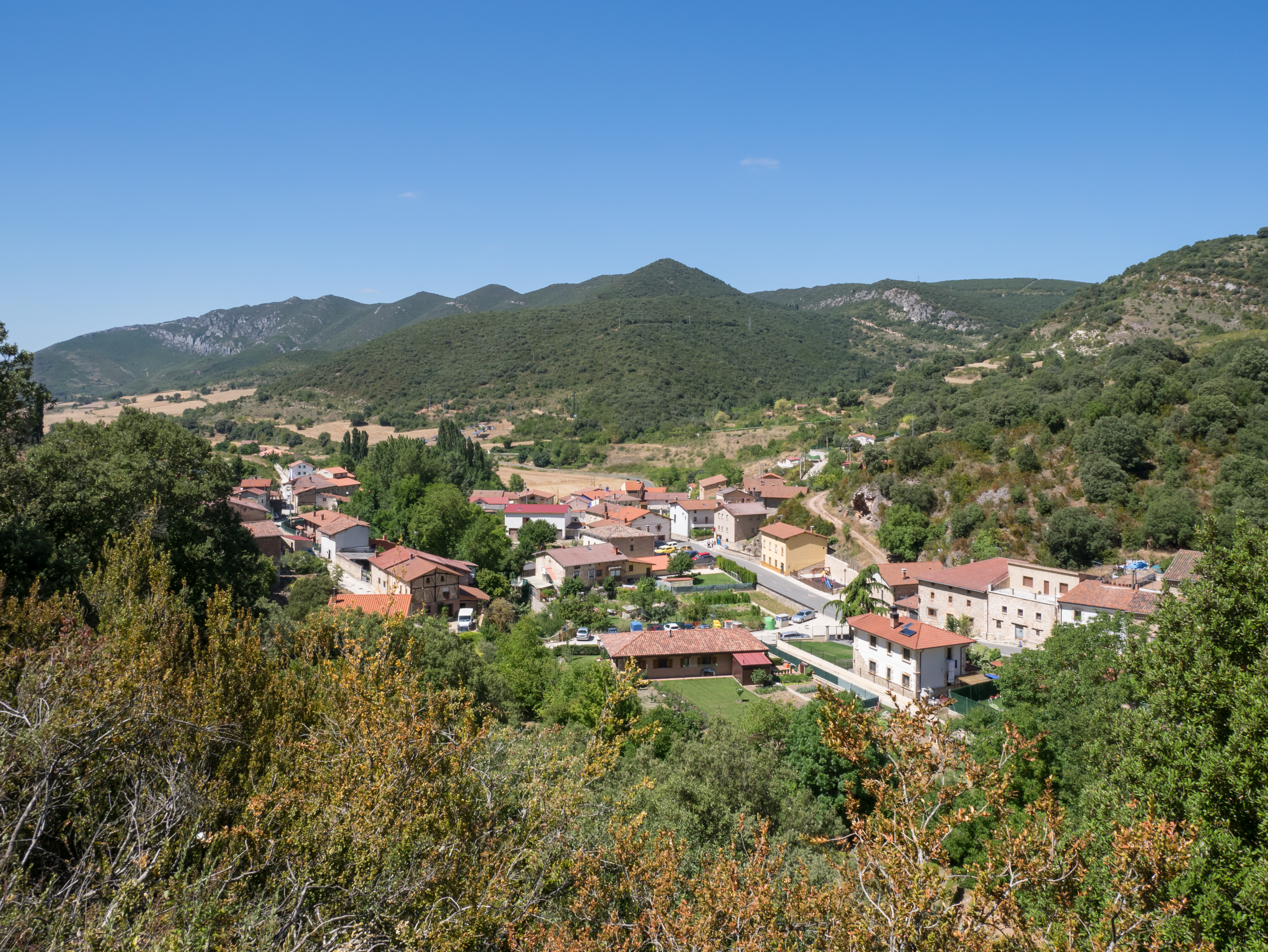
- View of Berganzo

- Location within Álava Location within the Basque Country Location within Spain
- Coordinates: 42°39′00″N 2°47′04″W
- Country: Spain
- Autonomous community: Basque Country
- Province: Álava
- Comarca: Añana
- Municipality: Zambrana

Area
  - Total: 13.72 km^{2} (5.30 sq mi)
- Elevation: 578 m (1,896 ft)

Population (2023)
  - Total: 40
  - Density: 2.9/km^{2} (7.6/sq mi)
- Postal code: 01212

Berganzo (Basque: Bergantzu) is a hamlet and concejo in the municipality of Zambrana, Álava province, Basque Country, Spain. Formerly an independent municipality, it absorbed the hamlet of Ocio in 1919. In turn, Berganzo was merged into Zambrana in 1925.
