= Subijana-Morillas =

Hamlet in Álava, Spain

- Concejo
- Location within Álava Location within the Basque Country Location within Spain
- Coordinates: 42°49′25″N 2°53′45″W
- Country: Spain
- Autonomous community: Basque Country
- Province: Álava
- Comarca: Añana
- Municipality: Ribera Alta/Erriberagoitia

Area
  - Total: 6.47 km^{2} (2.50 sq mi)
- Elevation: 537 m (1,762 ft)

Population (2023)
  - Total: 77
  - Density: 12/km^{2} (31/sq mi)
- Postal code: 01428

Subijana-Morillas (Basque: Subilla Morillas) is a hamlet and concejo in the municipality of Ribera Alta/Erriberagoitia, in Álava province, Basque Country, Spain. It is located on the left bank of the Bayas, which separates it from Morillas.
