= Villaluenga =

Hamlet in Álava, Spain

- Concejo
- Location within Álava Location within the Basque Country Location within Spain
- Coordinates: 42°47′N 2°52′W
- Country: Spain
- Autonomous community: Basque Country
- Province: Álava
- Comarca: Añana
- Municipality: Ribera Alta/Erriberagoitia

Area
  - Total: 2.86 km^{2} (1.10 sq mi)
- Elevation: 621 m (2,037 ft)

Population (2023)
  - Total: 21
  - Density: 7.3/km^{2} (19/sq mi)
- Postal code: 01428

Villaluenga is a hamlet and concejo in the municipality of Ribera Alta/Erriberagoitia, in Álava province, Basque Country, Spain.
