= Leciñana de la Oca =

Hamlet in Álava, Spain

- Concejo
- Location within Álava Location within the Basque Country Location within Spain
- Coordinates: 42°45′33″N 2°51′47″W
- Country: Spain
- Autonomous community: Basque Country
- Province: Álava
- Comarca: Añana
- Municipality: Ribera Alta/Erriberagoitia

Area
  - Total: 3.34 km^{2} (1.29 sq mi)
- Elevation: 528 m (1,732 ft)

Population (2023)
  - Total: 12
  - Density: 3.6/km^{2} (9.3/sq mi)
- Postal code: 01220

Leciñana de la Oca (Basque: Leciñana Oka) is a hamlet and concejo in the municipality of Ribera Alta/Erriberagoitia, in Álava province, Basque Country, Spain.
