= Villambrosa =

Hamlet in Álava, Spain

- Concejo
- Location within Álava Location within the Basque Country Location within Spain
- Coordinates: 42°46′51″N 3°00′19″W
- Country: Spain
- Autonomous community: Basque Country
- Province: Álava
- Comarca: Añana
- Municipality: Ribera Alta/Erriberagoitia

Area
  - Total: 3.99 km^{2} (1.54 sq mi)
- Elevation: 750 m (2,460 ft)

Population (2023)
  - Total: 11
  - Density: 2.8/km^{2} (7.1/sq mi)
- Postal code: 01423

Villambrosa is a hamlet and concejo in the municipality of Ribera Alta/Erriberagoitia, in Álava province, Basque Country, Spain.
