= Villabezana =

Hamlet in Álava, Spain

- Concejo
- Location within Álava Location within the Basque Country Location within Spain
- Coordinates: 42°44′22″N 2°56′34″W
- Country: Spain
- Autonomous community: Basque Country
- Province: Álava
- Comarca: Añana
- Municipality: Ribera Alta/Erriberagoitia

Area
  - Total: 6.79 km^{2} (2.62 sq mi)
- Elevation: 609 m (1,998 ft)

Population (2023)
  - Total: 34
  - Density: 5.0/km^{2} (13/sq mi)
- Postal code: 01213

Villabezana is a hamlet and concejo in the municipality of Ribera Alta/Erriberagoitia, in Álava province, Basque Country, Spain.
