= Caicedo-Sopeña =

Hamlet in Álava, Spain

- Concejo
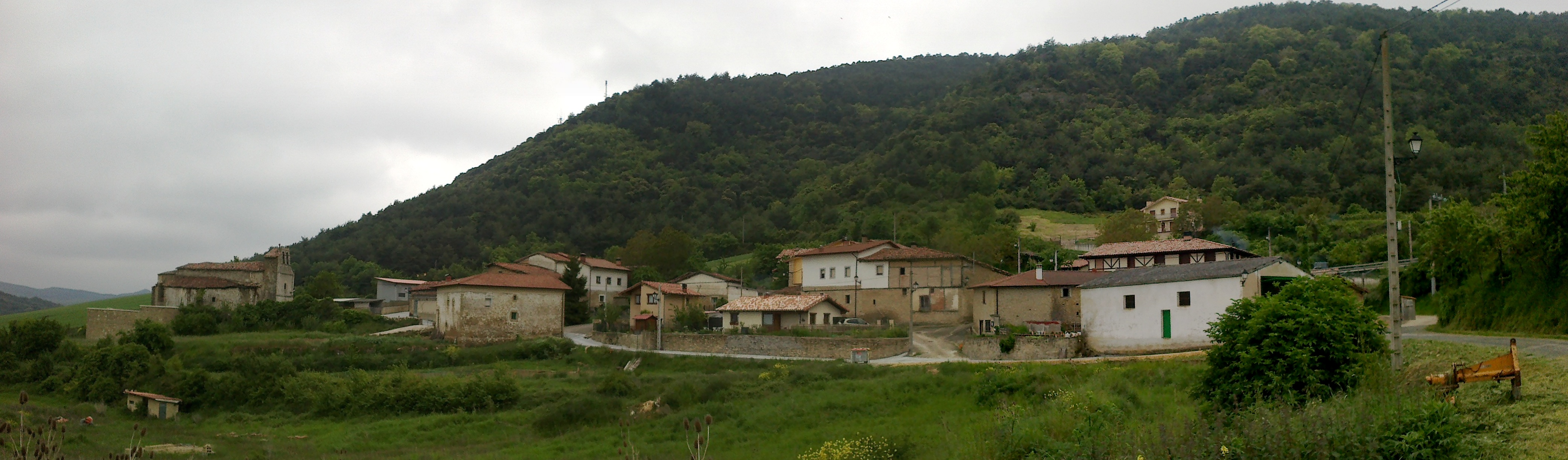
- View of Caicedo-Sopeña

- Location within Álava Location within the Basque Country Location within Spain
- Coordinates: 42°47′04″N 2°55′05″W
- Country: Spain
- Autonomous community: Basque Country
- Province: Álava
- Comarca: Añana
- Municipality: Ribera Alta/Erriberagoitia

Area
  - Total: 3.54 km^{2} (1.37 sq mi)
- Elevation: 610 m (2,000 ft)

Population (2023)
  - Total: 24
  - Density: 6.8/km^{2} (18/sq mi)
- Postal code: 01420

Caicedo-Sopeña (Basque: Caicedo Sopeña) is a hamlet and concejo in the municipality of Ribera Alta/Erriberagoitia, in Álava province, Basque Country, Spain.
