= Pinto bean =

Variety of the common bean (Phaseolus vulgaris)

Beans, pinto, mature seeds, cooked, boiled, without salt
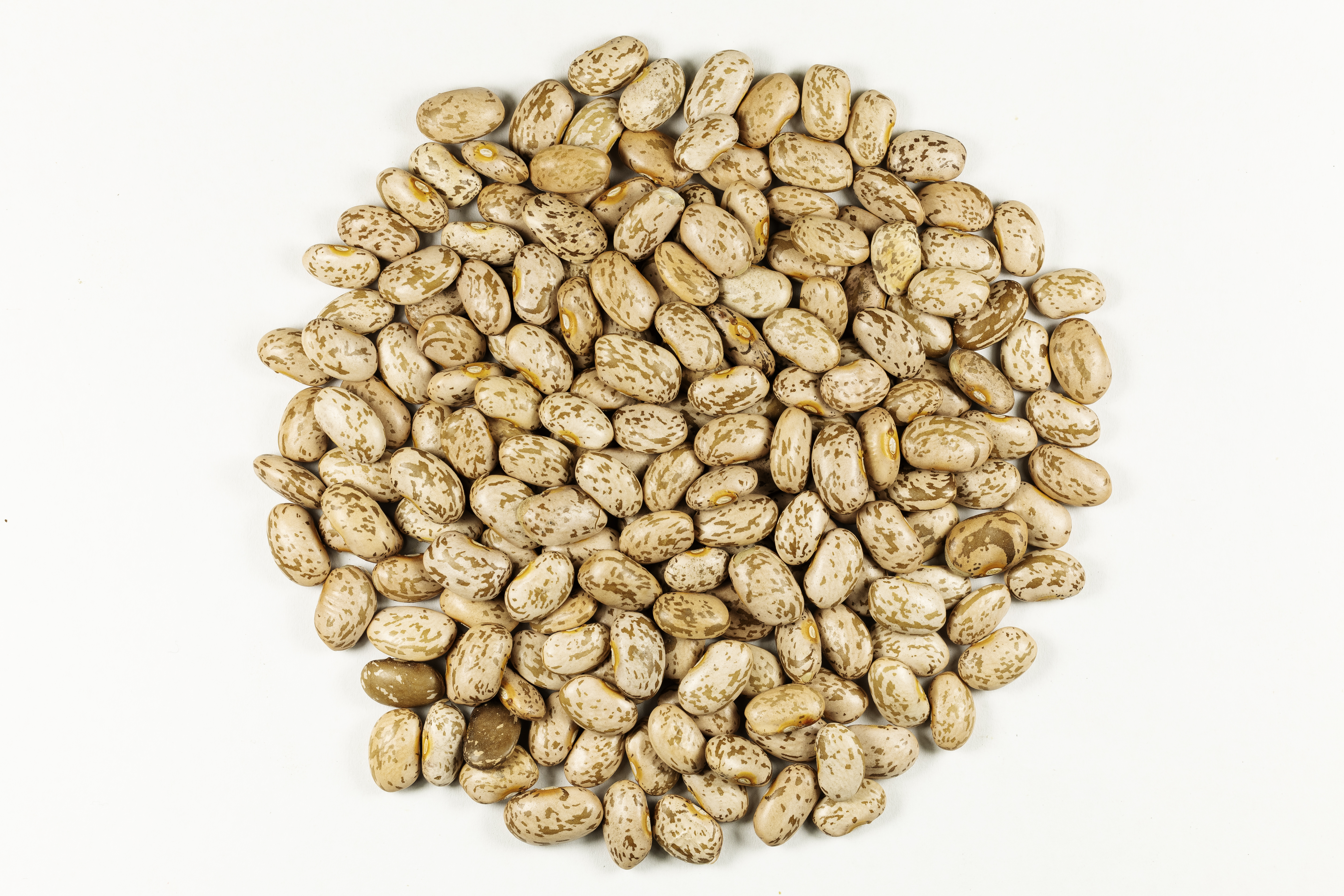

Nutritional value per 100 g
- Energy: 598 kJ (143 kcal)
- Carbohydrates: 26.22
- Sugars: 0.34
- Dietary fiber: 9.0
- Fat: 0.65
- Saturated: 0.109
- Monounsaturated: 0.106
- Polyunsaturated: 0.188
- Protein: 9.01
Vitamins and minerals
Vitamins	Quantity %DV^{†}
Vitamin A equiv.	0% 0 μg
Vitamin A	0 IU
Thiamine (B1)	16% 0.193 mg
Riboflavin (B2)	5% 0.062 mg
Niacin (B3)	2% 0.318 mg
Vitamin B6	13% 0.229 mg
Folate (B9)	43% 172 μg
Vitamin C	1% 0.8 mg
Vitamin D	0% 0 μg
Vitamin D	0% 0 IU
Vitamin E	6% 0.94 mg
Vitamin K	3% 3.5 μg
Minerals	Quantity %DV^{†}
Calcium	4% 46 mg
Iron	12% 2.09 mg
Magnesium	12% 50 mg
Manganese	20% 0.453 mg
Phosphorus	12% 147 mg
Potassium	15% 436 mg
Zinc	9% 0.98 mg
- Other constituents: Quantity
- Water: 62.95 g
- ^{†}Percentages estimated using US recommendations for adults, except for potassium, which is estimated based on expert recommendation from the National Academies.

The pinto bean (/ˈpɪntoʊ/) is a variety of common bean (Phaseolus vulgaris). In Spanish they are called frijoles pintos. It is the most popular bean by crop production in Northern Mexico and the Southwestern United States, and is usually eaten whole (sometimes in broth), or mashed and then fried. Prepared either way, it is a common filling for burritos, tostadas, or tacos in Mexican cuisine, also as a side or as part of an entrée served with a side tortilla or sopapilla in New Mexican cuisine.

In South America, it is known as the poroto frutilla, literally "strawberry bean". In Portuguese, the Brazilian name is feijão carioca (literally "carioca bean"; contrary to popular belief, the beans were not named after Rio de Janeiro, but after a pig breed that has the same color as the legume), which differs from the name in Portugal: feijão catarino. Additionally, the young immature pods may be harvested and cooked as green pinto beans. There are a number of different varieties of pinto bean, notably some originating from Northern Spain, where an annual fair is dedicated to the bean.

In many languages, "pinto" means "colored" or "painted", as derived from the Late Latin pinctus and Classical Latin pictus. In Spanish, it means "painted", "dappled", or "spotted". The coloration of pinto beans is similar to that of pinto horses.

== Use ==
The dried pinto bean is used in many dishes, especially refried beans. It is popular in chili con carne, although kidney beans, black beans, and many others may be used in other locales. Pinto beans are often found in Brazilian cuisine. Legumes, mainly the common bean, are a staple food everywhere in the country, cultivated since 3000 BCE, along with starch-rich foods, such as rice, manioc, pasta, and other wheat-based products, polenta and other corn-based products, potatoes and yams. Pinto beans are also a very important ingredient in Spanish cuisine and Mexican cuisine. In Spanish cuisine pinto beans are mostly used in a dish named after them. In the Southern United States, pinto beans are commonly a staple, especially during the winter months. Some organizations and churches in rural areas sponsor "pinto bean suppers" for social gatherings and fund raisers.

== Varieties ==
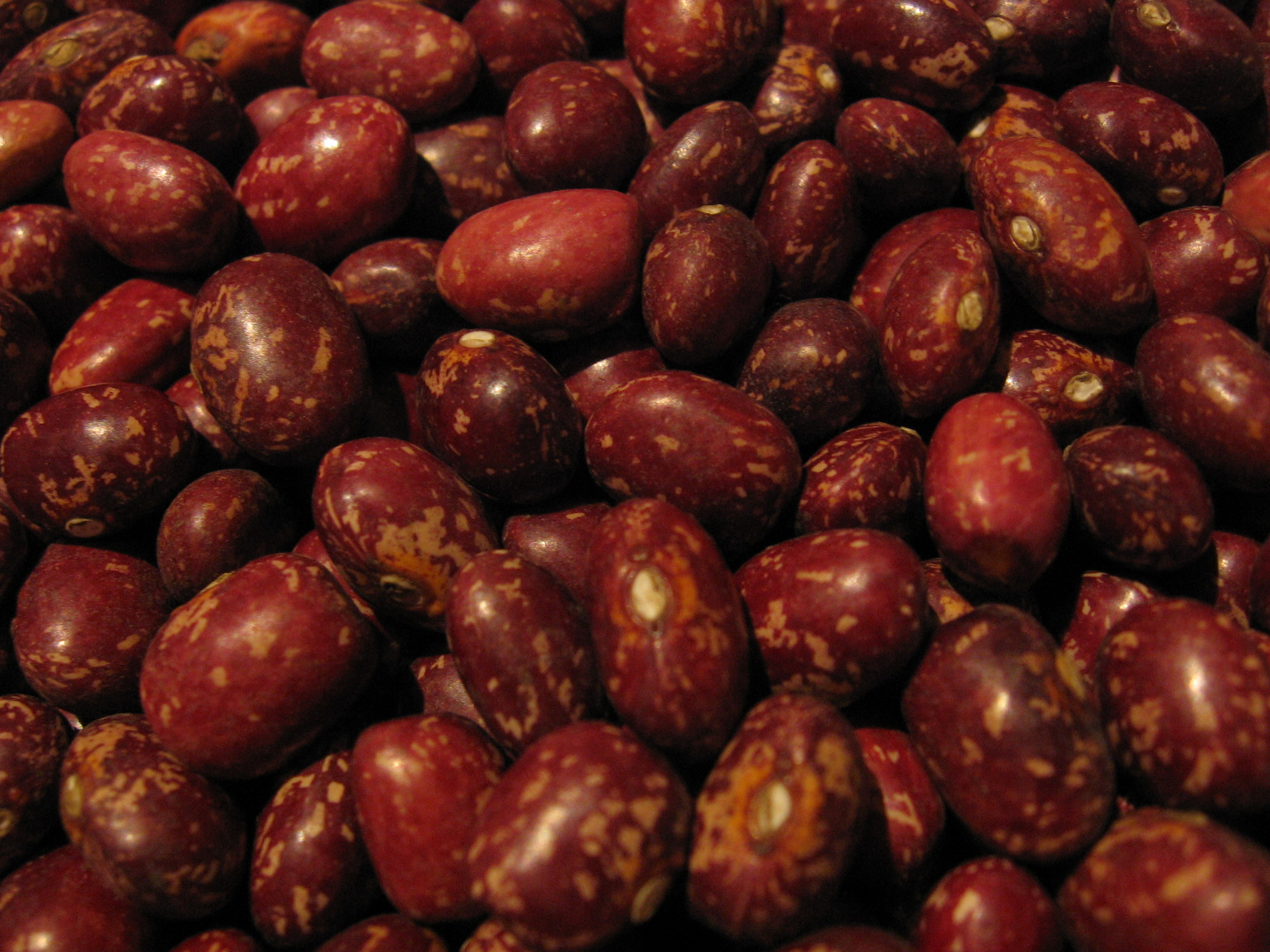
Alubia pinta alavesa, a red pinto bean variety developed in Añana, Spain

Pinto bean varieties include: 'Burke', 'Hidatsa', and 'Othello'.

The alubia pinta alavesa, or the "Alavese pinto bean", a red variety of the pinto bean, originated in Añana, a town and municipality located in the province of Álava, in the Basque Country of northern Spain. In October, the Feria de la alubia pinta alavesa (Alavese pinto bean fair) is celebrated in Pobes.

== Cooking ==
Pinto beans are often soaked, which greatly shortens cooking time. If unsoaked, they are frequently boiled rapidly for 10 minutes. They will then generally take two to three hours to cook on a stove to soften. In a pressure cooker they will cook very rapidly, perhaps 3 minutes if soaked, and 20–45 minutes if unsoaked. Cooking times vary considerably however and may depend on the source of the bean, hardness of the cooking water and many other factors.

== Nutrition ==
A nutrient-dense legume, the pinto bean contains many essential nutrients. It is a good source of protein, phosphorus and manganese, and very high in dietary fiber and folate.

Rice and pinto beans served with cornbread or maize tortillas are often a staple meal where meat is unavailable. This combination contains the essential amino acids necessary for humans in adequate amounts: maize complements beans' relative scarcity of methionine and cystine and beans complement maize's relative scarcity of lysine and tryptophan.

Studies have indicated pinto beans can lower the levels of both HDL and LDL cholesterol.

== See also ==
- Gallo pinto
- Bolita bean
