= Lasierra =

Hamlet in Álava, Spain

- Concejo
- Location within Álava Location within the Basque Country Location within Spain
- Coordinates: 42°47′48″N 2°52′31″W
- Country: Spain
- Autonomous community: Basque Country
- Province: Álava
- Comarca: Añana
- Municipality: Ribera Alta/Erriberagoitia

Area
  - Total: 2.31 km^{2} (0.89 sq mi)
- Elevation: 649 m (2,129 ft)

Population (2023)
  - Total: 16
  - Density: 6.9/km^{2} (18/sq mi)
- Postal code: 01428

Lasierra is a hamlet and concejo in the municipality of Ribera Alta/Erriberagoitia, in Álava province, Basque Country, Spain.
