= Artaza-Escota =

Concejo in Álava, Spain

Artaza-Escota/Artatza-Axkoeta
- Concejo
- Location within Álava Location within the Basque Country Location within Spain
- Coordinates: 42°50′57″N 2°58′05″W
- Country: Spain
- Autonomous community: Basque Country
- Province: Álava
- Comarca: Añana
- Municipality: Ribera Alta/Erriberagoitia

Area
  - Total: 10.20 km^{2} (3.94 sq mi)

Population (2023)
  - Total: 32
  - Density: 3.1/km^{2} (8.1/sq mi)
- Postal code: 01428

Artaza-Escota (Spanish pronunciation: [aɾˈtaθa esˈkota]) or Artatza-Axkoeta (Basque pronunciation: [artats̻a aʃkoeta]) is a concejo in the municipality of Ribera Alta/Erriberagoitia, in Álava province, Basque Country, Spain. It is formed by the hamlets of Artaza/Artatza and Escota/Axkoeta.
