= Ormijana =

Hamlet in Álava, Spain

- Concejo
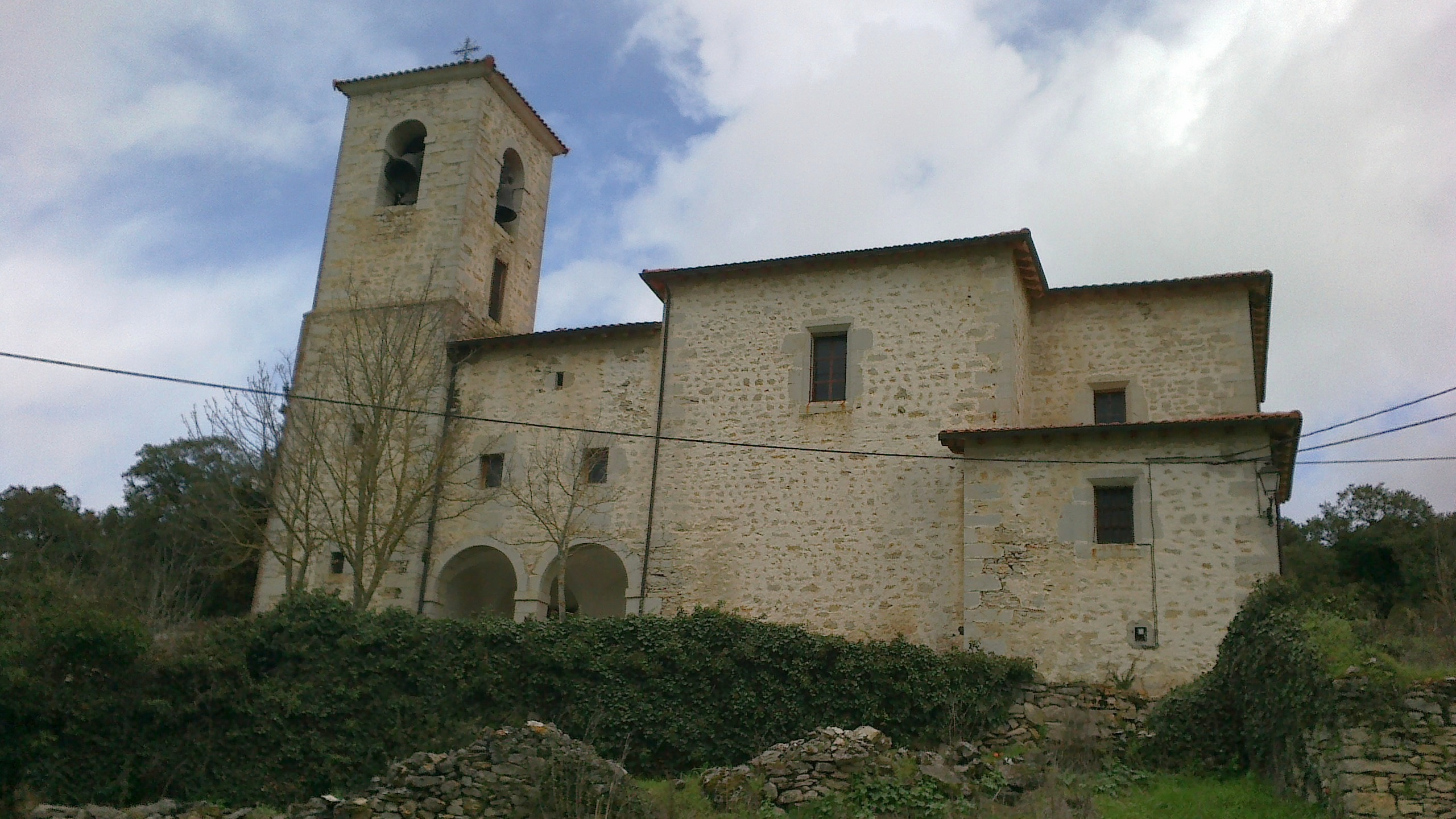
- The church of Ormijana

- Location within Álava Location within the Basque Country Location within Spain
- Coordinates: 42°50′03″N 2°55′56″W
- Country: Spain
- Autonomous community: Basque Country
- Province: Álava
- Comarca: Añana
- Municipality: Ribera Alta/Erriberagoitia

Area
  - Total: 7.55 km^{2} (2.92 sq mi)
- Elevation: 619 m (2,031 ft)

Population (2023)
  - Total: 38
  - Density: 5.0/km^{2} (13/sq mi)
- Postal code: 01428

Ormijana is a hamlet and concejo in the municipality of Ribera Alta/Erriberagoitia, in Álava province, Basque Country, Spain.
