= Viloria, Álava =

Hamlet in Álava, Spain

Viloria
- Concejo
- Location within Álava Location within the Basque Country Location within Spain
- Coordinates: 42°47′34″N 2°58′07″W
- Country: Spain
- Autonomous community: Basque Country
- Province: Álava
- Comarca: Añana
- Municipality: Ribera Alta/Erriberagoitia

Area
  - Total: 3.57 km^{2} (1.38 sq mi)
- Elevation: 733 m (2,405 ft)

Population (2023)
  - Total: 23
  - Density: 6.4/km^{2} (17/sq mi)
- Postal code: 01426

Viloria (alternatively in Basque: Biloria) is a hamlet and concejo in the municipality of Ribera Alta/Erriberagoitia, in Álava province, Basque Country, Spain.
