= Arreo =

Hamlet in Álava, Spain

- Concejo
- Location within Álava Location within the Basque Country Location within Spain
- Coordinates: 42°47′04″N 2°58′09″W
- Country: Spain
- Autonomous community: Basque Country
- Province: Álava
- Comarca: Añana
- Municipality: Ribera Alta/Erriberagoitia

Area
  - Total: 2.84 km^{2} (1.10 sq mi)
- Elevation: 752 m (2,467 ft)

Population (2023)
  - Total: 6
  - Density: 2.1/km^{2} (5.5/sq mi)
- Postal code: 01426

Arreo is a hamlet and concejo in the municipality of Ribera Alta/Erriberagoitia, in Álava province, Basque Country, Spain. It gives its name to the only natural lake in the Basque Country.
