= Basquiñuelas =

Hamlet in Álava, Spain

- Concejo
- Location within Álava Location within the Basque Country Location within Spain
- Coordinates: 42°48′44″N 2°57′39″W
- Country: Spain
- Autonomous community: Basque Country
- Province: Álava
- Comarca: Añana
- Municipality: Ribera Alta/Erriberagoitia

Area
  - Total: 4.98 km^{2} (1.92 sq mi)
- Elevation: 680 m (2,230 ft)

Population (2023)
  - Total: 5
  - Density: 1.0/km^{2} (2.6/sq mi)
- Postal code: 01420

Basquiñuelas is a hamlet and concejo in the municipality of Ribera Alta/Erriberagoitia, in Álava province, Basque Country, Spain.
