= Paúl, Álava =

Hamlet in Álava, Spain

Paúl
- Concejo
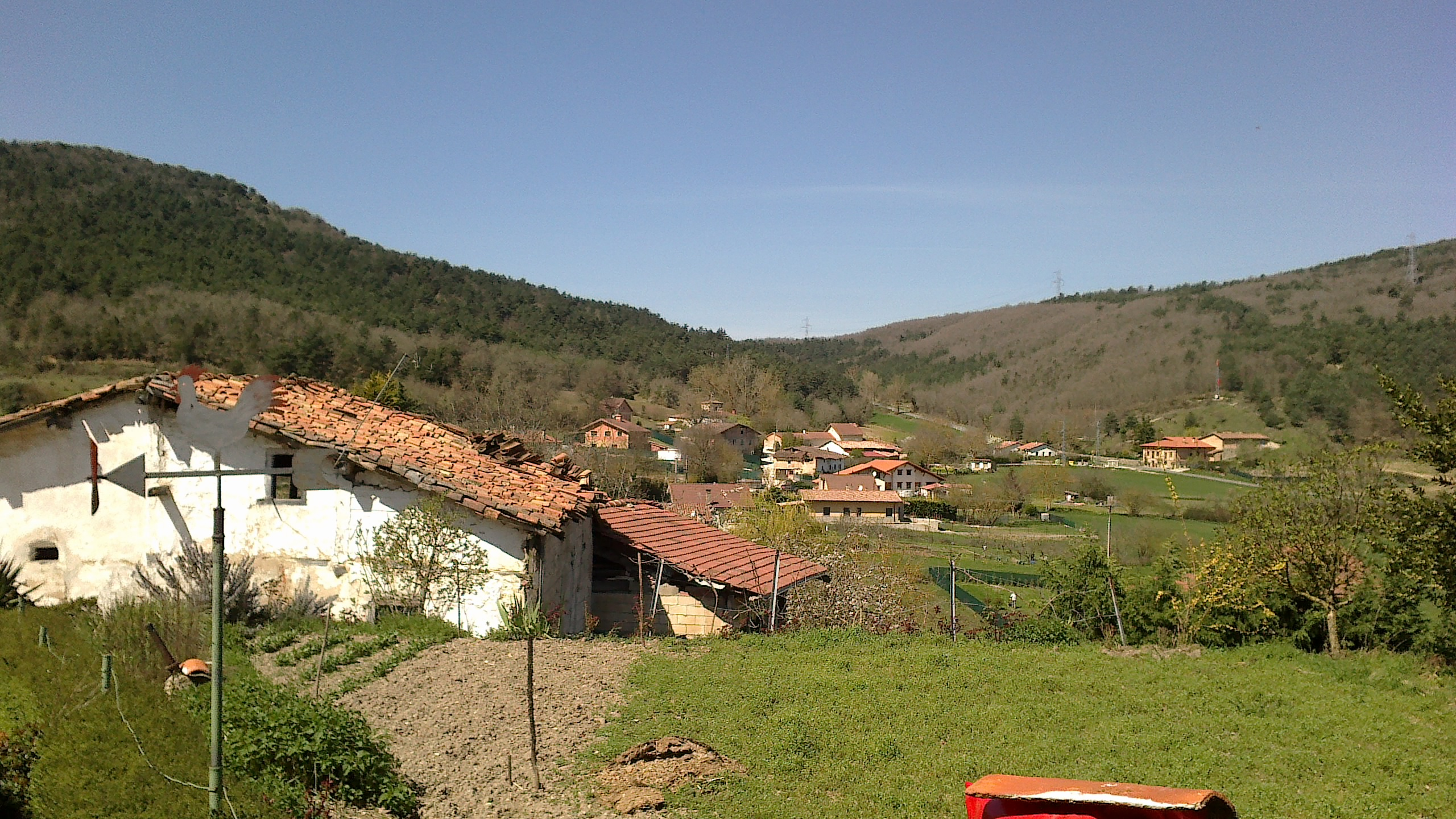
- View of Paúl

- Location within Álava Location within the Basque Country Location within Spain
- Coordinates: 42.792°N 2.942°W
- Country: Spain
- Autonomous community: Basque Country
- Province: Álava
- Comarca: Añana
- Municipality: Ribera Alta/Erriberagoitia

Area
  - Total: 2.90 km^{2} (1.12 sq mi)
- Elevation: 662 m (2,172 ft)

Population (2022)
  - Total: 51
  - Density: 18/km^{2} (46/sq mi)
- Postal code: 01420

Paúl (sometimes in Basque: Padul) is a hamlet and concejo located in the municipality of Ribera Alta/Erriberagoitia, in Álava province, Basque Country, Spain.
