= Pablo de Porturas y Landázuri =

Spanish Hidalgo accountant and treasurer

Accountant of the Royal Treasury of Trujillo
- In office 4 1795 – 11 1796
- Monarch: Charles IV

Treasurer of the Royal Treasury of Lima
- In office 4 1809 – 12 1817
- Monarch: Fernando VII

Personal details
- Born: July 1748 Subijana-Morillas, Spain
- Died: May 1818 (aged 69) Lima, Viceroyalty of Peru
- Resting place: Angasmarca
- Spouse: Juana Paula del Corral y Aranda (m. 1800; died 1843)
- Parent(s): Juan de Gordóniz Porturas; Josepha Ortiz de Landazuri
- Profession: Accountant, treasurer

Pablo de Porturas y Landázuri was a Spanish Hidalgo accountant and treasurer of the Viceroyalty of Perú administration.

Porturas y Landázuri was born in the town of Subijana-Morillas in the province of Álava, Basque Country in 1748. He was son of Juan de Gordóniz Porturas y Latatu and Josepha Ortiz de Landazuri y Arriaga. He married Juana Paula del Corral y Aranda in 1800 and died in Lima, Viceroyalty of Perú in 1818.

He worked as a visitor of the Arequipa Royal Treasury Office, accountant of the Trujillo Royal Treasury Office, accountant of the Cuzco Royal Treasury Office and treasurer minister of the Lima Royal Treasury Office.
