= Tuyo =

Tuyo may refer to:

- "Tuyo" (Rodrigo Amarante song), 2015
- "Tuyo" (Romeo Santos song), 2017
- Tuyo (album), a 1985 album by Camilo Sesto
- Tuyo, Álava, a hamlet and council in Álava province, Basque Country, Spain
- Tuyô or daing, dried fish from the Philippines
