= Hereña =

Hamlet in Álava, Spain

- Concejo
- Location within Álava Location within the Basque Country Location within Spain
- Coordinates: 42.77694°N 2.90389°W
- Country: Spain
- Autonomous community: Basque Country
- Province: Álava
- Comarca: Añana
- Municipality: Ribera Alta/Erriberagoitia

Area
  - Total: 5.46 km^{2} (2.11 sq mi)
- Elevation: 526 m (1,726 ft)

Population (2022)
  - Total: 35
  - Density: 6.4/km^{2} (17/sq mi)
- Postal code: 01420

Hereña is a hamlet and concejo located in the municipality of Ribera Alta/Erriberagoitia, in Álava province, Basque Country, Spain.
