= Tuyo, Álava =

Hamlet in Álava, Spain

Tuyo
- Concejo
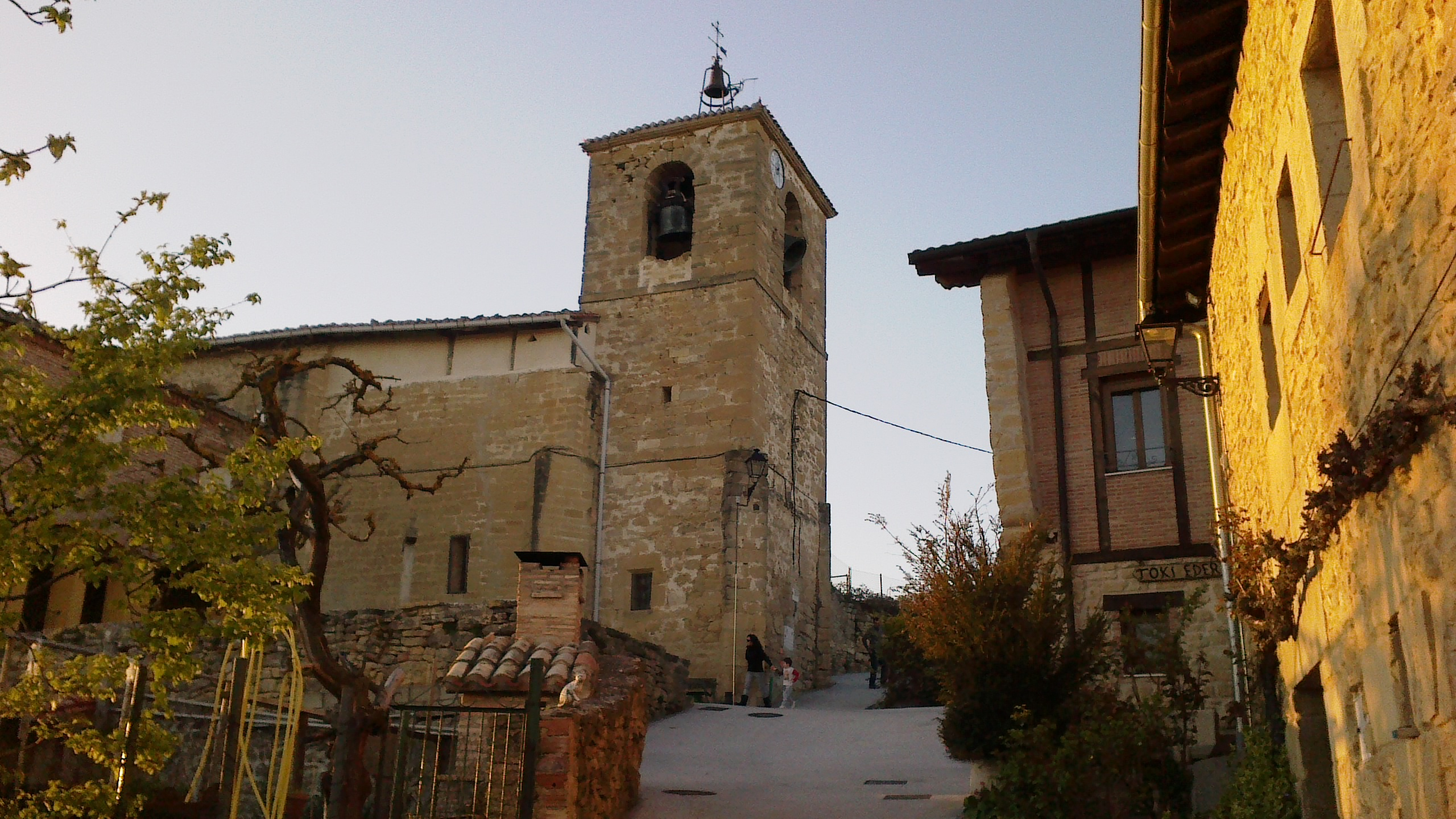
- View of Tuyo

- Location within Álava Location within the Basque Country Location within Spain
- Coordinates: 42°47′00″N 2°50′48″W
- Country: Spain
- Autonomous community: Basque Country
- Province: Álava
- Comarca: Añana
- Municipality: Ribera Alta/Erriberagoitia

Area
  - Total: 4.79 km^{2} (1.85 sq mi)
- Elevation: 570 m (1,870 ft)

Population (2023)
  - Total: 92
  - Density: 19/km^{2} (50/sq mi)
- Postal code: 01428

Tuyo is a hamlet and concejo in the municipality of Ribera Alta/Erriberagoitia, in Álava province, Basque Country, Spain.
