= Ribera Alta =

Ribera Alta can refer to:

- Ribera Alta/Erriberagoitia, a municipality in the province of Álava, Basque Country, Spain;
- Ribera Alta (comarca), a comarca in the province of Valencia, Spain.
