= List of municipalities in the Basque Country =

The following list is of important municipalities in the Basque Country, an autonomous community of Spain:

== Provincial lists ==
The following links are to lists which are more detailed province-specific, and all municipalities in a given province are ranked by population.

- List of municipalities in Álava
- List of municipalities in Biscay
- List of municipalities in Gipuzkoa

== Largest municipalities by population ==
Rank	Name	Population (2018)
1	Bilbao	345,821
2	Vitoria-Gasteiz	249,176
3	San Sebastián	186,665
4	Barakaldo	100,435
5	Getxo	78,276
6	Irun	61,983
7	Portugalete	45,826
8	Santurtzi	45,795
9	Basauri	40,762
10	Errenteria	39,355
11	Leioa	31,495
12	Durango	29,636
13	Galdakao	29,288
14	Sestao	27,445
15	Eibar	27,406
16	Erandio	24,222
17	Zarautz	23,223
18	Mondragón	22,019
19	Hernani	20,222
20	Tolosa	19,525
21	Amorebieta-Etxano	19,140
22	Lasarte-Oria	18,253
23	Laudio/Llodio	18,205
24	Mungia	17,554
25	Hondarribia	17,018
26	Guernica	16,972
27	Bermeo	16,688
28	Pasaia	16,128
29	Ermua	15,890
30	Azpeitia	14,786

== See also ==
- Comarcas of the Basque Country
