= Erriberagoitia/Ribera Alta =

Ribera Alta / Erriberagoitia
- Municipality
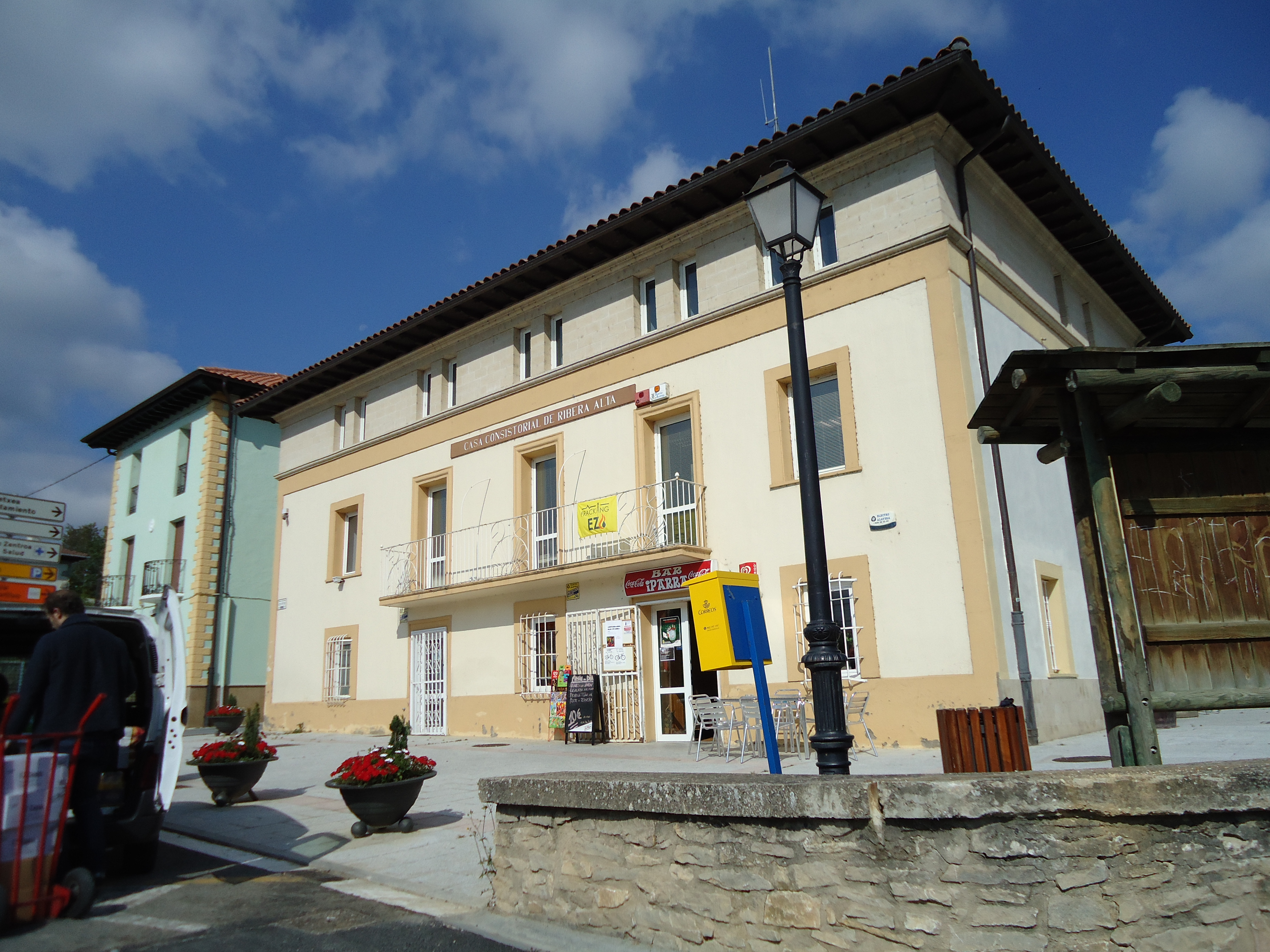

- Coat of arms

- Location of Ribera Alta/Erriberagoitia within the Basque Country
- Coordinates: 42°48′26″N 2°55′3″W
- Country: Spain
- Autonomous Community: Basque Country
- Province: Álava
- Comarca: Cuadrilla de Añana

Government
  - Mayor: Jesus Berganza Gonzalez

Area
  - Total: 119.78 km^{2} (46.25 sq mi)
- Elevation (AMSL): 549 m (1,801 ft)

Population (2025-01-01)
  - Total: 839
  - Density: 7.00/km^{2} (18.1/sq mi)
- Time zone: UTC+1 (CET)
  - Summer (DST): UTC+2 (CEST (GMT +2))
- Postal code: 01420

Ribera Altain Spanish or Erriberagoitia in Basque is a municipality located in the province of Álava, in the Basque Country of northern Spain.

== Localities ==
The municipality is made up of 25 villages, 21 organized in turn into 20 councils, and four administered directly by the municipality.

Bolded locations denote directly administrated villages.

**Name**		**Population**				
**Spanish**	**Basque**	**2000**	**2005**	**2010**	**2015**	**2019**
Antezana de la Ribera	Antezana de la Ribera	40	54	43	42	42
Anúcita	Anuntzeta/Anúcita	51	49	67	81	76
**Arbígano**	**Arbigano**	4	5	12	17	20
Arreo	Arreo	6	4	4	5	7
Artaza-Escota (Note: Artaza-Escota comprises the villages Artaza and Escota, whose population figures are combined for this table.)	Artaza-Escota/ Artatza-Axkoeta	21	25	30	34	29
Barrón	Barrón	17	19	19	21	15
Basquiñuelas	Basquiñuelas	8	6	6	6	5
Caicedo-Sopeña	Caicedo-Sopeña	20	17	23	33	36
**Castillo Sopeña**	**Castillo Sopeña**	8	5	4	3	3
Hereña	Hereña	22	18	13	13	31
Lasierra	Lasierra	9	10	7	12	13
Leciñana de la Oca	Leciñana de la Oca	19	20	17	13	10
Morillas	Morillas	31	32	31	18	28
**Nuvilla**	**Nuvilla**	7	9	10	13	9
Ormijana	Ormijana	20	19	26	25	33
Paúl	Paul	23	29	42	48	41
Pobes	Pobes	85	91	170	157	139
**San Miguel**	**San Miguel**	7	9	7	7	5
Subijana-Morillas	Subijana-Morillas	50	58	65	66	78
Tuyo	Tuyo	33	34	78	82	83
Viloria	Viloria	22	24	24	22	25
Villabezana	Villabezana	20	24	24	25	25
Villaluenga	Villaluenga	11	15	14	12	15
Villambrosa	Villambrosa	9	10	14	18	17
**TOTAL**		543	586	750	773	785
