= Pobes =

Village in Álava, Spain

- Concejo
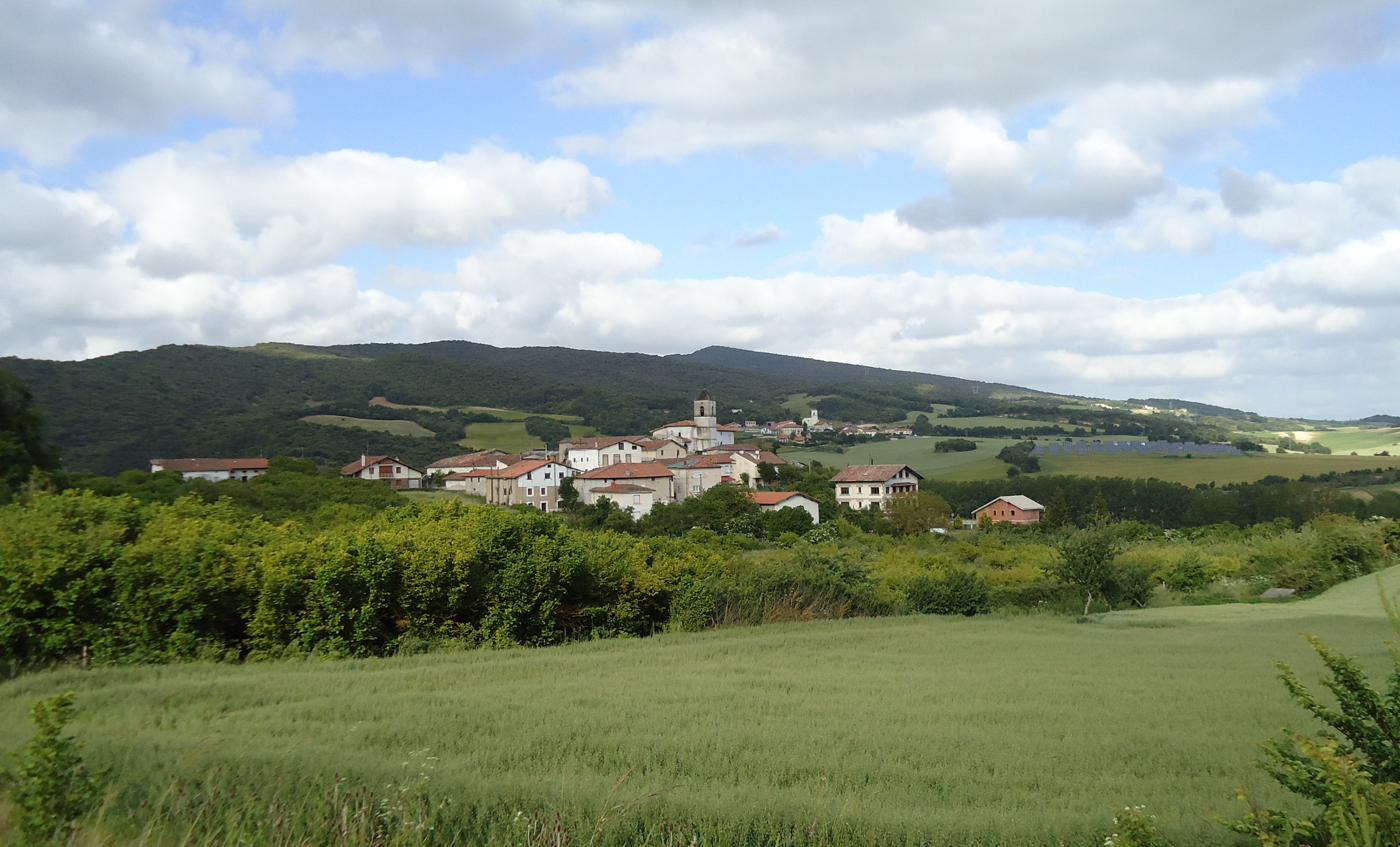
- View of Pobes

- Location within Álava Location within the Basque Country Location within Spain
- Coordinates: 42°48′07″N 2°54′34″W
- Country: Spain
- Autonomous community: Basque Country
- Province: Álava
- Comarca: Añana
- Municipality: Ribera Alta/Erriberagoitia

Area
  - Total: 2.77 km^{2} (1.07 sq mi)
- Elevation: 549 m (1,801 ft)

Population (2022)
  - Total: 143
  - Density: 51.6/km^{2} (134/sq mi)
- Postal code: 01420

Pobes is a village and concejo located in the municipality of Ribera Alta/Erriberagoitia, in Álava province, Basque Country, Spain. It is the capital of the municipality.
