= Wolf trap =

Medieval Hunting Method

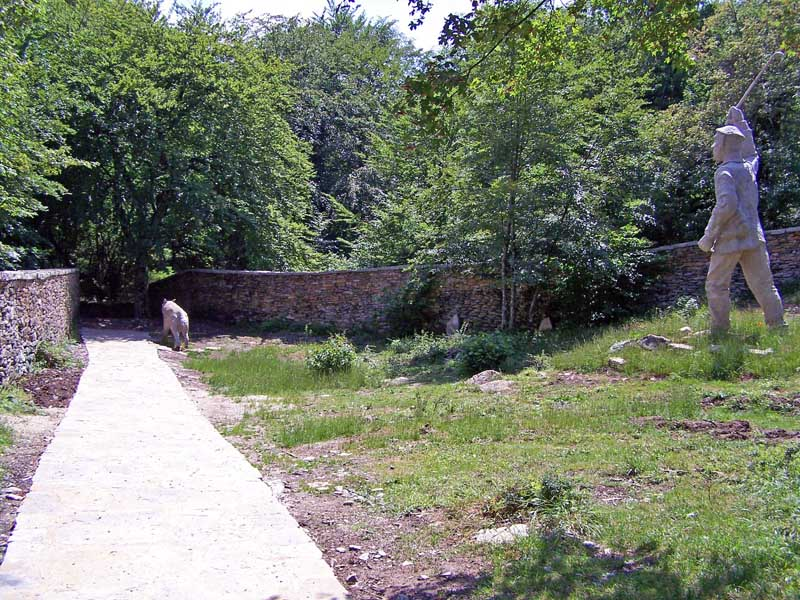
a preserved lobera in Monte Santiago, with statues of wolf and hunter

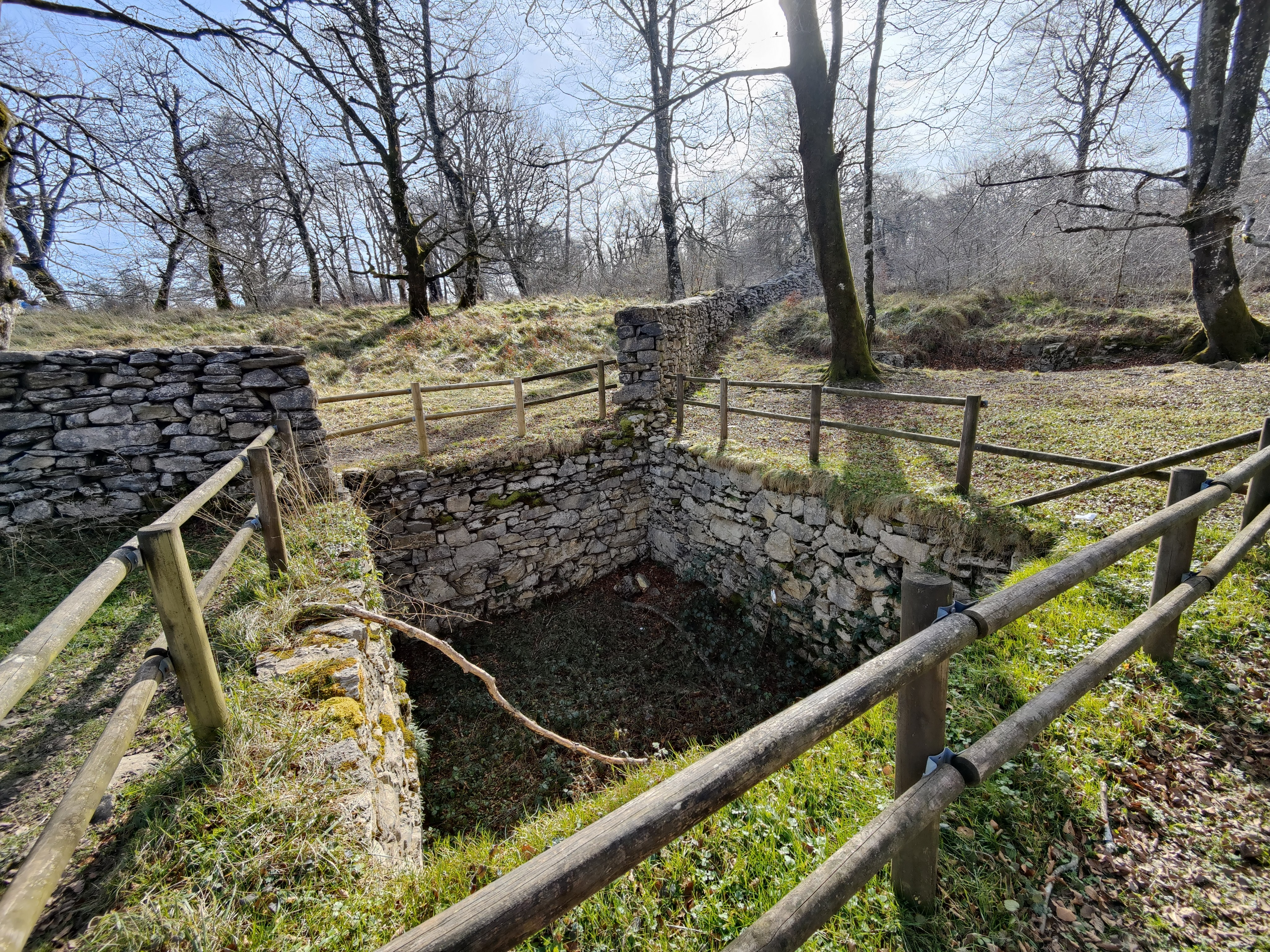
Pit of the lobera de Hoyo Nuevo en Monte Santiago, Burgos, Spain

A wolf trap (Spanish lobera, Italian luparia, Portuguese fojo) was a chase ending in a pit with trapdoor and stakes used by beaters in hunting wolves in medieval Europe.

== See also ==
- Wolf hunting
- Trapping pit
