= Ribera Baja/Erribera Beitia =

Ribera Baja / Erribera Beitia
- Municipality
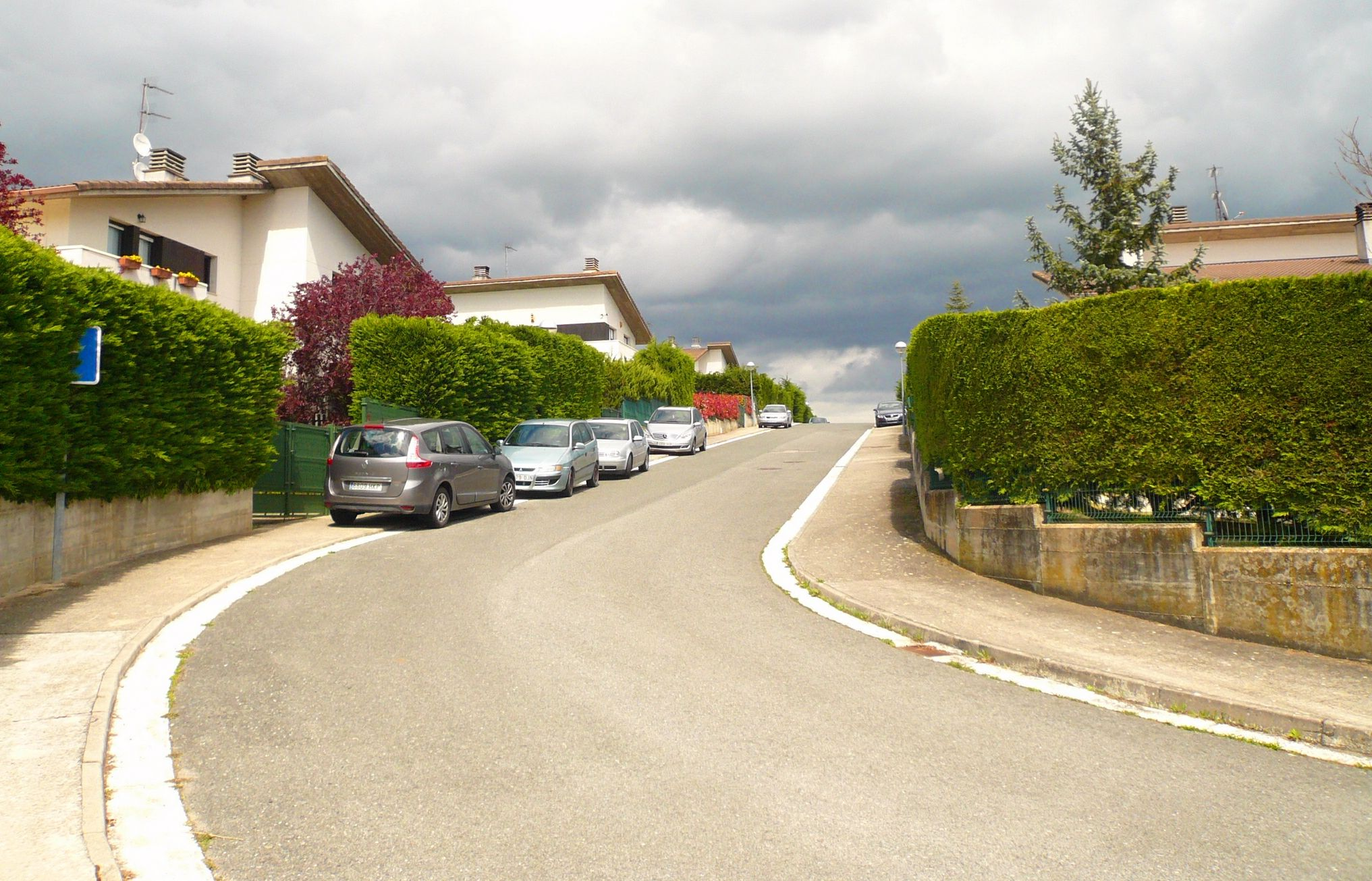
- Manzanos in Ribera Baja

- Coat of arms

- Location of Ribera Baja/Erribera Beitia within the Basque Country
- Coordinates: 42.739764°N 2.891276°W
- Country: Spain
- Autonomous community: Basque Country
- Province: Araba/Álava
- Eskualdea / Comarca: Añana

Government
  - Mayor: Pedro Montoya Ruiz

Area
  - Total: 119.78 km^{2} (46.25 sq mi)
- Elevation: 545 m (1,788 ft)

Population (2025-01-01)
  - Total: 1,477
- Postal code: 01420

Ribera Baja in Spanish or Erribera Beitia in Basque (also alternative Erriberabeitia) is a town and municipality located in the province of Álava, in the Basque Country, northern Spain. It has a population of 1359 inhabitants.

Rivabellosa is the capital and main town of the municipality. It has more than 80% of the municipal population. Rivabellosa is also the capital of the region of Alava called Cuadrilla de Añana.
