= Zambrana =

- Municipality
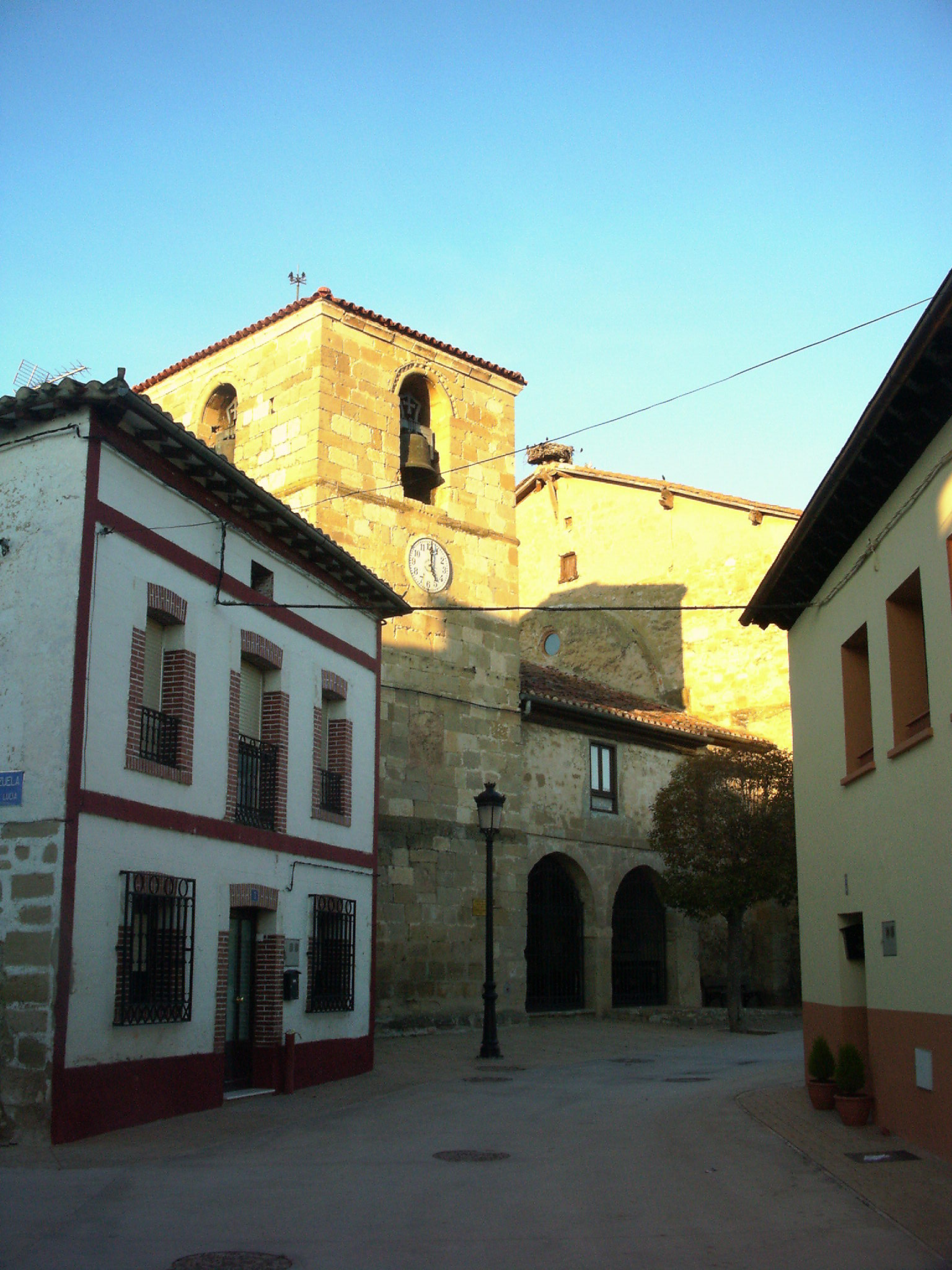
- Argiñe Deuna church in Zambrana

- Coat of arms

- Location of Zambrana within the Basque Country Location of Zambrana within Spain
- Coordinates: 42°39′42″N 2°52′49″W
- Country: Spain
- Autonomous community: Basque Country
- Province: Álava
- Judicial district: Cuadrilla de Añana
- Municipality: Zambrana
- Established: 1744

Government
  - Mayor: Aitor Abecia Jimenez (AIZ)

Area
  - Total: 39.5 km^{2} (15.3 sq mi)
- Elevation: 459 m (1,506 ft)

Population (2025-01-01)
  - Total: 452
- Time zone: UTC + 1
- Postal code: 01212
- Distances: 6.3 km to Miranda de Ebro; 8.9 km to Haro; 22.0 km to Álava
- Official languages: Spanish, Basque
- Demonym: Zambrano
- Website: Ayuntamiento de Zambrana

Zambrana is a town and municipality located in the province of Álava, in the Basque region of northern Spain. It may be the origin of the popular Hispanic surname Zambrano.
