= Añana =

- Municipality
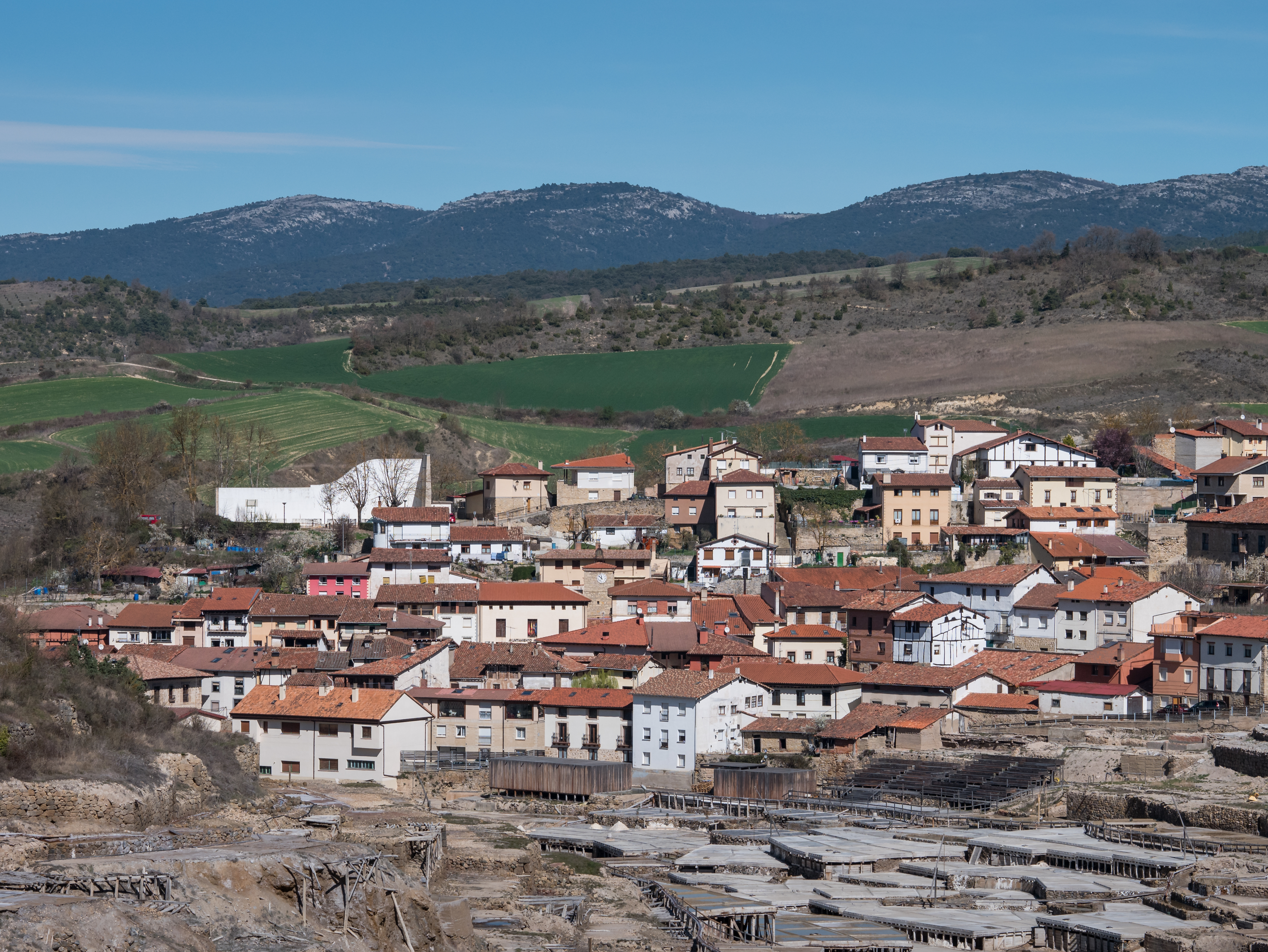
- Village of Salinas de Añana

- Coat of arms

- Location within the Basque Country
- Coordinates: 42°48′08″N 2°59′10″W
- Country: Spain
- Autonomous community: Basque Country
- Province: Álava
- Comarca: Cuadrilla de Añana

Government
  - Mayor: Juan Carlos Medina Martínez (EAJ/PNV)

Area
  - Total: 21.92 km^{2} (8.46 sq mi)

Population (2025-01-01)
  - Total: 141
  - Density: 6.43/km^{2} (16.7/sq mi)
- Time zone: UTC+1 (CET)
  - Summer (DST): UTC+2 (CEST)
- Postal code: 01423
- Official language(s): Basque, Spanish

Añana is both a valley and municipality located in the province of Álava, in the Basque Country, northern Spain. Its main population center is the village of Salinas de Añana (Basque: Gesaltza Añana). Moreover, Añana is also the name of one of the seven counties in which the province of Álava is divided. The town is renowned for its old salt flats, which were formed beginning in the Triassic Period.

== Salt Valley ==
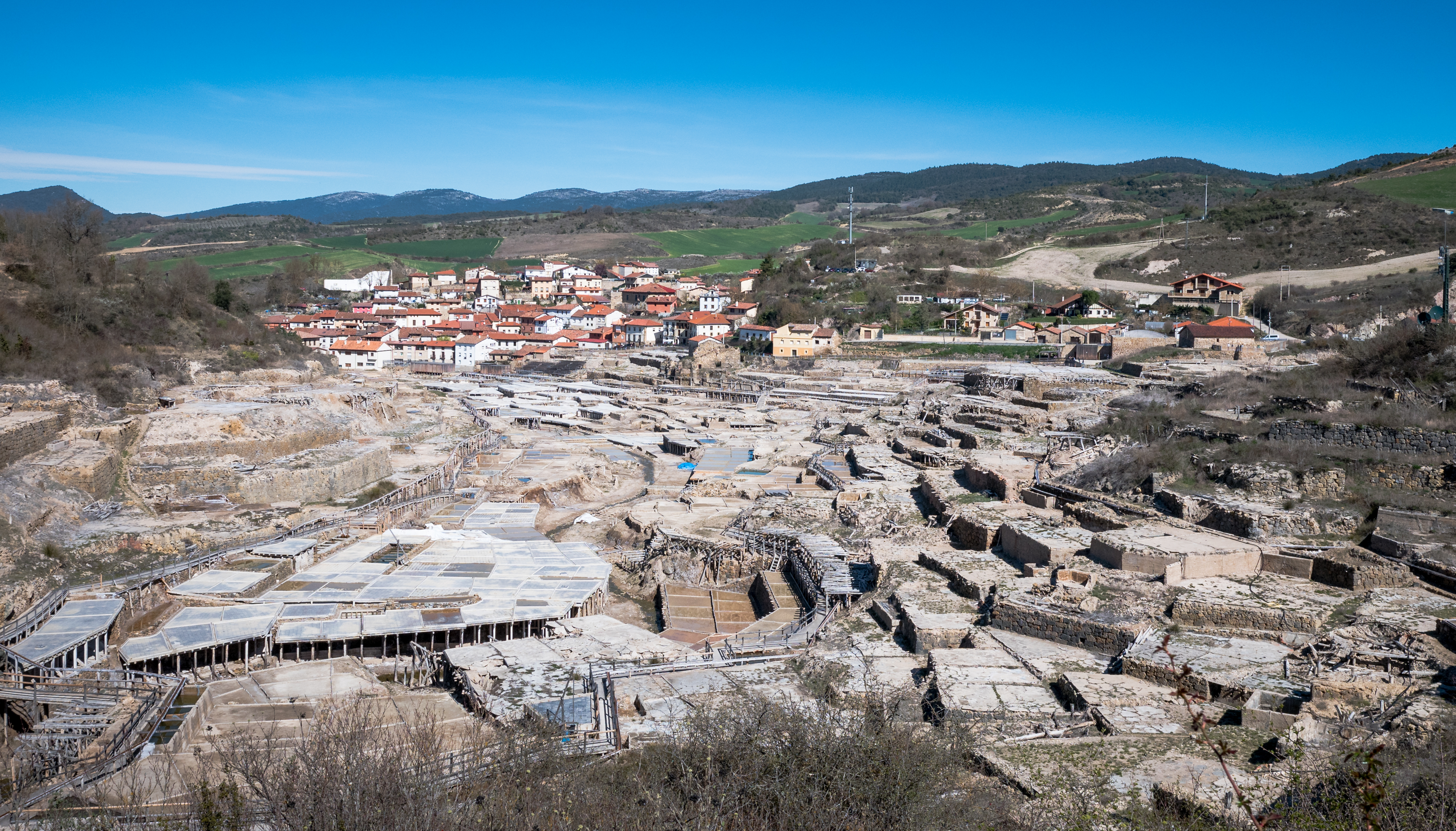
View of Añana

The salt water in the valley of Añana emerges from natural springs, where it is extracted using evaporation in pans. Archeological evidence suggests the site has been in use for 7,000 years making this the oldest active salt production site in the world. The salt pans as they are seen today were mostly developed in the first century BCE. Over 5,000 pans have been built since Roman times, with exportation of its salt a major business, especially after the year 1114 when special rights were granted to the town. It was claimed by the Spanish crown in 1564 who oversaw salt production until 1868. By the 1970s, production had decreased and the pans were largely abandoned as marine salt production had become cheaper and more efficient. At the end of the 20th century the salt pans began to be restored as a not-for-profit organisation, with a significant production of gourmet salts as well as spa tourism to bring needed income to the area. The site was added to the European Route of Industrial Heritage in 2019.
