= Comarcas of the Basque Country =

The 20 Eskualdeak/Comarcas of the Basque Country as defined by the Eustat statistical institute

The autonomous community of the Basque Country within Spain contains several comarcas or eskualdeak in the Basque language, referring to local districts, grouped into its three long-established provinces.

The Basque Government's statistics department Eustat has divided the districts using a 20-comarca model (seven in Biscay, seven in Gipuzkoa and six in Álava) in its reports relating to the local economy and demographic trends on a consistent basis since at least 1999:

== List of comarcas ==
Comarca name			Province	Population (January 2020)
English	Spanish	Basque	Province	Population (January 2020)
Añana / Alava Valleys	Cuadrilla de Añana / Valles Alaveses	Añanako Koadrila / Arabako Haranak	Álava	6,159
Ayala / Cantabrian Alava	Cuadrilla de Ayala / Cantábrica Alavesa	Aiarako Koadrila / Kantauri Arabarra	Álava	34,704
Riojan Alava	Cuadrilla de Rioja Alavesa	Arabako Errioxako Eskualdea	Álava	11,624
Plain of Alava	Llanada Alavesa	Arabako Lautada	Álava	265,868
Alava Mountains	Montaña Alavesa	Arabako Mendialdea	Álava	3,023
Lands of Gorbea	Cuadrilla de la Estribaciones del Gorbea/ Cuadrilla de Zuia	Gorbeialdeko Kuadrilla/ Zuiako Eskualdea	Álava	8,831
Arratia-Nerbioi	Arratia-Nervión	Arratia-Nerbioi	Biscay	24,024
Lands of Busturia-Urdaibai/ Guernica-Bermeo	Guernica-Bermeo/ Busturialdea-Urdaibai	Gernika-Bermeo/ Busturialdea-Urdaibai	Biscay	45,973
Lands of Durango	Duranguesado	Durangaldea	Biscay	100,052
Enkarterri	Las Encartaciones	Enkartazioak	Biscay	32,021
Greater Bilbao	Gran Bilbao	Bilbo Handia	Biscay	863,090
Lea-Artibai/ Markina-Ondarroa	Lea Artibai/ Marquina-Ondárroa	Lea-Artibai/ Markina-Ondarroa	Biscay	26,217
Lands of Mungia/ Plentzia-Mungia/ Lands of Uribe-Butroe	Mungialdea/ Plencia-Mungia/ Uribe-Butroe	Mungialdea/ Plentzia-Mungia/ Uribe-Butroe	Biscay	57,667
Lower Bidasoa	Bajo Bidasoa	Bidasoa Behea	Gipuzkoa	77,192
Lower Deba	Bajo Deva	Debabarrena	Gipuzkoa	55,870
Upper Deba	Alto Deva	Debagoiena	Gipuzkoa	63,313
Lands of San Sebastián	Comarca de San Sebastián	Donostialdea	Gipuzkoa	329,086
Goierri	Goyerri	Goierri	Gipuzkoa	68,719
Lands of Tolosa	Zona de Tolosa	Tolosaldea	Gipuzkoa	49,546
Urola Coast	Urola Costa	Urola Kosta	Gipuzkoa	76,732

=== Alternative definitions ===
As the comarca boundaries are not defined in law, various other broadly similar combinations have been published depending on the date, range and purpose of the data collection. Examples include:

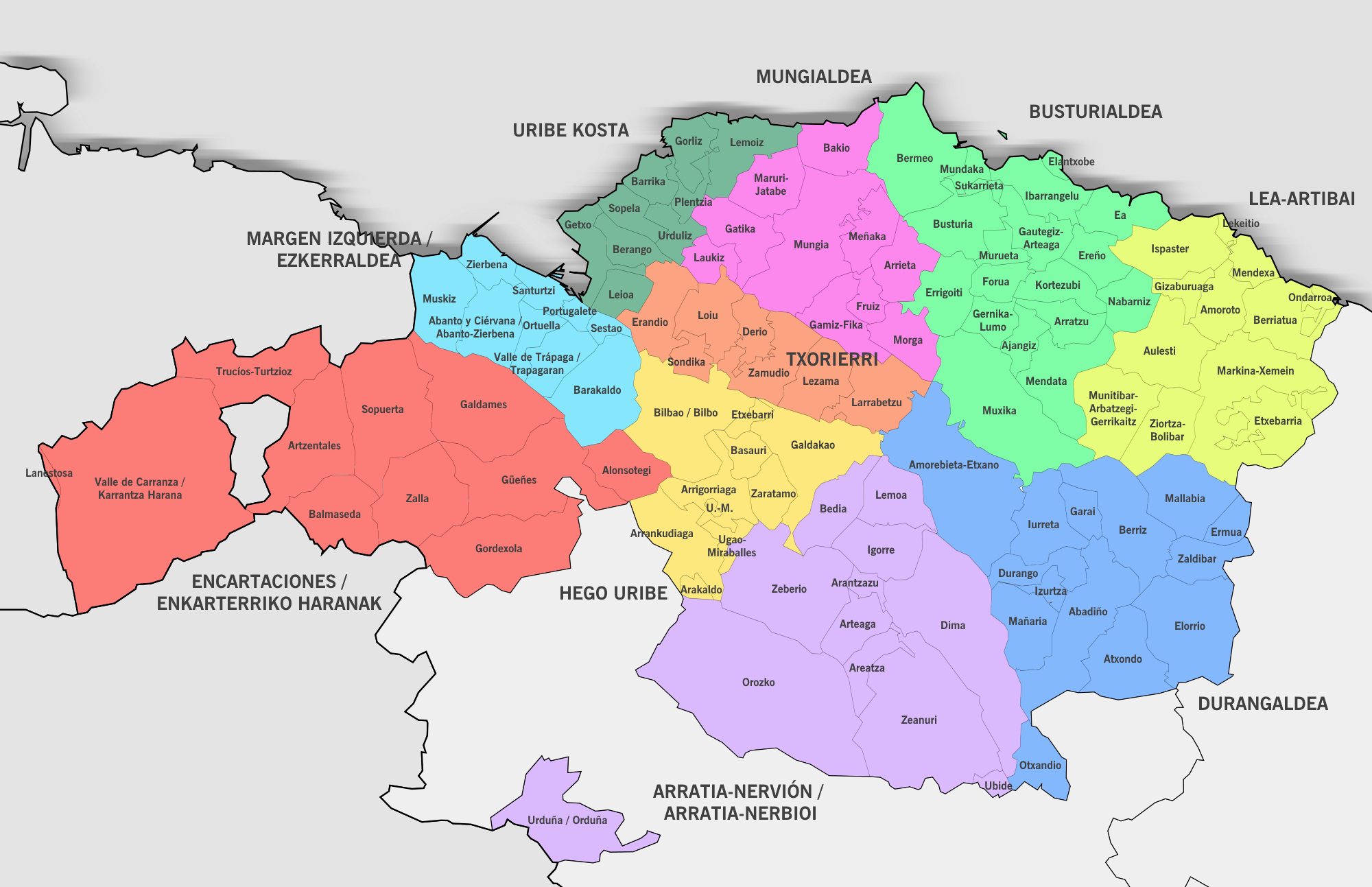
Alternative arrangement in Biscay with 10 divisions, as defined by the Euskaltzaindia in 2016

Biscay province: the conurbations on either side of the Estuary of Bilbao within the Greater Bilbao comarca, known as the Left Bank and the Right Bank, are sometimes counted separately both from one another and from the city of Bilbao itself. Less commonly, the Getxo area on the Right Bank and the adjacent suburban Txorierri valley are grouped in a Uribe-Kosta district along with those in Mungialdea (referred to by Eustat as Plentzia-Mungia, with the term Uribe-Bertoe also used), while the Left Bank and the Meatzaldea, the area's former mining zone, is merged into the mainly rural western Enkarterri comarca which previously governed the districts as a larger merindad, as was the case for the Right Bank in the Uribe merindad. The Hego Uribe area south of Bilbao tends to remain grouped with the city when other adjustments are made, or is linked with Arratia-Nervión if counted as an outlying zone.

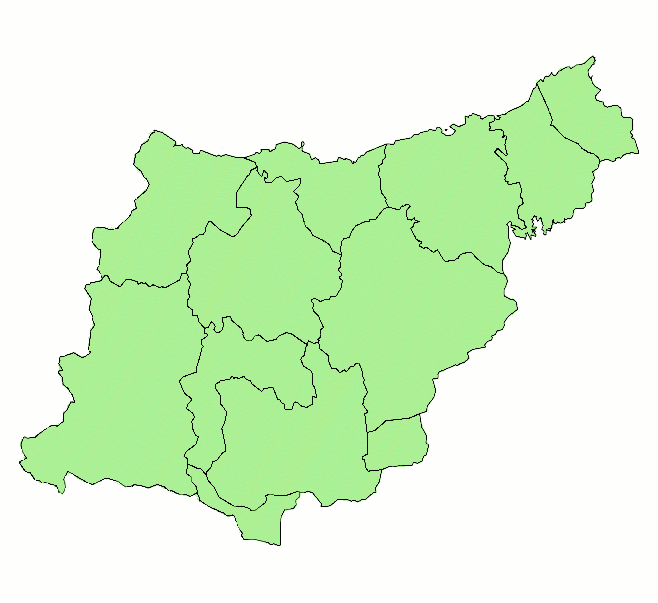
Alternative arrangement in Gipuzkoa with 10 divisions

Gipuzkoa province: the southern portion of the Urola Kosta comarca (primarily Azpeitia and Azkoitia) has been listed separately as Urola Erdia (Mid-Urola). Similarly, the western part of Goierri (around Zumarraga) has been recorded as the separate Urola Garaia (Upper Urola) district. In the Donostialdea comarca (by far the most heavily populated, containing the city of San Sebastián and its satellite towns), the eastern part centred on Errenteria and Pasaia has been referred to as Oarsoaldea, and in some cases this has been combined with neighbouring Bidasoaldea, with the Oarsoaldea name even being adopted by some for this larger area. Less commonly, the name Buruntzaldea has been used to refer collectively to the cluster of towns south of San Sebastián (Lasarte-Oria, Hernani, Astigarraga, Andoain).

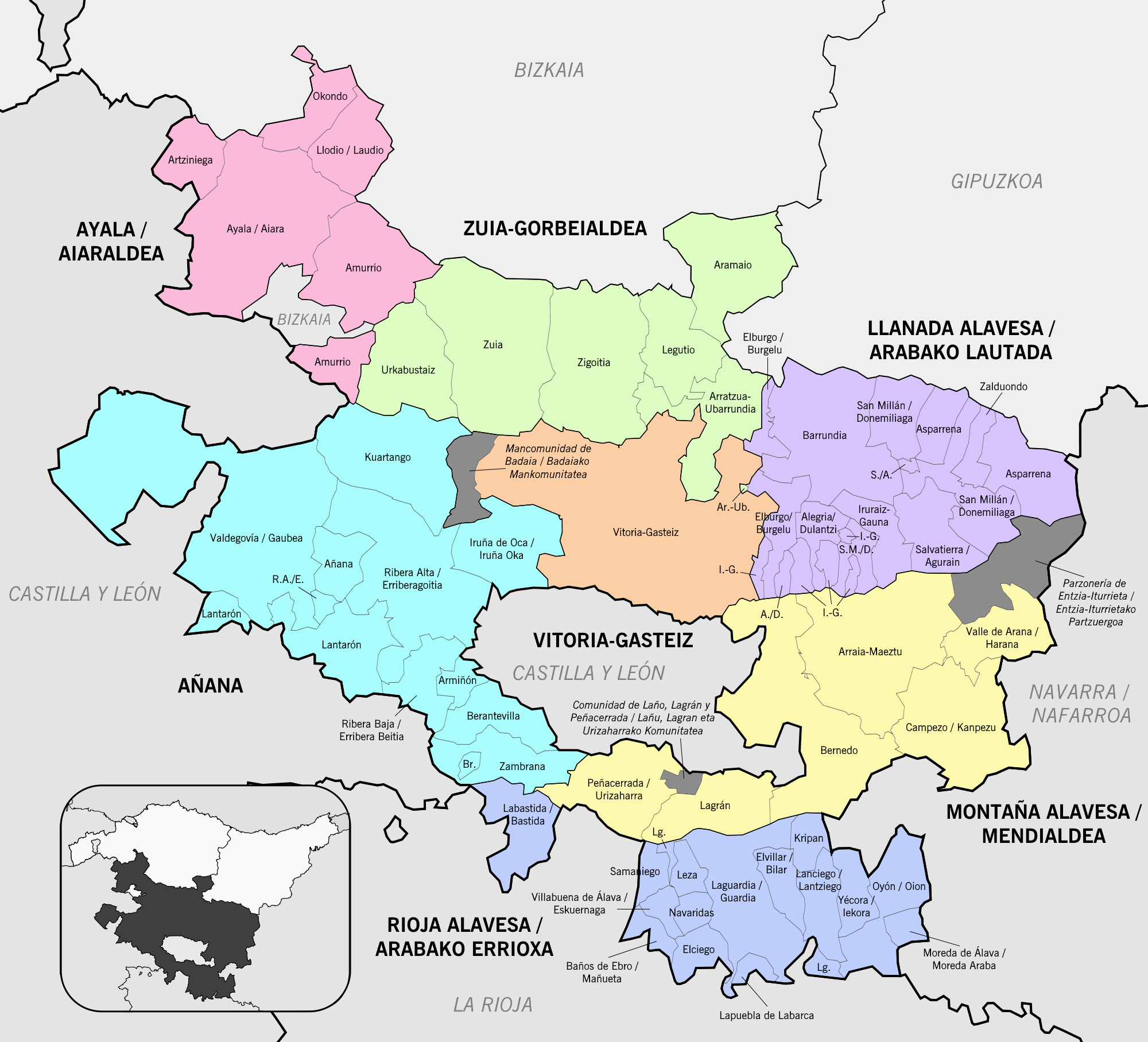
Alternative arrangement in Álava with 7 divisions

Álava province: the main deviation from the Eustat comarcas (known here as cuadrillas) is in the representation of the capital Vitoria-Gasteiz, which alternatively has its own district comprising its urban municipality alone. In this alignment the western part of the rump Llanada Alavesa comarca is assigned to Gorbeialdea. The territory of Treviño is entirely surrounded by Álava, but is an exclave of the Province of Burgos and does not figure in the Basque considerations (its future status is a matter of dispute between the administrations).

== Population contrasts ==
As with the municipalities across Spain, the populations of each comarca vary widely; rural sectors of Álava cover only a few thousand residents each, while its capital Vitoria-Gasteiz (which is also a single municipality) is considered either to be in its own comarca or by far the most prominent component of the wider Llanada Alavesa, containing over 250,000 residents under either arrangement. In Gipuzkoa, the Donostialdea comarca (population 330,000) includes not only the provincial capital San Sebastián (municipality population 185,000) but many of the smaller towns surrounding the city, leading to two further subdivisions being created in some contexts to represent these communities in a more balanced way. The most striking contrast is in Biscay, where the capital city Bilbao (again a single municipality with approximately 350,000 residents) is just one part of the Greater Bilbao comarca which has 850,000 within its boundaries. Bilbao's eight city districts are comparable in population to four of the province's other more rural comarcas, despite in theory being two administrative levels below.

== See also ==
- Category:People by comarca in the Basque Country (autonomous community)
- Comarcas of Spain
- List of municipalities in the Basque Country
