= Cuadrilla de Añana =

Cuadrilla de Añana/Añanako kuadrilla
- Comarca
- Coat of arms

- Location within Álava
- Coordinates: 42.7714°N 2.91879°W
- Country: Spain
- Autonomous community: Basque Country
- Province: Álava
- Seat: Ribabellosa

Government
  - President of the Council: Rubén Torremocha

Area
  - Total: 693.2 km^{2} (267.6 sq mi)

Population (2022)
  - Total: 9,593
  - Density: 13.84/km^{2} (35.84/sq mi)
- Time zone: UTC+1 (CET)
  - Summer (DST): UTC+2 (CEST)

The Cuadrilla de Añana (Basque: Añanako kuadrilla) is one of the seven cuadrillas (comarcas or regions) of the province of Álava. The capital lies at Rivabellosa in the municipality of Ribera Baja but the most populated place is the village of Nanclares de la Oca in the municipality of Iruña de Oca.
