= Nanclares de la Oca =

Village in Álava, Spain

Nanclares de la Oca/Langraiz Oka
- Concejo
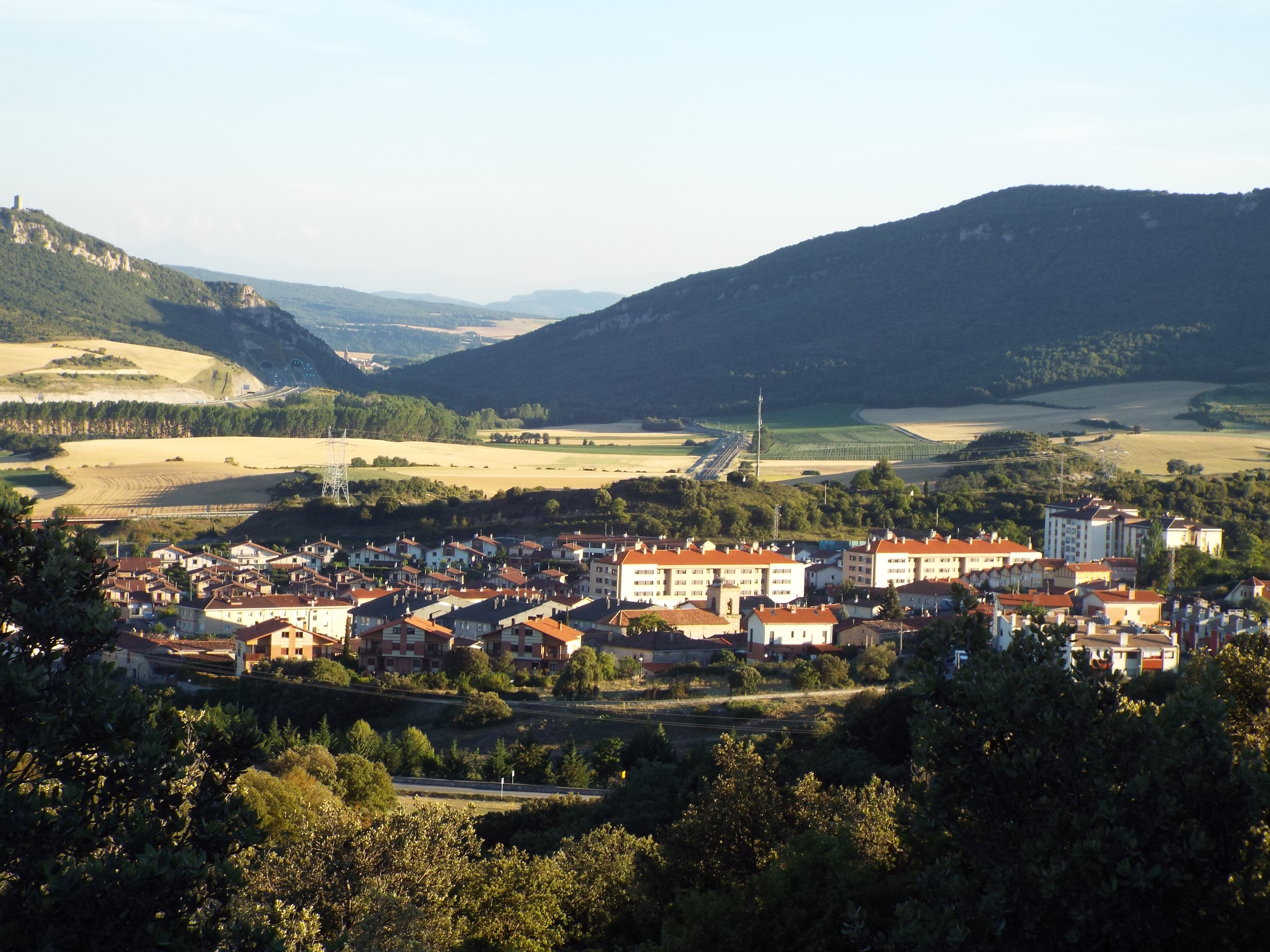
- View of Nanclares from Badaia

- Coat of arms

- Location within Álava Location within the Basque Country Location within Spain
- Coordinates: 42°49′04″N 2°48′29″W
- Country: Spain
- Autonomous community: Basque Country
- Province: Álava
- Comarca: Añana
- Municipality: Iruña de Oca/Iruña Oka

Area
  - Total: 17.09 km^{2} (6.60 sq mi)
- Elevation: 498 m (1,634 ft)

Population (2022)
  - Total: 2,673
  - Density: 156.4/km^{2} (405.1/sq mi)
- Demonyms: Spanish: nanclarino, -na; Basque: langraiztarra
- Time zone: UTC+1 (CET)
  - Summer (DST): UTC+2 (CEST)
- Postal code: 01230
- Official language(s): Spanish, Basque

Nanclares de la Oca (Spanish pronunciation: [naŋˈklaɾes ðe la ˈoka]) or Langraiz Oka (Basque pronunciation: [langrais̻ oka]) is a village and concejo in the province of Álava, in the Basque Country, Spain. It is also the seat of the municipality of Iruña de Oca and the most populated settlement in the Cuadrilla de Añana comarca. The village is located in the western part of the Llanada Alavesa, roughly 12 kilometres (7.5 mi) away from the capital of the Basque Country, Vitoria-Gasteiz.

It was an independent municipality (consisting of Nanclares de la Oca itself, Montevite and Ollávarre) until 1976, when it was merged with Iruña to form the current municipality of Iruña de Oca.

== History ==
=== First settlements and Roman Age ===
The first term related to Nanclares de la Oca was found on a Celtiberian stela which referred to the area's towns as "Langrares". For this reason, experts think there were pre-Roman settlements in the area.

Roman ruins have also been found in Iruña-Veleia, an ancient city located near Nanclares, and during some recent excavations made in Nanclares. The arrival of the Romans changed the style of life and turned Iruña-Veleia and its surroundings into an important area.

=== The Middle Ages ===
There are data about several Templar settlements in The Middle Ages. The suffix "Oca" is thought to be related with the Templars, as they called the area where they lived "Tierra de la Oca" (lit. 'The Land of Geese'). Still, the origin is not certain.

The village of Nanclares de la Oca is included in the Catalogue of Álava's Towns which is part of the Reja de San Millán, written in 1025. The village is mentioned as "Alfoces Langrares". In the Middle Ages, an alfoz was the name given in the Iberian Peninsula to a territory which belonged to a villa and was divided in different councils; in this case the councils of Transponte, Adanna, Lermanda, Margarita, Suvillana, Quintaniella de Sursun, Billodas, Langrares, Oto, Mandoiana, and Lopeggana.

=== Until the 19th century ===
During the Spanish Independence War there were many English soldiers near the village, especially in the Battle of Vitoria. The soldiers belonged to the fourth and light military divisions, which were under the order of Wellington. Additionally, there were some British cavalry troops commanded by Robert Hill, Grant, and Ponsonby; and a Portuguese one led by D'urban. Their mission was to wait in Nanclares de la Oca until Hill's troops conquered the heights of La Puebla; so that they could cross the Zadorra river and attack directly their enemy.

The Carlist Wars also took place in Nanclares. As a consequence, nowadays there are three castles (Almoreta, Vayagüen, and El Encinal) in the surrounding area.

In the second half of the 19th century, a spa was built, known as Bolen or Bolem. It had a great success, and was catalogued as one of the best in Europe. At the end of the century, the spa fell in decline and had to be closed. Some years later, in 1914, La Mennais Brothers settled in the area, rebuilt and restored the spa, and turned the place into a seminary, where future Brothers were indoctrinated. Nowadays, the building is a Secondary School called Colegio San José de Educación Secundaria Obligatoria.

=== 20th and 21st centuries ===
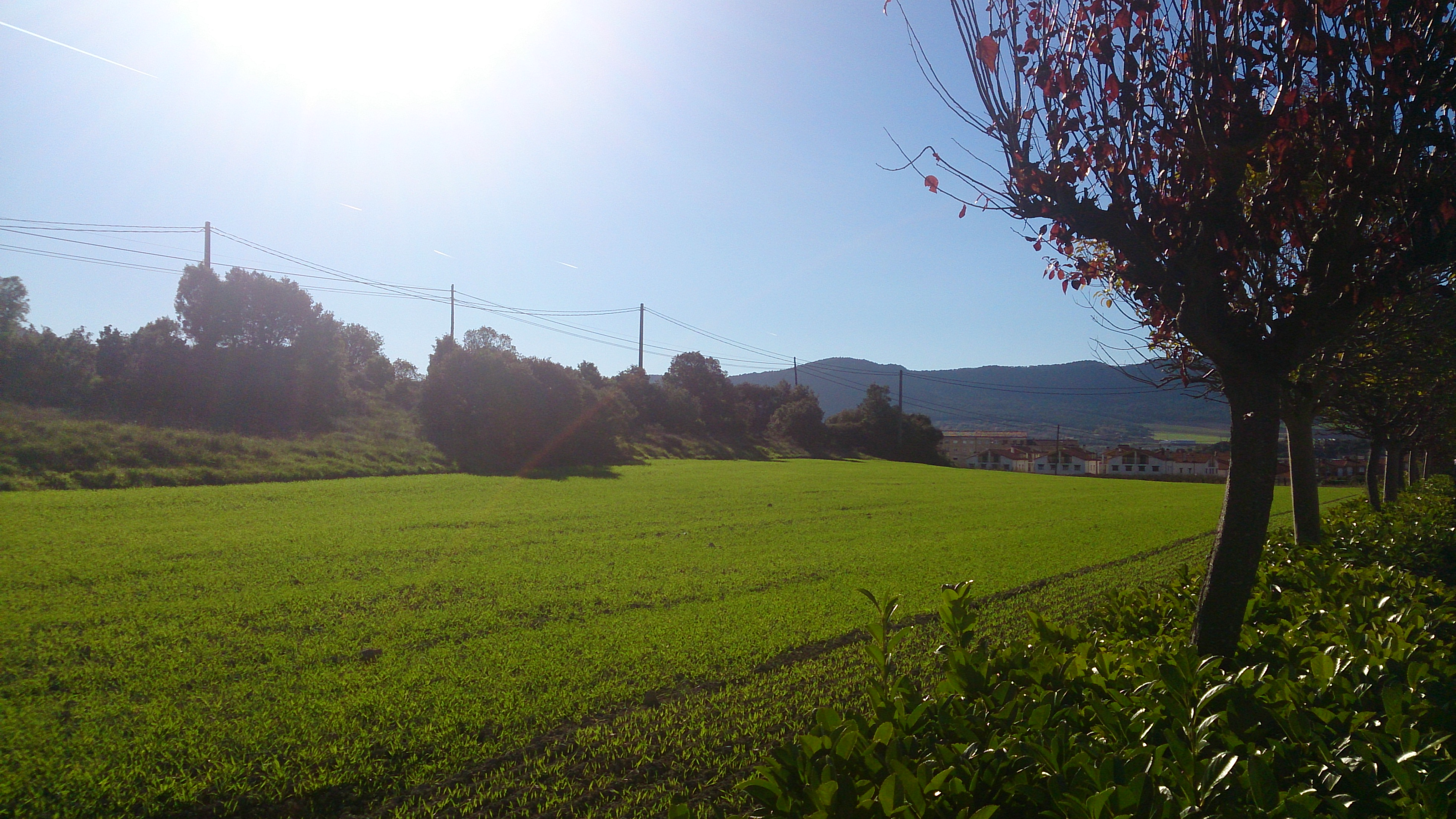
Local landscape

In the 20th century, the town grew considerably in length and population as a consequence of various migratory movements inside the Iberian Peninsula.

During the Spanish Civil War, a concentration camp was built near the town. It was used during the war and in the post-war era; many republican prisoners were kept in there. In the early 1980s, it was remodeled, and a jail was opened in its place. In 2011, a larger jail was built in San Miguel mountain to replace the previous one.

== Population ==
Historical population
Year	Pop.
1960	1,164
1970	1,369
1978	1,531
1981	1,345
2000	1,292
2001	1,350
2002	1,419
2003	1,456
2004	1,500
2005	1,593
2006	1,718
2007	1,807
2008	1,999
2009	2,093
2010	2,161
2011	2,163
2012	2,249
2013	2,278
2014	2,281
2015	2,337

The first census dates of 1802, at that time there were only 47 people living in Nanclares.

Census was taken in 1960, 1970, 1978, and 1981. From the year 2000 on, a census has been made every year.

== Landmarks ==
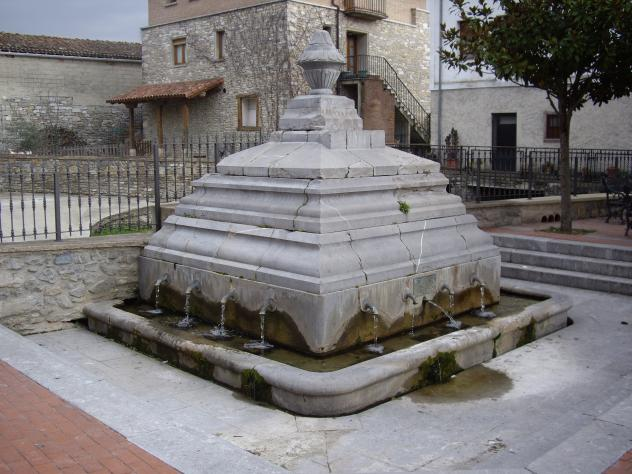
Fuente de los Doce Caños

The central square (Spanish: Plaza del Pueblo, Basque: Herriko enparantza) is dominated by the Fuente de los Doce Caños (Spanish for 'Fountain of the Twelve Spouts'), built in 1901, and the old wash-house. From the square, a little stone bridge can be seen crossing a stream called El Torco, which turns into a waterfall in winter.

=== The three towers ===
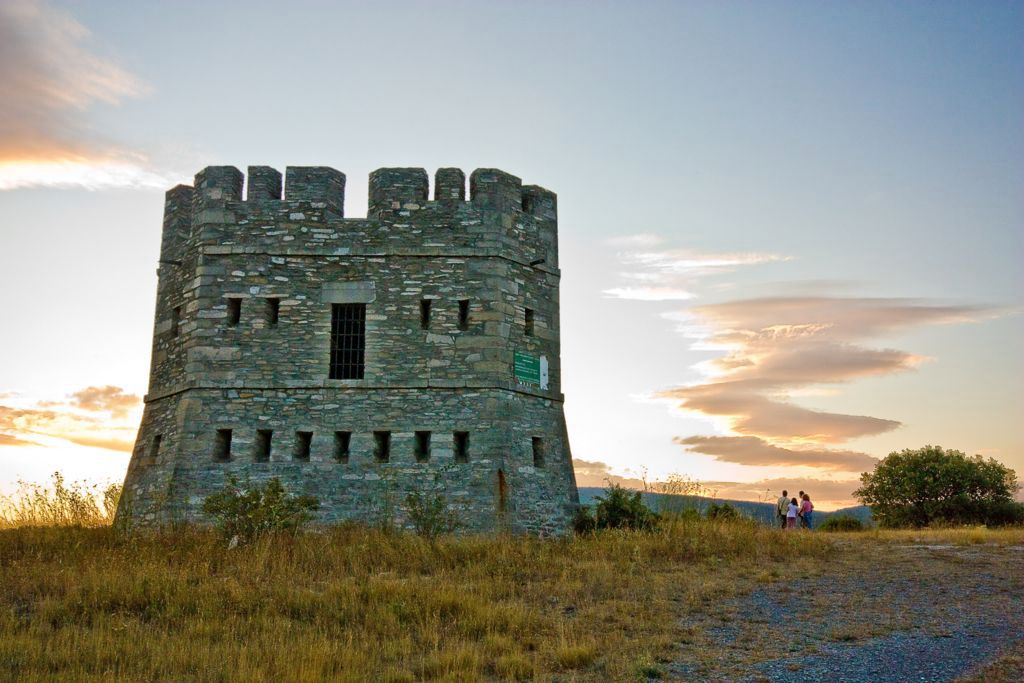
Vayagüen Tower

Three small towers were built by the Christinos during the Third Carlist War in the 19th century. They were used to guard, communicate, and defend the area.

- Vayagüen: With an area of 115 square metres (1,240 sq ft) and a height of 7.5 metres (25 ft), is the biggest tower in Nanclares. It was used as an optical telegraph station. It is located to the east, in front of the old jail.
- Almoreta: This small castle can be found in the southern part of the village, across the train tracks. It is the smallest of the three towers, with a surface area of just 70 square metres (750 sq ft). It was used both as an optical telegraph station and a fort. Nowadays it is a youth hostel.
- El Encinal: This tower is located in the Badaia Mountains, to the north of the village, and has an area of 94 square metres (1,010 sq ft).

=== El Calero ===
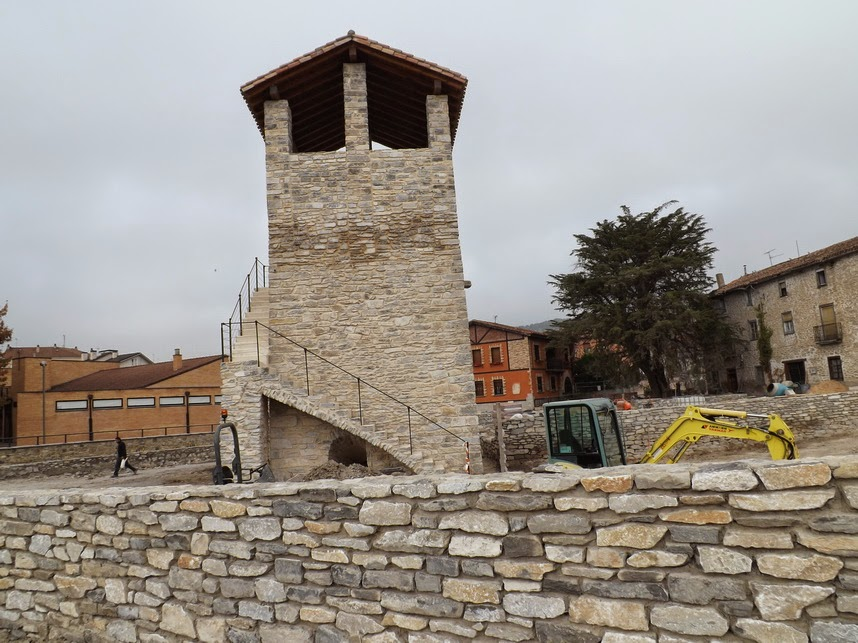
El Calero

El Calero was a lime oven built in 1850. It was a non-stop oven, since it was very high (15 m (49 ft)) and stones could be put inside the tower while the ones at the bottom were ready. The stones were heated at 1,000 °C (1,830 °F) and the process lasted a week. It was restored in 2013 and has been open to visitors since then.
