= Abetxuko =

Neighborhood and concejo in Vitoria-Gasteiz, Spain

- Neighborhood and concejo
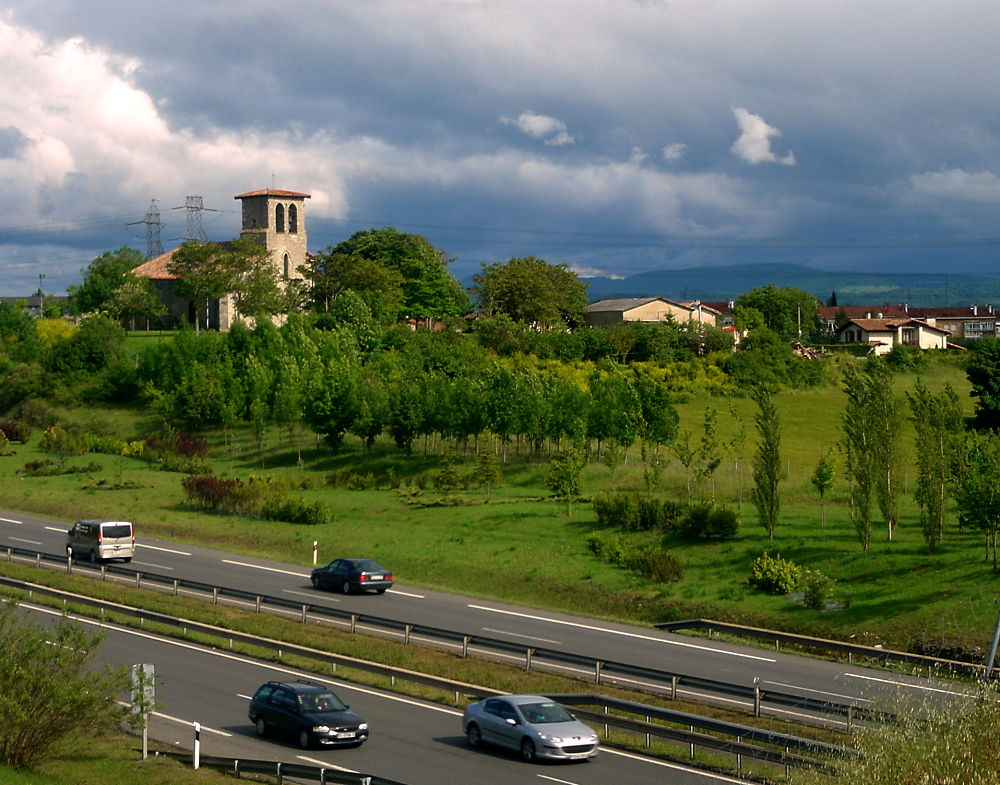
- Abetxuko is located on a hill, next to the A-1 motorway.

- Coat of arms

- Location within Álava Location within the Basque Country Location within Spain
- Coordinates: 42°52′32″N 2°40′45″W
- Country: Spain
- Autonomous community: Basque Country
- Province: Álava
- Comarca: Vitoria-Gasteiz
- Municipality: Vitoria-Gasteiz

Area
  - Neighborhood: 1.06 km^{2} (0.41 sq mi)
- Elevation: 524 m (1,719 ft)

Population (2022)
  - Neighborhood: 3,443
  - Neighborhood density: 3,250/km^{2} (8,410/sq mi)
  - Concejo: 29
- Postal code: 01013

Abetxuko (in Basque according to Euskaltzaindia: Abetxuku, Spanish: Abechuco) is a neighborhood and concejo in the municipality of Vitoria-Gasteiz in Álava, Basque Country, Spain. It is located north of the Zadorra river, which separates it from the rest of the city.

== History ==
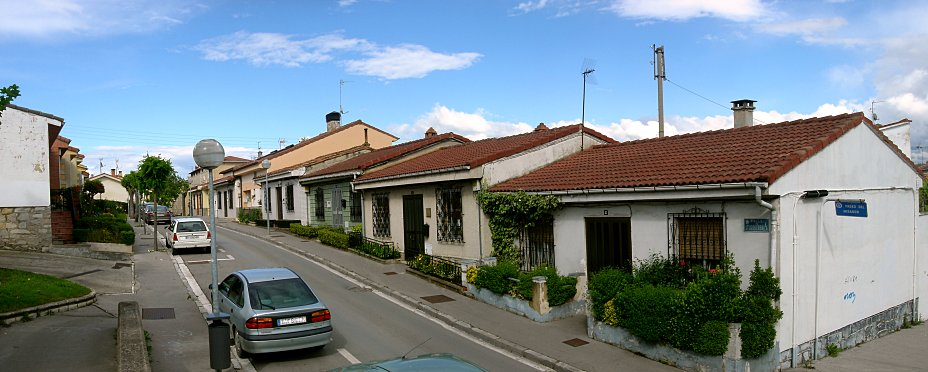
Single-family dwellings in Abetxuko.

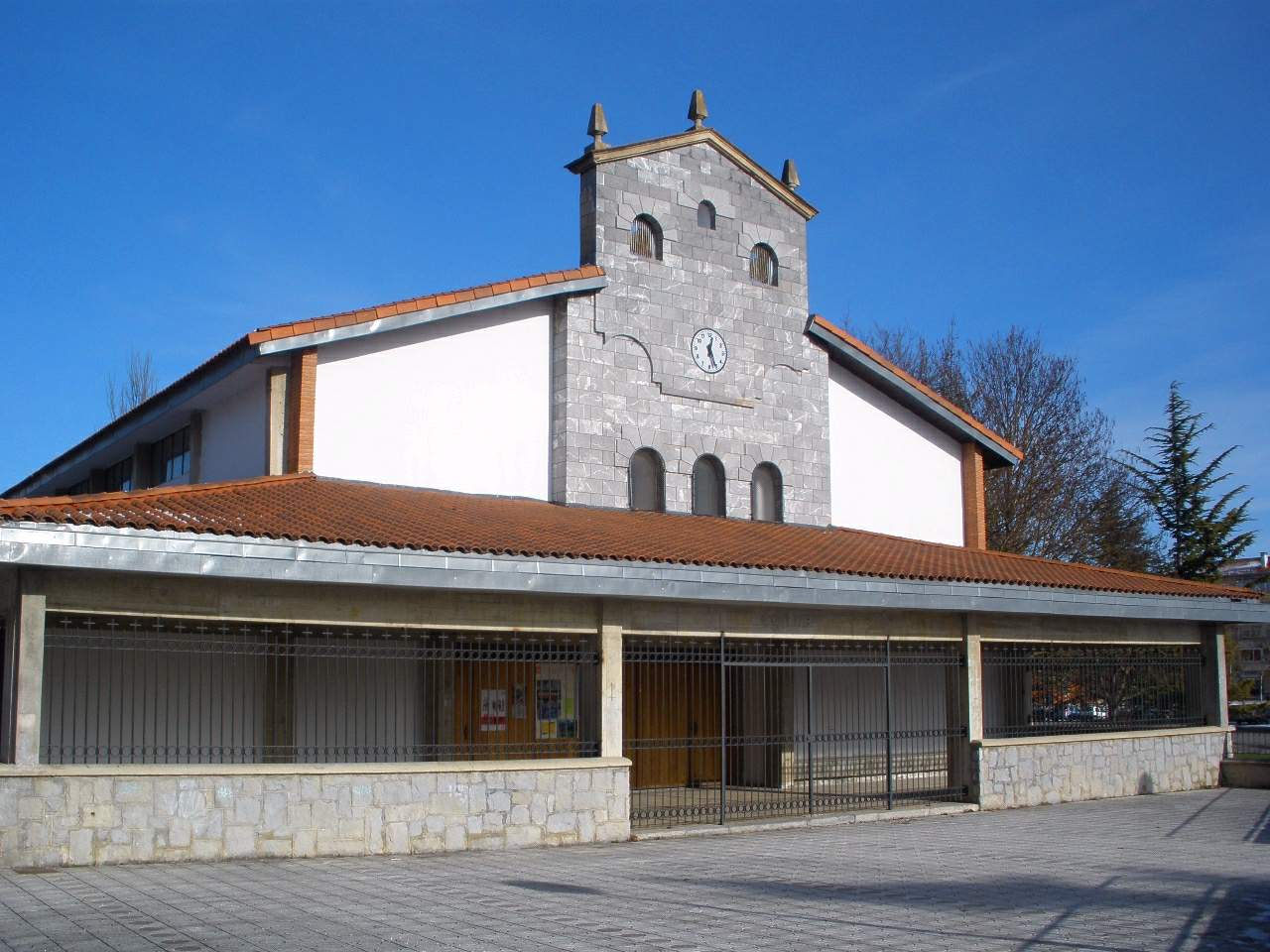
The San José Obrero parish church.

Abetxuko was first mentioned in the Reja de San Millán of 1025, where the name is spelled Avoggoco. In 1257 and 1331 it appeared as Abuchucu. It was from the seventeenth century that the modern form, Abechuco, started to be more widely used. At first the Basque name of the village was a simple adaptation to the Basque spelling, which is the one that became official. However, in 2001 the Royal Academy of the Basque Language proposed Abetxuku as its standard Basque name.

Abetxuko became administratively linked to Vitoria-Gasteiz in the fourteenth century, when king Alfonso XI granted the city jurisdiction over it and another 41 hamlets in dispute between the city and the Brotherhood of Álava. The construction of the modern neighborhood started in 1957. The first phase consisted of single-family buildings (some built by the owners themselves), while in the second apartment blocks were built. During its first decades of existence, the neighborhood suffered from a lack of services caused its location far from the city center and across the river. The city tram was extended to the outskirts of Abetxuko in 2009, and in 2012 two more stops were added within the neighborhood. Despite the increased integration of Abetxuko into the city, most socioeconomic indicators remain lower than in the rest of Vitoria-Gasteiz and its inhabitants retain a strong local identity.

== Demography ==
Abetxuko was a small rural hamlet up to the late 1950s. The new neighborhood was populated primarily by internal immigrants, primarily from Andalusia, Castile and León and Extremadura. The population in 1964 was more than 1800 and had risen over 6000 by the late 1970s. The number of young people in the neighborhood has been in decline since the 1990s, with the population of Abetxuko having one of the highest average ages of the city. The original village still exists as a much smaller settlement.

== Landmarks ==
- The old parish church of San Miguel, built in the thirteenth century in the Romanesque style, with substantial additions from the sixteenth century (the lateral arched and vaulted chapels). It houses a sculpture of the crucified Christ which probably belonged to the Santa Catalina monastery in Badaia.
- The parish church of San José Obrero is a modern temple, opened in 1961. It was designed by architect was Ignacio Lasquiber. The chapel has an eighteenth-century Marian image from Orenin, one of the settlements abandoned during the construction of the nearby Ullíbarri-Gamboa Reservoir.
- The old bridge over the Zadorra was built in the sixteenth century, although the current structure dates from the nineteenth. It became disused after the construction of a new bridge in 2006. It was renovated between 2015 and 2017.
