= Segovia prison break =

Escape from a Spanish prison in 1976

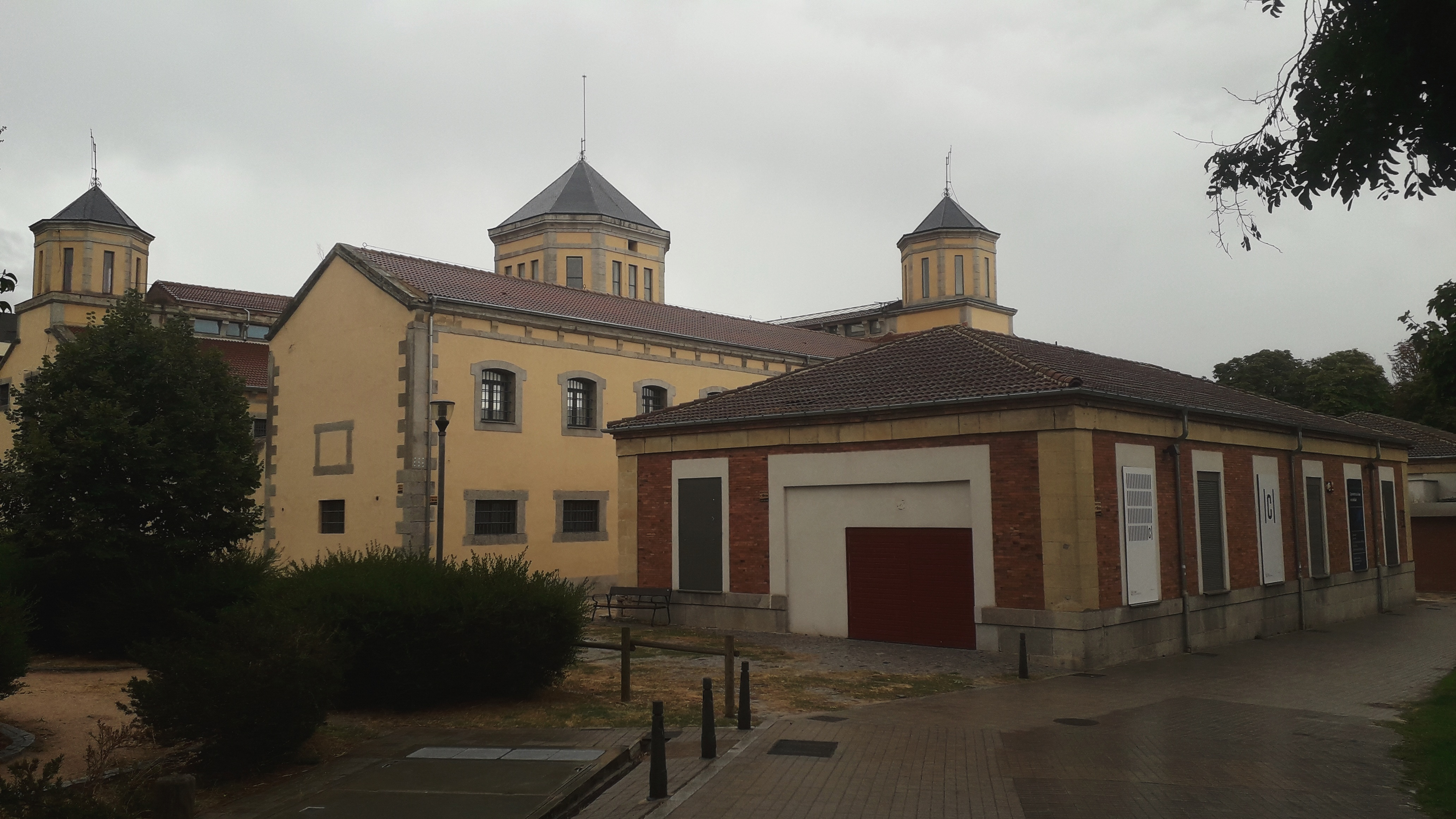
The former Segovia prison where the escape took place

The Segovia prison break (Spanish: Fuga de Segovia, Basque: Segoviako Ihesa) occurred in Segovia, Spain on 5 April 1976 when 29 political prisoners, mostly ETA militants, escaped from Segovia prison. This was the largest prison break in Spain since the Spanish Civil War. The prisoners escaped by means of tunnels they had excavated and then through the prison's drainage system. Hidden in a truck, they fled in the direction of the French border. Before reaching the border, their escape plans broke down and they found themselves stranded and lost in woodland in Navarre. Most of them were recaptured after a confrontation with Civil Guards in Aurizberri, during which one of the prisoners was shot dead. The remaining four escapees managed to cross the French border into the northern Basque Country and were detained by the French government, and subsequently released. In 1977, the Spanish authorities declared a general amnesty, after which the escapees were freed or could return to Spain.

== Background ==
In the final years of Francoist Spain, the issue of "political prisoners" had grown in importance. Numerous demonstrations in support of an amnesty for political prisoners had taken place, including a general strike in the Basque country in December 1974 and a protest on the day of the escape. Following Franco's death in October 1975, the new head of state, king Juan Carlos, signed a partial amnesty. Despite this, over 600 political prisoners remained incarcerated throughout Spain, with a substantial number of them having connections to the armed Basque separatist group ETA.

The previous most successful escape involving ETA prisoners had occurred in December 1969, when 15 political prisoners, including 10 ETA members, had escaped from Basauri prison in Biscay. The Segovia escape would be the largest escape since the Spanish Civil War and the biggest of numerous escape attempts organised by ETA.

== Planning and preparation ==
Those planning to escape learnt from Communist Party prisoners, who had been incarcerated longer, that there was a wall space which could be used in an escape attempt. Plans were made for 54 prisoners to escape on 2 August 1975, however, the escape was thwarted after an undercover agent learned of the plans.

Following that, preparations began anew. At this point, the prison contained 53 political prisoners and 7 prison guards. The number of prisoners planned to escape was reduced due to the added security following the thwarted escape and the transfer of some of the original 54 planned escapees to other prisons. Some prisoners, including senior Communist party members, declined to take part. In total, 29 prisoners took part in the escape, 25 of these belonging to ETA, with the others members of leftist armed group FRAP. In total, the prisoners had been sentenced to more than 1,500 years in prison.

Priority was given to prisoners serving longer sentences. A camera had been smuggled into the prison for the previous attempt in order to photograph the participants, so that identity documents and false passports could be prepared. Parcels containing civilian clothing had also been smuggled into the prison.

As with the August attempt, the escape was led by ETA, who carried out a detailed study of the prison to identify weak points which could be exploited in an escape. They concluded that the prison's drainage system would offer the best chance and began searching for the quickest way to reach it. Tests on the prison's walls revealed a hollow space behind the toilets and preparations for the escape attempt began in October 1975. Using a piece of metal taken from the prison's lumberyard, the prisoners removed six tiles to create a crawl space, through which they could reach the hollow space and begin tunnelling. To hide their work, they replaced the tiles and built a concealed door. Other prisoners assisted in the escape by making noise during the periods when the excavation of the tunnel was taking place.

Having spent a month working to reach the hollow space, the prisoners' work became easier due to the hidden door. Up to five prisoners took turns digging a tunnel towards the exterior of the prison. After digging for two metres they found that they had entered the drainage tunnels below the prison and sawed through the bars to reach these.

== Escape ==
At 14:00, the prisoners changed into civilian clothes and took advantage of a gap between roll calls to make their escape through the tunnel, using torches that they had made in the prison for visibility. A support unit of four people was waiting outside the prison with a truck, documents, guns and money. Deciding that the Portuguese border was too heavily policed, their plan was to escape to France, so they drove towards Pamplona. After 50 kilometres (31 mi) they changed vehicles, forcing the drivers of a trailer to drive them to Espinal at gunpoint. From there, the plan had been to cross the France–Spain border on foot, but thick fog resulted in them becoming disoriented and lost in the woodland and hilly terrain.

== Discovery and recaptures ==
At 17:45, a roll call was taken in the prison and the escape was discovered. A massive manhunt commenced, with police and Civil Guards setting up roadblocks at strategic positions.

The group of fugitives had split up and the majority were recaptured during shootouts on 6 April. In the first shootout, at 02:00, one of the fugitives was killed and one fugitive and one Civil Guard injured. The five surviving fugitives from this shootout surrendered.

At 11:00, another group of fourteen escapees became involved in a shootout with Civil Guards in Burguete, which resulted in the capture of five of them. The remainder of this group escaped to the hillside nearby, but, at 14:00, eight of the group returned to the town and asked the owner of the first house that they came upon to contact the parish priest. Through the priest's mediation, they gave themselves up to the Civil Guards. In total, twenty-one of the prisoners had been recaptured on the day after the escape.

On the morning of 8 April, another fugitive was recaptured near Agoitz. He had been wounded in the arm during one of the shootouts. With the capture of two more escapees at midday on 9 April, only four escapees remained at large.

The remaining fugitives entered a chalet near the French border and, finding it unoccupied, decided to wait there. They changed their clothes and fortified the chalet, in case the authorities should discover them there. On Saturday 9 April, a nearby chalet became occupied. The escapees considered kidnapping the occupants of this chalet and using their car but rejected the idea. They decided to wait until the owner of their chalet appeared, reasoning that, as it was Holy Week, he would use the chalet soon. They seized him when he arrived on 12 April and asked him to drive them to Pamplona, but he refused. On Maundy Thursday, 15 April, they tied him up, gave him some money for his inconvenience and used his car to drive to Pamplona and crossed the border to France from there. They presented themselves at The Office of Stateless Refugees in Paris on 29 April. They were interned on the Island of Yeu. On 9 June 1976 they escaped from Yeu, releasing a communique stating that, as they felt they had exhausted all legal routes to regain their freedom, they felt this was the only alternative left to them.

Those who had been detained in Spain were taken to Pamplona, from where they were dispersed to prisons in southern Spain. In March, May and October 1977, a series of laws led to the release of remaining political prisoners.

== In popular culture ==
Ángel Amigo, one of the 29 participants, wrote a book, Operación Poncho, detailing the escape. In 1981, Imanol Uribe adapted the book into a film, La fuga de Segovia, which won the critic's award for best film at the 1982 San Sebastián International Film Festival. The film was a box-office hit in the Basque Country over Star Wars and Superman.
