= Ab Asturica Burdigalam =

- Type: Roman road
- Location: Roman provinces of Hispania and Aquitania, from Asturica Augusta (Astorga) to Burdigala (Bordeaux)

History
- Built by: Roman Empire

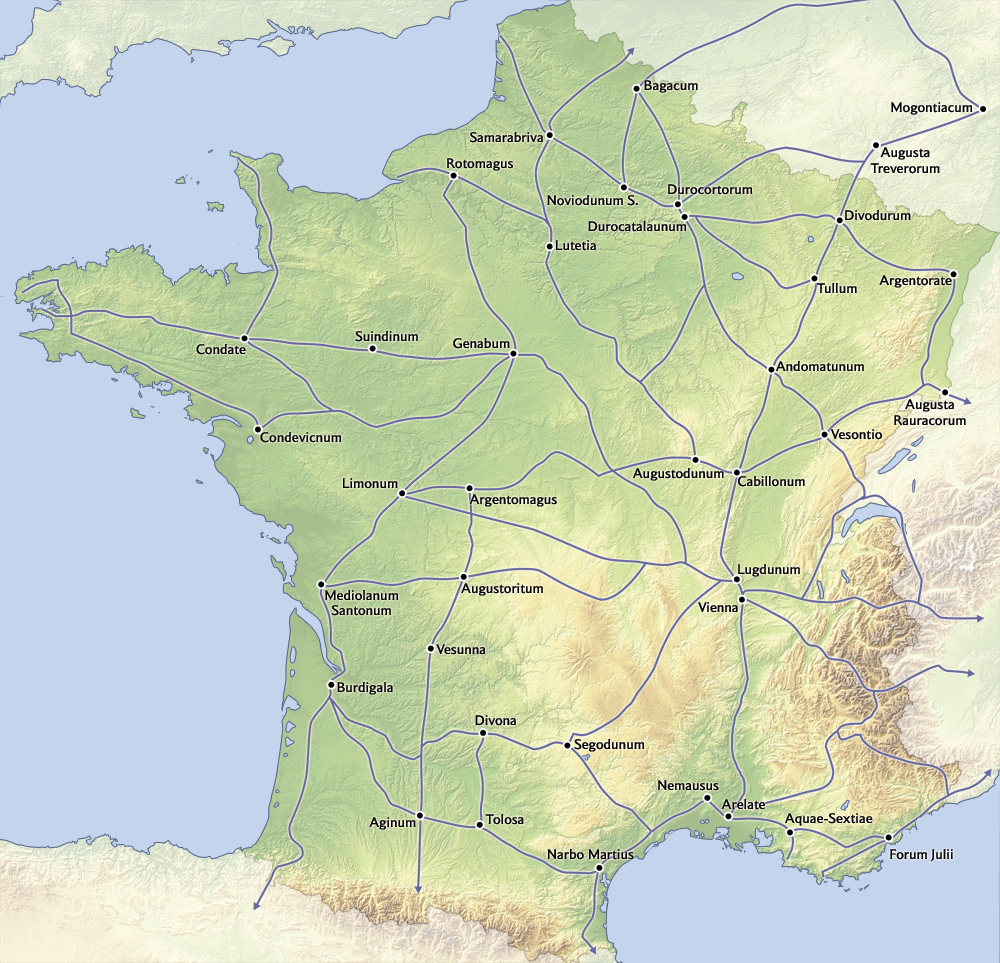
Roman roads in Gallia

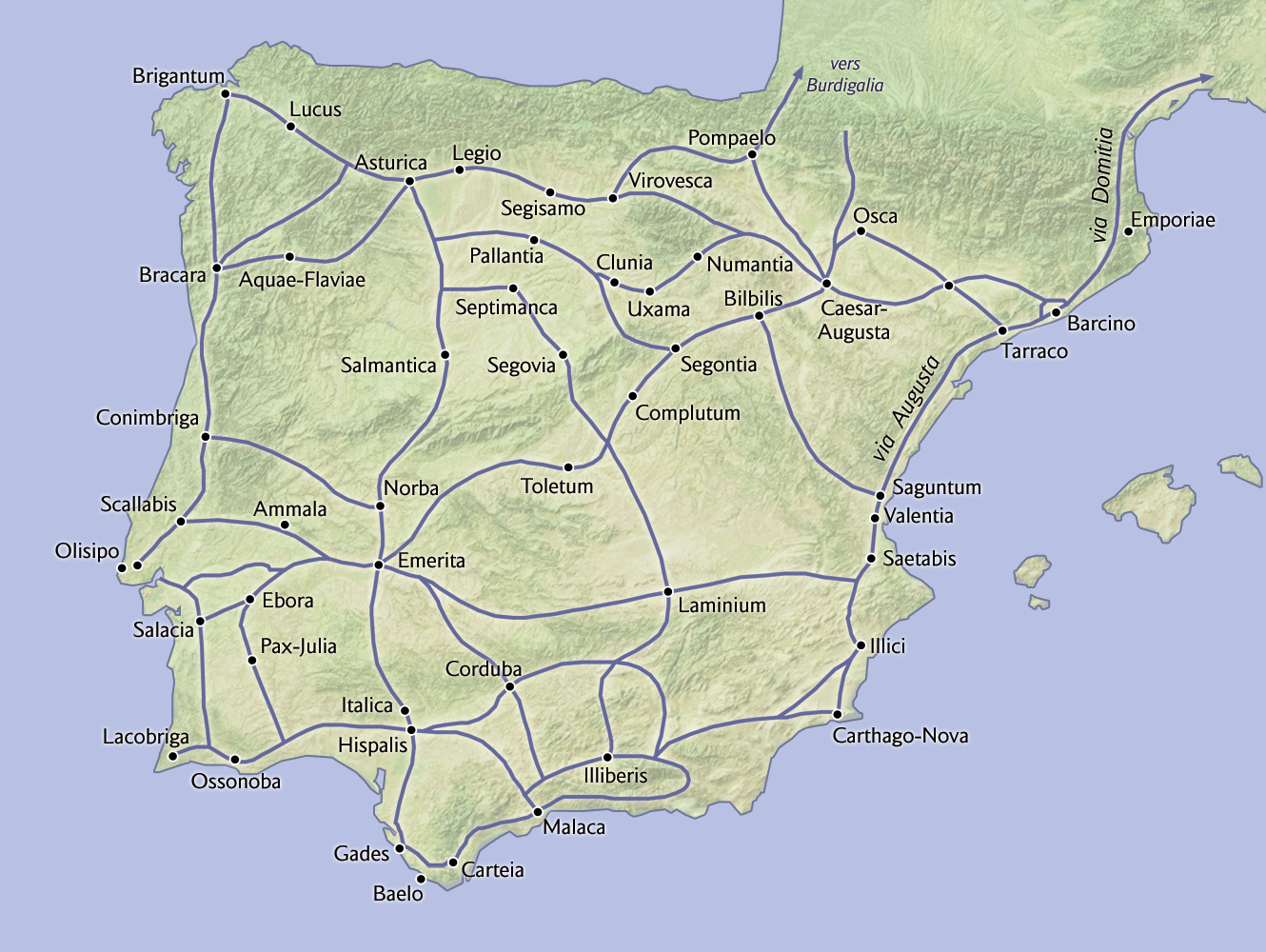
Roman roads in Hispania

Ab Asturica Burdigalam (numbered as Via XXXIV on the Antonine Itinerary) was a Roman road that linked the towns of Asturica Augusta (modern Astorga) in Gallaecia and Burdigala (modern Bordeaux) in Aquitania.

The Antonine Itinerary mentions that it ran through Pallantia (Palencia), the pass of Vindeleia, Veleia, Pompaelo (Pamplona), Iturissa (Identified by some as Aurizberri/Espinal, and others as Burguete – Auritz) and the Summo Pyreneo (Roncevaux pass), among other places.

In medieval times it would be largely replaced by the Way of St. James that, while coincident in some parts with the Roman road, it goes further south between Pamplona and Astorga.

This route was probably followed by the Vandals, Alans and Suebi when they invaded Hispania in the 5th century, and with certainty by Charlemagne and other less famed Frankish expeditions against Pamplona. The Basque section of the road was still in use when Napoleon invaded Spain between 1808 and 1814 and was known for a time as the "Route of Napoleon".

== See also ==
- Via XXXI
