= Iturissa =

Iturissa was a Roman town in north-west Spain in the province of Hispania Tarraconensis, now the province and autonomous community of Navarre. Iturissa was mentioned by Ptolemy in the second century as "a town of the Vascones."

The name Iturissa is the latinization of a Basque word Iturritza, meaning source or spring.

It was mentioned in the Antonine Itinerary as the location of a mansio on the road Ab Asturica Burdigalam, which ran from Asturica Augusta to Burdigala, but has been variously located. The town was inhabited between the first and fourth centuries AD, at which time it was abandoned.

It is located on what is called the bidezarra (old road), which is an abandoned bypass off the current Camino de Santiago, which mostly follows the route of the Roman road.

In 2011, X-ray photography and excavations definitively placed Iturissa near the present-day community of Burguete – Auritz. Archaeological excavations by the Museum of London Archaeology (MOLA) and Aranzadi, a Basque scientific association, are ongoing as of 2020.
