= Auritz =

Auritz may refer to:

- Burguete – Auritz ("Burguete" in Castilian, "Auritz" in Basque), a town and municipality located in the province and autonomous community of Navarre, northern Spain
- Auritz (Bautzen) ("Auritz" in German, "Wuricy" in Upper Sorbian), a village located in southeastern Bautzen, Germany
