= Sobalvarro =

Sobalvarro/Sobalbarro is a surname with known origins in the Iberian Peninsula. The first record of the name appears in the Basque regions of Spain. The name was purportedly constructed by combining the family name of Soba with the newly given Christian name, Alvarro.

Land mark history includes the "Valle de Soba" in Cantabria, Spain.

The name appears between the 11th and 14th centuries in the northern Spanish region of Roncesvalles. References to the family name appear with increasing frequency from the 15th to the 19th century, especially in regards to the negotiation with the French in the Treaty of Devolutionin 1662.

== Shield ==
The family shield, a silver sword on a red background, indicates the name is of military origin and proven valor. Many such shields were awarded to families for their heroic involvement in acts of war. On the coat of arms, red represents strength, power, and a fervent love to God and fellow man. The silver sword represents proven acts of valor in the battlefield.

== History ==
=== Ancient history ===
The Sobalvarro surname first appeared in the Basque regions of Spain. Because the Basque were the last remnants of the older Western Europe, the last name became known when there was conflict inside of Spain. The Basque tribes were mentioned by Strabo and Pliny as early as the 2nd century B.C. Stories of heroic acts by Sobalvarros are told by the Vascones and the Aquitani in the languages of Aquitaine, Basque, and Iruña-Veleia. These languages were already present in the area when the tribes began to migrate to the north-west from southern and southwestern present-day Europe.

=== Middle Ages ===
The name survived the Middle Ages even when Muslims and Franks fragmented the territory. Previous to this invasion, there was a coat of arms present in battles serving under the Castilian noblesse. The Sobalvarro name then began to expand within the newly formed Kingdom of Castile and Kingdom of Pamplona.

In the early to mid-15th century, influences from Aragonese, Castilian, and French neighbors began to cause feuds for the Navarre region. Once all of the feuds were settled, Navarre was eventually divided into pieces that neighboring countries and kingdoms annexed. The southernmost area that was not annexed was given as part of a treaty to France. This was the 1662 French Treaty of Devolution, during the War of Devolution, under the reign of Phillip IV. The treaty was proposed and constructed by Jean Sobalvarro. The self-governing Basque gave him the power to negotiate alongside the French to prevent the area from engaging in violence. The country continuously struggled to state its own independent country.

The surname later spread throughout France and Spain and into parts of Italy.

=== Present day ===
The surname appears in Germany, North America, and some parts of South and Central America, where it was assumed by native plantation workers on farms owned and operated by Sobalvarro families.

Currently, the largest group of Sobalvarros are found in Central American countries, specifically in Nicaragua and Costa Rica.

The second largest density is found in regions of Italy: Vicenza, Venito or Venetia. The surname migrated to this part of Europe around 12th century A.D. The third largest population is in the United States of America. The name spread from over 20 different states. First records date this surname to have emerged as early as the 18th century. The surname was legally entered through the immigration dock in Ellis Island, New York.

In Europe, the surname appears in several forms: Sobalvarro, Sobahlvarro, Sobalbarro, Svarro, Sbarro, and Sobarro. This is due to the difference in pronunciation between countries.
