= Ollávarre =

Village in Álava, Spain

Ollávarre/Olabarri
- Concejo
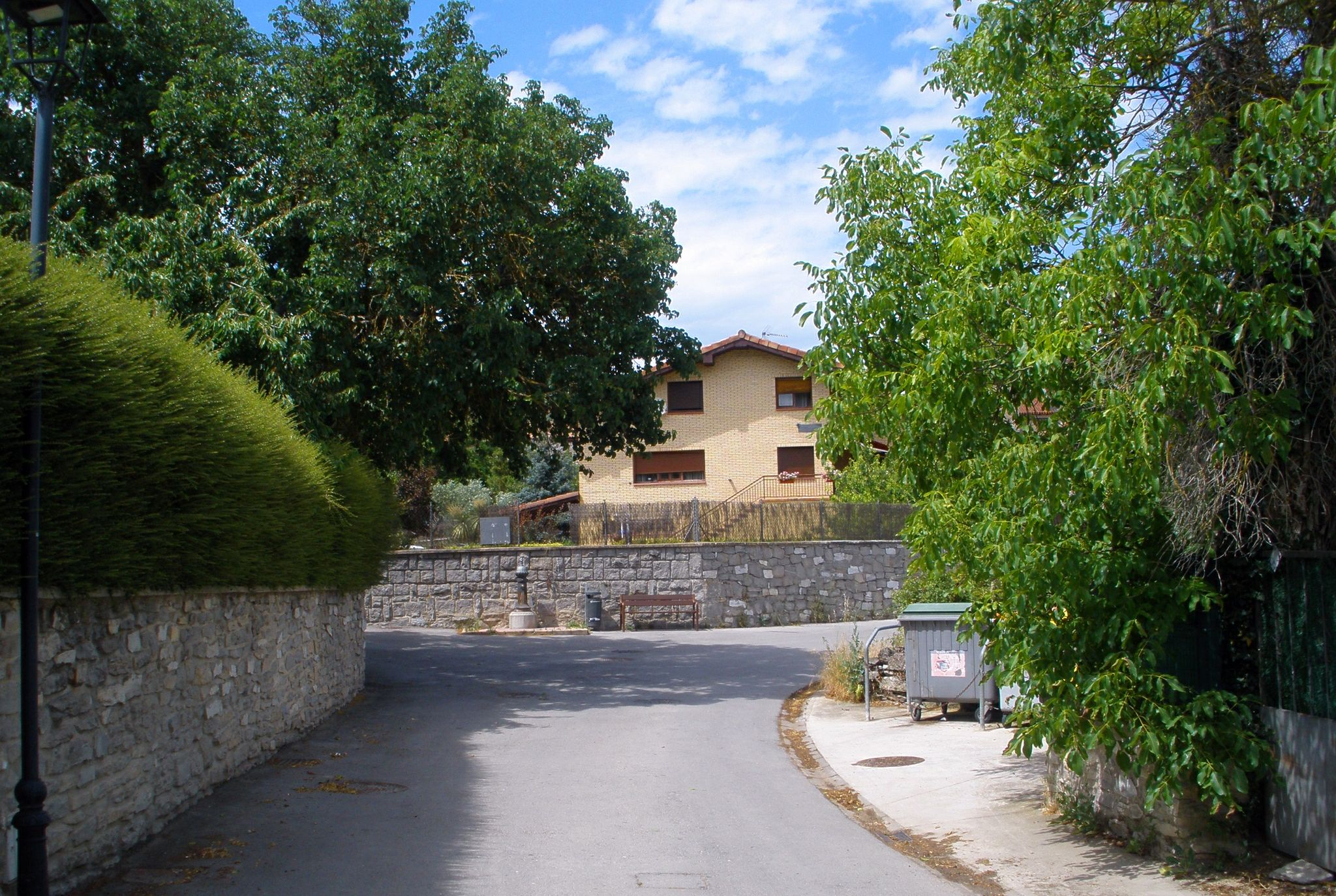
- A street in Ollávarre

- Coat of arms

- Location within Álava Location within the Basque Country Location within Spain
- Coordinates: 42°49′N 2°50′W
- Country: Spain
- Autonomous community: Basque Country
- Province: Álava
- Comarca: Añana
- Municipality: Iruña de Oca/Iruña Oka
- Elevation: 539 m (1,768 ft)

Population (2023)
  - Total: 256
- Postal code: 01428

Ollávarre (Spanish pronunciation: [oˈʝaβare]) or Olabarri (Basque pronunciation: [olaβari]) is a village and concejo in the municipality of Iruña de Oca/Iruña Oka, Álava province, Basque Country, Spain. It is located between Montevite and Nanclares de la Oca.
