= Trespuentes =

Village in Álava, Spain

- Concejo
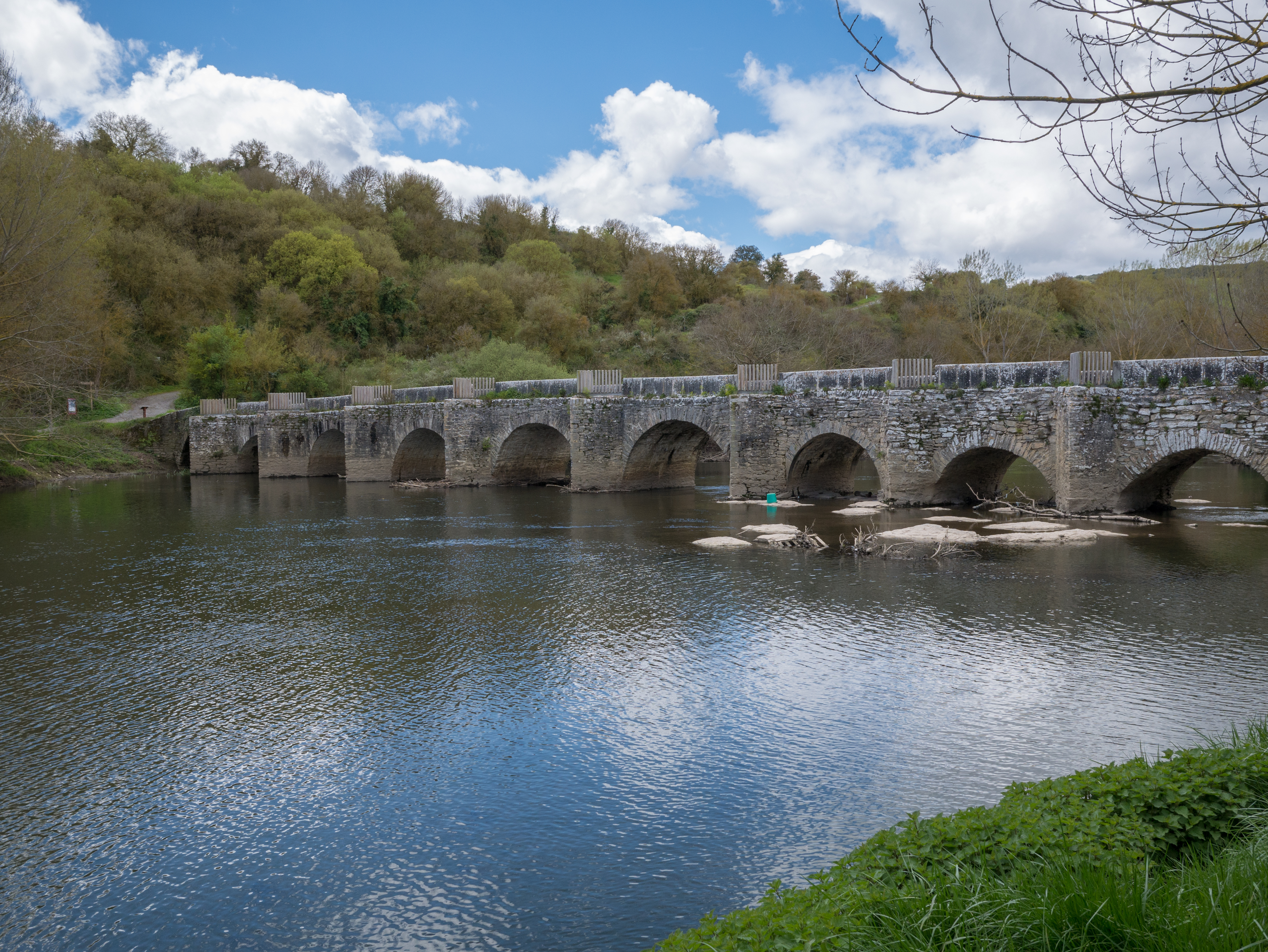
- The bridge of Trespuentes

- Coat of arms

- Location within Álava Location within the Basque Country Location within Spain
- Coordinates: 42°51′N 2°47′W
- Country: Spain
- Autonomous community: Basque Country
- Province: Álava
- Comarca: Añana
- Municipality: Iruña de Oca/Iruña Oka

Area
  - Total: 10.37 km^{2} (4.00 sq mi)
- Elevation: 503 m (1,650 ft)

Population (2023)
  - Total: 267
  - Density: 25.7/km^{2} (66.7/sq mi)
- Postal code: 01191

Trespuentes (Basque: Tresponde) is a village and concejo in the municipality of Iruña de Oca/Iruña Oka, Álava province, Basque Country, Spain. Until 1976 it was, together with neighboring Víllodas, part of the municipality of Iruña.

The village owes its name (from Latin trāns pontem 'across the bridge') to the bridge that links the village with the Roman town of Iruña-Veleia, on the other side of the Zadorra. The Botanical Garden of Santa Catalina is located near Trespuentes.
