= Botanical Garden of Santa Catalina =

Botanical garden in the Basque Country, Spain

Santa Catalina Botanical Garden
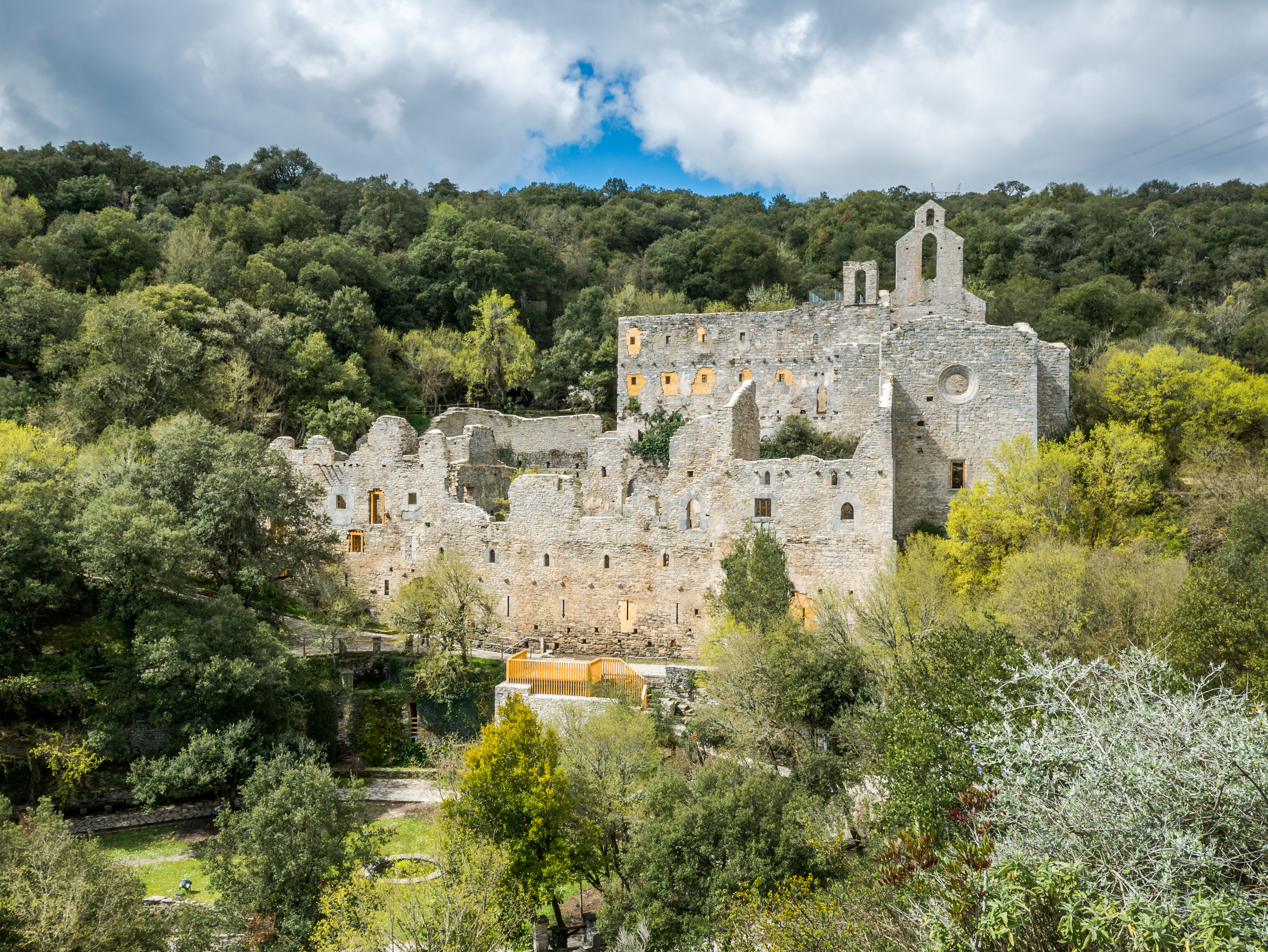
- Ruins of the convent within the garden

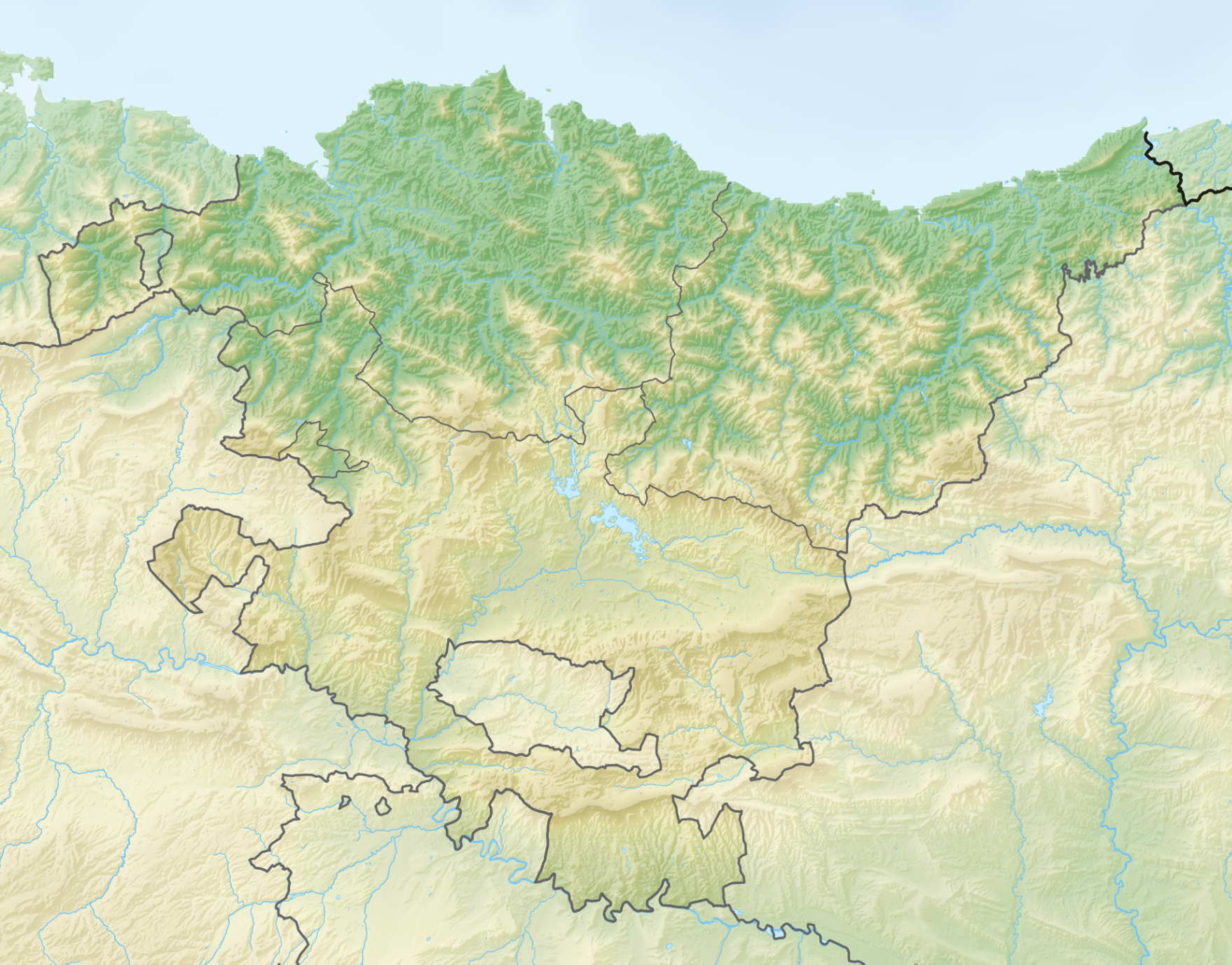
- Location within Álava Location within the Basque Country Location within Spain
- Interactive map of Santa Catalina Botanical Garden
- Type: Botanical garden
- Location: Trespuentes, Iruña de Oca, Basque Country, Spain
- Coordinates: 42°50′58″N 2°48′27″W
- Area: 3.25 ha (8.0 acres)
- Opened: 2003
- Website: http://www.jardinbotanicosantacatalina.com/

The Santa Catalina Botanical Garden (Basque: Santa Katalinako lorategi botanikoa, Spanish: Jardín botánico de Santa Catalina) is located in the municipality of Iruña de Oca, province of Álava, Basque Country, Spain. The garden is centered around the ruins of the Santa Catalina convent, located between the Zadorra river and the Badaia Range, close to Trespuentes.

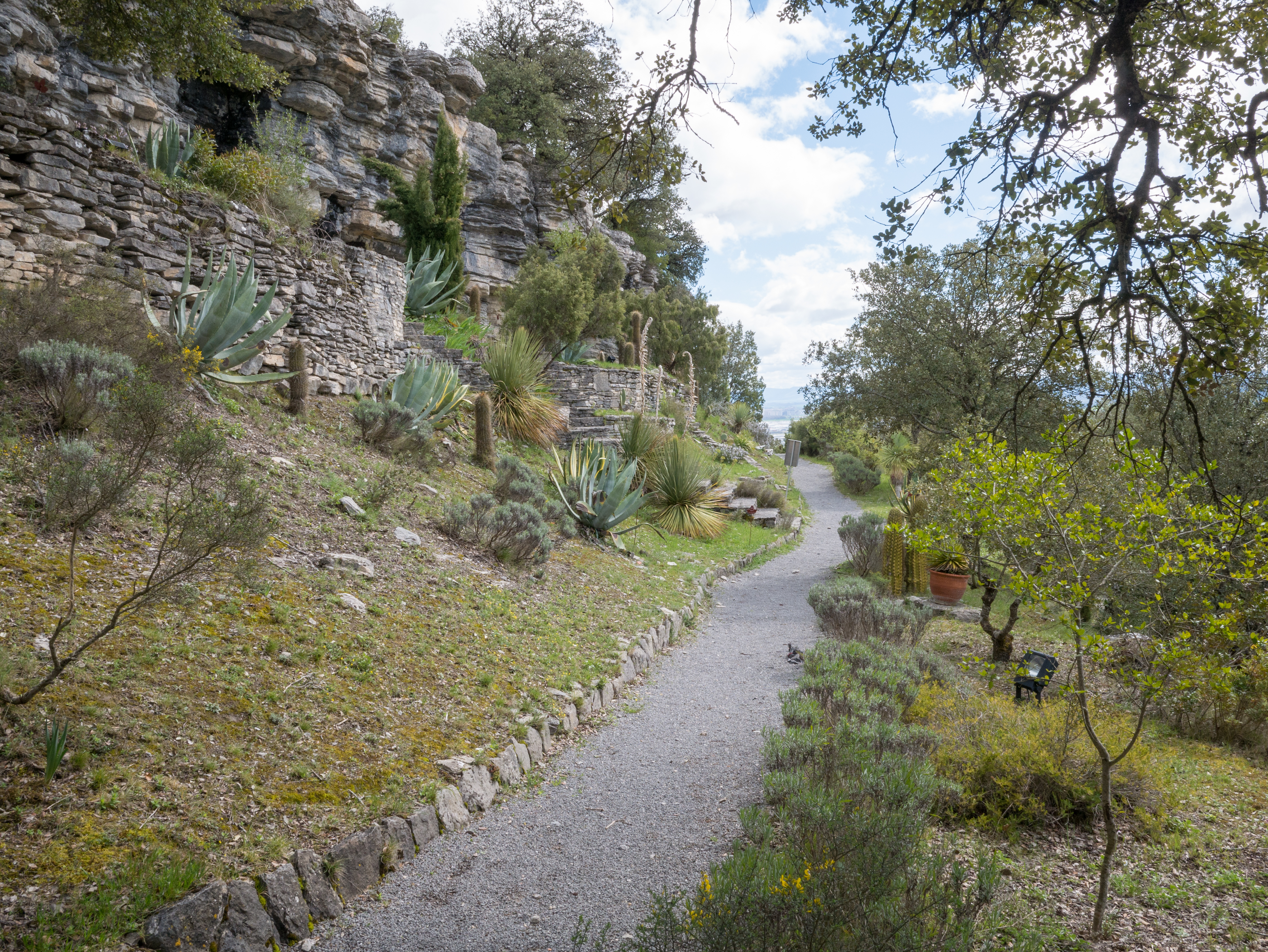
Botanical garden of Santa Catalina

== History ==
=== The origins of the botanical garden ===
The Iruña family, probably the most powerful family of Iruña de Oca, were the ones that built the tower house in the thirteenth century, a century of feudal revolts.

A century and a half later when there was peace in the area, the Iruña decided to change their place of residence and built a new building in Vitoria (now Doña Otxanda tower), and gave their former residence to the order of Hieronymites.

A few years later it was passed to the Augustinian monks, who built the monastery of Santa Catalina, and kept the old tower. In the old tower they attached a church which had its own cloister.

In 1835 with the Ecclesiastical Confiscations of Mendizábal, it was vacated by the monks. Neglect took over the premise and in the First Carlist War it was turned into a barracks for the troops of the pretender Carlos María Isidro de Borbón. After the fall of this fortress, the Carlists set it on fire and left it in ruins.

Trespuentes Botanical Garden began in 1999 as a project, and in 2003 was already a reality.

=== The Iruña family ===
The Iruña were a family of merchants who exported wool from Castile to the Netherlands. They went so far as to occupy important political positions in the city of Vitoria. Some members of the family were mayors of the city during the fifteenth century. They belonged to the political party "of the Ayala" and managed to get numerous properties in the city. The merchant Juan Martínez de Iruña, father of the also merchant Andrés Martinez de Iruña, in 1426 came to possess up to 26 houses distributed in different neighborhoods of Vitoria, an oven and 2 mills (according to the inventory of property).

The Iruña conducted a marriage strategy to improve their economic interests and family relationships with prestigious Victorian families. For example, Maria Martinez de Iruña, daughter of Juan Martinez de Iruña married Angebín Sanchez de Maturana in 1408, one of the leading families in the city of Vitoria that belonged to the political party "of the Calleja”. This marriage increased the power of the Iruña in Vitoria and in the provinces of Alava and established ties between the families, who were members of different political parties.

=== The Monastery of Santa Catalina of Badaya ===
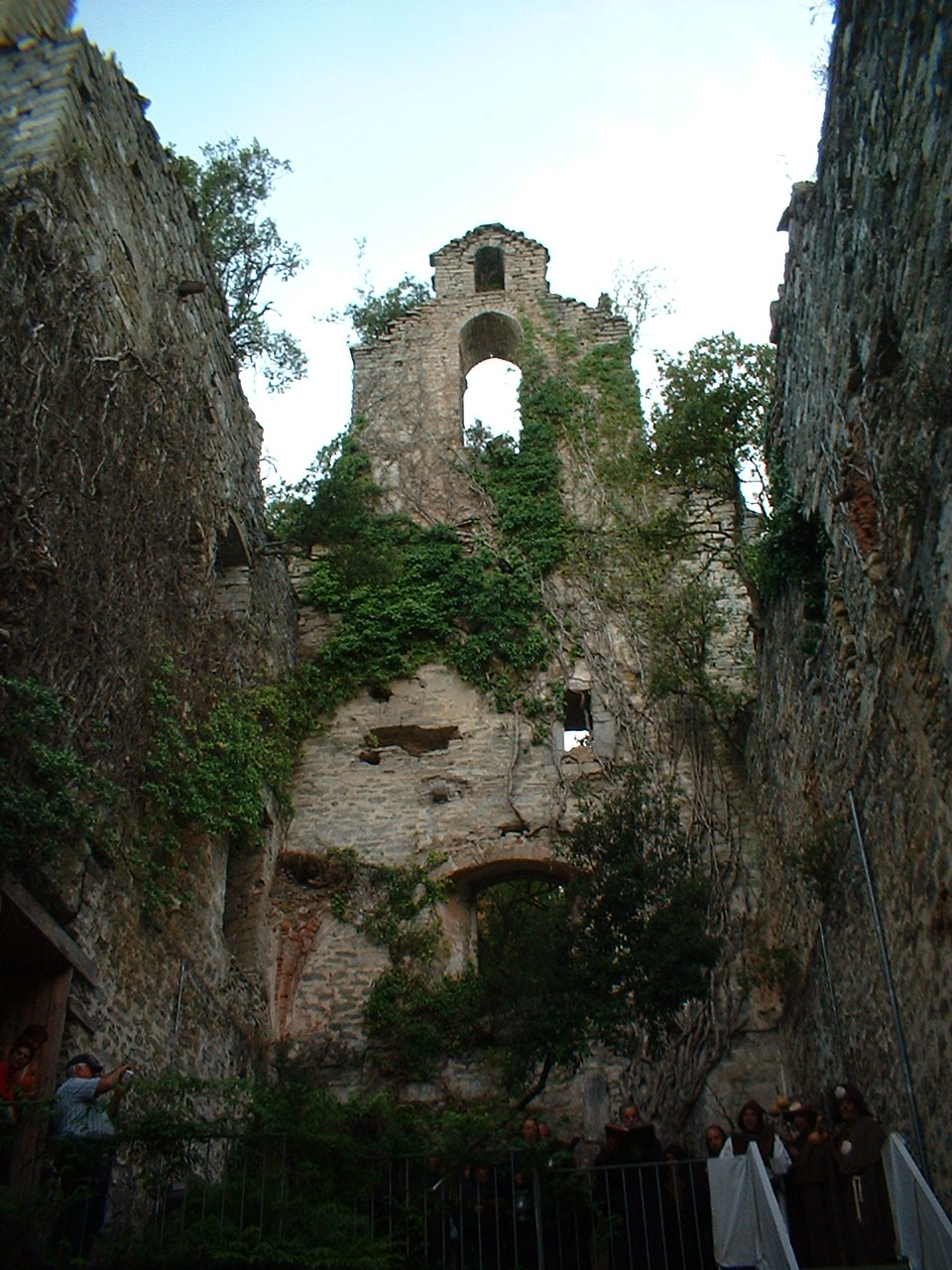
The ruins of Santa Catalina's convent

Inside the Santa Catalina Botanical Garden of Badaya there are remnants of the old convent of Santa Catalina de Badaya and of the tower house of Andrés Martínez de Iruña. This family was originally from Trespuentes and finally moved to Vitoria for their economic interests.

Fernando, bishop of Calahorra in the years 1403–1408, built the convent of the order of the Jerome monks of Santa Catalina of Badaya. The convent's restored ruins are still visible in the botanical garden of Santa Catalina of Badaya, under the rule of St. Augustín. The monastery was built from an old abandoned hermitage. This foundation was endowed with the money of the merchant Andrés Martínez de Iruña, owner of lands and of a tower house.

In 1413, Jerónimo de Quintana, prior of that monastery, sent a letter to the Pope Benedict XIII in order to request approval of its founding. The Pope approved and let the prior to build the new Jerome Monastery, giving several measures to consolidate this new monastic center. He gave different indulgences to those who contributed financially to the construction of the convent. Moreover, he allowed two friars of the convent to act as confessors in Santa María de Badaya with pilgrims who came near.

Finally, in the middle of the fifteenth century the income obtained by the friars was not enough to keep members of the small religious community and pay the expenses incurred in maintaining the infrastructure of the convent. That is why the Jerome monks abandoned the convent and gave the ownership of the monastery to another order of monks, the San Agustin order, in 1472.

== Collections ==
The topography of this area allows three types of climatic conditions and, therefore, of flora: Mediterranean, Atlantic and mixed. It guards more than 1,200 botanical species from all five continents. There are three routes organized:

• Native Plants • Plants Eastern and Australian trees • A variety of aquatic species
