= Víllodas =

Village in Álava, Spain

Víllodas/Billoda
- Concejo
- Coat of arms

- Location within Álava Location within the Basque Country Location within Spain
- Coordinates: 42°49′55″N 2°47′11″W
- Country: Spain
- Autonomous community: Basque Country
- Province: Álava
- Comarca: Añana
- Municipality: Iruña de Oca/Iruña Oka

Area
  - Total: 8.09 km^{2} (3.12 sq mi)
- Elevation: 528 m (1,732 ft)

Population (2023)
  - Total: 306
  - Density: 37.8/km^{2} (98.0/sq mi)
- Postal code: 01195

Víllodas (Spanish pronunciation: [ˈbiʝoðas]) or Billoda (Basque pronunciation: [biʎoða]) is a village and concejo in the municipality of Iruña de Oca/Iruña Oka, Álava province, Basque Country, Spain. Until 1976 it was, together with neighboring Trespuentes, part of the municipality of Iruña.
