= Adanna =

Given name

- Gender: Female
- Language: Igbo

Origin
- Meaning: father’s first daughter
- Region of origin: Igboland

Other names
- Short form: Ada
- Related names: Adannaya

Adanna audio is a female name traditionally used by the Igbo people from the southeastern region of Nigeria. It's translated as “father's first daughter”. It is also regarded as a short form of Adannaya which means “her father's first daughter”.

== Notable people with this name ==
- Adanna Nwaneri (Born 1975), Nigerian footballer
- Adanna Steinacker (Born 1988), Nigerian medical doctor and entrepreneur
