= Badaia Range =

Mountain range in Spain

Badaia
- Badaya (Spanish)
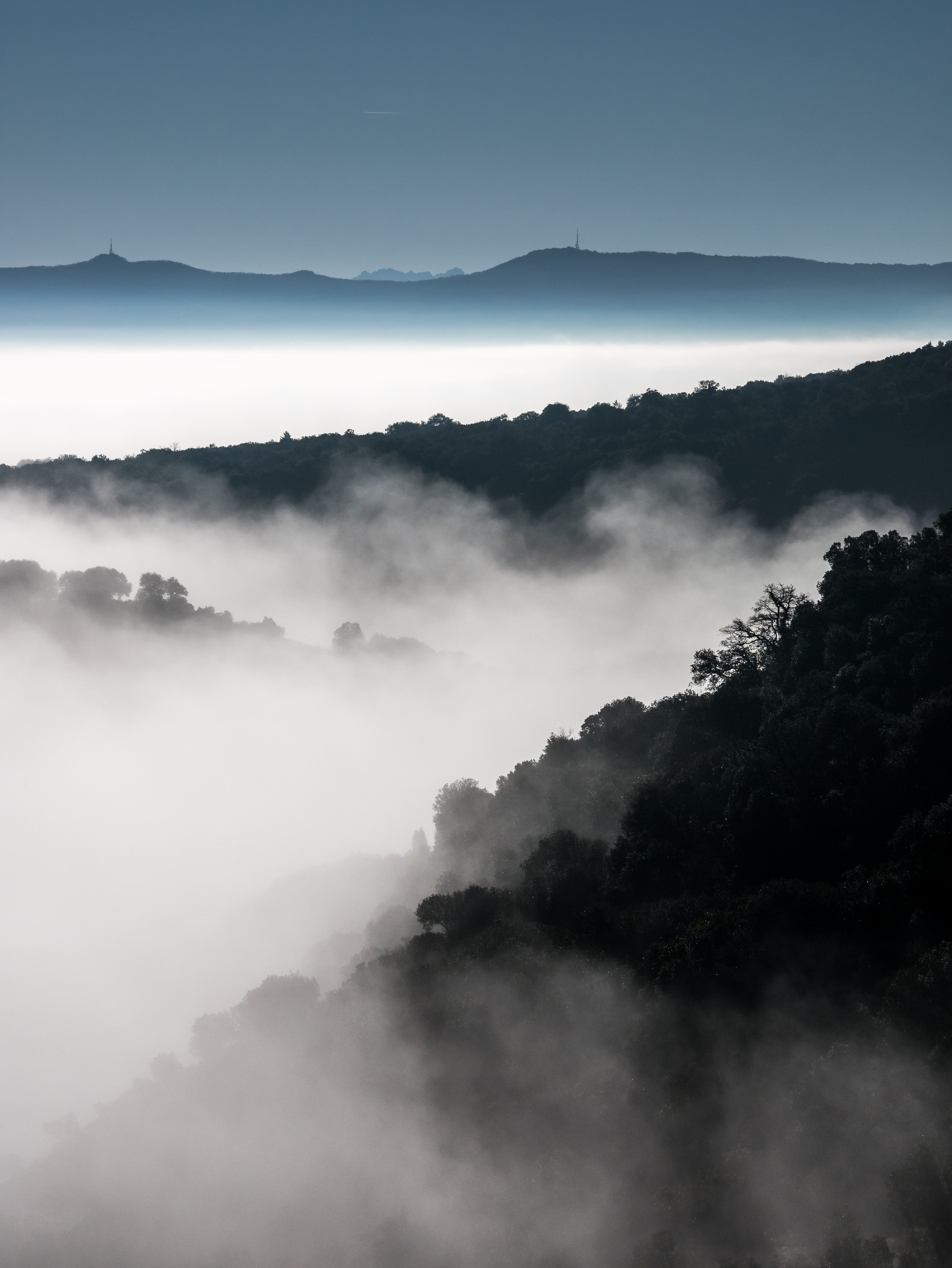
- Fog at the Badaia mountain range

Highest point
- Peak: Oteros
- Elevation: 1,038 m (3,406 ft)
- Coordinates: 42°50′46″N 02°51′38″W

Geography
- Country: Spain
- Autonomous community: Basque Country
- Province: Álava

Badaia (Basque pronunciation: [baðai.a]) or Badaya (Spanish pronunciation: [baˈðaʝa]) is a mountain range of the Basque Mountains, Spain; in the province of Álava. The highest summit is Oteros, with an elevation of 1,038 metres (3,406 ft). The Santa Catalina Botanical Garden is located at the foot of the range.
