= Montevite =

Hamlet in Álava, Spain

Montevite/Mandaita
- Concejo
- Coat of arms

- Location within Álava Location within the Basque Country Location within Spain
- Coordinates: 42°49′10″N 2°51′59″W
- Country: Spain
- Autonomous community: Basque Country
- Province: Álava
- Comarca: Añana
- Municipality: Iruña de Oca/Iruña Oka
- Elevation: 624 m (2,047 ft)

Population (2023)
  - Total: 65
- Postal code: 01428

Montevite (Spanish pronunciation: [monteˈβite]) or Mandaita (Basque pronunciation: [mandaita]) is a hamlet and concejo in the municipality of Iruña de Oca/Iruña Oka, Álava province, Basque Country, Spain. It was part of the municipality of Ribera Alta/Erriberagoitia until the late 19th century, when it was transferred to Nanclares de la Oca.
