= Espinal, Navarre =

Town in Spain

Espinal
- Village
- Espinal
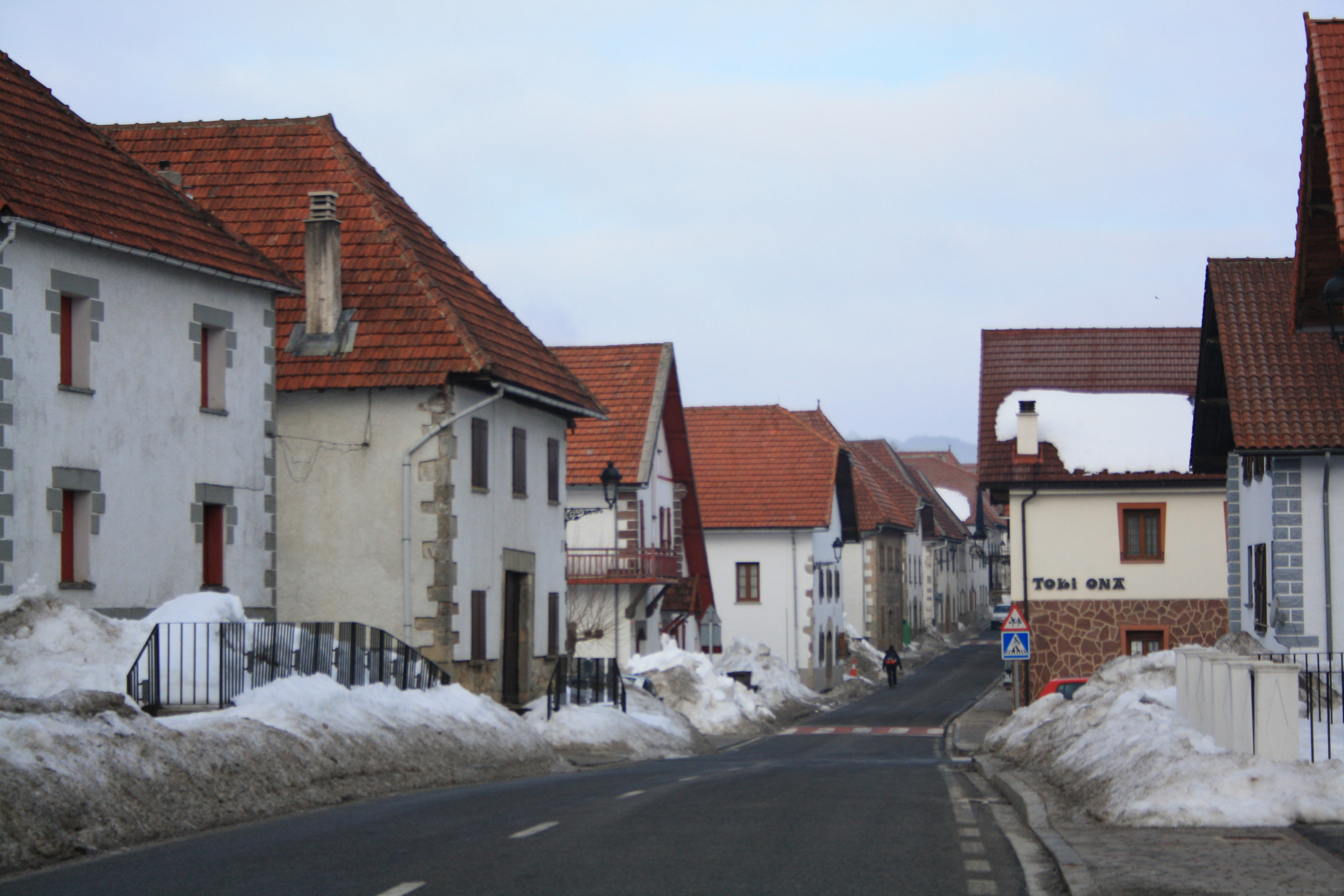
- Espinal, street scene

- Location within Navarre Location within Spain
- Coordinates: 42°58′45″N 1°22′12″W
- Country: Spain
- Autonomous Community: Navarre
- County: N/A

Population (2014)
  - Total: 243
- Time zone: UTC+1 (CET)
  - Summer (DST): UTC+2 (CEST)

Espinal (Aurizberri in Basque and, officially, Aurizberri/Espinal) is a Spanish town and council in the municipality of Erro in the Chartered (Foral) Community of Navarre. It is located in Merindad de Sangüesa, in the Auñamendi region. Its population in 2014 was 243 inhabitants. The town is located on the French way of the Camino de Santiago.
