= Iruña Oka/Iruña de Oca =

Iruña de Oca / Iruña Oka
- Municipality
- Iruña Oka (in Basque); Iruña de Oca (in Spanish)
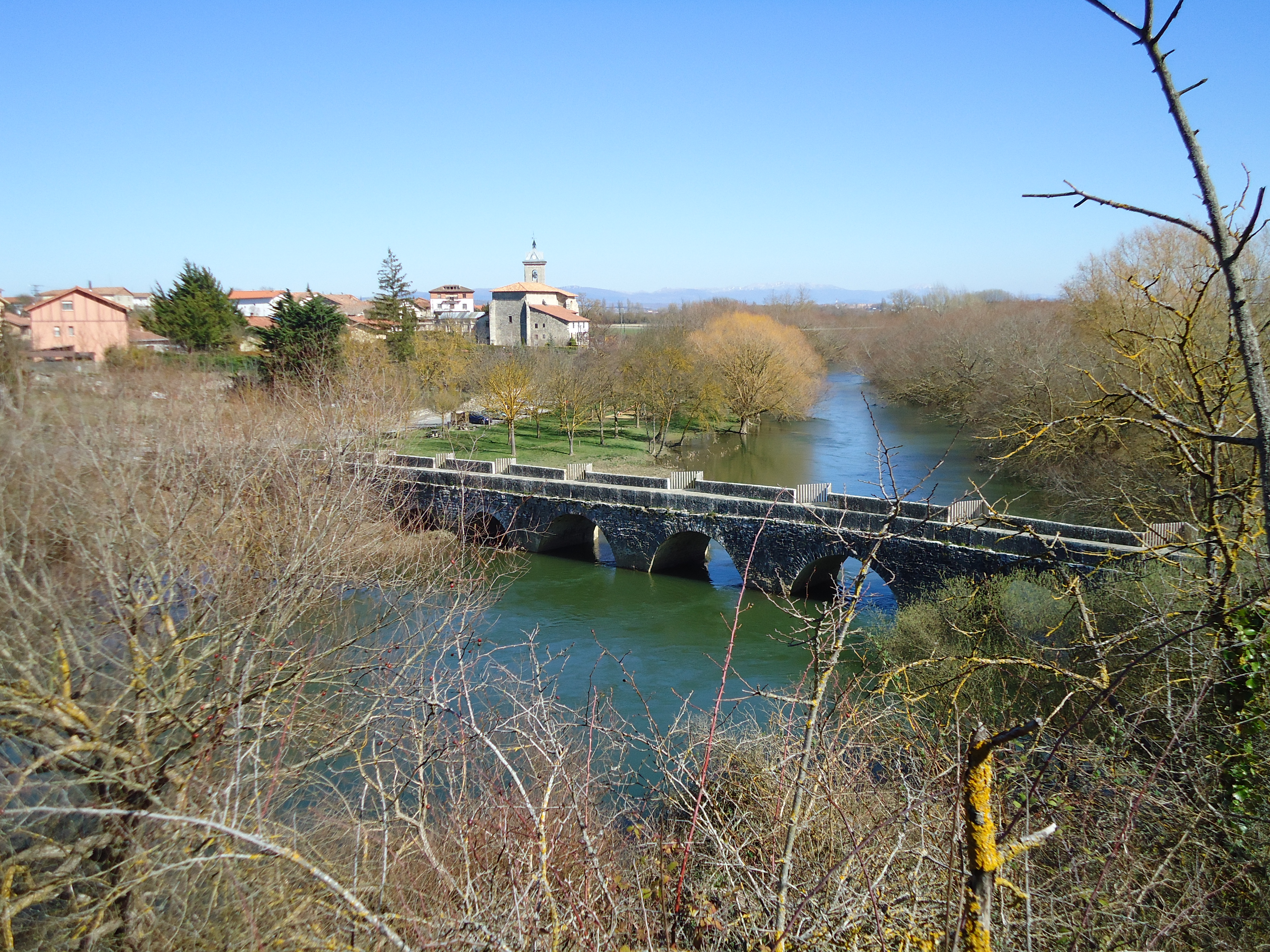

- Flag Coat of arms

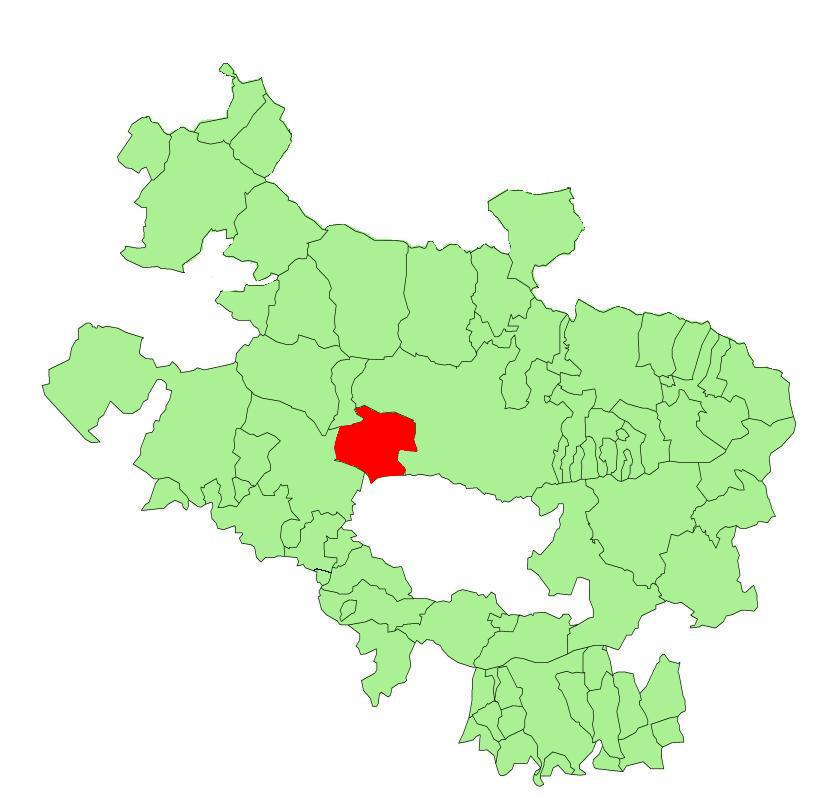
- Location of Iruña Oka in Álava

- Location of Iruña de Oca/Iruña Oka within the Basque Country Location of Iruña de Oca/Iruña Oka within Spain
- Coordinates: 42°49′09″N 2°48′46″W
- Country: Spain
- Autonomous community: Basque Country
- Province: Araba/Álava
- Eskualdea / Cuadrilla: Cuadrilla de Añana
- Founded: In 1976

Government
  - Mayor: Miguel Ángel Montes Sánchez (PSE-EE)

Area
  - Total: 53.25 km^{2} (20.56 sq mi)
- Elevation: 500 m (1,600 ft)

Population (2019)
  - Total: 3,411
  - Density: 64.06/km^{2} (165.9/sq mi)
- Demonym(s): Iruñaokar, iruñar (in Basque)
- Time zone: UTC+1 (CET)
  - Summer (DST): UTC+2 (CEST)
- Postal code: 01230
- Official language(s): Spanish, Basque
- Website: Official website

Iruña de Oca in Spanish or Iruña Oka in Basque is a municipality located in the province of Álava, in the Basque Country, northern Spain. Iruña de Oca is the most populated municipality of the Cuadrilla de Añana, one of the seven comarcas of the province, more than 35% of the people of Añana live there.

== Geography ==
The municipality was created in 1976 from the merger of the following municipalities, administratively denominated consejos:

- Nanclares de la Oca/Langraiz Oka (capital of the municipality)
- Montevite/Mandaita
- Ollávarre/Olabarri
- Víllodas/Billoda
- Trespuentes/Trasponde

Iruña de Oca is located in the central part of the Álava province, just 14 km far from Vitoria, the capital city of the Basque Country.
