= Iruña-Veleia =

Roman town in Hispania (present Basque Country, Spain)

Coordinates: 42°50′32″N 2°47′15″W

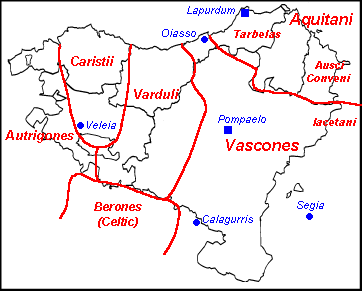
Location of Veleia and other Roman cities in the context of ancient Basque tribes and the modern Basque Country

Veleia was a Roman town in Hispania, now located in the province of Álava, Basque Autonomous Community, Spain. The site is located in the municipality of Iruña de Oca, 10 kilometers west of Vitoria. The town was an important station on the Roman road ab Asturica Burdigalam that ran parallel to the coast of the Bay of Biscay. At its apogee, the city could have been inhabited by some five to ten thousand people, and apparently went through different cycles of prosperity and decline into the Early Middle Ages until it was finally abandoned.

It has been argued (e.g. J.M.Lacarra) that the location of Iruña is actually the Victoriacum founded by Liuvigild in his campaigns against the Vascones (581), since only a very small portion of the actual town has been unearthed so far by archaeologists.

The archaeological site of Iruña-Veleia is the most important from the Roman period in the Basque Country. It was alleged to contain the oldest known texts written in the Basque language as well as, allegedly, the oldest representation of the crucifixion of Jesus found to date, but later it was said that the findings were forgeries and then the archaeologist was found guilty of fraud. Other authors favored their genuinely ancient provenance, in agreement with the stratigraphic dating performed by the archaeologists who made the discoveries.

In June 2020 the archaeologist who had made the claims, Eliseo Gil, was pronounced guilty of fraud and connivance with an external collaborator in presenting a false report. The court ruled that the pieces had been altered "by himself or through third persons with contemporary incisions to simulate that they contained inscriptions of the same ancient age as the objects in which they were engraved and that they possessed a historical and cultural value of which they were devoid". The verdict was appealed by Gil, but the appeal was dismissed. Subsequently, Gil filed an appeal to the Constitutional Court. In parallel to the court developments, a scholarly controversy on the authenticity of the inscriptions is taking place.

== Chronology ==
=== Bronze and Iron ages ===
The town was founded in the 8th century BC, in the Late Bronze Age. The houses from this period, rectangular and round with adobe walls and thatched roofs, are similar to those found at the nearby site of Atxa (Vitoria).

=== Roman period ===
In the first half of the 1st century some of these houses were replaced by others of Roman style (domus). This architectural romanization continued as the century advanced.

The late Roman city (3rd and 4th centuries) is better known. It shows signs of decay and the construction of a wall that encloses an eleven hectare area. The town survived into the 5th century after Roman power had disappeared from the region, but by the end of the century only burial plots in abandoned buildings are found.

=== Modern age ===
There was an abbey at the site at least since the 16th century whose buildings remained visible until the mid 19th century.

== Sensational findings ==
=== Developments ===
The Iruña-Veleia site had been granted 3.72 million euros funding by the Basque regional government. In 2006, a series of sensational findings at Iruña-Veleia were announced to the press by the director of the archaeological mission. However, in 2020, the director of the excavation was found guilty of fraud relating to these findings. The findings included what would have been the oldest non-onomastical texts in Basque, which were hailed as the first evidence of written Basque. Also, it was announced the discovery of a series of inscriptions and drawings on pottery fragments, some of which refer to Egyptian history and even some written in Egyptian hieroglyphs. Finally, it was announced the finding of the earliest representation of the Calvary (crucifixion of Jesus) found anywhere to date.

Eventually, a committee of experts, the "Comisión Científica Asesora" ("Scientific Advisory Committee") was constituted by the provincial government of Álava to study the findings. The committee was originally made up of nine academics, all professors of the University of the Basque Country in Vitoria, along with three members of the provincial government of Álava, the director of the Provincial Museum of Archaeology, and the director of the excavation (Eliseo Gil), and was presided by the Culture Deputy of Álava herself. Later others, although not members of the commission were consulted from Madrid, Italy and Britain. Alicia Canto, professor of classical archaeology and epigraphy at the Universidad Autónoma de Madrid, cast doubts over the capacity of such committee to elucidate the veracity of the sherd inscriptions based on linguistic grounds, as well as highlighting the contradictory positions shown by some of its members while noting that some claimed texts were "beyond salvation".

At its fifth meeting on November 19, 2008, every report except that by Gil found problems with the so-called "exceptionals". The culture deputy of Álava, Lorena Lopez de la Calle, dubbed the case the "biggest archaeological fraud in the history of the Iberian Peninsula", and demoted the chief technical official of the Archaeological Museum of Álava for her support to the authenticity of the findings. Ultimately, one of the members of the committee, Julio Núñez, became the new director of the Iruña-Veleia archaeological excavations.

=== Forgery case ===
The provincial government of Alava pursued legal actions against the alleged perpetrators of the supposed fraud. The sponsors of the project (Euskotren) also brought charges against the archaeological team, but the case was dismissed, and only the lawsuit filed by the provincial government of Alava remained in force. Eliseo Gil has repeatedly denied the accusations against him, defended the authenticity of his findings, and requested that decisive physical tests be performed on the pieces to scientifically resolve the issue.

In June 2020 Eliseo Gil, with his company Lurmen as a solidary obligor, was pronounced guilty of fraud and connivance with an external collaborator in presenting a false report. The court ruled that the pieces had been altered "by himself or through third persons with contemporary incisions to simulate that they contained inscriptions of the same ancient age as the objects in which they were engraved and that they possessed a historical and cultural value of which they were devoid". The verdict was appealed by Gil, but the appeal was dismissed. Subsequently, Gil filed an appeal to the Constitutional Court.

In August 2020, a group of 14 scientists published a letter in several Basque newspapers, warning that the so-called forgery is a scientific controversy that remains unresolved, and that "scientific issues must be resolved in scientific forums, such as scientific journals and conferences, not in courts of law". This letter was signed by prominent archaeologists, among others.

In 2025, pieces from a 1990s Las Ermitas excavation in Espejo, Álava were reexamined. The excavation had been directed by Lurmen's archeologist Idoia Filloy. The Las Ermitas remains were seized by the Alava government with all the Lurmen storage contents in Veleia and kept at the Bibat museum in Vitoria. There two archeologists cataloguing graffiti findings in the Basque Country for the Basque Government found two pottery fragments from Las Ermitas with incised graffiti featuring the words NERON and CESAR. The Basque and Alavese governments pointed out that those spellings do not match declined forms of the Latin names Nero and Caesar and claimed that some letter cuts across adhered earth. The archeologists also find suspicious that the words are neatly centered on the fragments. The authorities took those as clues of modern manipulation and submitted them to the Basque police.

=== Scholarly controversy ===
In disagreement with the opinions of some members of the Scientific Advisory Committee constituted by the Provincial Government of Alava, positing that the graffiti found at Iruña-Veleia are recent forgeries or cannot be ancient, a number of scholars in different fields, including archaeology, epigraphy, ancient history, linguistics, and Egyptology, from four countries, have made public their views favorable to their authenticity through reports, articles, books, and conference presentations. They contend that the stratigraphic dating, placing the pieces in Roman times, was correctly performed, that there are parallels of the findings in ancient times, and that the linguistic features of the Basque graffiti are compatible with known historical features of the Basque language. Linguist Joaquín Gorrochategui and epigraphist Juan Santos Yanguas, members of the Scientific Advisory Committee, have made public their arguments in support of the falsehood of the graffiti in conference proceedings, in which they contend that the graffiti show anachronistic linguistic and epigraphic features that are incompatible with an ancient date.

== See also ==
- Basque language
- Caristii
- Autrigones
- Ab Asturica Burdigalam (a Roman road that ran through Veleia).
- Glosas Emilianenses
- Hand of Irulegi for the purportedly oldest text in Basque

== Bibliography ==
- (in Basque) Barandiaran, Alberto, ''Veleia afera'', Elkar, 2010. ISBN 9788497839150
- Elkin, Mike (2009): "The Veleia Affair" Archaeology Volume 62 Number 5, September/October 2009.
- (in French) Iglesias, Hector (2009), « Les inscriptions de Veleia-Iruña » {pdf} Les inscriptions de Veleia-Iruña (version entièrement revue et augmentée d'un index alphabétique). Artxiker, bibliothèque numérique d'IKER, Centre de recherche sur la langue et les textes basques du CNRS, Baiona-Bayonne.
