= Zadorra =

River in Spain

Coordinates: 42°40′03″N 2°53′59″E

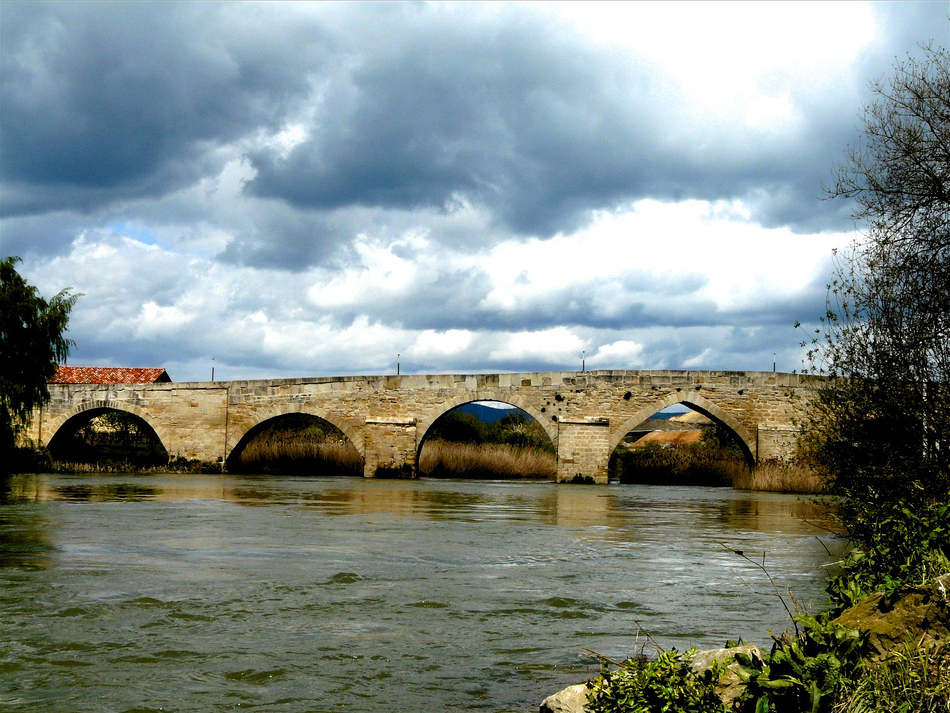
- The Zadorra at Armiñon

Location
- Country: Spain

Physical characteristics
- Source
  - location: Basque Mountains
  - elevation: 1,045 m (3,428 ft)
- Mouth
  - location: Ebro River
- Length: 78.1 km (48.5 mi)
- Basin size: 1,361.28 km^{2} (525.59 mi^{2})
- Discharge
  - average: 14.1 m^{3}/s (500 cu ft/s) (Ibisate, 2004)

Basin features
- Progression: Ebro→ Balearic Sea

The Zadorra is a river tributary of the Ebro in the Basque Country in the north of the Iberian Peninsula. The river flows primarily across Álava province (flowing briefly through the Treviño enclave at La Puebla de Arganzón) finally reaching the Ebro near Miranda de Ebro in Burgos province, Castille and León. The river's water volume is the largest in Álava, with its basin being the most extensive in the province. Nowadays it provides by means of the Zadorra Reservoir System (comprising reservoirs Uribarri-Ganboa, Urrunaga and Albina) water supply for Vitoria and half of the Basque Autonomous Community.

The river rises in the slopes of the Entzia Plateau at the spring known as Los Corrales (municipality of San Millán/Donemiliaga), meandering thereafter across the Alavan Plains to the west (loops around Agurain/Salvatierra) past Vitoria by the north, where it takes a turn to the south heading to the Ebro through La Puebla de Arganzón.

== Landmarks ==
- The village and iconic castle of Gebara sit by the river on its middle stage.
- The Zadorra Reservoir System starting in Uribarri-Ganboa (built as of 1947).
- The Battle of Vitoria took place on a stretch extending 18 kilometres (11 mi) on the banks of Zadorra from La Puebla de Arganzon to Trespuentes to Mendoza.
- The site of old Basque-Roman town Iruña-Veleia is across the river from Trespuentes.

== Pollution ==
The Zadorra is the most important river in Álava and is also the most polluted. It ranks in the top six polluted rivers in the Basque Country.

More than 2,754 waste disposals have been authorised, 1,783 (65%) of which are urban and 960 (35%) of to which are industrial. From the 960 industries 89 of them are subject integrated environmental authorization. Unauthorized waste disposal also must be taken into account for the pollution. Additionally, waste dumped by industries is often more polluted than it should be.

The oxygen levels in the Zadorra are below the standards required for the wildlife in the river. The river's situation is also aggravated by the presence of toxins. The level of toxins is above the amount allowed by the European Union. Fifteen wastewater treatment plants have helped stopping the advance of the pollution in the river. The kind of insects that nest in the river are an indicator of the degradation of the Zadorra. Because the insects show in the top of the river what is happening in the bottom of it. In addition, nitrates have appeared in the river, despite the amount of nitrates being low, there should not be any nitrates.

In 2008 the Ebro's hydrographic confederation published a report about some of the rivers around the Ebro, including the Zadorra river. The investigation, which measured pollution in the rivers over four years, started in 2004. The report showed that the amount of pollution found in the river was well over the permitted amount. As a result, the municipalities have started some control programmes for the authorization of waste disposal. The control programmes have brought about some reduction in pollution.
