= Burguete – Auritz =

Municipality in Navarre, Spain

Auritz / Burguete
- municipality
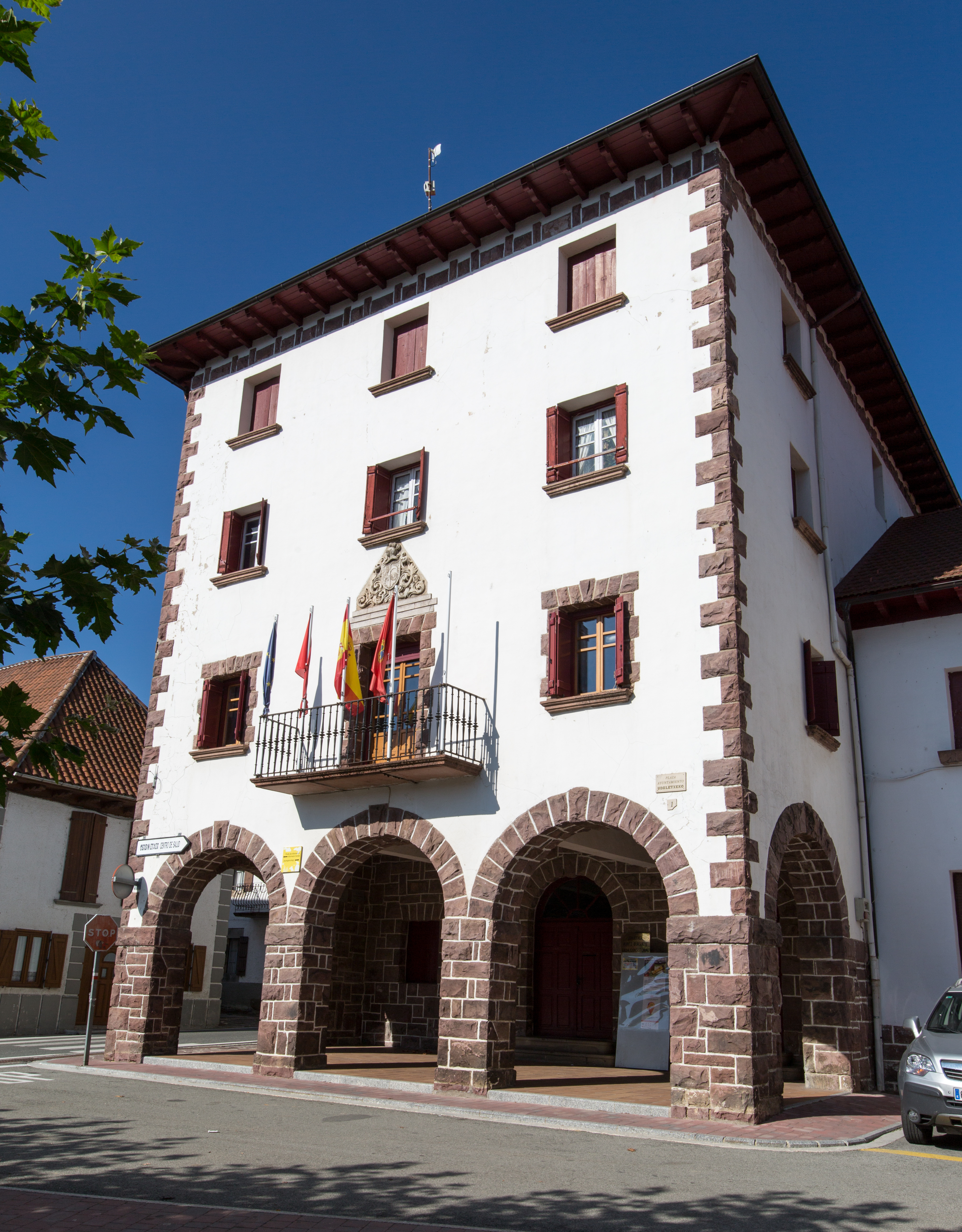
- Town hall

- Flag Coat of arms

- Location within Spain Location within Navarre
- Coordinates: 42°59′27″N 1°20′05″W
- Country: Spain
- Autonomous community: Navarre

Area
  - Total: 19.19 km^{2} (7.41 sq mi)
- Elevation: 894 m (2,933 ft)

Population (2021)
  - Total: 228
  - Density: 11.9/km^{2} (30.8/sq mi)
- Demonyms: Castilian: burguetano, -a; Basque: auriztarra
- Postal code: 31640
- Area code: 948
- Website: www.burguete.es

Burguete (Castilian) or Auritz (Basque) is a town and municipality located in the province and autonomous community of Navarre, northern Spain.

Ernest Hemingway lodged in Burguete in 1924 and 1925 for a fishing trip to the Irati river, and describes it in his novel The Sun Also Rises.
