= Aberasturi (disambiguation) =

Aberásturi is a hamlet and concejo in the municipality of Vitoria-Gasteiz, in Álava province, Basque Country, Spain.

Aberasturi may also refer to:

- Amaia Aberasturi (born 1997), Spanish actress
- Jon Aberasturi (born 1989), Basque cyclist
