= Ramón María de Urbina, 2nd Marquess of la Alameda =

Spanish politician and nobleman

Ramón María de Urbina
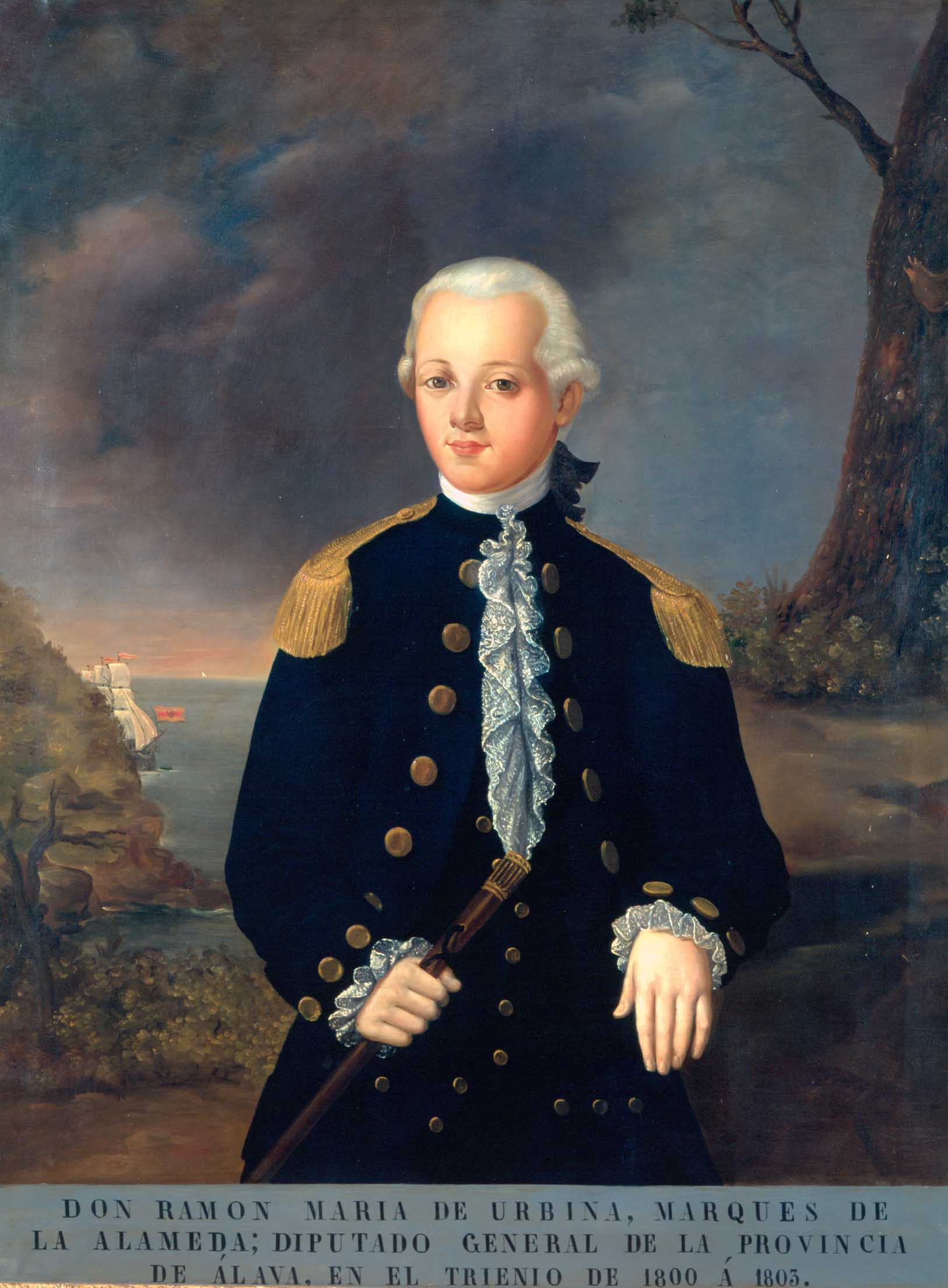
- Portrait by Pablo Bausac

Deputy General of Álava
- In office 1800–1803
- Preceded by: Ortuño María de Aguirre
- Succeeded by: José Joaquín de Salazar

Mayor of Vitoria
- In office 1796–?
- In office 1781–?

Personal details
- Born: 2 September 1751 Pamplona, Spain
- Died: 5 December 1824 (aged 73) Vitoria, Spain
- Spouses: María Mercedes Ferraz y Pereda (m. 1787, died); Manuela de Salazar y Sánchez de Samaniego (m. 1796)

Military service
- Years of service: 1762–1775
- Rank: Captain

Ramón María de Urbina y Gaytán de Ayala, 2nd Marquess of la Alameda (2 September 1751 – 5 December 1824) was a Spanish politician and nobleman. He served as mayor of Vitoria and as Deputy General of Álava.

== Biography ==
He was born in Pamplona, the son of a military officer from Vitoria and a Gipuzkoan aristocrat. His paternal grandfather, Bartolomé Ortiz de Urbina, served as Deputy General from 1764 to 1767. He studied in France and had a brief military career which ended in 1775. He was the sole heir to his grandfather when he died in 1775, as his father had died the year before. A member of the Real Sociedad Bascongada de Amigos del País, he was a prominent member of the city's cultural elite in the late 18th century. He was named mayor of Vitoria in 1781 and 1796. During his tenures as mayor, he promoted several public works which were aimed at modernizing the city according to Enlightenment ideas. The most notable of these were the Plaza Nueva and Los Arquillos, both designed by architect Justo Antonio de Olaguibel, which remain prominent landmarks of the city.

He was elected Deputy General of Álava in 1800, at the time of Manuel Godoy's return to power in Spain. During this time, tensions increased between the central government and the Basque provinces over fiscal issues. In Vitoria, the tensions reached their highest point on 24 February 1803 with the Módenes Riots (Spanish: Revuelta de Módenes). The revolt lasted for a single day and didn't result in any casualties, but it prompted the Spanish authorities to take action. His efforts to negotiate with officials close to Godoy (which included bribes) were unsuccessful, and the authorities of Álava under his successor were forced to accept the sole authority of the Spanish government regarding smuggling.

In 1810, after the abolition of the fueros by the French-installed authorities, he was named to the governing council of Biscay. After the end of the Peninsular War, his palace was attacked with stones by an absolutist mob which targeted pro-French personalities. It is likely that his relative Luis María Salazar, who had opposed the French, protected him from reprisals by the authorities.

In 1787, he married Mercedes Ferraz Pareda, the daughter of a military officer. After her death, he married Manuela de Salazar. He had a daughter from his second marriage, Teotiste María de Urbina. She married Íñigo Ortés de Velasco, who would go on to serve as Deputy General.
