= Fausto Íñiguez de Betolaza =

Spanish architect (1849–1924)

- Born: 21 February 1849; Vitoria, Álava, Spain
- Died: 19 January 1924 (aged 74); Vitoria, Álava, Spain
- Education: School of Architecture of Madrid
- Occupation: Architect
- Years active: 1877–1917

Fausto Íñiguez de Betolaza Sáez de Asteasu (21 February 1849 – 19 January 1924) was a Spanish architect. He has been described as the most important architect in Álava together with Justo Antonio de Olaguibel.

== Biography ==
Fausto Íñiguez de Betolaza was born in Vitoria to a bourgeois family. His father, Severo, was an important local businessman. He graduated from the School of Architecture of Madrid in 1877. From 1889 to 1914 he served as the Diocesan Architect of Vitoria, and thus was involved in the construction and restoration of numerous religious buildings in the province of Álava. From 1891 to 1914 he also served as the Provincial Architect of Álava. He also held various municipal positions and had an important role in the founding of the Escuela de Artes y Oficios in 1891. Íñiguez de Betolaza died at his home in 1924.

== Works ==
His first major work after graduating was the Convent of the Carmelites, designed in 1878 in a French Gothic Revival style. In 1885 he directed the works of the Monastery of the Visitation of Saint Mary, originally designed by Cristóbal Lecumberri. In the Church of El Carmen, built from 1889 to 1890, he shifted from Gothic Revival to eclecticism. His Chapel of the Sagrada Familia of 1905 is one of the most important examples of eclectic architecture in the Basque Country, at around the same time he also designed the new Bridgettine convent in Vitoria. During the late 19th century he also built and reformed numerous residential and service buildings, including the Palace of Montehermoso. He also designed the Azucarera Alavesa factory, built in 1901. Starting in the early 20th century Íñiguez de Betolaza abandoned eclecticism and adopted a style influenced by Viennese Modernism and Art Nouveau. During his later years he also adopted the neo-Basque style.
