= Convento de las Brígidas, Vitoria-Gasteiz =

Convent in Vitoria-Gasteiz, Spain

Convento de las Brígidas
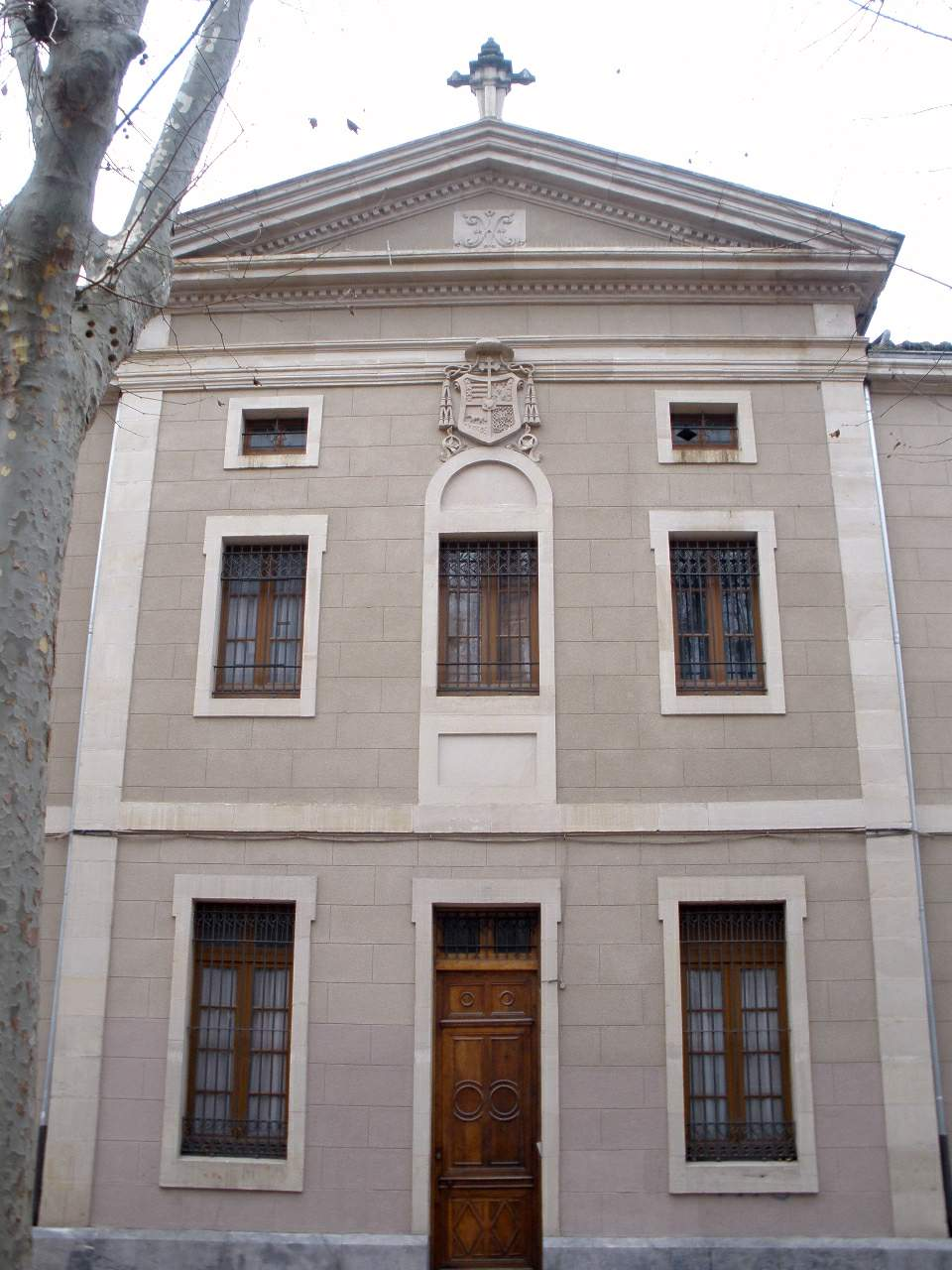
- The façade of the convent
- Interactive map of Convento de las Brígidas

Monastery information
- Order: Bridgettines
- Established: 1589
- Disestablished: 2007
- Archdiocese: Burgos
- Diocese: Vitoria

Architecture
- Completion date: 1909 (current building)

Site
- Location: Vitoria-Gasteiz, Álava Basque Country, Spain
- Coordinates: 42°50′48″N 2°40′38″W

The Convento de las Brígidas (Basque: Brigiden komentua) is a former Bridgettine convent in Vitoria-Gasteiz, Basque Country, Spain. The convent, whose current building dates from the early 20th century, has been vacant since 2007.

== History ==
The earliest documental evidence of the convent dates from 1291. The document is an agreement between the city of Vitoria and the Brotherhood of Arriaga in which Santa María Magdalena was mentioned as marking the borders of the city. At the time the site was a leper hospital operated by the Order of Saint Lazarus. The earliest municipal documents mentioning the hospital, from 1480, called it Casa de la Magdalena. In 1575 the decision was taken to convert the hospital into a convent, with the first Discalced Carmelites arriving in 1589.

Relations between the Carmelite nuns and the city were contentious, often requiring the intervention of the nuncio. As a consequence, on 15 March 1653, the Bridgettines arrived to the city to replace the Carmelites. The Bridgettine convent in Lasarte-Oria was founded in 1671 by nuns from Vitoria. The Convent of Santa Brígida in Mexico City was also founded by Bridgettines from Vitoria in 1739.

The old convent was demolished in 1906 to make room for the construction of the New Cathedral. The new convent was built from 1907 to 1909 under the direction of Fausto Íñiguez de Betolaza. The neoclassical façade of the old convent, dating from 1783, was dismantled and rebuilt at the new site. The convent has been vacant since 2007, when the last remaining nuns relocated to Valladolid. A proposal was made in 2022 to turn the premises into a hospice, but the plans were dropped in early 2024.

== Architecture ==
The most notable element of the convent is the Neoclassical façade designed by Olaguíbel in 1783, originally flanked by two Ionic columns. The church itself has a floor plan in the shape of a Latin cross with very short arms. Its vault is painted with frescoes by local painter Lucio Ruiz. The main altarpiece was purpose-built for the new convent, but the lateral ones were originally from the old one.
