= Justo Antonio de Olaguibel =

Spanish architect

- Born: 8 August 1752; Vitoria, Spain
- Died: 11 February 1818 (aged 65); Vitoria, Spain
- Known for: Famous architect in Vitoria

Justo Antonio de Olaguibel (7 August 1752—11 February 1818) was a Spanish architect from Vitoria. Olaguibel was one of the most important neoclassic architects in the Basque Country.

He studied at the Image School in Vitoria and in Royal San Fernando Academy of Madrid (Spanish: Academia Real San Fernando). He designed many landmarks of Vitoria, such as Los Arquillos or the Plaza España of Vitoria. He also designed two roads: the one which connected Vitoria with La Guardia in 1792, and the road that connected Briñas and Amurrio, in 1793.

== Biography ==
=== Early life ===
The Olaguibel family was originally from Durango. However, in the XVIII the family was already located in Vitoria and it was related to the field of construction. Justo Antonio's father, who was a master builder, took a lot of care of his son's career, so he signed his son up at an early age in the Drawing School of Vitoria, which was dependent of the Real Sociedad Bascongada de Amigos del País. The father's aim was his son to be educated following the academic methods of that period. As a student, Olaguibel stood out among the other pupils, due to his fast learning. This fact encouraged Olaguibel to apply for a place in the Royal San Fernando Academy of Fine Art, in Madrid, in order to improve his studies in architecture and to achieve the qualification he needed.

=== Beginning as an architect ===
In 1781, under mayor Ramón María de Urbina, Olaguibel was offered to design the Plaza Nueva (currently known as Plaza de España), the first neoclassic square in Vitoria. It served as a model for the main squares in Tudela, San Sebastian and Bilbao. This square became the centre of urban activity of Vitoria. Nevertheless, the square was not yet connected to the ancient part of the city, because of the slope between them. Therefore, Olaguibel designed Los Arquillos in 1790, which was a solution to the problem, as it connected the square with the old part of Vitoria harmoniously. Between the two parts are balconies and platforms connected by stairs. The purpose of the architect was to join the old and new parts of Vitoria in a fluent way.

These two works made Olaguibel famous, not only because of adding the first neoclassic buildings to Vitoria, but also to the Basque Country.

=== Religious architecture ===
After having created these two works and specially after 1794, Olaguibel directed his career towards religious creations such as arcades, towers and other smaller constructions, which took part in many villages in the prairie of Alava.

Olaguibel never had a government job, despite the high social class of his job. However, he was related to some personalities of the epoch, such as Samaniego.

Olaguibel spent most of his efforts building the facade of the Convento de la Magdalena in 1783. The convent was located where the New Cathedral of Vitoria is now sited. Nevertheless, they managed to not demolish the building and the facade was transferred to Vicente Goikoetxea street. Fausto Íñiguez de Betolaza was the one in charge of the move.

=== Last years of his life ===
In 1789, Olaguibel built the San Andrés church in Elciego. In 1806, before the Peninsular War, Olaguibel designed the house of the bishop Juan Joé Díaz de Espada in Armentia.

Olaguibel died in Vitoria on 11 February 1818.

== Important works ==
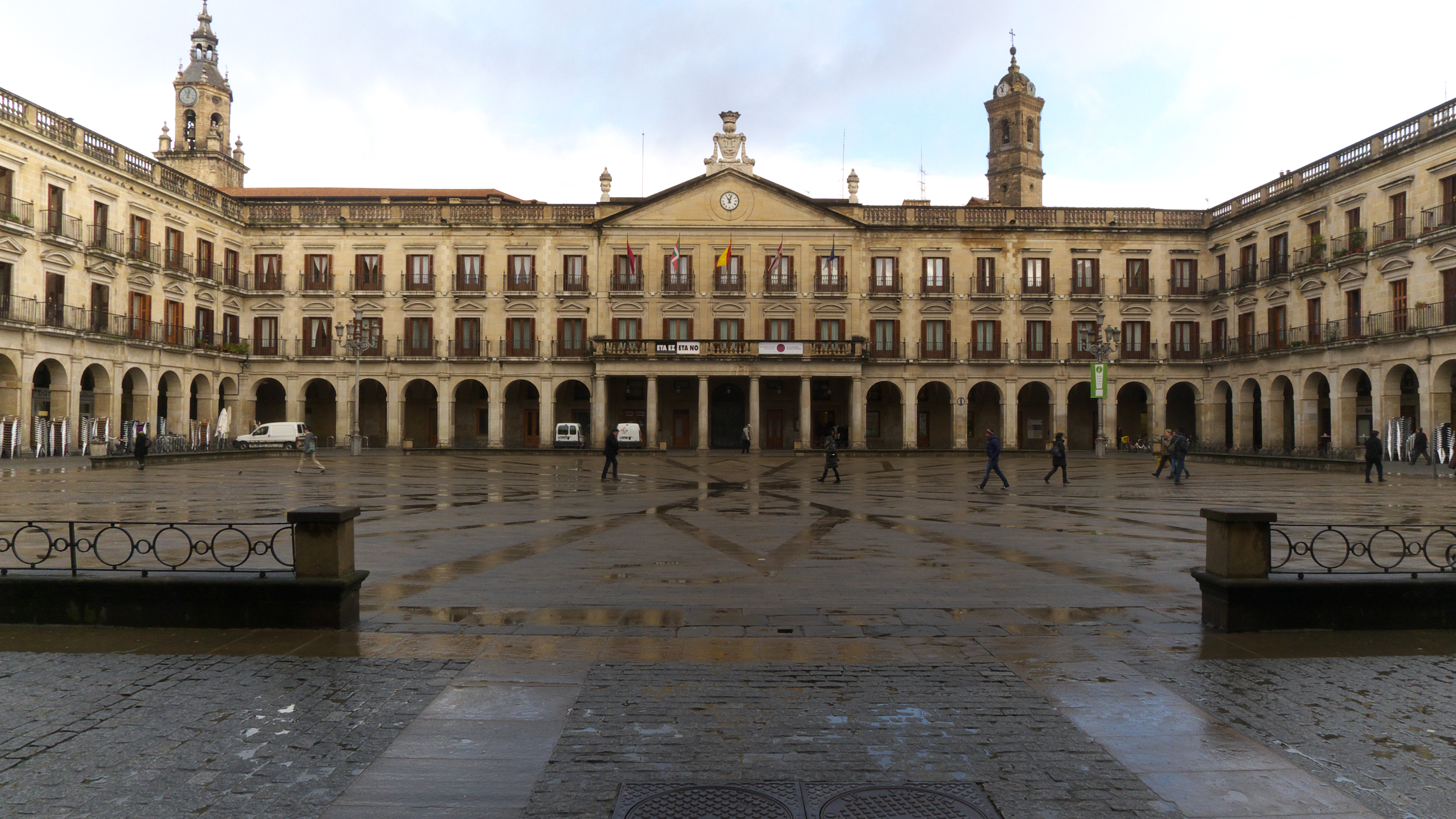
Plaza España in Vitoria

- Plaza España, Vitoria (1781–1791)
- Facade of the Magdalena convent, Vitoria (1783)
- Tower and arcade from Done Bikendi church in Arriaga, Vitoria (1787)
- Town Hall, Orendain (1787)
- San Andres Church, Elciego (1789)
- Town Hall, Leintz Gatzaga (1789)
- Los Arquillos, Vitoria (1790)
- Public fountain, Haro
- Arcade of the church, Aberasturi (1801)
- House of bishop José Díaz Espada, Armentia (1806)
