= Aberásturi =

Hamlet in Álava, Spain

- Concejo
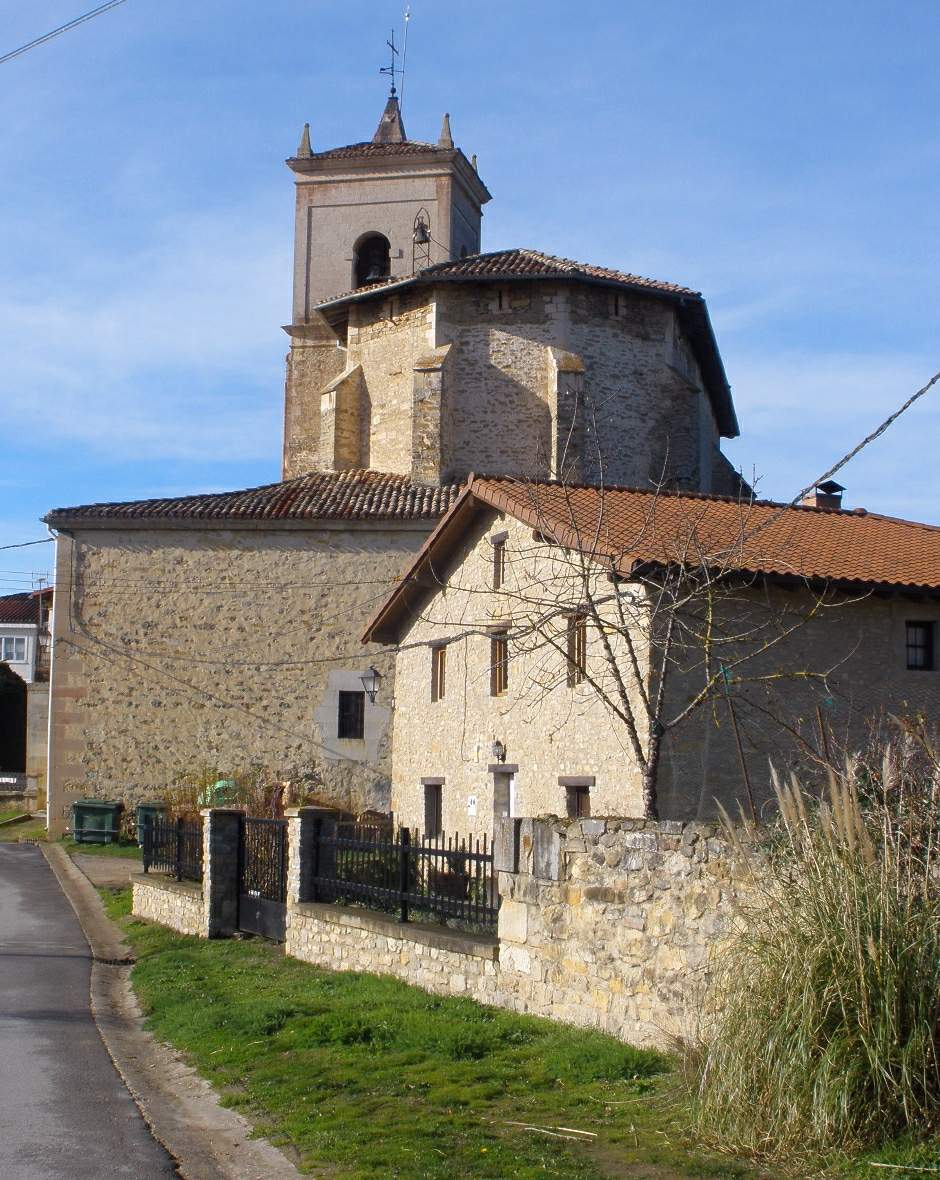
- Church of San Esteban

- Coat of arms

- Location within Álava Location within the Basque Country Location within Spain
- Coordinates: 42°50′N 2°36′W
- Country: Spain
- Autonomous community: Basque Country
- Province: Álava
- Comarca: Vitoria-Gasteiz
- Municipality: Vitoria-Gasteiz

Area
  - Total: 10.03 km^{2} (3.87 sq mi)
- Elevation: 560 m (1,840 ft)

Population (2021)
  - Total: 131
  - Density: 13.1/km^{2} (33.8/sq mi)
- Postal code: 01193

Aberásturi (Spanish pronunciation: [aβeˈɾastuɾi], Basque: Aberasturi) is a hamlet and concejo located in the municipality of Vitoria-Gasteiz, in Álava province, Basque Country, Spain. It is located in the eastern part of the municipality, some 8 km (5.0 mi) from the city center, along the Ertekaberri river at the foot of a mountain and on a hillside.

== History ==
After the Cuadrilla de Añana separated from the Cuadrilla de Vitoria in 1840, Aberásturi remained within Vitoria. The village had previously belonged to the now extinct municipality of Elorriaga, which was absorbed by the municipality of Vitoria around 1870.

== Demographics ==
Historical populations of Aberásturi
Year	Pop.	±% p.a.
1960	242	—
2000	121	−1.72%
2005	121	+0.00%
2010	139	+2.81%
2015	124	−2.26%
2020	130	+0.95%
2021	131	+0.77%

In 1960, Aberásturi had a population of 242. This figured halved by 2000, and has remained stable since then.

== Heritage ==
The Catholic parish church is under the patronage of Saint Stephen. It has a neoclassical portico designed by Justo Antonio de Olaguibel, built during the early nineteenth century. The rest of the building dates from the late fifteenth or early sixteenth century.
