= Cathedral of María Inmaculada of Vitoria =

- Catedral de María Inmaculada de Vitoria (Spanish); Maria Sortzez Garbiaren katedrala (Basque)
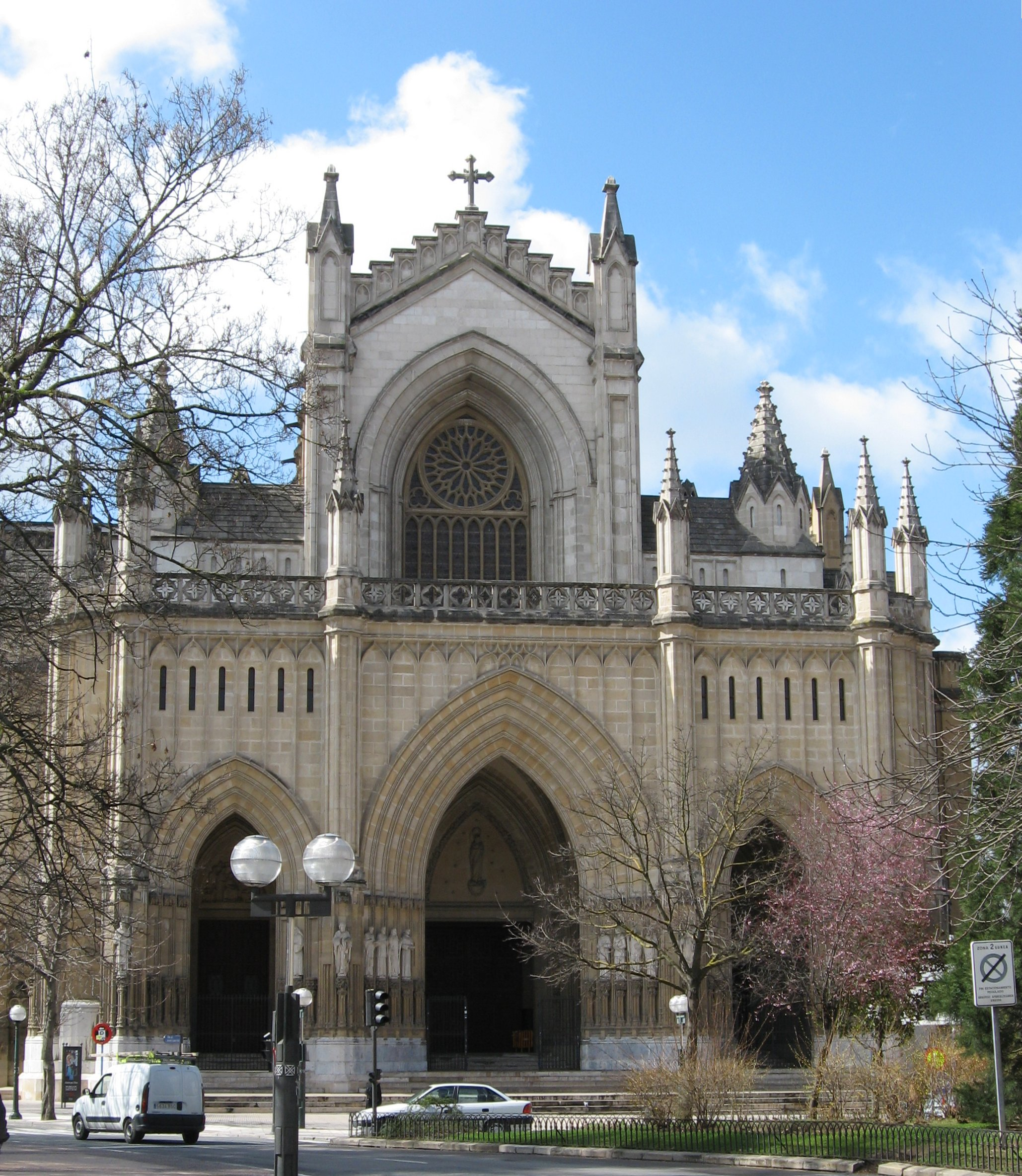

- Location within Spain
- 42.845403°N 2.677563°W
- Location: Vitoria-Gasteiz, Spain

History
- Built: 1907-1914, 1946-1969

Site notes
- Area: Lovaina
- Architect(s): Julián de Apraiz and Javier de Luque (first period); Miguel de Apraiz Barreiro and Antonio Camuñas Paredes (second period)

Spanish Cultural Heritage
- Official name: Maria Sortzez Garbiaren Katedrala (eu) / Catedral de María Inmaculada de Vitoria (es)
- Type: Non-movable
- Criteria: Monument

The Cathedral of María Inmaculada de Vitoria (Basque: Maria Sortzez Garbiaren katedrala, Spanish: Catedral de María Inmaculada de Vitoria, usually known as "The new Cathedral" (Basque: Katedral Berria, Spanish: Catedral Nueva) is a Neogothic-style, Roman Catholic cathedral located in Vitoria-Gasteiz, Basque country, Spain. It was built in the first half of the 20th century.

== History ==
=== First constructive period (1907-1914) ===
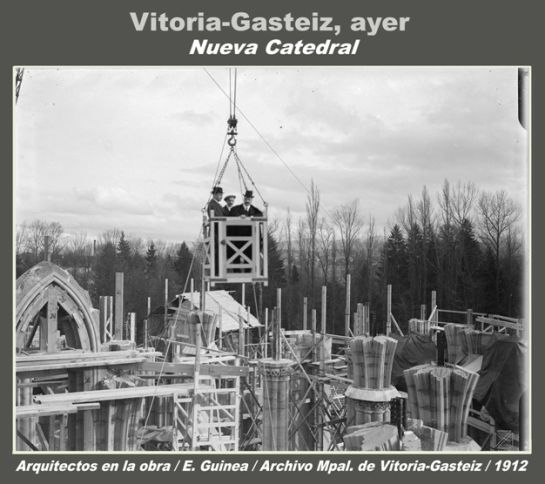
Construction in 1912

On the site that was occupied by the Convento de las Brígidas, near the Florida Park, work started on 4 August 1907, based on the plans by architects Julián Apraiz and Javier de Luque and with the help of José Cadena y Eleta, bishop of Vitoria by then.

=== Second constructive period (1946-1969) ===
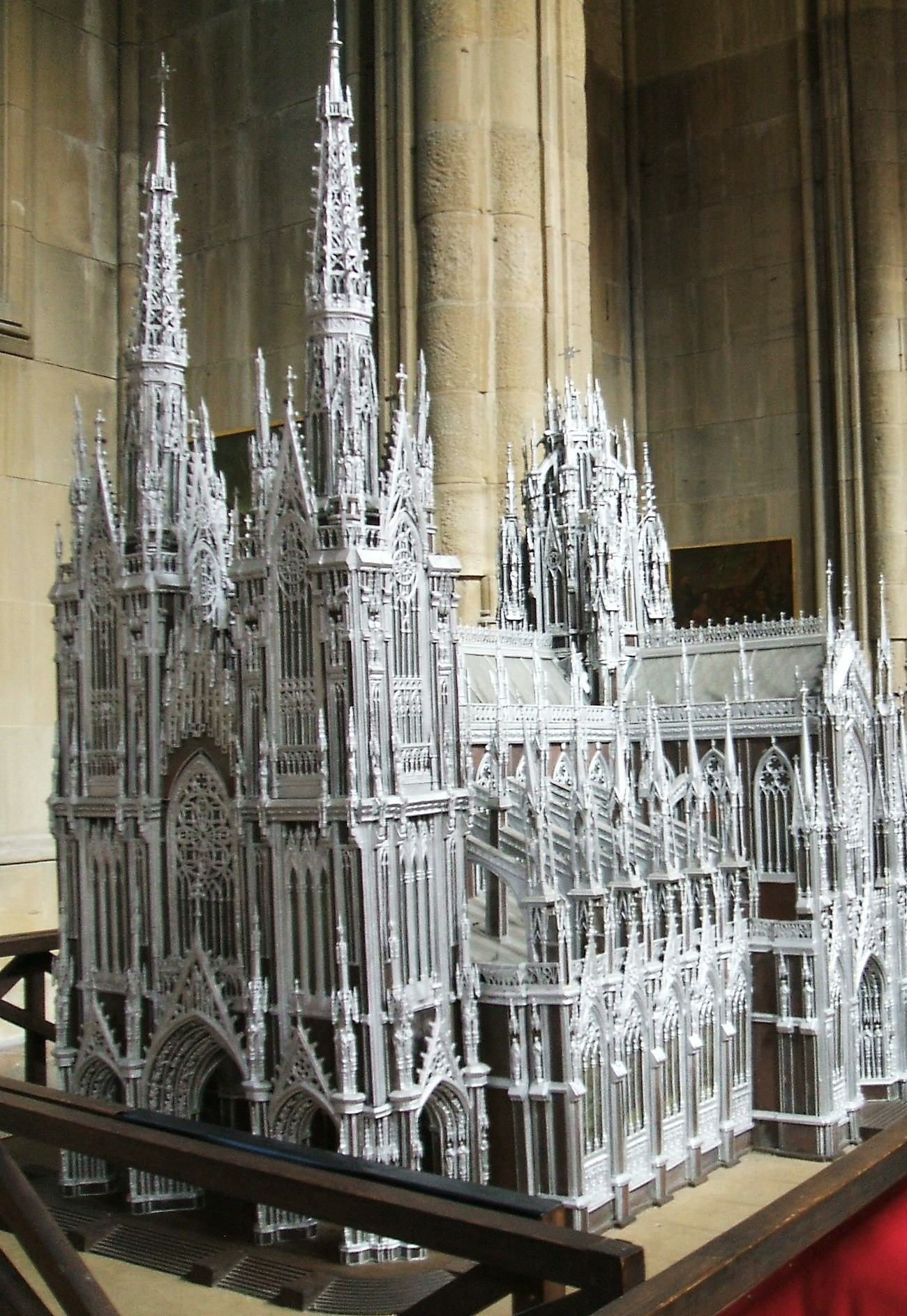
Model of the original project of the new cathedral. It was unfinished.

The popularly named "ruins" of the Cathedral were covered by ivy and weeds. Works were not restarted until 1946, once the Spanish Civil War had ended. They were economically helped by the bishop Carmelo Ballester Nieto and directed by the architect Miguel de Apraiz Barreiro, Julián's son.

Construction proceeded slowly, respecting the initial style but incorporating the new techniques of concrete and artificial stone. In 1949 the ambulatory and lower part towards the transept were completed. By 1952 the high nave of the presbytery, the north side portal and a low tower, instead of the original dome, were built. Between 1960 and 1963 the windows made in the first period were placed, and the ambulatory reliefs by the artist es:Enrique Monjo. Between 1964 and 1969 the rest of the cathedral was covered without adding external buttresses, unnecessary due to the lightening and strengthening due to the use of new materials mentioned above.

Although unfinished, the temple was consecrated on 24 September 1969 by the papal legate Cardinal Dell'Acqua, accompanied by several archbishops and Spanish bishops, and in the presence of the head of state, General Francisco Franco, his wife and almost all of the government.

This work was completed in 1973, while the head of the diocese was Bishop Francisco Peralta, thanks to the confluence of financial allocations from the Provincial Council of Alava, the Ministry of Housing and numerous private donations.

== Description ==
The building, of imposing proportions, has 5 longitudinal naves, one main and four side naves, a crossing of three naves, an apse aisle with two naves with seven apsidal chapels, a porch, a crypt and a sacristy. With an apse-to-portico length of 118 metres, it is 62 metres wide between the two end walls of the transept and 35 meters high on the crossing. It is the second largest church in Spain after the Cathedral of Seville. Its Latin cross is reminiscent of the Chartres Cathedral and covers an area of 5,750 square meters and can shelter 150,000 people inside.

== See also ==
- Cathedral of Santa María de Vitoria
