= Elorriaga =

Hamlet in Álava, Spain

- Concejo
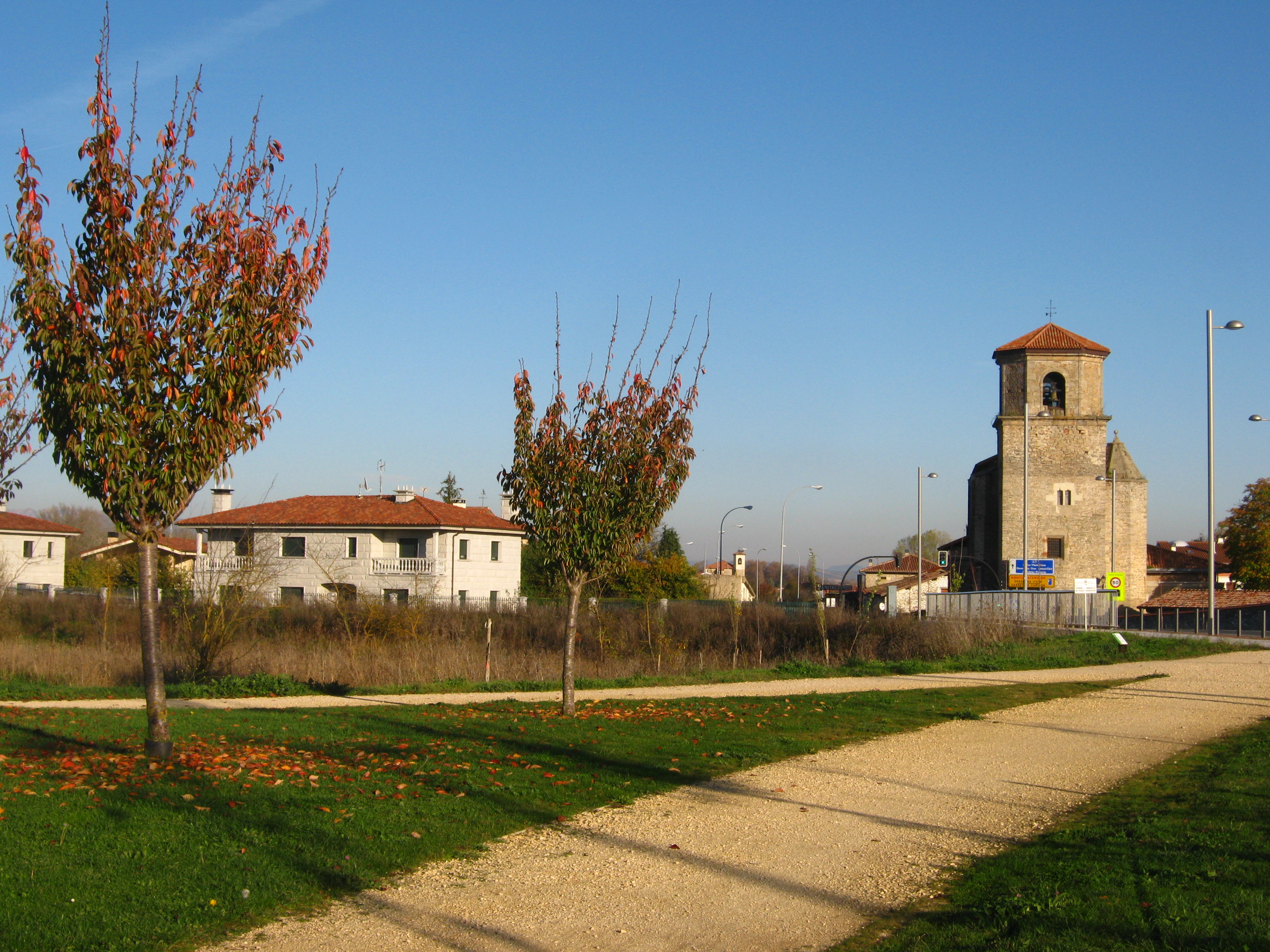
- Entrance to the hamlet

- Coat of arms

- Location within Álava Location within the Basque Country Location within Spain
- Coordinates: 42°51′N 2°38′W
- Country: Spain
- Autonomous community: Basque Country
- Province: Álava
- Comarca: Vitoria-Gasteiz
- Municipality: Vitoria-Gasteiz
- Elevation: 516 m (1,693 ft)

Population (2021)
  - Total: 112
- Postal code: 01192

Elorriaga (Basque pronunciation: [elori.aɣa], Spanish pronunciation: [eloˈrjaɣa]) is a hamlet and concejo located in the municipality of Vitoria-Gasteiz, in Álava province, Basque Country, Spain.
