= Plaza de España, Vitoria-Gasteiz =

Square in Vitoria-Gasteiz, Basque Country, Spain

Plaza de España/Espainia plaza
- Plaza Nueva/Plaza Berria
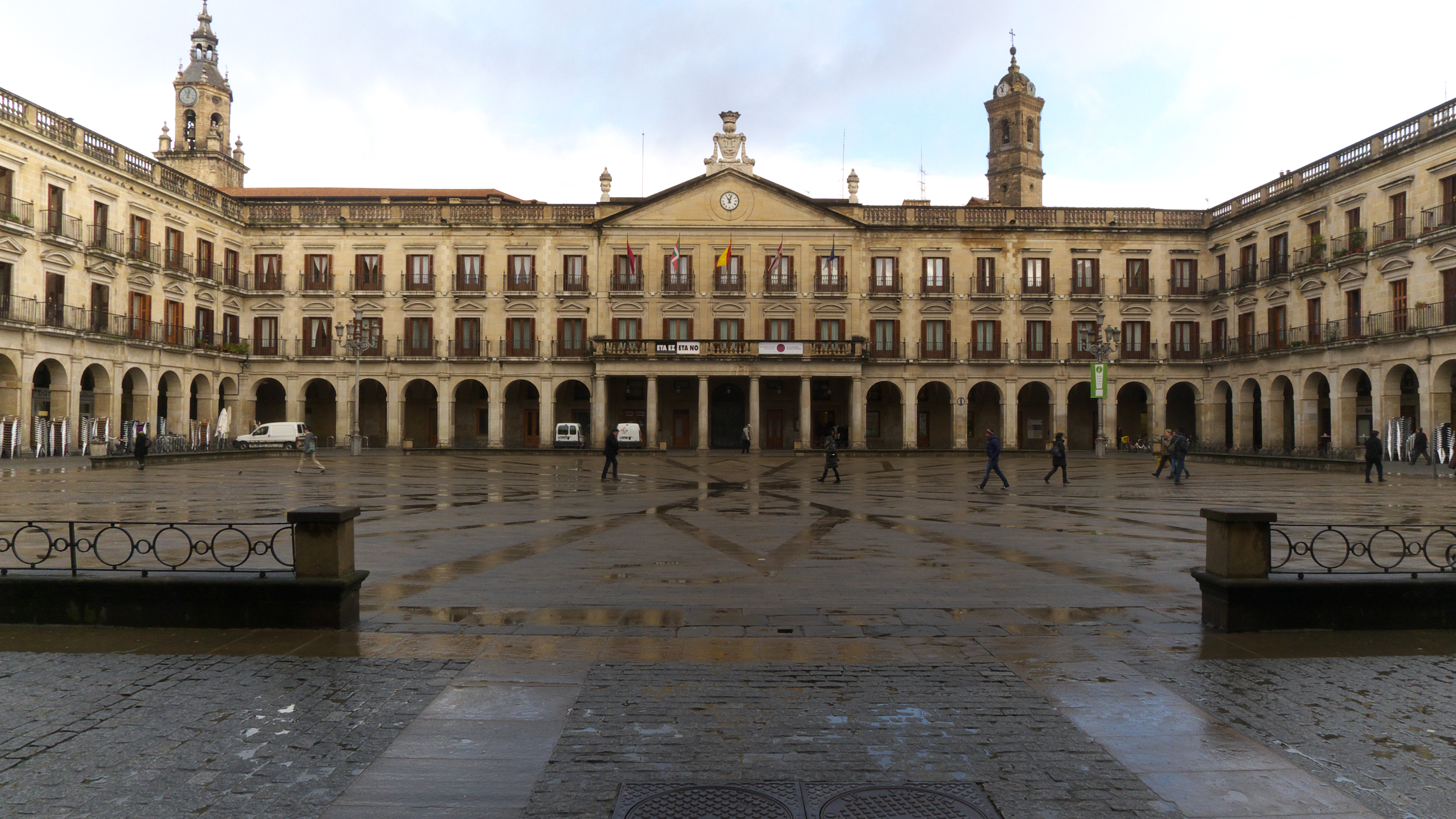
- Location: Vitoria-Gasteiz, Basque Country, Spain
- Coordinates: 42.846469°N 2.672398°W
- Architect: Justo Antonio de Olaguíbel

Spanish Cultural Heritage
- Official name: Plaza Nueva
- Type: Non-movable
- Criteria: Monument
- Designated: 1984
- Reference no.: RI-51-0005112

Plaza de España (Spanish for 'Spain Square', Basque: Espainia plaza) or Plaza Nueva (Spanish for 'New Square', Basque: Plaza Berria) (Note: According to the street list published by the city council, the official names are Plaza de España (Plaza Nueva) in Spanish and Espainia plaza (Plaza Berria) in Basque.) is a square in Vitoria-Gasteiz, Basque Country, Spain. It was declared Bien de Interés Cultural in 1984.
