= Brotherhood of Arriaga =

Medieval institution in Álava

The Brotherhood of Arriaga (Spanish: Cofradía de Arriaga, Basque: Arriagako kofradia) was a medieval institution in Álava, in the modern-day Basque Country of Spain. Its existence is documented from 1258 (although by that time it was likely well-established) until its dissolution in 1332.

== History ==
While there are no documents mentioning the Brotherhood before 1258, by then it was probably well-established. The Chronicle of Alfonso XI, written in the 1370s, hints at the existence of the Brotherhood by the time of the Castilian conquest of Álava in 1200. Furthermore, a treaty signed in 1179 between Sancho VI of Navarre and Alfonso VIII of Castile might also hint at its existence.

It is likely that the Brotherhood originated in response to the growing power of towns in Álava, which threatened the interests of the rural nobility. It was headed by a Lord who had fiscal and protective powers over its territory. Most high-ranking members of the Brotherhood belonged to notable Castilian families, such as the houses of Lara, Haro, Cameros and Salcedo. Most members of the Brotherhood were hidalgos, but the high clergy (such as the Bishop of Calahorra) and some landed hidalgas also participated.

The first written reference to the Brotherhood of Arriaga dates from 1258. It was an accord granted by Alfonso X of Castile between the governments of Vitoria and Salvatierra and the Brotherhood, by which the Brotherhood ceded a number of hamlets and fishing rights in exchange of confirmation of their Fuero and juridical status. In 1286 king Sancho IV transferred the village of Lasarte from the Brotherhood to the city of Vitoria. In February 1332 an arbitration ruling was issued regarding the ownership of 45 hamlets disputed by the Brotherhood and the towns of Vitoria and Salvatierra. The ruling awarded the Brotherhood only four of the hamlets in dispute. As a consequence, the Brotherhood dissolved itself on April 2 of the same year.

== Territorial scope ==
By the time of the Castilian conquest in 1200, seven settlements in Álava had been given town status: Salinas de Añana, Laguardia, Vitoria, Antoñana, Bernedo, Arganzón and Labraza. The granting of town status to Labastida, Korres, Santa Cruz de Campezo, Artziniega, Valderejo, Kontrasta and San Vicente de Arana between 1242 and 1328 didn't cause any conflicts with the Brotherhood, as they were located outside of its jurisdiction. However, the granting of town status to Salvatierra created an enclave in its territory. In 1258, the Brotherhood ceded Arriaga (where its meetings were held), Betoño, Adurza, Aretxabaleta, Gardelegi, Olarizu, Mendiola, Ali and Castillo to Vitoria; while Arrizala, Opakua and Alangua (as well as three other settlements which have since disappeared) were ceded to Salvatierra. After 1258, the territory of the Brotherhood consisted of about half of the modern province of Álava.
