= Bujanda =

- Village
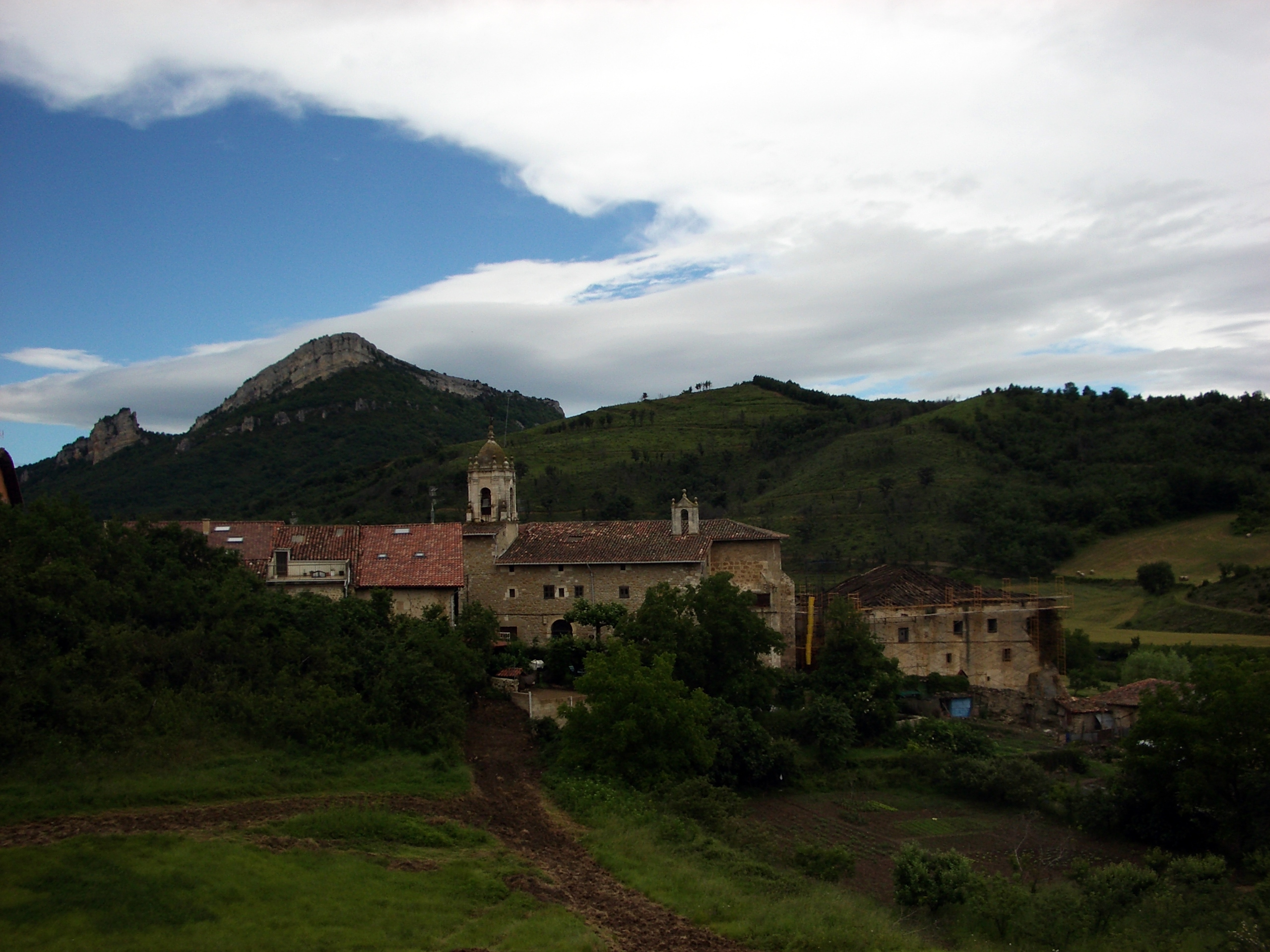

- Location of Bujanda within the Basque Autonomous Community Bujanda (Spain)
- Coordinates: 42°40′N 2°24′W
- Country: Spain
- Autonomous community: Basque Country
- Province: Álava
- Comarca: Montaña Alavesa
- Municipality: Campezo
- Elevation: 615 m (2,018 ft)

Population (2014)
  - Total: 19
- Demonym(s): bujandés, charrín (in Spanish)
- Time zone: UTC+1 (CET)
  - Summer (DST): UTC+2 (CEST)
- Postal code: 01128
- Official language(s): Spanish; Basque (Euskera)

Bujanda is a village in Álava, Basque Country, Spain. The parish church contains the incorrupt remains of San Fausto Labrador, which has in the past given it some fame. At its largest, the village had around 150 inhabitants; but migration in the 1960s resulted in a great reduction in population. Its future is oriented towards culture, sports and ecology due to its proximity to Antoñana (a walled medieval village), the Nature Park of Izki, greenways and mountain bike routes, hiking; as well as to very attractive areas such as Merindad de Estella, Treviño, Rioja and the Basque Coast.

== Etymology ==
The place name appears as Buszanda for the first time in a document dated in the year 1071. Then, Buxanda appears in several records (such as the Record of Ordinances of Alava). Later the x became in the modern sound j, which is the form used in the current official name (Bujanda). It may mean "place of boxwood" from the Latin buxus plus the locative suffix -anda.

== Geography ==
Bujanda belongs orographically to the upper basin of the river Ega. It is situated 615 metres (2,018 ft) above sea level on the eastern slope of the Muela mountain (1,059 metres (3,474 ft)). Bujanda is located at the southern tip of the Nature Park of Izki. Bujanda is 7 km (4.3 mi) from Santa Cruz de Campezo, capital of the municipality; 36 km (22 mi) from Vitoria, capital of Alava; 35 km (22 mi) from Estella, principal town of Merindad de Estella; and 40 km (25 mi) from Logroño, capital of La Rioja.

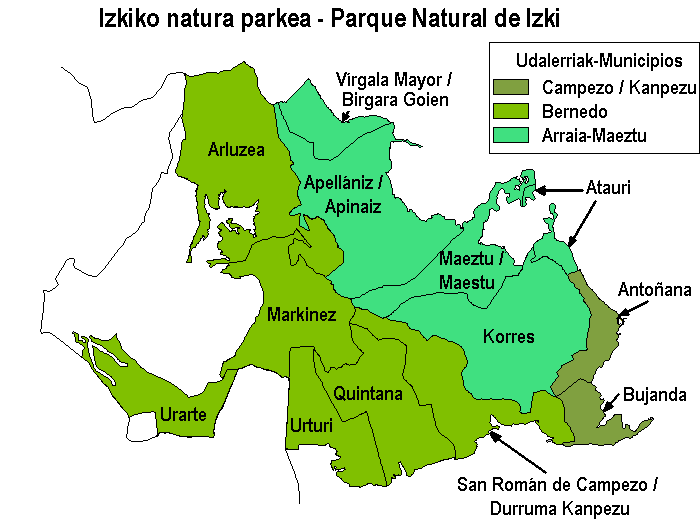

- Altitude: 615 metres (2,018 ft)
- Latitude: 42°40'25" N
- Longitude: 2º24'19" W

== Transportation ==
- Bus Vitoria-Estella, Vitoria-Calahorra, stopping at Antoñana, 3 km (1.9 mi).

== Demographics ==
According to the census of 1960, Bujanda then had 97 inhabitants. But since that date the population has experienced a setback, falling by two-thirds in only fifteen years. The census of 1975 counted 34 people, and that was more than double the 16 of 2008: 11 men and 5 women, the lowest population to date. As of 2014, the latest available data, there are 19 people: 14 men and 5 women.

From the late sixteenth century (the earliest date when census data were recorded) until the mid-nineteenth century, the population generally increased; but from then on there has been a gradual decline, accentuated during the important agricultural transformation of the 1960s:

- In the late sixteenth century: 75 people
- In the late eighteenth century: 100 people
- In the mid- nineteenth century: 150 people
- In 1900: 124 people
- In 1930: 113 people
- In 1960: 97 people
- In 2008: 16 people
- In 2014: 19 people

== Administrative arrangements ==
Bujanda has its own mayor, elected by the village inhabitants. The latest elections took place in December 2013, and the winning candidate received four votes.

Bujanda is part of the municipality of Campezo, together with Antoñana, Oteo, Orbiso and Santa Cruz de Campezo.

== Festivals and customs ==
=== Prayers to San Fausto Labrador ===
According to chronicles of the historian Joaquín José de Landázuri y Romarate, San Fausto Labrador originally came from Alguaire, Lleida, Catalonia. He devoted himself to the poor and needy from his youth. He was taken prisoner by the Saracens during a voyage in the Mediterranean, and made slave to a master who beat him whenever he prayed. One day, the master was astonished to see the farm implements labouring of their own volition while the saint was at prayer. The saint baptised him, and the two of them travelled to Alguaire. When San Fausto was near death, he said to his relatives and friends: "after my death, lay my body on my horse, and the place to where God leads it, there you shall leave me." He must have died around the year 614. Relatives and friends obeyed his request, and the horse finally stopped at Bujanda.

The villages which offer prayers to San Fausto are:

- Antoñana, San Roman, Corres and Bujanda (the Concord)
- Rosselló (Lleida), after Easter
- Iruraiz-Gauna ( Llanada Alavesa ), Saturday September
- Valles de Laminoria and Arraya
- Orbiso, Day of San Prudencio
- Ancín (Navarra), day of San Isidro
- Genevilla (Navarra), last Sunday in May
- Apellániz (valle de Arraya), Sunday of Pentecost
- Santa Cruz de Campezo
- Barriobusto (Rioja Alavesa), Sunday before Pentecost
- Labraza (Rioja Alavesa), Sunday of Pentecost
- Quintana, Sunday after Corpus Christi
- Alguaire (Lleida), first Sunday of July

=== Festivities ===
They are celebrated the first weekend of October. The celebration usually includes the following activities:

- Friday
  - Opening speech and fireworks
  - Fellowship dinner
- Saturday
  - Ascent of Mount Soila
  - Mass
  - Popular Chorizada
  - Card-playing championships at brisca (women) and mus (men)
  - Costume competition
  - chocolatada (Hot chocolate)
  - Verbena (Music)
- Sunday
  - Dancing pasacalles
  - Mass of Concord (San Roman, Corres, Antoñana and Bujanda)
  - Inflatable castle
  - Final championship of cards (brisca and mus)
  - Games for children

== See also ==
- Campezo
- Antoñana
- Orbiso
