= Izki (river) =

River in Álava, Basque Country, Spain

Coordinates: 42.6746°N 2.3879°W

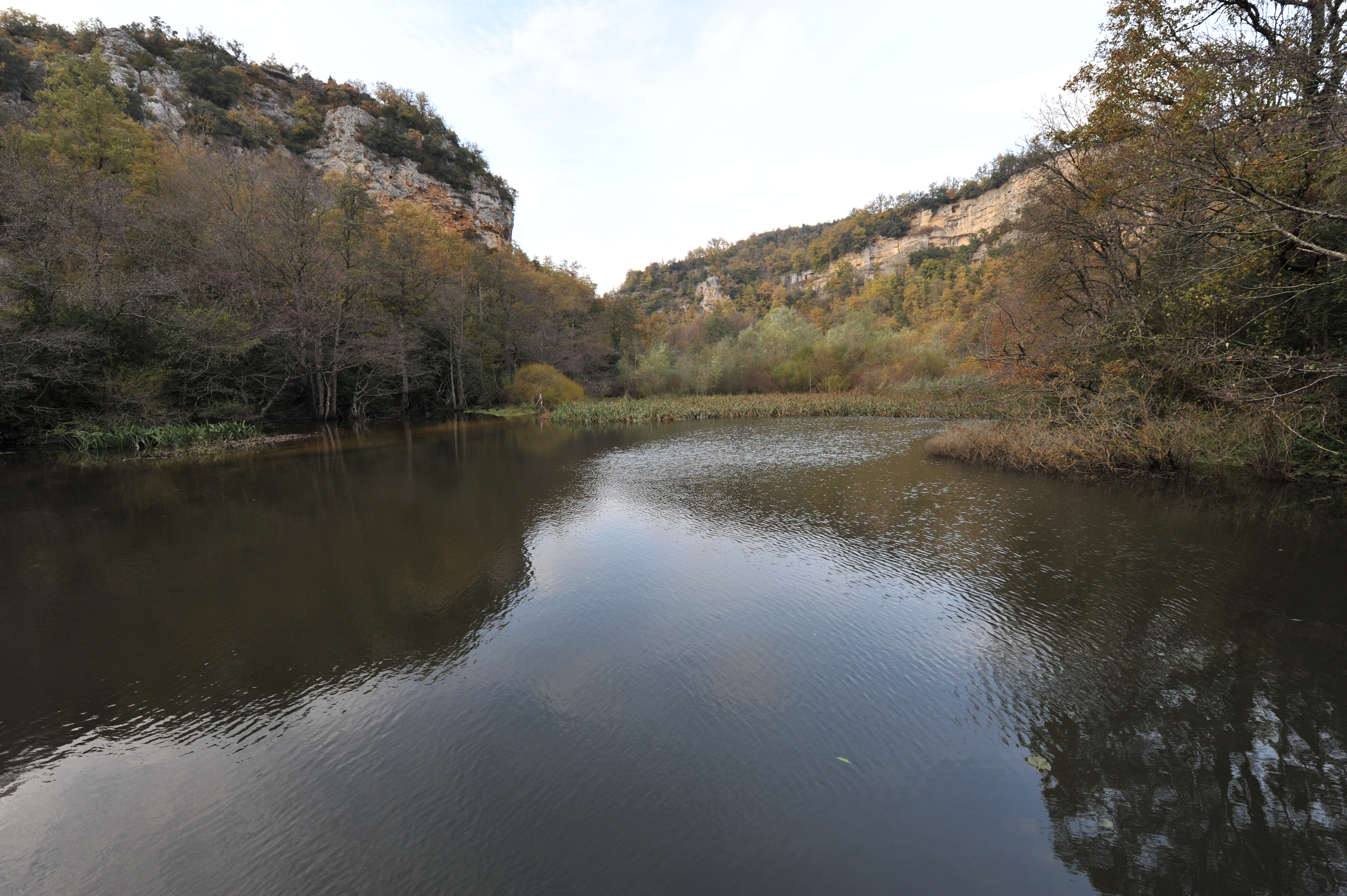
- View of the Aranbaltza reservoir

Location
- Country: Spain
- Autonomous community: Basque Country
- Province: Álava

Physical characteristics
- Mouth
  - location: Ega river near Bujanda
- Length: 15.74 km (9.78 mi)
- Discharge
  - average: 610 L/s (22 cu ft/s)

Basin features
- Progression: Ega→ Ebro→ Balearic Sea

Natura 2000 site (SAC)
- Designated: May 2003
- Part of: Ega-Berron ibaia / Río Ega-Berron
- Reference no.: ES2110020

The Izki is a river in Álava, Basque Country, Spain. It is a tributary of the Ega river, itself a tributary of the Ebro. Most of its course is located within the Izki Natural Park. The river is part of the Ega-Berron Special Area of Conservation. It is home to a population of European mink, a critically endangered species. The Eurasian otter is also present.

== Course ==
The Izki River has a length of 15.74 km (9.78 mi) and it constitutes the central axis of the Izki Natural Park, its basin covering about 60% of its surface. The most common rock type in the basin is sandstone, and most of it is covered by forests. Most tributaries of the Izki river are short streams. Near Korres, the river traverses an area dominated by calcarenites, forming a gorge between the summits of Soila and Muela. After the gorge, the river reaches a wide alluvial plain where it converges with the Ega. The average discharge there is of 610 L/s (22 cu ft/s). In the summer, the dry season can be very marked, with some sections of the river and its tributaries drying out.

The small Aranbaltza dam is located in the gorge. From it, a surface canal diverts about 200–300 L/s (7.1–10.6 cu ft/s) of water into a reservoir near Bujanda which is also fed by a canal coming from the Ega river north of Atauri. The water from the reservoir is used (with an elevation difference of around 70 m (230 ft)) to power a small hydroelectric plant in Antoñana. The plant was built in 1905 and put back into operation in 2015.
