= Ullibarri-Viña =

Hamlet in Álava, Spain

Ullibarri-Viña/Uribarri-Dibiña
- Concejo
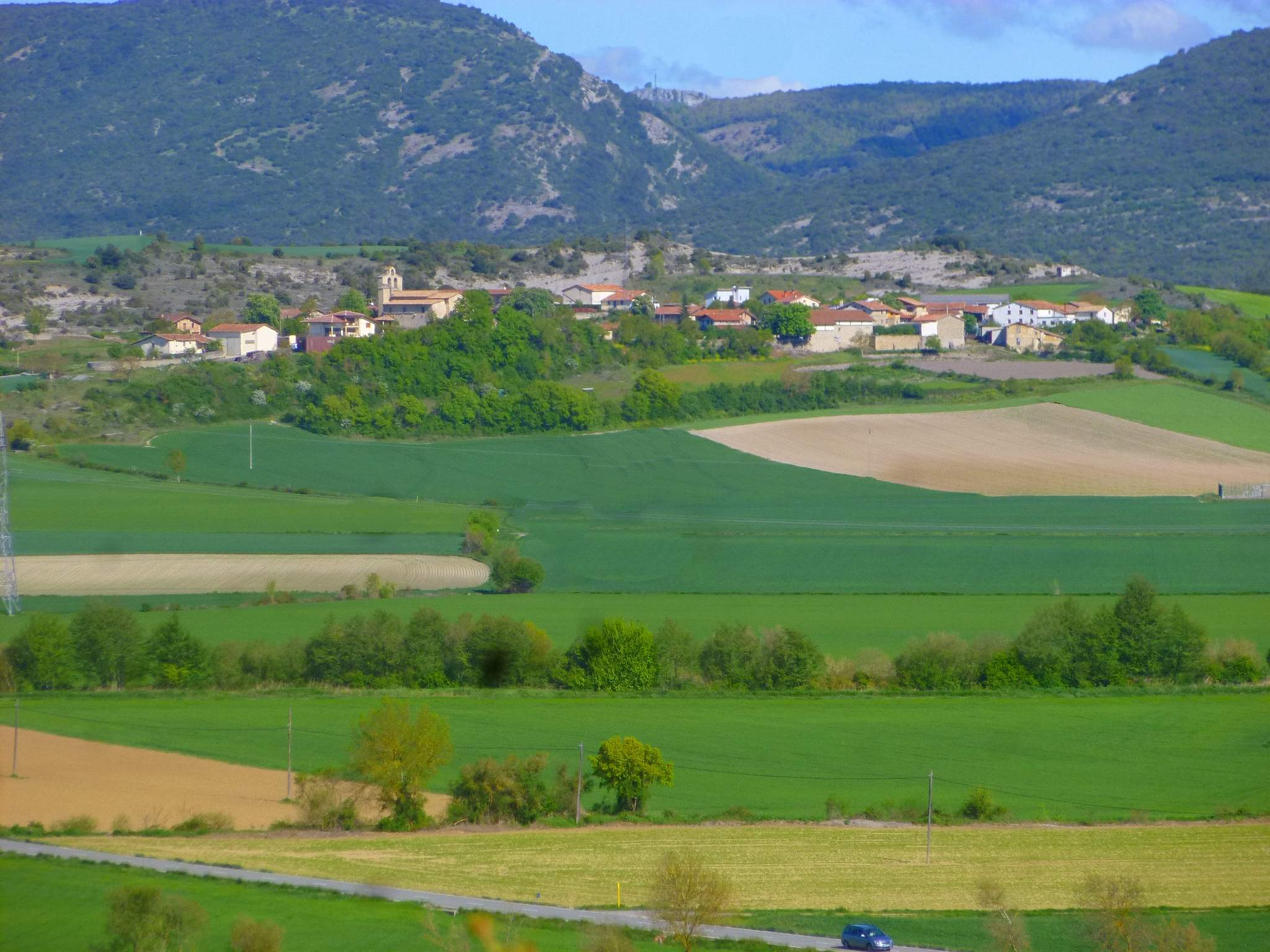
- View of Ullibarri-Viña from Estarrona

- Location within Álava Location within the Basque Country Location within Spain
- Coordinates: 42°52′52″N 2°45′52″W
- Country: Spain
- Autonomous community: Basque Country
- Province: Álava
- Comarca: Vitoria-Gasteiz
- Municipality: Vitoria-Gasteiz

Area
  - Total: 4.61 km^{2} (1.78 sq mi)
- Elevation: 549 m (1,801 ft)

Population (2023)
  - Total: 38
  - Density: 8.2/km^{2} (21/sq mi)
- Postal code: 01191

Ullibarri-Viña (Spanish pronunciation: [uʝiˈβari ˈβiɲa]) or Uribarri-Dibiña (Basque pronunciation: [uɾiβari ðiβiɲa]) is a hamlet and concejo in the municipality of Vitoria-Gasteiz, in Álava province, Basque Country, Spain.
