= Korres (disambiguation) =

Korres may refer to:

- Emmanouil Korres (born 1948), Greek restoration architect, civil engineer and professor of architectural history
- Korres, Greek cosmetic company
- Korres Engineering, Greek company
- Korres, Álava, hamlet in Spain

== See also ==
- Corres, surname
