= Orbiso =

- Village
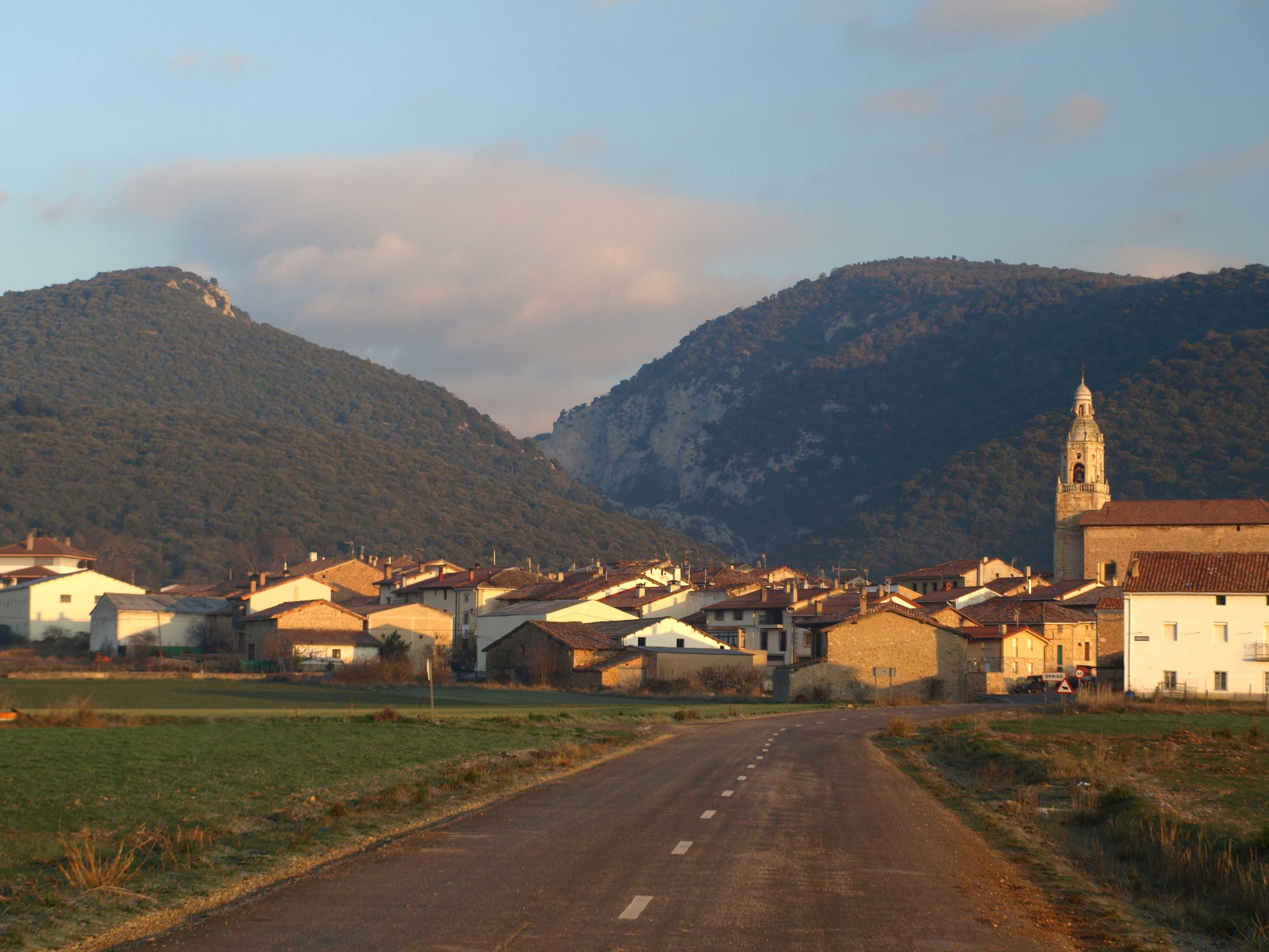

- Location of Orbiso within the Basque Autonomous Community Orbiso (Spain)
- Coordinates: 42°41′46″N 2°20′8″W
- Country: Spain
- Autonomous community: Basque Country
- Province: Araba/Álava
- Eskualdea / Comarca: Montaña Alavesa
- Municipality: Campezo/Kanpezu
- Elevation: 588 m (1,929 ft)

Population
  - Total: 110
- Demonym(s): Patones, Orbisoar
- Time zone: UTC+1 (CET)
  - Summer (DST): UTC+2 (CEST)
- Postal code: 01117
- Official language(s): Spanish, Basque (Euskera)

Orbiso is a village situated the region of the Montaña Alavesa which allows for traversing from the valley of Campezo/Kanpezu to the valley of Arana, both in Álava, and at last to the Cordillera de Santiago Lózquiz in Navarra. This small town is 43 km far from Vitoria-Gasteiz and 28 km from Estella, and the way to get there is first taking the A-132 highway and then the A-4161. In the propinquity of Orbiso merges Cruz de Alda, the Istora’s Cliff, the park of Santa Lucía and the Franciscanos de San Julián de Piédrola’s convent. Related to the vegetation, Orbiso’s mountains are covered by holm oaks, oaks and arbutus, where a lot of wild animals live. There also are a lot of walnut trees, chestnuts and cherry trees. The economy of this village is based on the agricultural exploitation because of its dry and irrigated lands. Orbiso’s local government it’s the council of Campezo, formed by Santa Cruz/Santikurutze, Oteo, Bujanda, Antoñana and Orbiso.

== History ==
Because of its location, Orbiso has been a crossing place between Álava and Navarra since pre-romanesque times and that is the reason why the name of this village appears in a lot of documents, thought it was written in different ways such as “Urbisu” or “Urbiso”. At first, some villages existed, for example San Pedro or San Cristóbal, but approximately in the 17th century the convergence of those little towns around started, pointed in the exploitation of the solar light and the possibilities that that environment gave to fortify. In 1377 Orbiso was dominated by Ruy Díaz de Rojas, who ended handing it over to the King Enrique II, after having it gave back from Carlos II of Navarra. In the 16th century, all those villages, Santa Cruz de Campezo and some others were owned by Mr Álvaro Mendoza, the first Count of Orgaz. Then, in the 1738 it reached the title of “Villa”, becoming free from Santa Cruz the Campezo. As a reward, some young men had to serve as guides in some battles that took place in the region. Orbiso was the scene of several military encounters during the first Carlist War between Zumacárregui and the liberals which commanded Lorenzo and Córdoba.

== Monuments ==
The historical center of this little town is assembled by four main parallel streets oriented toward NW-SE. In this way, they are communicated among together by short and narrow passageways, as they were in the 16th century. In both of the end sides of the Mayor Street, two squares, where the religious buildings are, can be found, and in the most septentrional, the Santo Cristo chapel. In the other extreme, there is the parish church San Andrés, with a two segment baroque tower, and closed by an ovated dome and a cylindrical cupola, is originated in the second half of the 18th century. The temple, with squared floors, was carried out in the 16th century, as the main altarpiece made by Juan de Araoz and finished in 1598. It is concluded by a baroque shallow vault of the 18th century, divided into dissimilars areas. In both sides of the main altarpiece exist two smaller altarpieces, the one in the left side, it is consecrated in memory of La Virgen del Rosario, and was produced by D. Bartolomé Calvo sculptor.

== Festivities ==
The festivities of this village are celebrated in honour to its patron, San Andrés, the first weekend of June. In the Santa Lucía’s shrine, some activities such as religious ceremonies are celebrated the Sunday following to San Pedro. In August, the first Saturday next to the 15th, a dinner is celebrated, where all the people living in the village is invited to.
