= Izki Natural Park =

Natural park in the Basque Country, Spain

Coordinates: 42.706°N 2.494°W

- Parque natural de Izki; Izkiko natura parkea
- IUCN category V (protected landscape/seascape)
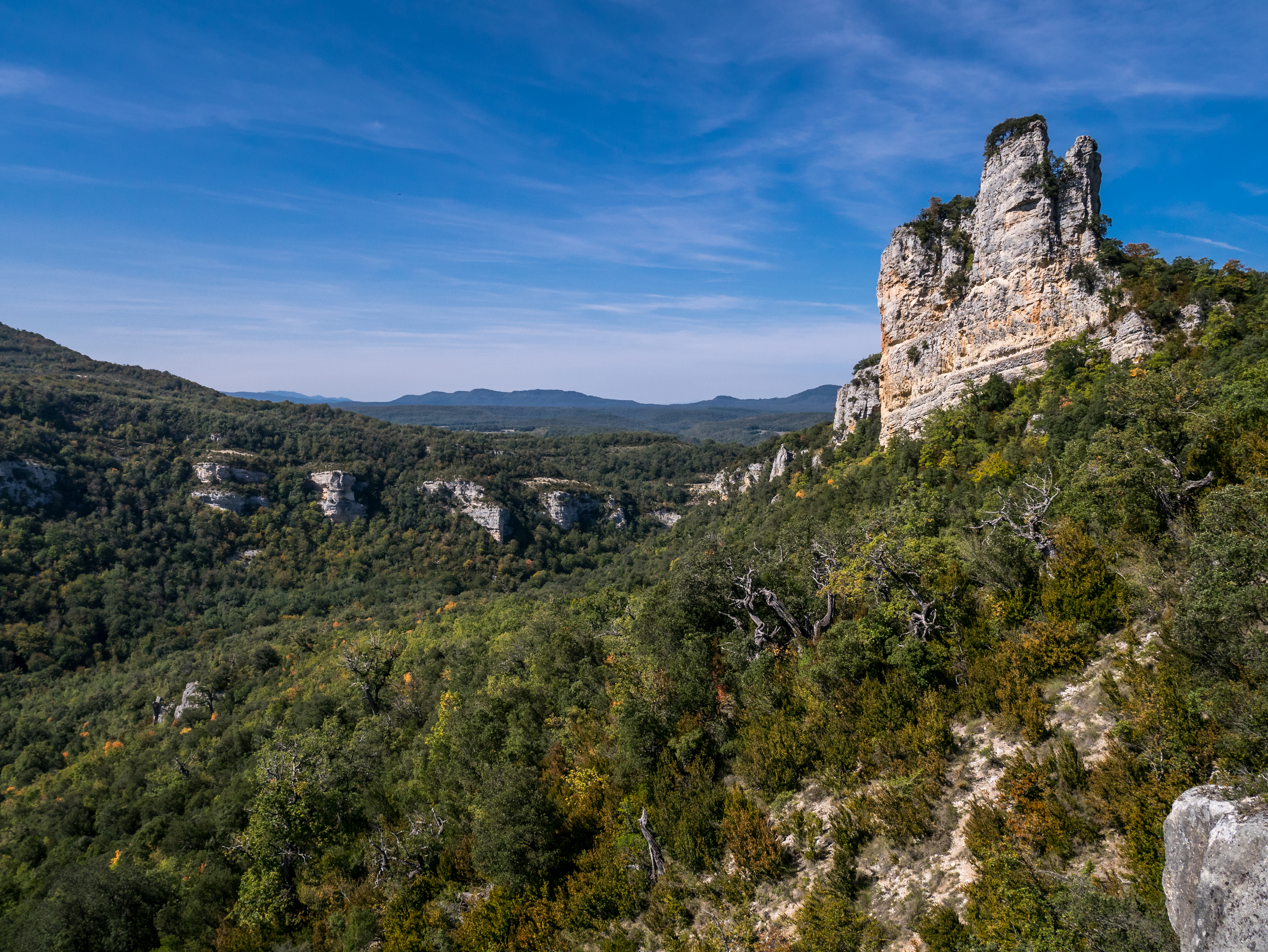
- View of Peña del Castillo

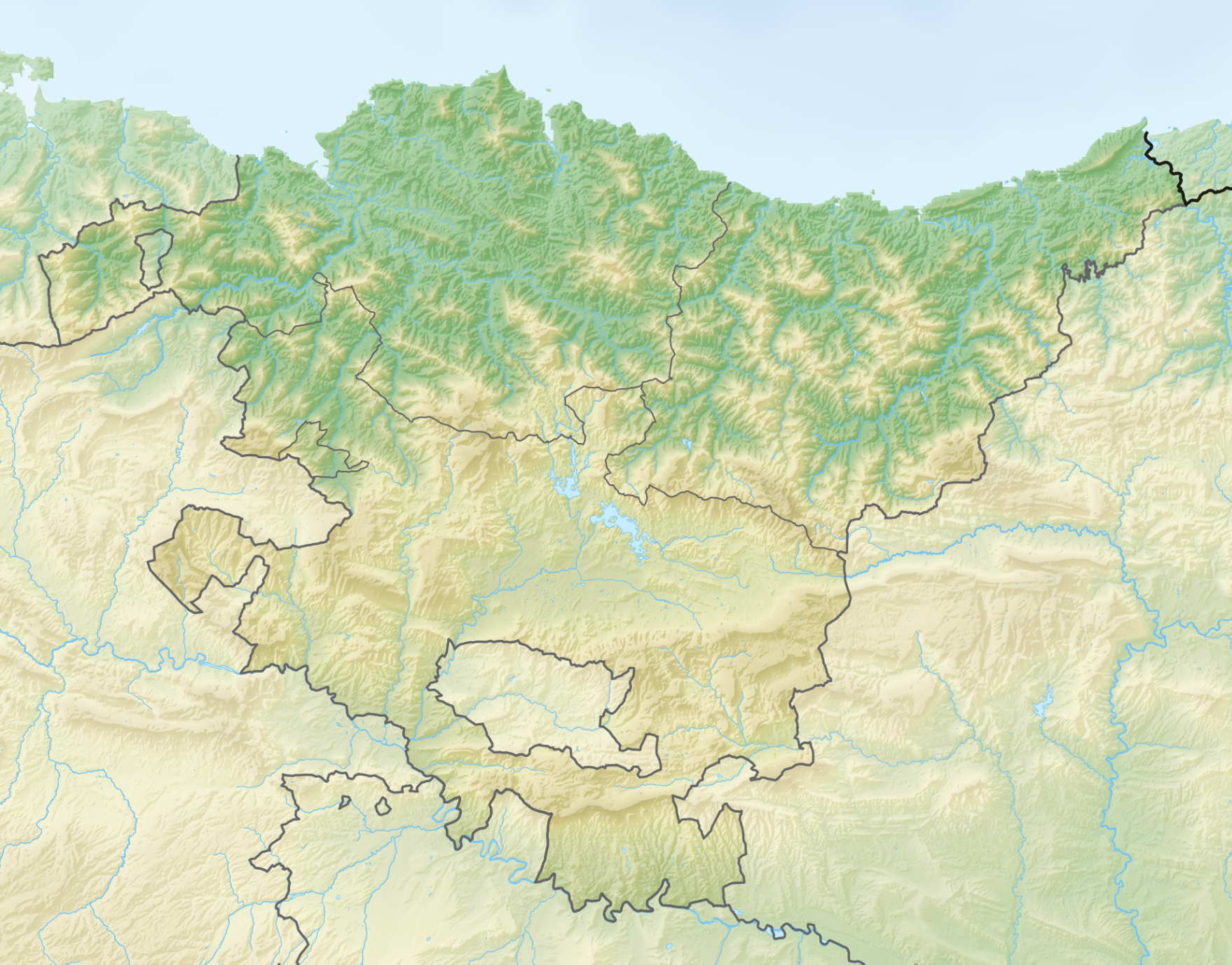
- Location within the Basque Country Location within Spain
- Location: Álava, Basque Country, Spain
- Area: 90.16 km^{2} (34.81 sq mi)
- Established: 31 March 1998

Natura 2000 site (SAC/SPA)
- Official name: Izki
- Designated: December 1997
- Reference no.: ES2110019
- Area: 94.82 km^{2} (36.61 sq mi)

The Izki Natural Park (Basque: Izkiko natura parkea, Spanish: Parque natural de Izki) is in Álava, Basque Country, Spain. The park encompasses the valley of the Izki river, which is mostly covered by Quercus pyrenaica forests. Korres is the only settlement within the park.

== Location and weather ==
The park limits the Montes de Vitoria range to the north, the northern branch of the Ega river to the east, the Sierra de Cantabria to the south and Treviño to the west. Its highest point is Kapildui (1,117 m (3,665 ft)).

Izki is in a transition area between the Atlantic and the Mediterranean climate domains. Despite the geographical barriers encountered by the winds coming from the northwest, the yearly rainfall averages 800 mm (31 in). Winters are cold, with temperatures often dropping below freezing. Summers are warm, with slight droughts that condition the flora of the park. The average temperature is of 11 °C (52 °F).

== Fauna ==
The park's climate, varied vegetation and isolation allow a rich wildlife, including various raptorial birds such as hawks, booted eagles, short toed snake eagles, Egyptian vultures, and more. The park is notably home to Spain's largest population of the middle spotted woodpecker. There are also aquatic mammals like the otter, the Pyrenean desman, the European mink, and common terrestrial mammals such as the fox, the wildcat and the beech marten. Notable amphibians of the park include the Spanish painted frog, the agile frog, and the alpine newt.

== Flora ==
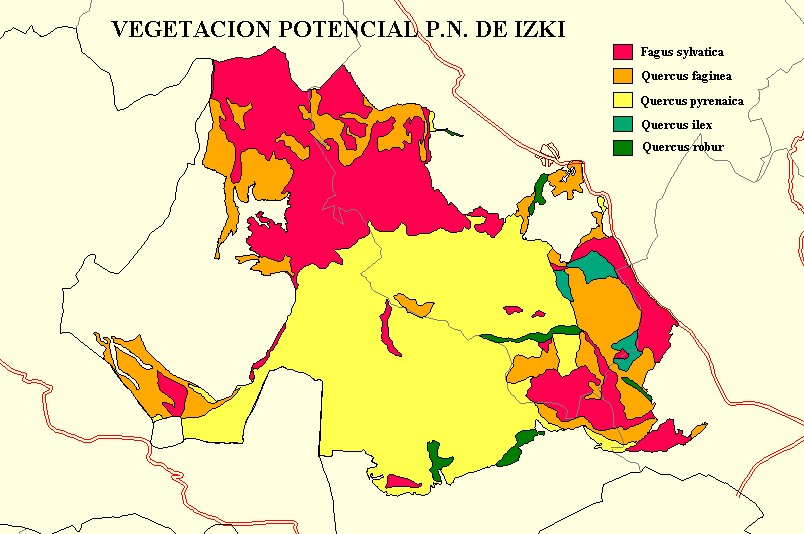
Map of vegetation

Even if the intense and ancient exploitation of the valley's resources has weakened the forest, Europe's largest Quercus pyrenaica woods, with an area of 3,500 hectares (8,600 acres) or 47.94% of the forest, are found in the park. The forest is built over the silicon substrate based and well-drained sandy substrates in the plains of the valley originated by the Berron and the Izki Rivers. The half-Mediterranean half-Atlantic climate in conjunction with the hard insolation and the atmospheric dryness give these species an ecological edge over beech trees.

There are wide areas of beech forest in the higher zones that take an 2.003-hectare (4.95-acre) area representing 27,45% of the park's forests. It stands on neutral or moderately acidic soils rich in carbonates. There are also some spots of acidophile beeches interspersed in the valley.

Portuguese oaks can be found near the humid sectors around the rivers and acquire their maximum splendor in the limestone areas between the villages of Korres and Bujanda and also around Arlucea. As they are young trees their conservation is precarious. These trees are typical in subhumid climates with a 600–900 mm (24–35 in) per year precipitation and short summer droughts. As they need to stand in a fresh ground with a good liquid retention capacity, they usually occupy clayey and marly grounds. Under 650 m (2,130 ft) the Portuguese oak is substituted by the Mediterranean oaks. Groups of downy oaks, field maples and European hollys can also be found. The oaks are the wood's 15.35% occupying an area of 1.12 hectares (2.8 acres).

It is important to mention the existence of silver birch, English oak and holm oak populations in the valley that while there are not many they are important for remarking the ecologic and landscape interests the park has.

== Mountain and trekking ==
Due to the natural diversity and the slopes the terrain has the park offers many trekking paths for appreciation of the landscapes.

- The ascension from San Roman to the Muela mountain. - The ascension from Antoñana to Soila through a forest allows viewing most of the mentioned tree varieties and a couple of especially wide and old lime-trees and yew-trees. - The cliffs in Korres and Bujanda. - The ascension from Marquinez to the Belabia mountain and the visit to the artificial caves. - The tour from Apellaniz to Arlucea passing through the San Justi and the San Cristóbal mountains. - The ascension of the Azaceta mountain pass to Kapildui.
