= Legarda, Álava =

Hamlet in Álava, Spain

Legarda
- Concejo
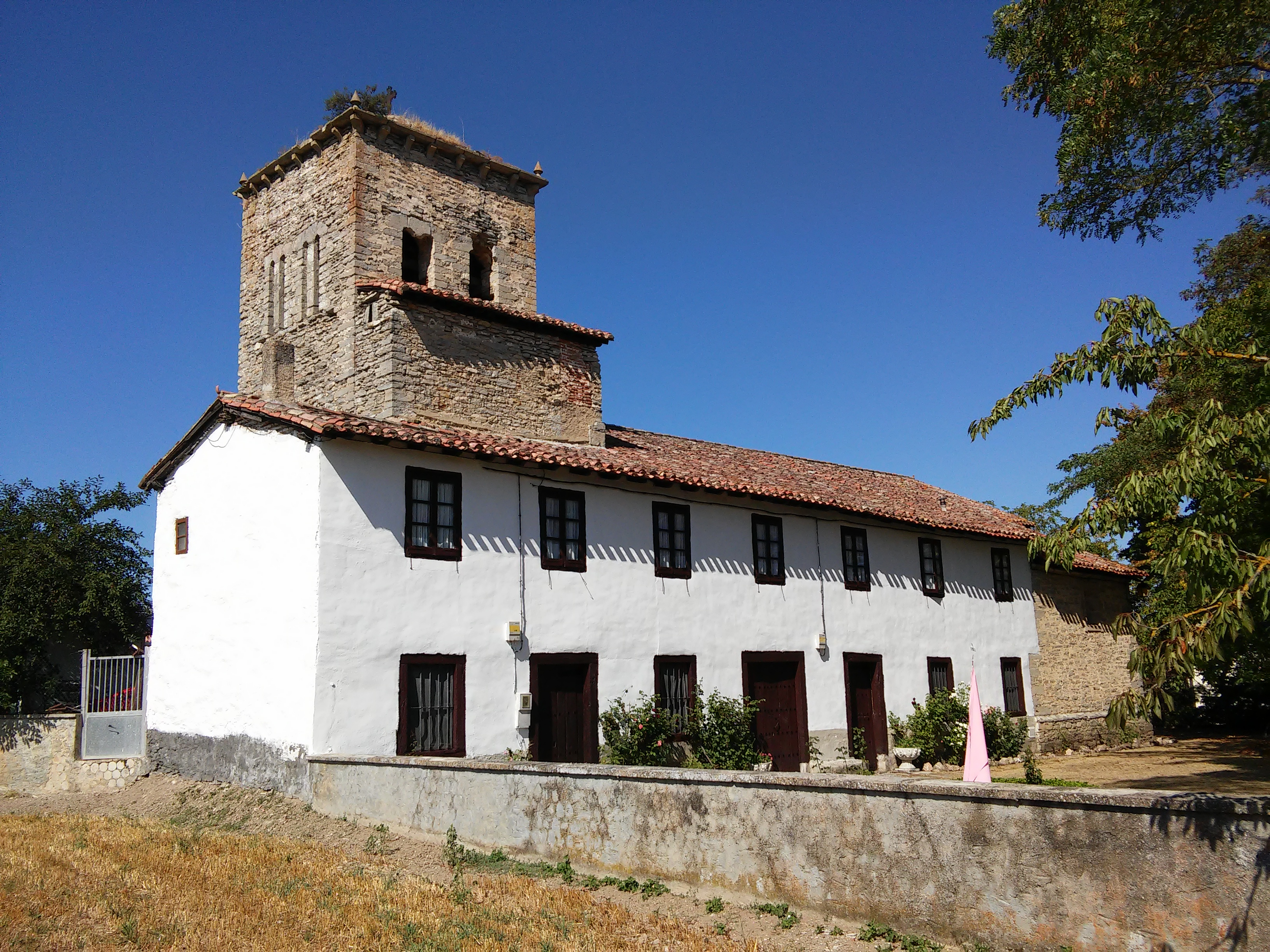
- The parish church of Legarda

- Location within Álava Location within the Basque Country Location within Spain
- Coordinates: 42°53′35″N 2°44′15″W
- Country: Spain
- Autonomous community: Basque Country
- Province: Álava
- Comarca: Vitoria-Gasteiz
- Municipality: Vitoria-Gasteiz

Area
  - Total: 9.63 km^{2} (3.72 sq mi)
- Elevation: 526 m (1,726 ft)

Population (2023)
  - Total: 62
  - Density: 6.4/km^{2} (17/sq mi)
- Postal code: 01196

Legarda is a hamlet and concejo in the municipality of Vitoria-Gasteiz, Álava province, Basque Country, Spain. The hamlets of Artatza Foronda and Mandojana are also part of the concejo.
