= Treviño =

Municipality in Spain

- Minor local entity
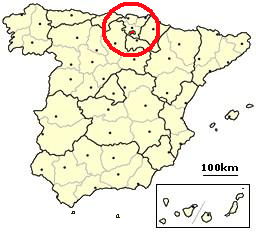
- Location of Condado de Treviño in Spain. Treviño is the capital of Condado de Treviño.

- Location in Spain
- Coordinates: 42°44′5″N 2°44′50″W
- Country: Spain
- Autonomous community: Castile and León
- Province: Burgos
- Comarca: Ebro
- Municipality: Condado de Treviño

Government
  - Alcalde: Roberto Bajos Argote (pedáneo)

Population (2008)
  - Total: 202
- Time zone: UTC+1 (CET)
  - Summer (DST): UTC+2 (CEST)
- Official language(s): Spanish

Treviño (in Basque: Trebiñu) is the capital of the municipality Condado de Treviño, province of Burgos, in the autonomous community of Castile and León, Spain. The Condado de Treviño and the geographically smaller La Puebla de Arganzón make up the enclave of Treviño. Although the enclave is part of Burgos (and, hence, part of the autonomous community of Castile and León) it is surrounded by the province of Álava, part of the autonomous community of the Basque Country. Hence, properly speaking, the enclave of Treviño is an enclave within Álava, and an exclave of Burgos.

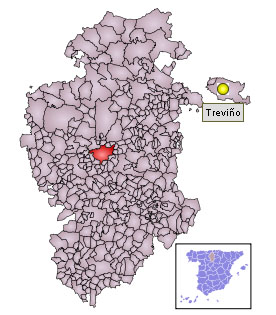
The location of Treviño in the province of Burgos

== History ==
An abundance of prehistoric remains testify that the Condado de Treviño has been inhabited since ancient times. In pre-Roman times, the Varduls, Caristios and Autrigones all lived here at one time or another, attesting to the region's strategic importance.

At the beginning of the 11th century, Alavese comarcas of the river Ivita began to be established, in the basin of what is now known as the River Ayuda, a tributary of the Zadorra, between the Montes de Vitoria to the north and the Sierra de Toloño and other ranges of the Sierra de Cantabria to the south.

The earliest surviving written record of the comarca Rigo de Ivita is in a document from 1025, the Reja de San Millán which has been transcribed into the Cartulary of San Millán de la Cogolla. The notation "XXXV regas" next to the name has been claimed to refer to "irrigated fields" (an etymology from the Spanish regar "to irrigate"). More likely regas means iron bars (Spanish: rejas) given that the word occurs in the context of ferro (iron). Anyhow, the cartulary implies a place of major importance.

=== Foundation of the city of Treviño ===
The name Treviño may stem from Trifinium, postulated as Latin for 'boundary of the three tribes'.

Treviño itself was founded by Navarrese king Sancho VI ("the Wise") no later than 1161; some authors say as early as 1151. The date is indeterminate because the text of the fuero is not preserved, but it would clearly have been founded in the same period as the nearby Puebla de Arganzón and Vitoria-Gasteiz. The royal foundation indicates that at that time the region was controlled by the kings of Navarre, not of Castile.

=== Rule by Castile ===
After the comarca was conquered in 1199–1200 by Alfonso VIII of Castile, it retained the name of Ivita, Ibidam, or Uda and continued to be identified as a specific part of the land of Álava, as is clearly indicated in De rebus Hispaniae by archbishop Rodrigo Jiménez de Rada. Gradually, the predominance of the town that develops based on fueros granted by Alfonso X of Castile in 1254 supplants the old comarcal name; the area comes to be referred to as de Treviño rather than de Uda, although for about a century the town is known as Treviño de Uda.

Following its incorporation into Castile, a good portion of Álava was organized into behetrías, at least nominally choosing their own local leader. However, Treviño and Vitoria were not included in this plan, remained directly under the control of the monarch as part of the royal seigneury. In 1332, at the Campo de Arriaga the Brotherhood of Álava formally recognized the royal seigneury over Treviño and its surrounding territories.

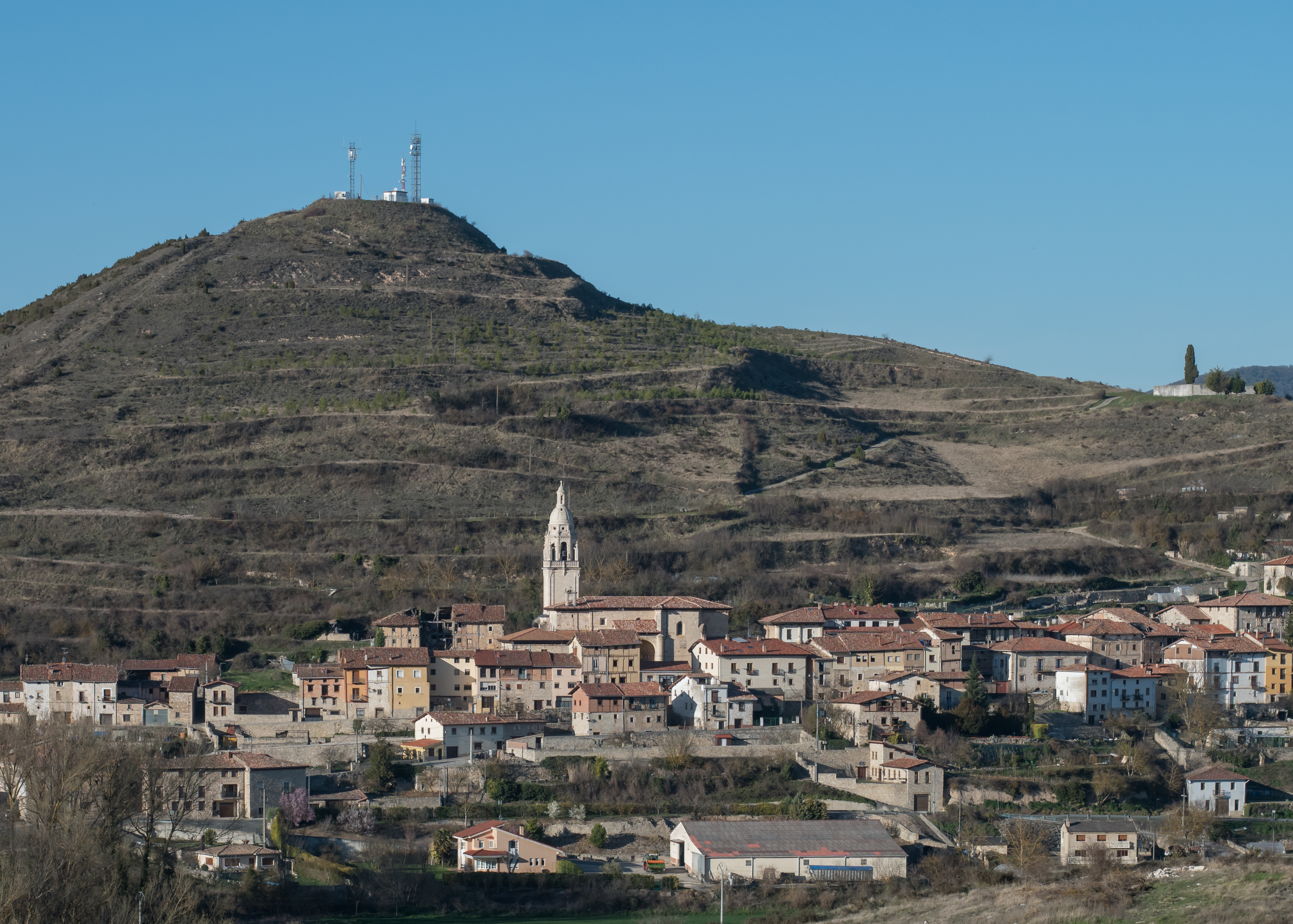
View of Treviño

On 8 April 1366, Henry II of Castile ceded to Pedro Manrique I de Lara, for services rendered, a seigneury consisting of Treviño de Uda and its outlying villages. In 1453 it became the Condado de Treviño when Gómez Manrique (great-grandson of Pedro Manrique) was given the title of count. The Catholic Monarchs would later (in 1482) grant the title of Duke of Nájera to Gómez Manrique's son Pedro Manrique de Lara, a title that continues in the family down to the present day. In the 16th century these counts of Treviño, dukes de Nájera, would build a palace at Treviño, which is now the ayuntamiento (town hall) of the municipality.

Thus Treviño found itself generally left to its own devices as the seat of a noble family, sitting in the middle of Álava, surrounded by communities operating under the more egalitarian fueros typical of the Basque Country.

== Annual festivals and events ==
- The Fiesta of San Juan Bautista, the patron saint of Treviño proper, is celebrated 24 June. When that falls on a weekday, some of the festivities take place on the nearest weekend.
- Feria de las Moscas ("Fly Fair") The first Sunday in July, unless that falls on 1 July, in which case the fair takes place 8 July.
- The pilgrimage of San Formerio, the patron saint of Condado de Treviño, place on the Sunday closest to 25 September. The Hermitage of San Formerio is in Pangua, Condado de Treviño.
