= Miñano Mayor =

Hamlet in Álava, Spain

Miñao/Miñano Mayor
- Concejo
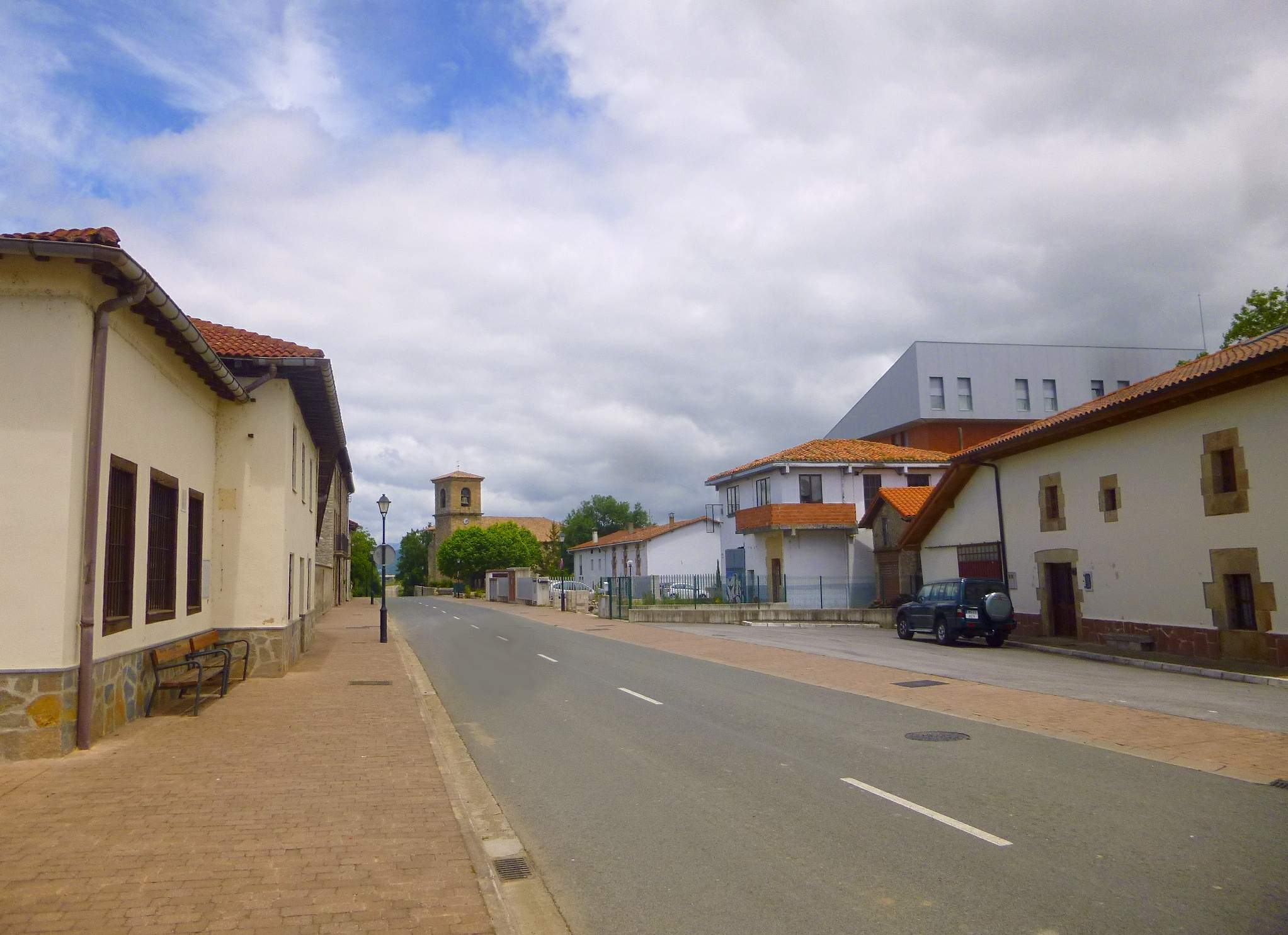

- Location within Álava Location within the Basque Country Location within Spain
- Coordinates: 42°55′01″N 2°38′44″W
- Country: Spain
- Autonomous community: Basque Country
- Province: Álava
- Comarca: Vitoria-Gasteiz
- Municipality: Vitoria-Gasteiz

Area
  - Total: 4.98 km^{2} (1.92 sq mi)
- Elevation: 528 m (1,732 ft)

Population (2023)
  - Total: 101
  - Density: 20.3/km^{2} (52.5/sq mi)
- Postal code: 01510

Miñano Mayor (Spanish pronunciation: [miˈɲano maˈʝoɾ]) or Miñao (Basque pronunciation: [miɲao]) is a hamlet and concejo in the municipality of Vitoria-Gasteiz, in Álava province, Basque Country, Spain.
