= Gobeo =

Hamlet in Álava, Spain

- Concejo
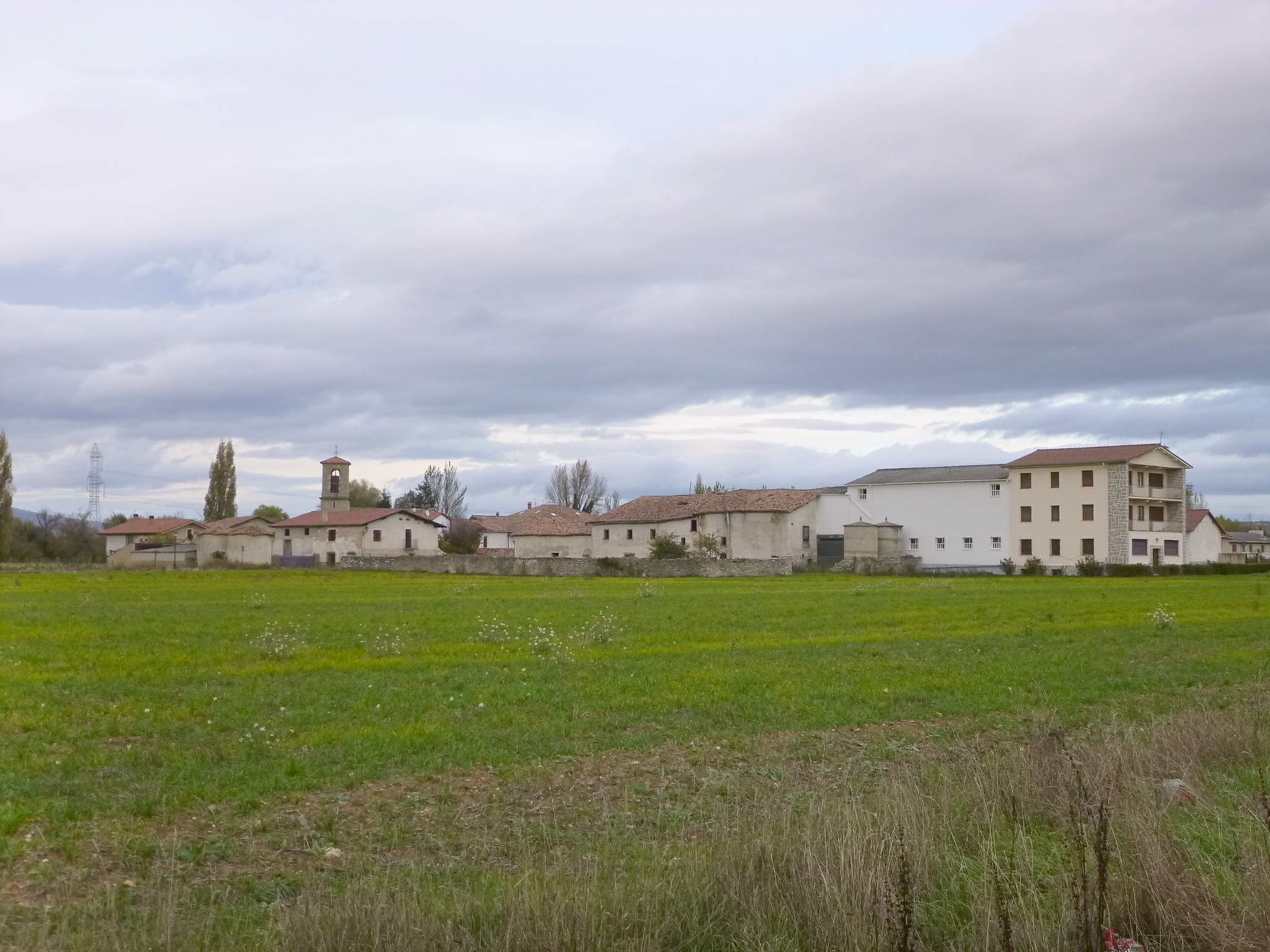
- View of Gobeo

- Coat of arms

- Location within Álava Location within the Basque Country Location within Spain
- Coordinates: 42°51′49″N 2°42′58″W
- Country: Spain
- Autonomous community: Basque Country
- Province: Álava
- Comarca: Vitoria-Gasteiz
- Municipality: Vitoria-Gasteiz
- Elevation: 504 m (1,654 ft)

Population (2023)
  - Total: 32
- Postal code: 01191

Gobeo (Basque: Gobeu) is a hamlet and concejo in the municipality of Vitoria-Gasteiz, in Álava province, Basque Country, Spain.
