= Izki (disambiguation) =

Izki may refer to:

- Izki, a town in Oman
- Izki, Iran, a village in Iran
- Izki (river), a river in Basque Country, Spain
