= Lasarte, Álava =

Village in Álava, Spain

Lasarte
- Concejo
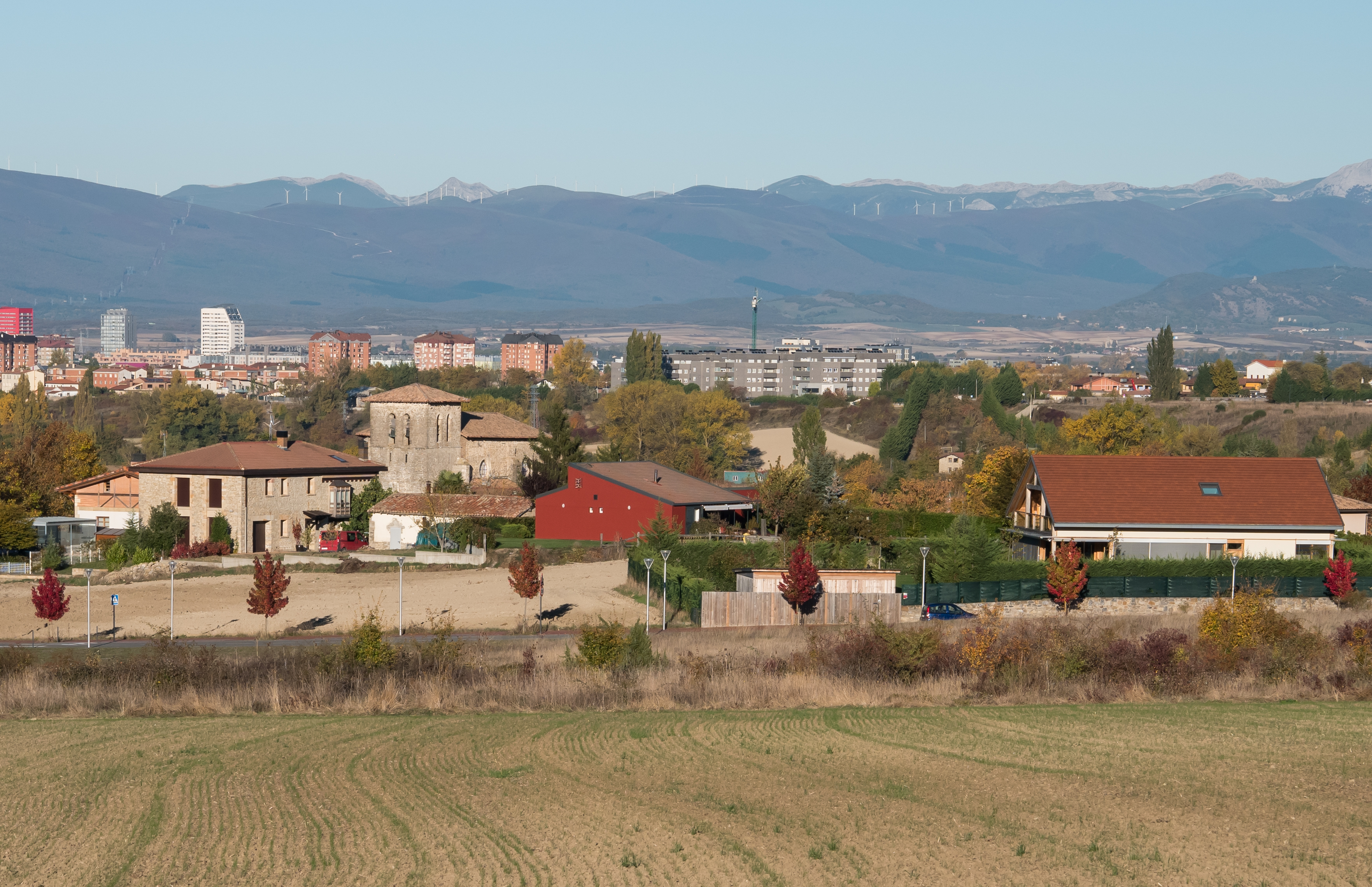
- View of Lasarte

- Location within Álava Location within the Basque Country Location within Spain
- Coordinates: 42°49′08″N 2°41′26″W
- Country: Spain
- Autonomous community: Basque Country
- Province: Álava
- Comarca: Vitoria-Gasteiz
- Municipality: Vitoria-Gasteiz
- Elevation: 569 m (1,867 ft)

Population (2023)
  - Total: 288
- Postal code: 01194

Lasarte is a village and concejo in the municipality of Vitoria-Gasteiz, Álava province, Basque Country, Spain.

== History ==
Lasarte was donated in 1135 by Sancho de Funes, bishop of Calahorra, to the archdeacon of Armentia. During this time viticulture flourished in the area. In 1286 Sancho IV of Castile transferred Lasarte from the Brotherhood of Arriaga to the city of Vitoria. After the dissolution of the Brotherhood in 1332 the Junta de Francos Infanzones de Lasarte, an assembly of the third estate, held its meetings in Lasarte.

== Heritage ==
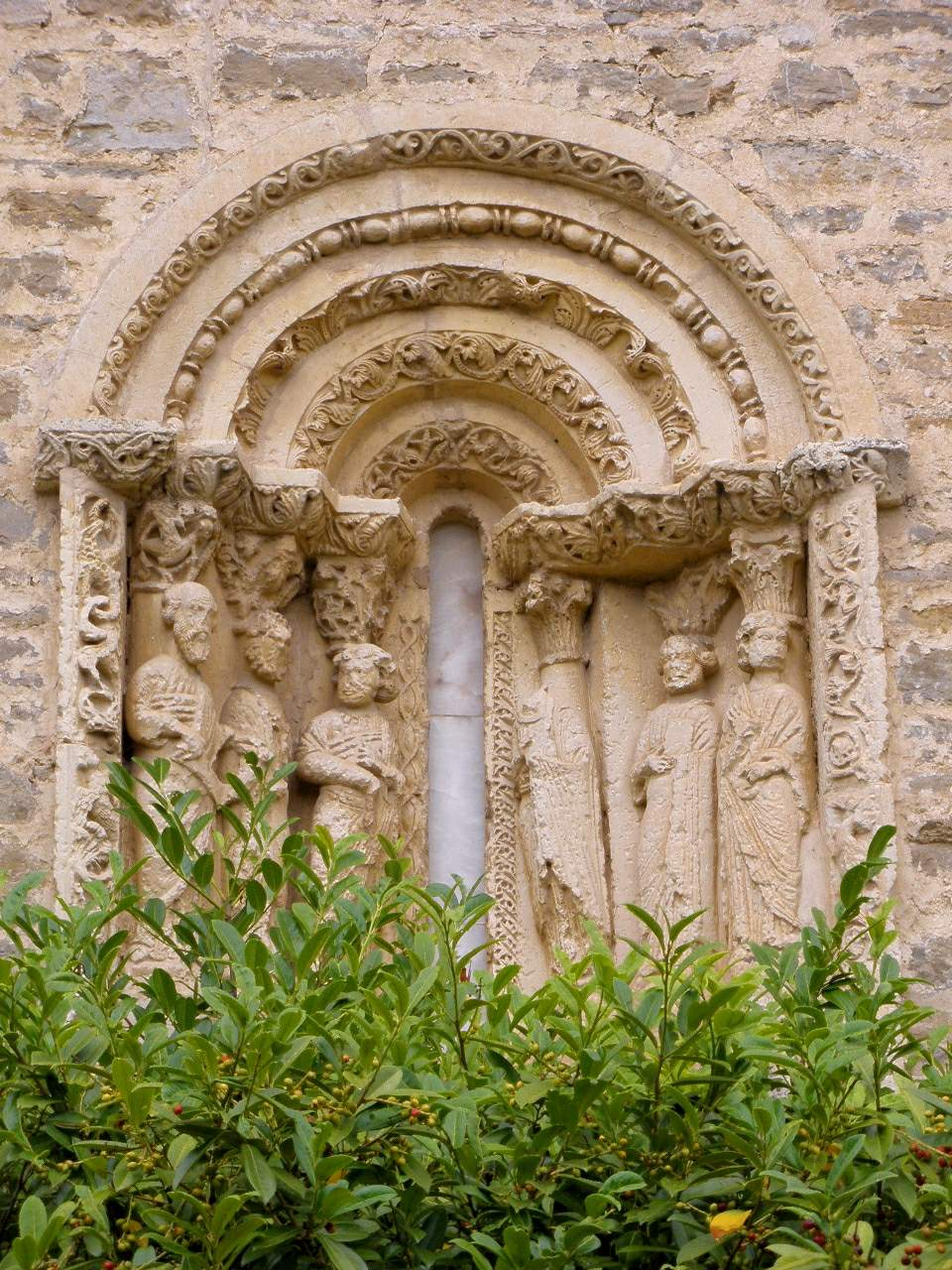
Romanesque window of the parish church of Lasarte

The most notable building in Lasarte is the Church of Nuestra Señora de la Asunción. Originally built between the late 12th and early 13th centuries, its only Romanesque remains are the windows, the baptismal font and some interior decorations. The rest of the church dates from the 16th century. It was declared Bien de Interés Cultural in 1931. The altarpiece was built in the 1970s by Nestor Basterretxea.
