= Miñano Menor =

Hamlet in Álava, Spain

Miñano Menor/Miñao Gutxia
- Concejo
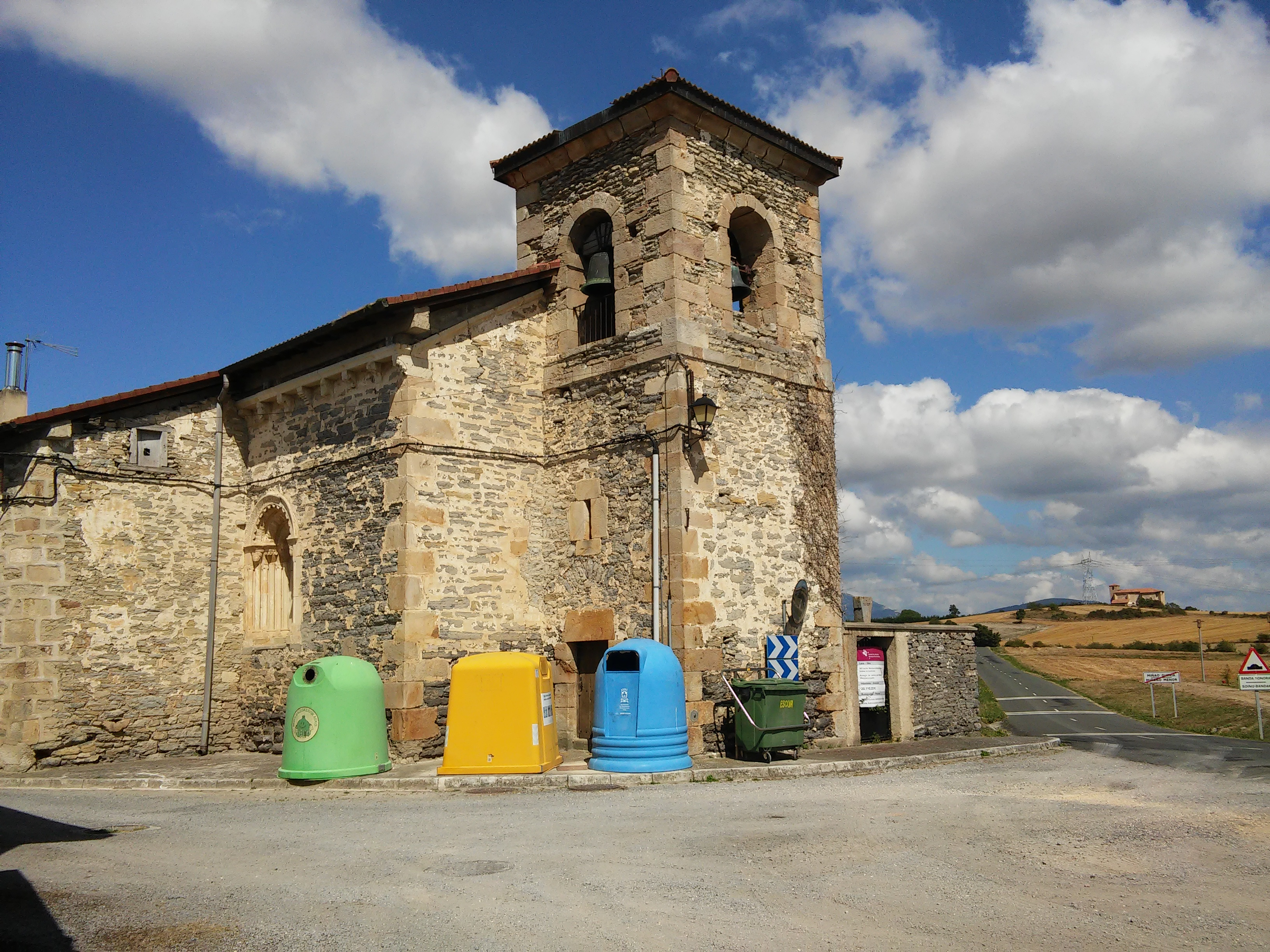
- Church of San Vicente Mártir

- Location within Álava Location within the Basque Country Location within Spain
- Coordinates: 42°55′25″N 2°40′07″W
- Country: Spain
- Autonomous community: Basque Country
- Province: Álava
- Comarca: Vitoria-Gasteiz
- Municipality: Vitoria-Gasteiz

Area
  - Total: 2.62 km^{2} (1.01 sq mi)
- Elevation: 551 m (1,808 ft)

Population (2023)
  - Total: 25
  - Density: 9.5/km^{2} (25/sq mi)
- Postal code: 01510

Miñano Menor (Spanish pronunciation: [miˈɲano meˈnoɾ]) or Miñao Gutxia (Basque pronunciation: [miɲao ɣutʃi.a]) is a hamlet and concejo in the municipality of Vitoria-Gasteiz, in Álava province, Basque Country, Spain.
