= Otazu, Álava =

Hamlet in Álava, Spain

Otazu
- Concejo
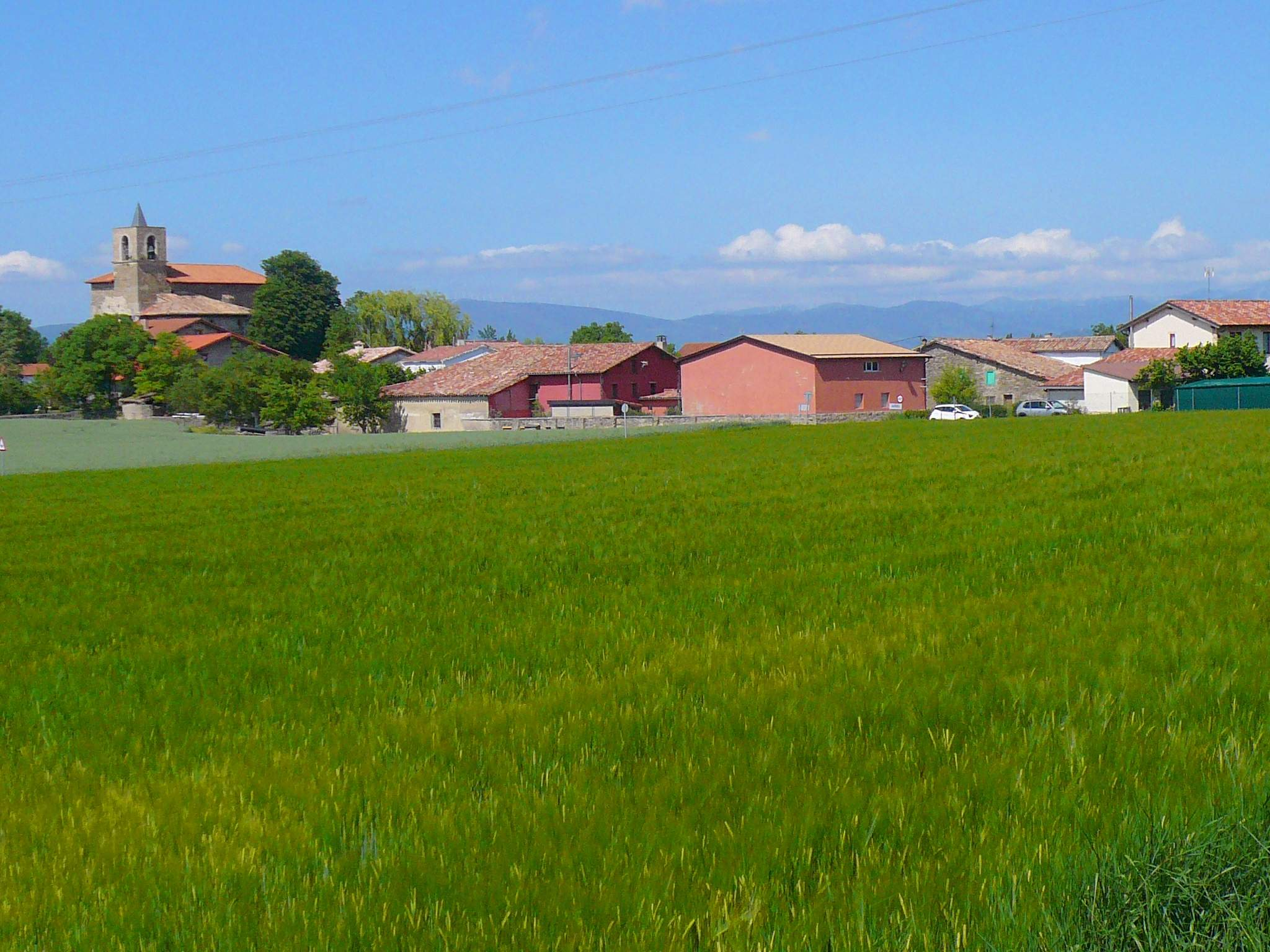
- View of Otazu

- Location within Álava Location within the Basque Country Location within Spain
- Coordinates: 42°49′54″N 2°37′41″W
- Country: Spain
- Autonomous community: Basque Country
- Province: Álava
- Comarca: Vitoria-Gasteiz
- Municipality: Vitoria-Gasteiz

Area
  - Total: 4.02 km^{2} (1.55 sq mi)
- Elevation: 545 m (1,788 ft)

Population (2023)
  - Total: 88
  - Density: 22/km^{2} (57/sq mi)
- Postal code: 01194

Otazu is a hamlet and concejo in the municipality of Vitoria-Gasteiz, in Álava province, Basque Country, Spain.
