= Artatza Foronda =

Hamlet in Álava, Spain

- Hamlet
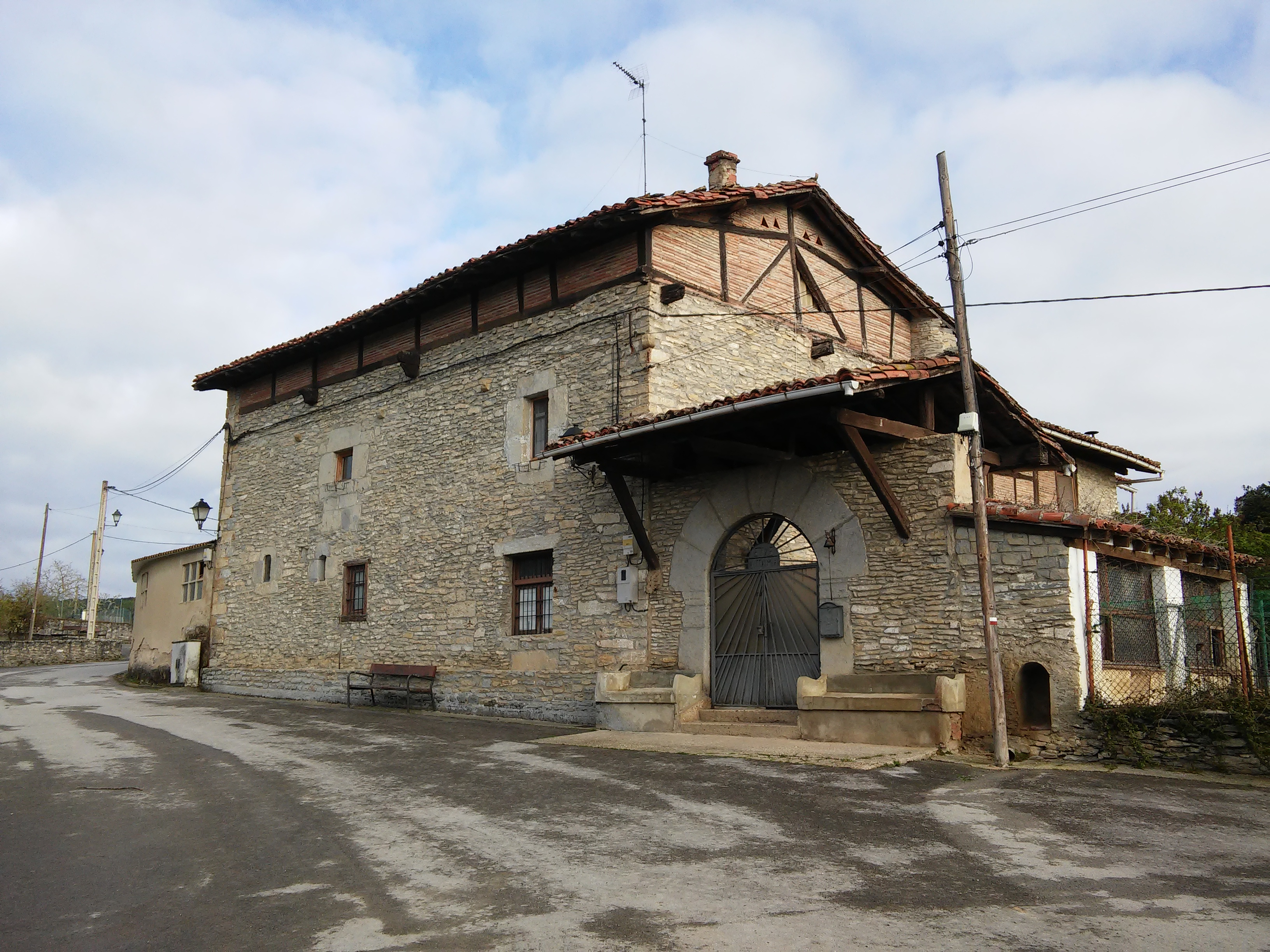

- Location within Álava Location within the Basque Country Location within Spain
- Coordinates: 42°54′08″N 2°44′33″W
- Country: Spain
- Autonomous community: Basque Country
- Province: Álava
- Comarca: Vitoria-Gasteiz
- Municipality: Vitoria-Gasteiz
- Concejo: Legarda
- Elevation: 564 m (1,850 ft)

Population (2021)
  - Total: 6
- Postal code: 01196

Artatza Foronda (Basque pronunciation: [artats̻a foɾonda], Spanish: Artaza de Foronda [aɾˈtaθa ðe foˈɾonda]) is a hamlet located in the municipality of Vitoria-Gasteiz, in Álava province, Basque Country, Spain. It is part of the concejo of Legarda.
