= Gardelegi dump =

The Gardelegi dump is the municipal dump of Vitoria-Gasteiz in the Spanish province of Álava. It is located 4 kilometres (2.5 mi) south of the capital. It is as large as 52 football pitches, and it stores the non-biodegradable materials of the area. It is named for the nearby village of Gardelegi.

== History ==
The Gardelegi dump opened in 1973. Initially, it was used by construction companies. In 1986, Gardelegi dump was declared the municipal dump of Vitoria-Gasteiz. The Onandia Company fenced the area and constructed a building to control the scraps.

The dump was improved over the years, but the most important work was done in 2003: the dump was expanded and a recycling plant was incorporated. The equipment for the plant, the biggest in Spain, cost more than seven million euros; it recycles rubbish before taking the remainder to the Gardelegi dump.

In 2011 Gasteiz mayor Patxi Lazcoz expanded Gardlegi dump again: the buildings were improved, and the dump adopted new methods for security and protection of the environment. The upgrade cost more than five million euros.

== Activity of the dump ==
The Gardelegi dump and la Avenida de los Huetos are the biggest dumps of Álava. In 2010, the dumps received more than 2,200 tonnes (2,400 short tons) of waste during the year, 150 tonnes (170 short tons) more than in 2009. The dumps collect all types of materials, from rubble and metals to brown and white goods, but the most common material is wood: in both dumps, half of their space is full of wood.

== Social situation ==
Since the Gardelegi dump was built, opponents have criticized it for causing health problems, excessive cost and ecological damage. Some residents from Vitoria-Gasteiz have asked for the closure of the place.

== See also ==
- Green capital award 2012
