= Castillo, Álava =

Hamlet in Álava, Spain

Castillo/Gaztelu
- Concejo
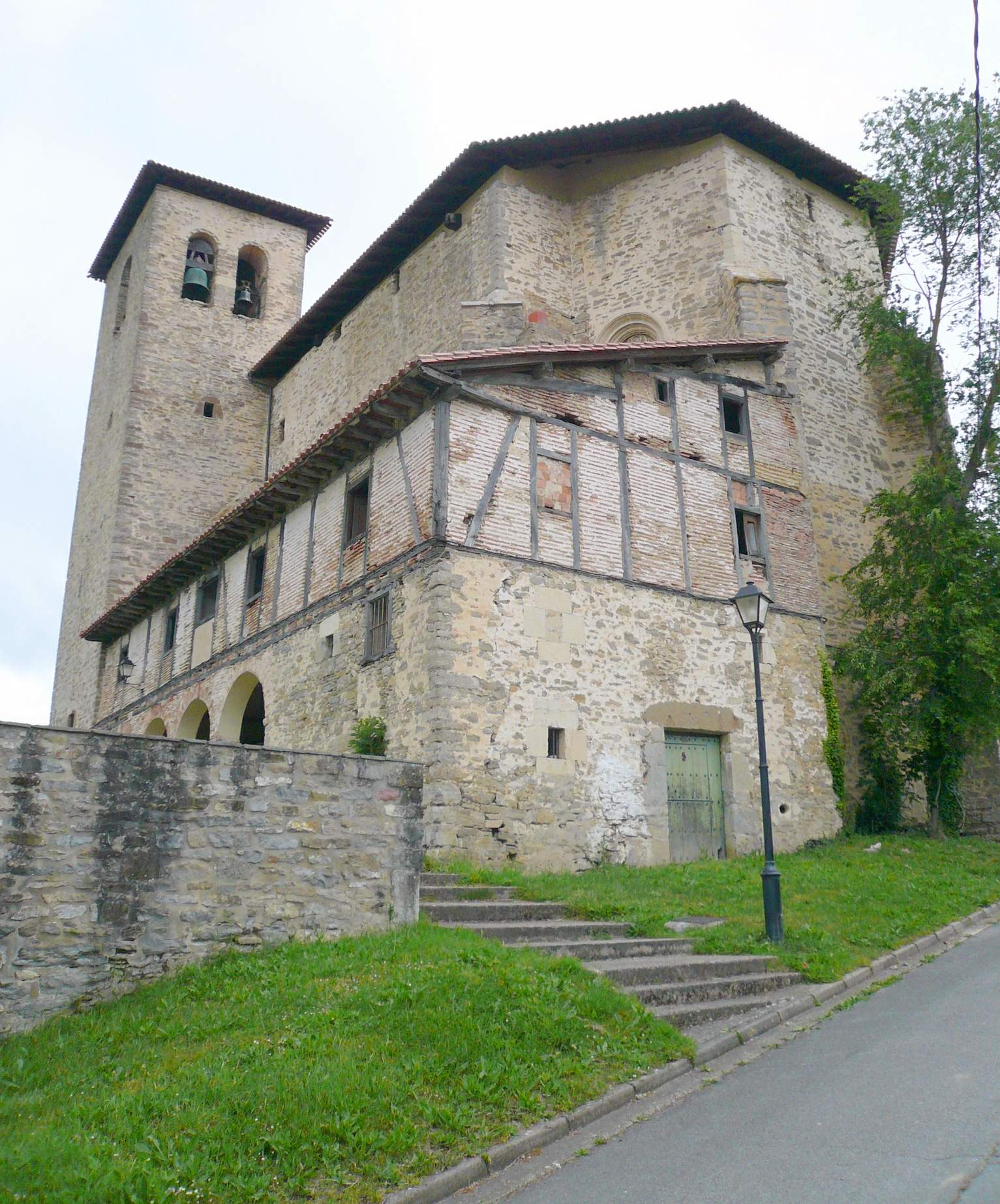
- Church of San Martín

- Coat of arms

- Location within Álava Location within the Basque Country Location within Spain
- Coordinates: 42°48′21″N 2°40′06″W
- Country: Spain
- Autonomous community: Basque Country
- Province: Álava
- Comarca: Vitoria-Gasteiz
- Municipality: Vitoria-Gasteiz
- Elevation: 663 m (2,175 ft)

Population (2022)
  - Total: 65
- Postal code: 01194

Castillo (Spanish pronunciation: [kasˈtiʝo]) or Gaztelu (Basque pronunciation: [gas̻telu]) is a hamlet and concejo located in the municipality of Vitoria-Gasteiz, in Álava province, Basque Country, Spain.
