= Arriaga, Álava =

Depopulated hamlet in Álava, Spain

Arriaga
- Hamlet
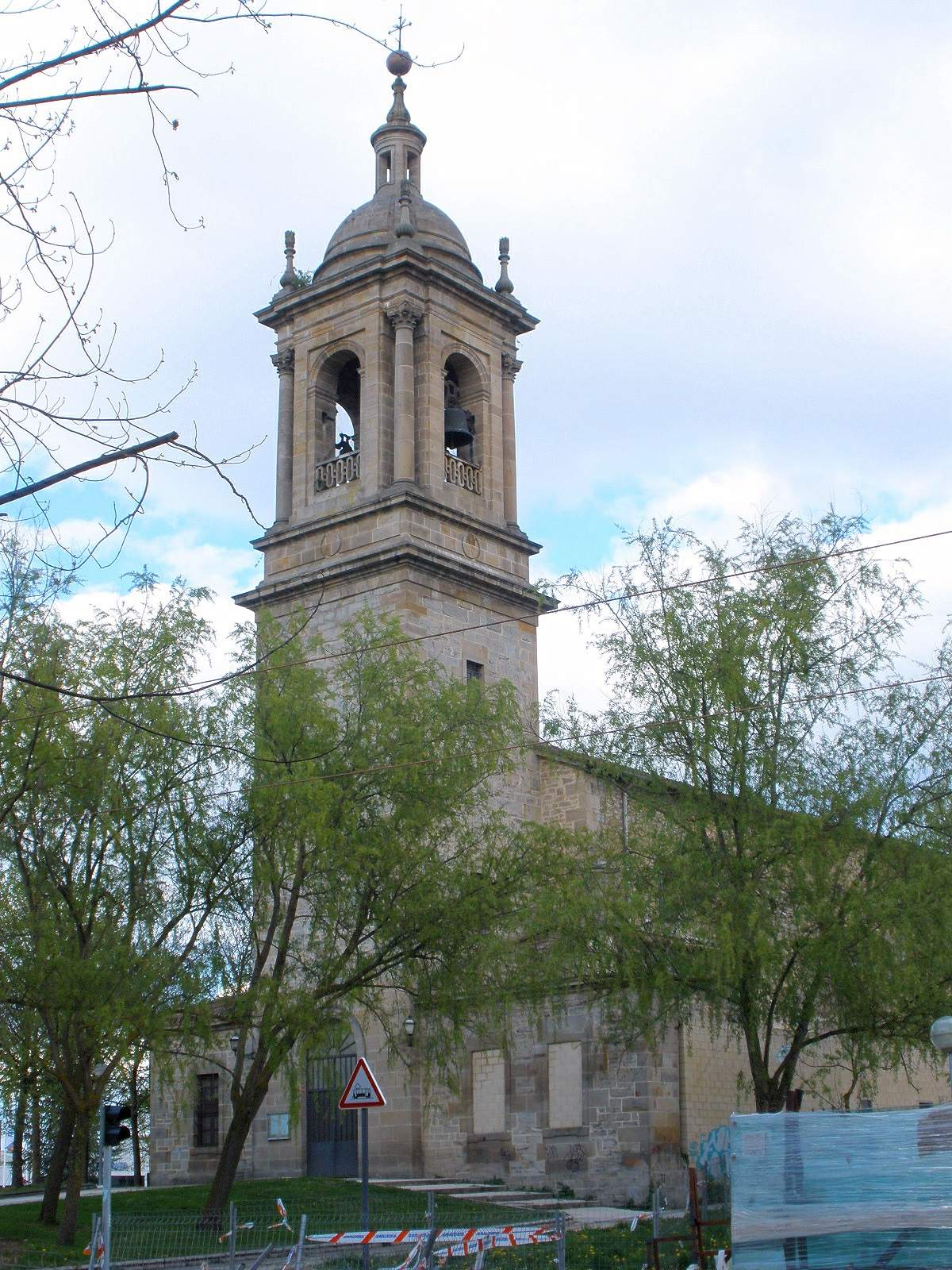
- Parish church of Arriaga

- Coat of arms

- Location within Álava Location within the Basque Country Location within Spain
- Coordinates: 42°52′00″N 2°40′48″W
- Country: Spain
- Autonomous community: Basque Country
- Province: Álava
- Comarca: Vitoria-Gasteiz
- Municipality: Vitoria-Gasteiz
- Elevation: 516 m (1,693 ft)

Population (2022)
  - Total: 0

Arriaga is a former hamlet and concejo in the municipality of Vitoria-Gasteiz, province of Álava, Basque Country, Spain. It has been absorbed into the city and is now part of the neighborhood of Lakua-Arriaga.

== History ==
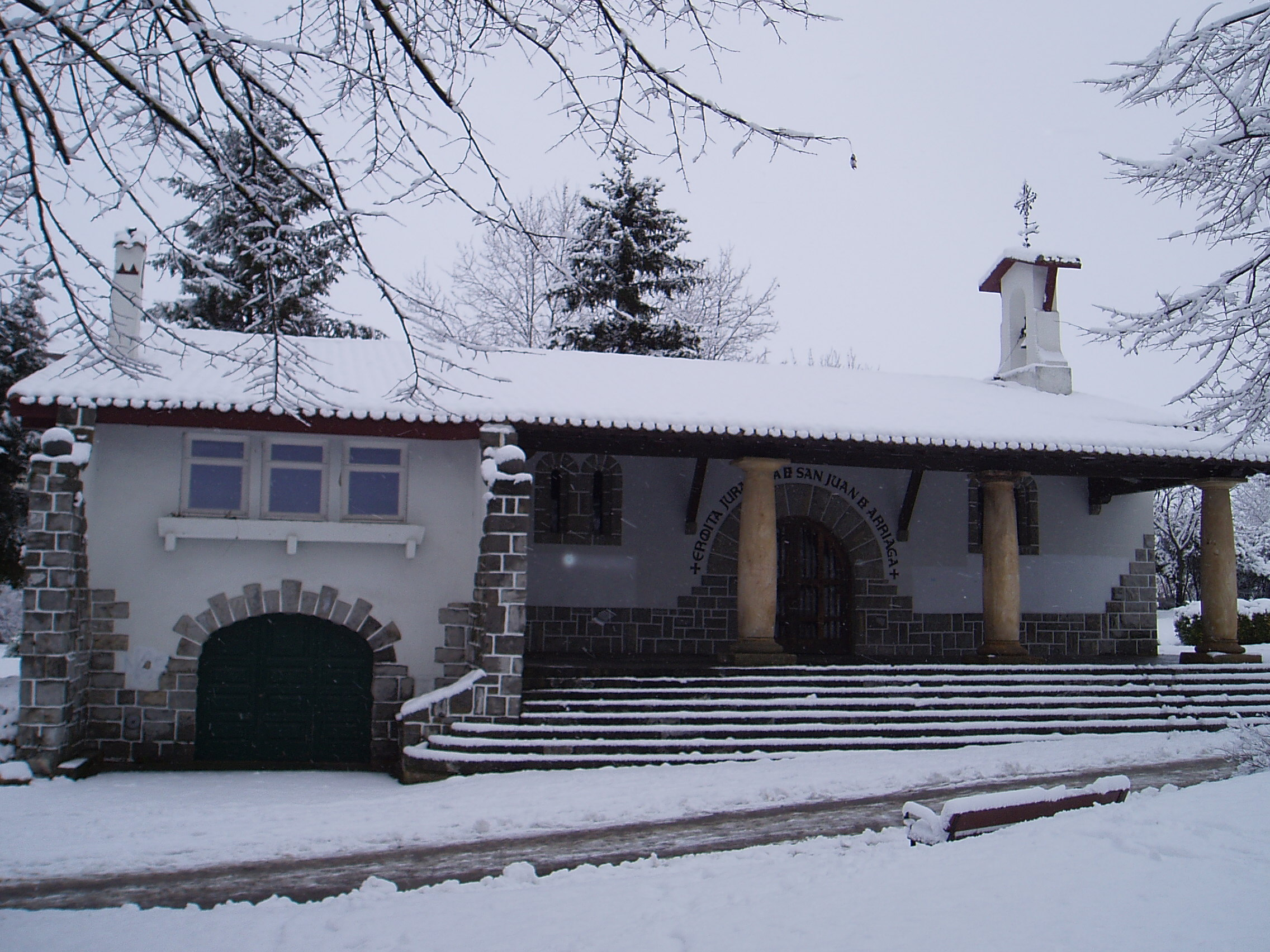
Chapel of San Juan de Arriaga

The first written reference to Arriaga is found in the Reja de San Millán of 1025, a document from the cartulary of the Monasteries of San Millán de la Cogolla.

The village was notable for its proximity to the Campo de Arriaga (Spanish for 'Arriaga Field'), where the institutions that ruled Álava conducted meetings. The Brotherhood of Arriaga, as it came to be known, existed until its dissolution in 1332. Arriaga came under the jurisdiction of Vitoria-Gasteiz already in 1258, when the Brotherhood of Arriaga relinquished several hamlets to Alfonso XI, in exchange of keeping their privileges. Despite this, Arriaga continued to host the meetings of the brotherhood. In 1813, during the Battle of Vitoria, there was fighting in Arriaga for control of the bridge over the Zadorra.

The construction of the modern neighborhood of Lakua-Arriaga started in the 1970s. The area has since been fully integrated into the city. Aside from the parish church, only two buildings remain in the location of the hamlet. The hamlet has been officially depopulated since 2003. Due to this, the Foral Deputation of Álava initiated in 2016 the process to dissolve the concejo. However, as of 2023, Arriaga was still listed as a concejo. In March 2024, the city of Vitoria-Gasteiz initiated the procedure to formally dissolve the concejo of Arriaga. The dissolution was completed in June 2025 with a vote of the General Assembly of Álava.

== Heritage ==
- The Church of San Vicente de Arriaga was probably built during the late fifteenth and early sixteenth centuries. It was substantially reformed by Olaguíbel in the eighteenth century.
- The Chapel of San Juan de Arriaga was the place where members of the Brotherhood of Arriaga swore their oaths. The current building dates from the 1940s.
