= Gardelegi =

Hamlet in Álava, Spain

- Concejo
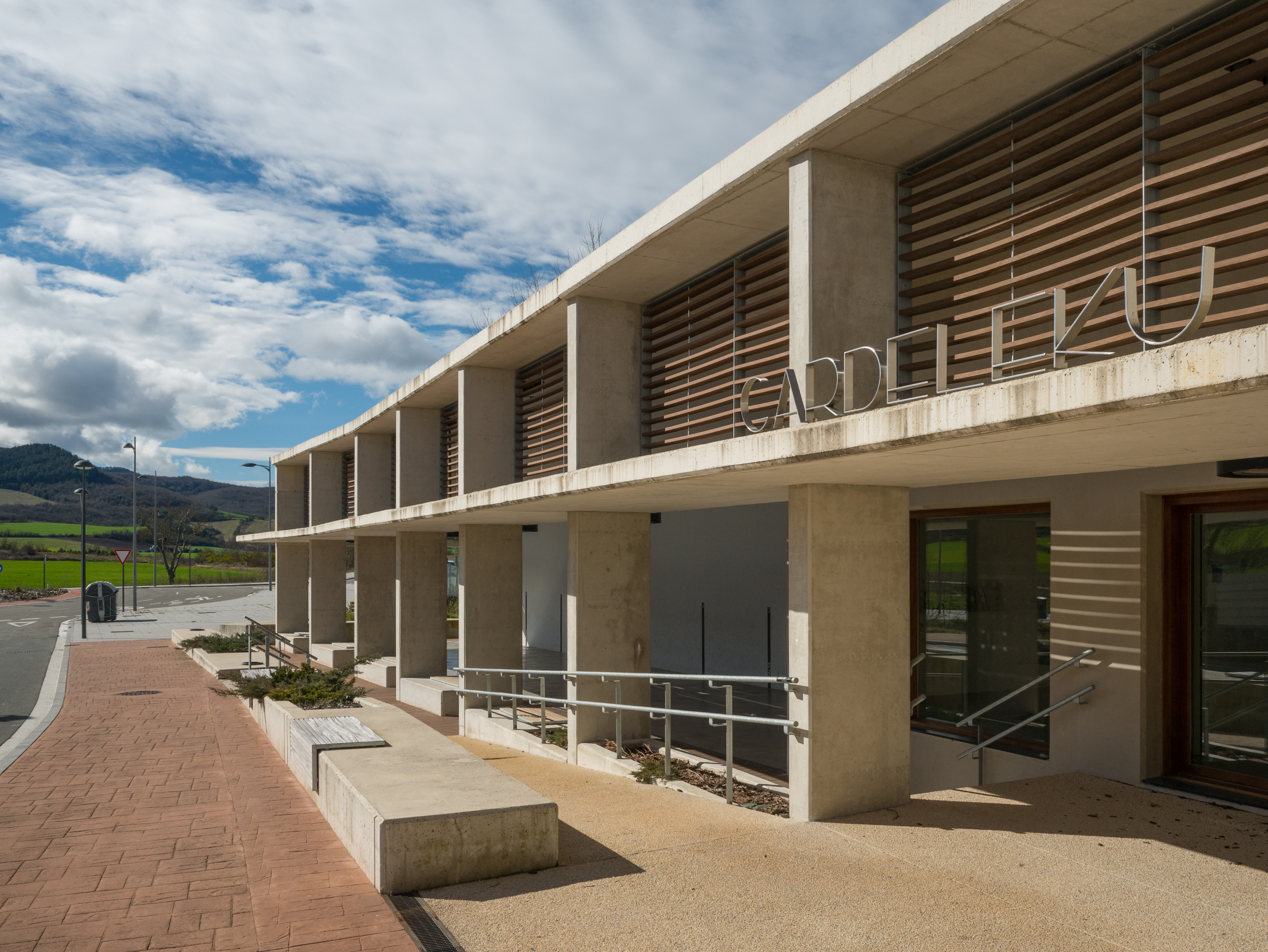

- Location within Álava Location within the Basque Country Location within Spain
- Coordinates: 42°49′24″N 2°40′37″W
- Country: Spain
- Autonomous community: Basque Country
- Province: Álava
- Comarca: Vitoria-Gasteiz
- Municipality: Vitoria-Gasteiz
- Elevation: 572 m (1,877 ft)

Population (2023)
  - Total: 86
- Postal code: 01194

Gardelegi (Spanish: Gardélegui) is a hamlet and concejo in the municipality of Vitoria-Gasteiz, in Álava province, Basque Country, Spain. The municipal dump of Vitoria-Gasteiz is located south of Gardelegi.
