= Aretxabaleta, Álava =

Village in Basque Country, Spain

Aretxabaleta
- Concejo
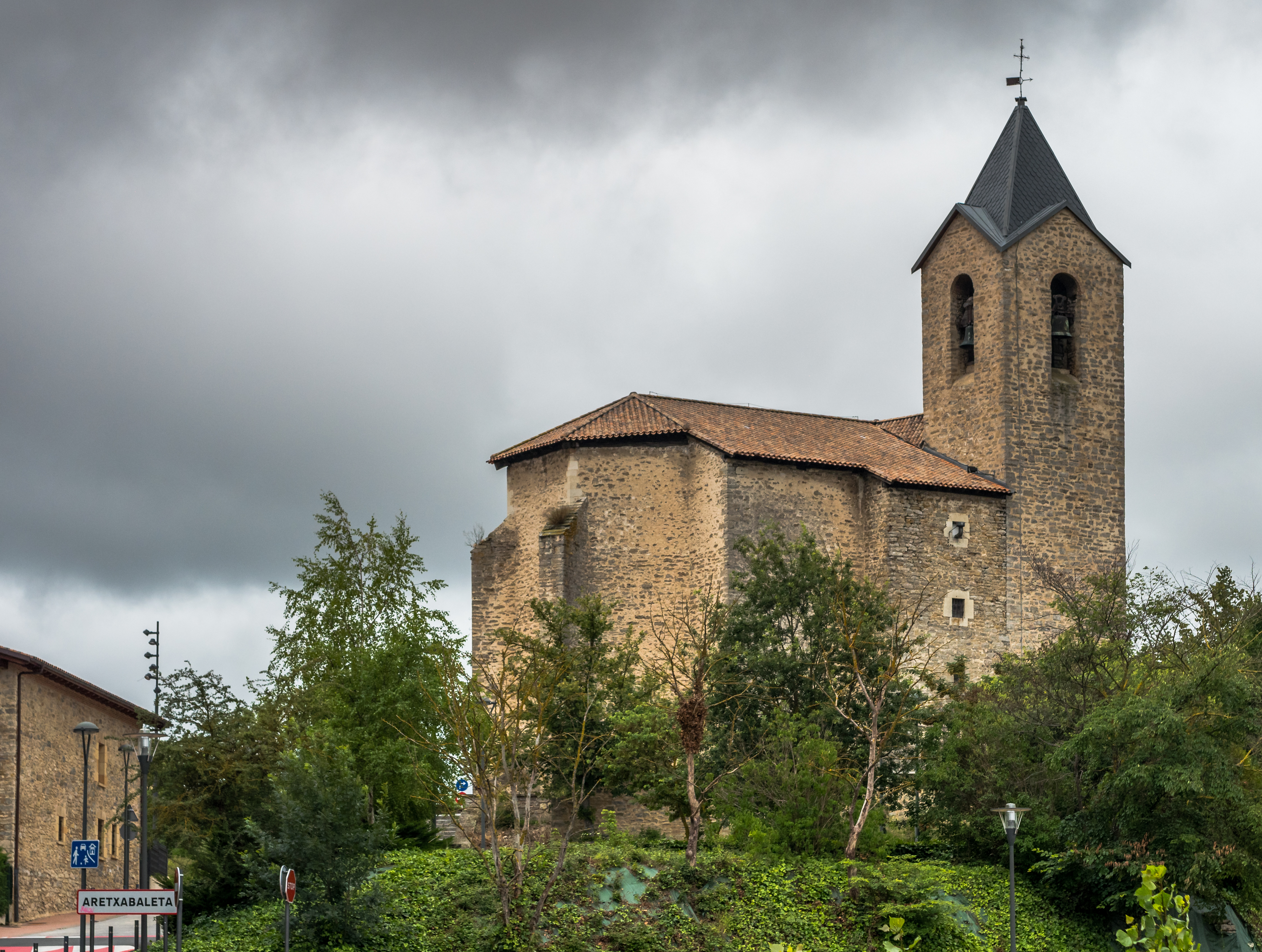
- Church of Aretxabaleta

- Coat of arms

- Location within Álava Location within the Basque Country Location within Spain
- Coordinates: 42°49′55″N 2°40′21″W
- Country: Spain
- Autonomous community: Basque Country
- Province: Álava
- Comarca: Vitoria-Gasteiz
- Municipality: Vitoria-Gasteiz
- Elevation: 554 m (1,818 ft)

Population (2022)
  - Total: 101
- Postal code: 01194

Aretxabaleta (Spanish: Arechavaleta) is a village in Álava, Basque Country, Spain. It is part of the municipality of Vitoria-Gasteiz, in recent decades it has been integrated into the urban area of the city.
