= Mendiola, Álava =

Village in Álava, Spain

Mendiola
- Concejo
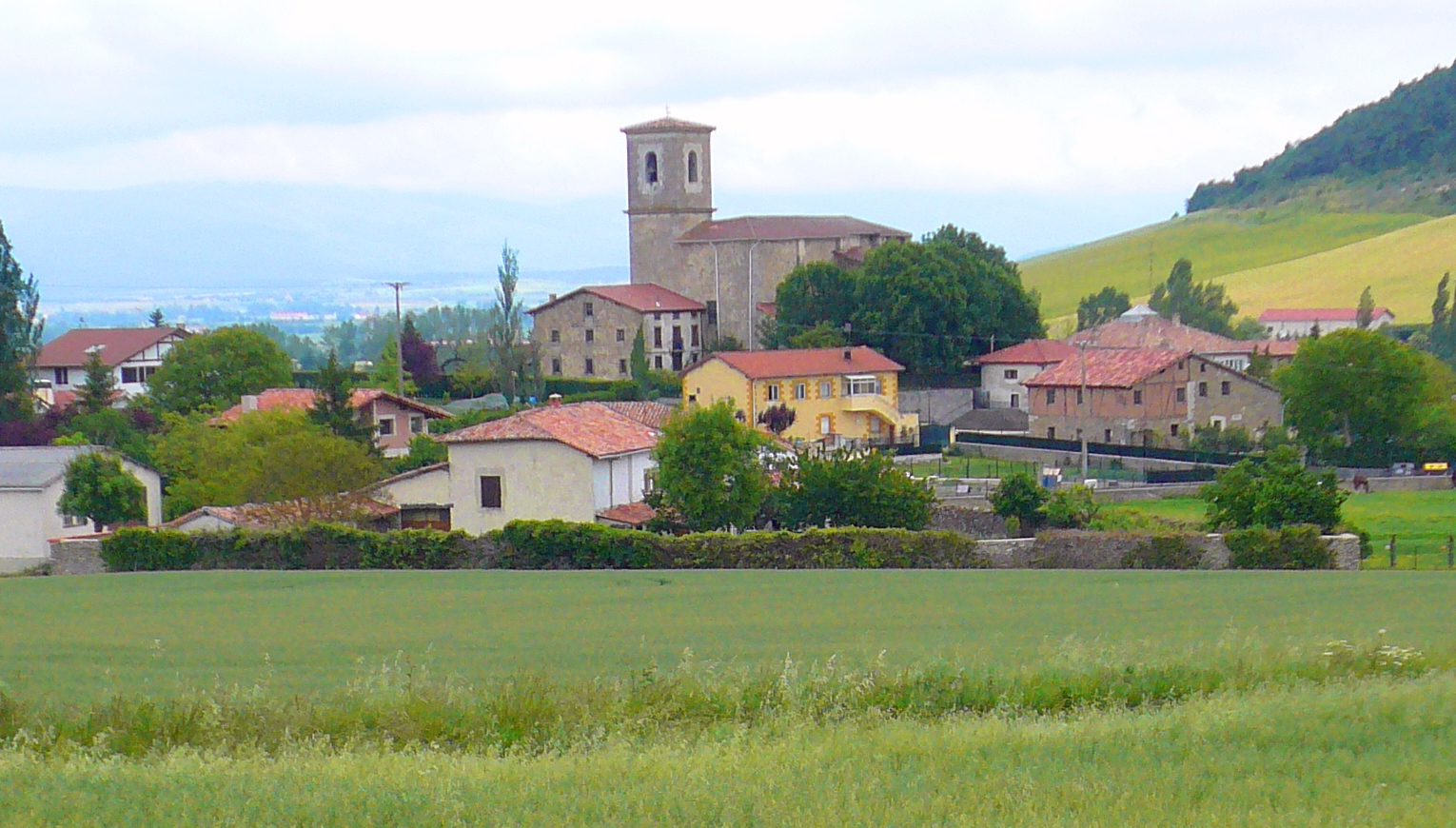
- View of Mendiola

- Location within Álava Location within the Basque Country Location within Spain
- Coordinates: 42°49′03″N 2°39′07″W
- Country: Spain
- Autonomous community: Basque Country
- Province: Álava
- Comarca: Vitoria-Gasteiz
- Municipality: Vitoria-Gasteiz

Area
  - Total: 6.35 km^{2} (2.45 sq mi)
- Elevation: 574 m (1,883 ft)

Population (2023)
  - Total: 252
  - Density: 39.7/km^{2} (103/sq mi)
- Postal code: 01194

Mendiola is a village and concejo in the municipality of Vitoria-Gasteiz, in Álava province, Basque Country, Spain.
