= Ehari/Ali =

Village in Álava, Spain

- Concejo
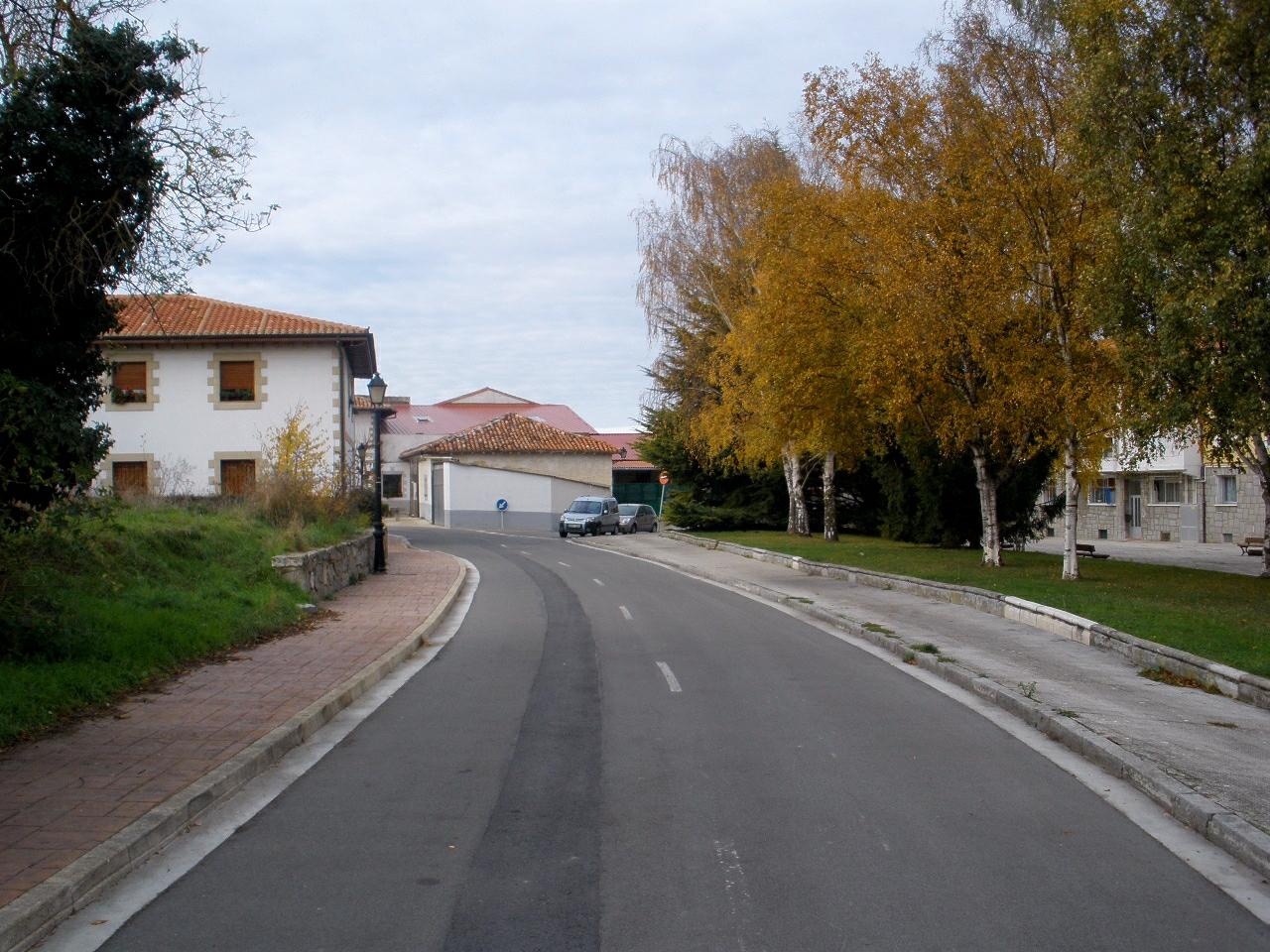

- Coat of arms

- Location within Álava Location within the Basque Country Location within Spain
- Coordinates: 42°51′20″N 2°42′45″W
- Country: Spain
- Autonomous community: Basque Country
- Province: Álava
- Comarca: Vitoria-Gasteiz
- Municipality: Vitoria-Gasteiz
- Elevation: 519 m (1,703 ft)

Population (2021)
  - Total: 132
- Postal code: 01010

Ehari (Basque pronunciation: [eaɾi]) or Ali Spanish pronunciation: [ˈali]) is a village and concejo located in the municipality of Vitoria-Gasteiz, in the Álava province, Basque Country, Spain. The village has been absorbed by the city, and is part of the Ali-Gobeo neighborhood.
