= Estarrona =

Hamlet in Álava, Spain

- Concejo
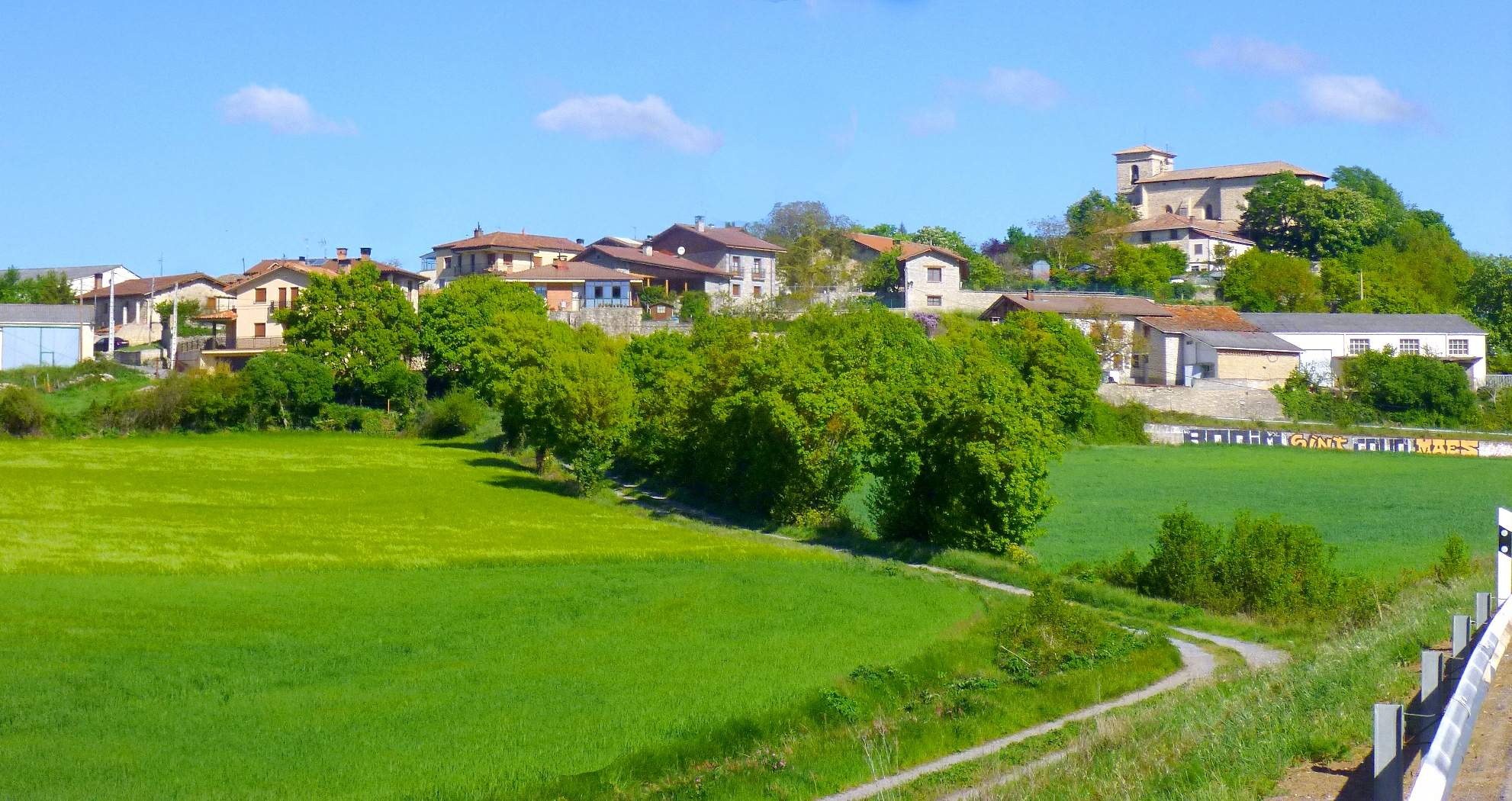
- View of Estarrona

- Location within Álava Location within the Basque Country Location within Spain
- Coordinates: 42.87°N 2.75°W
- Country: Spain
- Autonomous community: Basque Country
- Province: Álava
- Comarca: Vitoria-Gasteiz
- Municipality: Vitoria-Gasteiz

Area
  - Total: 3.28 km^{2} (1.27 sq mi)
- Elevation: 539 m (1,768 ft)

Population (2021)
  - Total: 57
  - Density: 17/km^{2} (45/sq mi)
- Postal code: 01191

Estarrona (Spanish pronunciation: [estaˈrona], Basque: Eztarroa [es̻taroa]) is a hamlet and concejo located in the municipality of Vitoria-Gasteiz, in Álava province, Basque Country, Spain. As of 2021, it had a population of 57.
