= Genevilla =

Municipality of Spain

Coordinates: 42°38′41″N 2°23′30″W

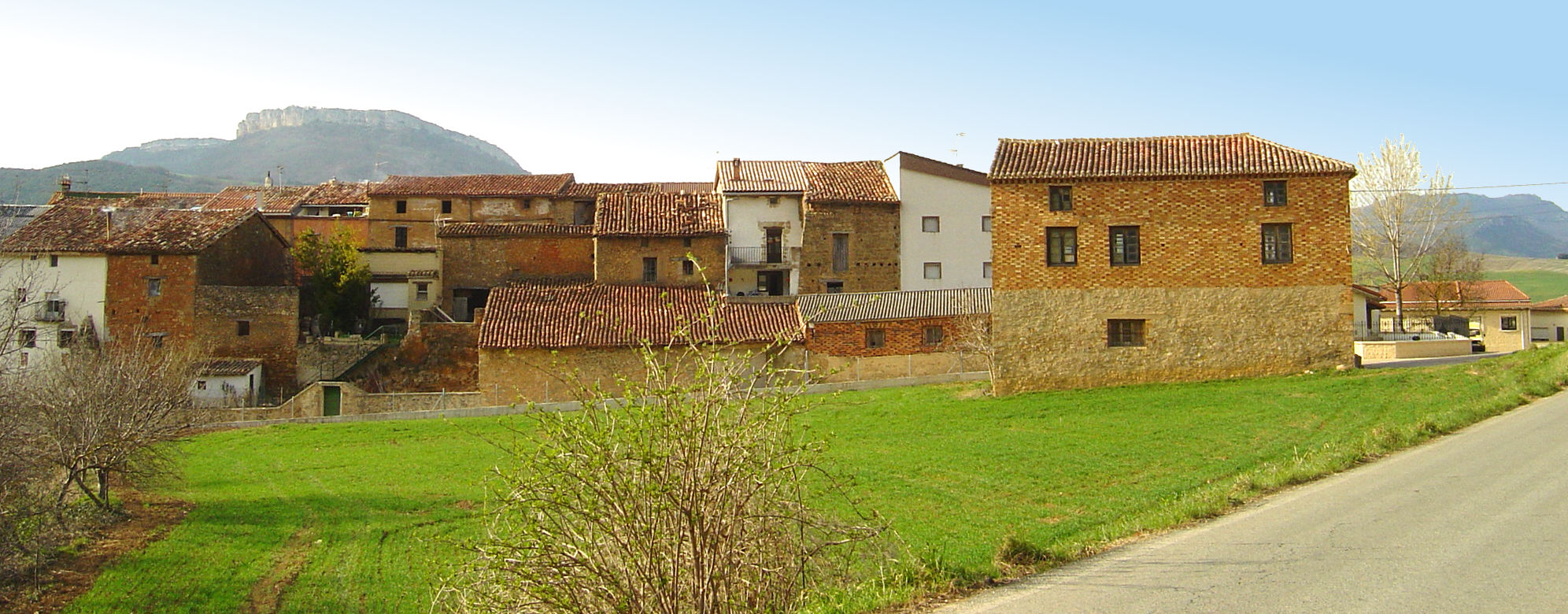

Genevilla is a town and municipality located in the province and autonomous community of Navarre, in northern Spain.
