= Ancín – Antzin =

Ancín Antzin
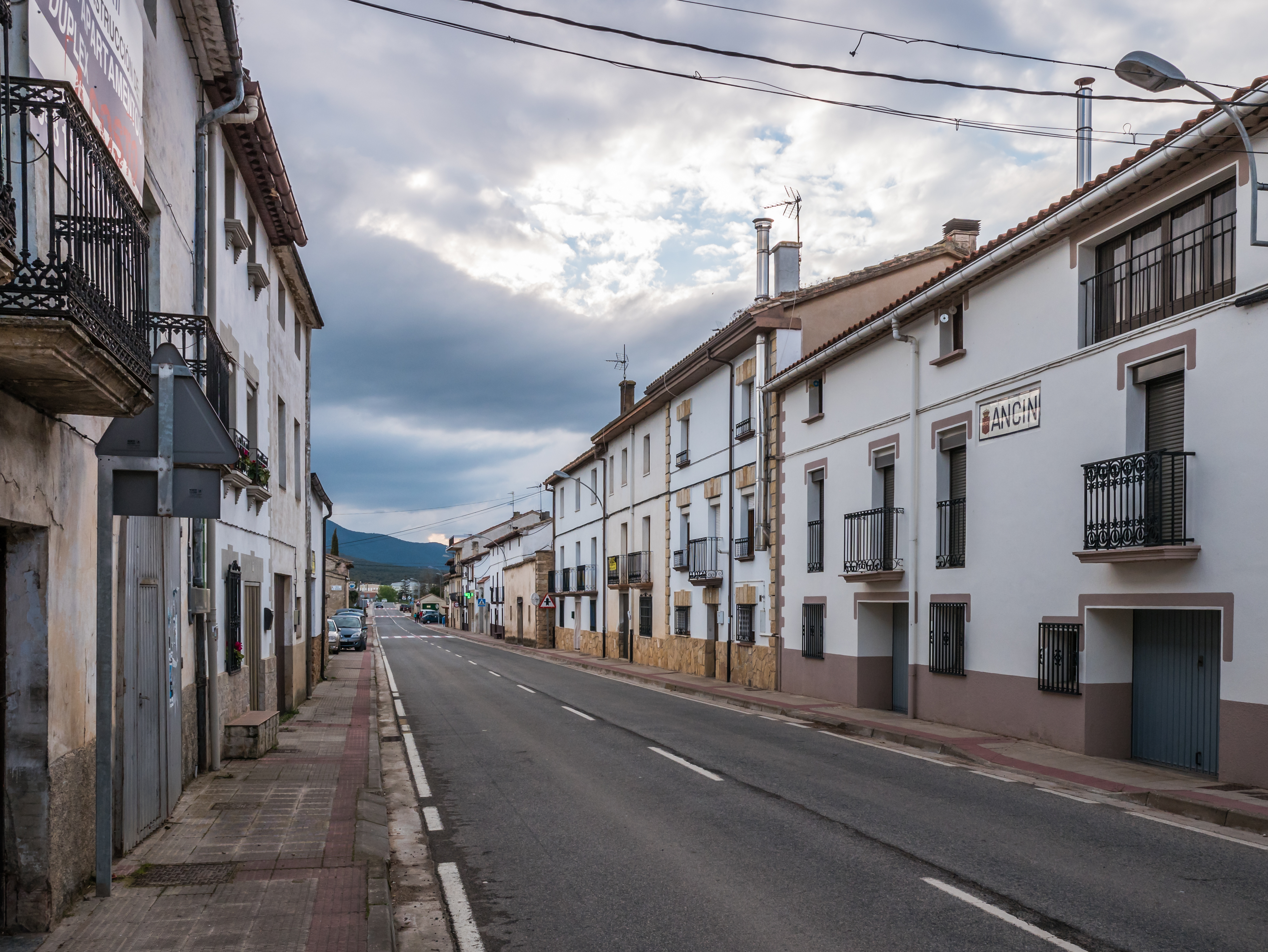
- Road from Vitoria to Estella (NA-132-A) in Ancín

- Coat of arms

- Location of Ancín – Antzin within Navarre
- Coordinates: 42°40′N 2°11′W
- Country: Spain
- Autonomous community: Navarre

Government
  - Mayor: Isaac Corres López

Area
  - Total: 9.48 km^{2} (3.66 sq mi)
- Elevation: 488 m (1,601 ft)

Population (2025-01-01)
  - Total: 363
  - Density: 38.3/km^{2} (99.2/sq mi)
- Time zone: UTC+1 (CET)
  - Summer (DST): UTC+2 (CEST)
- Website: www.ancin-antzin.org

Ancín is a town and municipality located in the province and autonomous community of Navarre, northern Spain.
