= Corres =

Corres is a surname. Notable people with the surname include:

- Anne Fernández de Corres (born 1998), Spanish rugby union and rugby union player
- Celia Corres (born 1964), Spanish field hockey player
- Yulema Corres (born 1992), Spanish football forward

== See also ==
- Korres (disambiguation)
