= Campezo/Kanpezu =

Campezo / Kanpezu
- Municipality
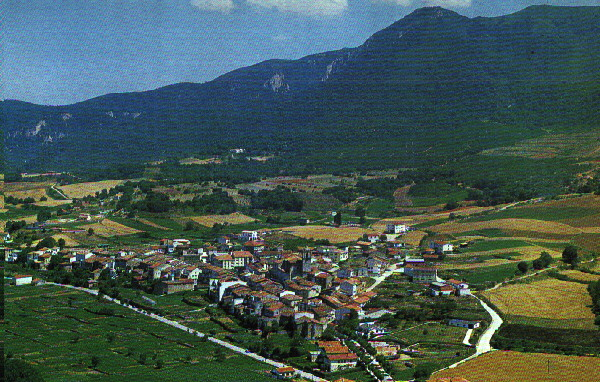
- View of Santa Cruz de Campezo/Santikurutze Kanpezu

- Coat of arms

- Location of Campezo/Kanpezu within the Basque Country Location of Campezo/Kanpezu within Spain
- Coordinates: 42°41′12″N 2°22′12″W
- Country: Spain
- Autonomous Community: Basque Country
- Province: Álava
- Eskualdea / Comarca: Campezo-Montaña Alavesa

Government
  - Mayor: Aitor Aginaga Legorburu (PNB)

Area
  - Total: 85.02 km^{2} (32.83 sq mi)
- Elevation: 575 m (1,886 ft)

Population (2010)
  - Total: 1,126
  - Density: 13.24/km^{2} (34.30/sq mi)
- Time zone: UTC+1 (CET)
  - Summer (DST): UTC+2 (CEST)
- Postal code: 01110
- Official language(s): Basque, Spanish
- Website: Official website

Campezo in Spanish or Kanpezu in Basque is a municipality located in the province of Álava, in the Basque Country, northern Spain.

The municipality lies on the western side of the Codés mountain range.

== Villages ==
- Antoñana
- Bujanda
- Orbiso
- Oteo
- Santa Cruz de Campezo / Santikurutze Kanpezu, capital of the Cuadrilla de Campezo-Montaña Alavesa comarca and main town of the municipality
