= Korres =

Greek beauty products public

Korres S.A.
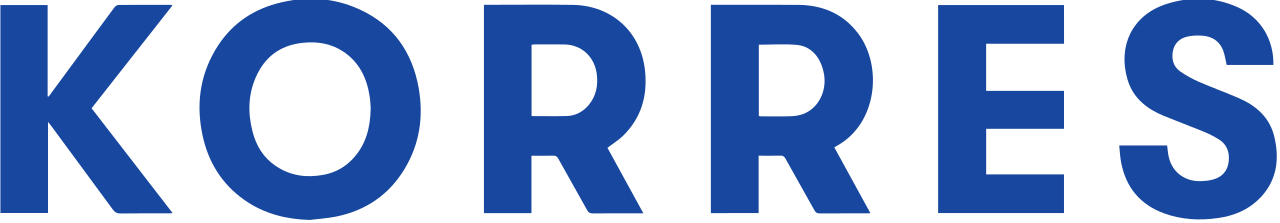
- Company type: S.A.
- Industry: Cosmetics
- Founded: 1996
- Founder: Georgios Korres
- Headquarters: Athens, Greece
- Website: korres.com

Κorres is a Greek company founded in 1996 in Athens by pharmacist Georgios Korres from the island of Naxos.

== Overview ==
The company produces beauty products for women and men, based on natural ingredients (and partly on homeopathy) and it was a pioneer in Greece in this sector.

== Stores ==
As of June 2015, the company had stores in ten European countries and in Singapore and South Korea.

== See also ==
- Dermalogica
- Hondos Center
