= Hondos Center =

Hondos Center is a beauty retail market that has been operational in Greece since 1967. With 79 stores around Greece employing over 6,000 people, it is enlisted amongst the prime and largest known cosmetics distribution networks in Europe.
