= Korres, Álava =

Hamlet in Álava, Spain

Korres
- Concejo
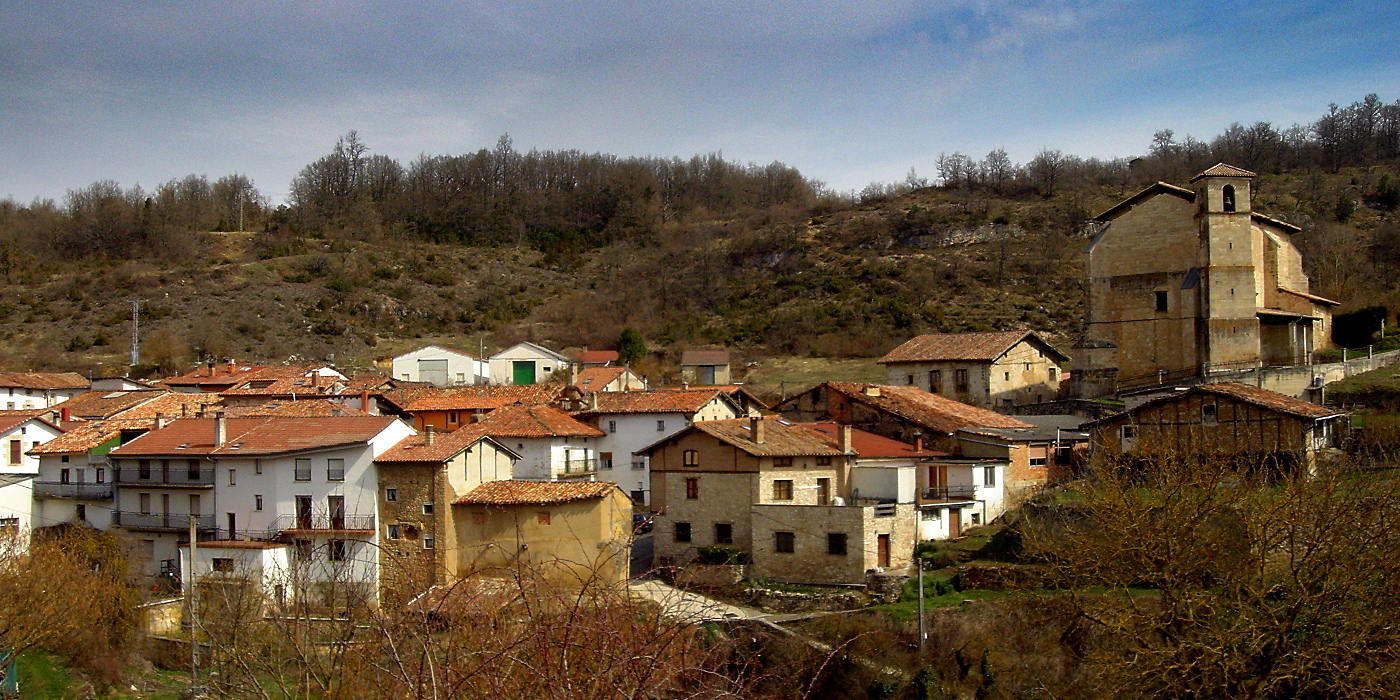
- View of Korres

- Location within Álava Location within the Basque Country Location within Spain
- Coordinates: 42.6981°N 2.4333°W
- Country: Spain
- Autonomous community: Basque Country
- Province: Álava
- Comarca: Montaña Alavesa
- Municipality: Arraia-Maeztu

Area
  - Total: 13.28 km^{2} (5.13 sq mi)
- Elevation: 706 m (2,316 ft)

Population (2021)
  - Total: 30
  - Density: 2.3/km^{2} (5.9/sq mi)
- Postal code: 01129

Korres (Basque pronunciation: [kores̺], Spanish: Corres [ˈkores]) is a hamlet and concejo located in the municipality of Arraia-Maeztu, in Álava province, Basque Country, Spain. The hamlet is located within the Izki Natural Park.
