= Oteo =

Hamlet in Álava, Spain

- Concejo
- Location within Álava Location within the Basque Country Location within Spain
- Coordinates: 42°43′00″N 2°22′01″W
- Country: Spain
- Autonomous community: Basque Country
- Province: Álava
- Comarca: Montaña Alavesa
- Municipality: Campezo/Kanpezu

Area
  - Total: 12.43 km^{2} (4.80 sq mi)
- Elevation: 687 m (2,254 ft)

Population (2023)
  - Total: 27
  - Density: 2.2/km^{2} (5.6/sq mi)
- Postal code: 01117

Oteo is a hamlet and concejo in the municipality of Campezo/Kanpezu, Álava province, Basque Country, Spain.
