= Ega (river) =

River in Spain

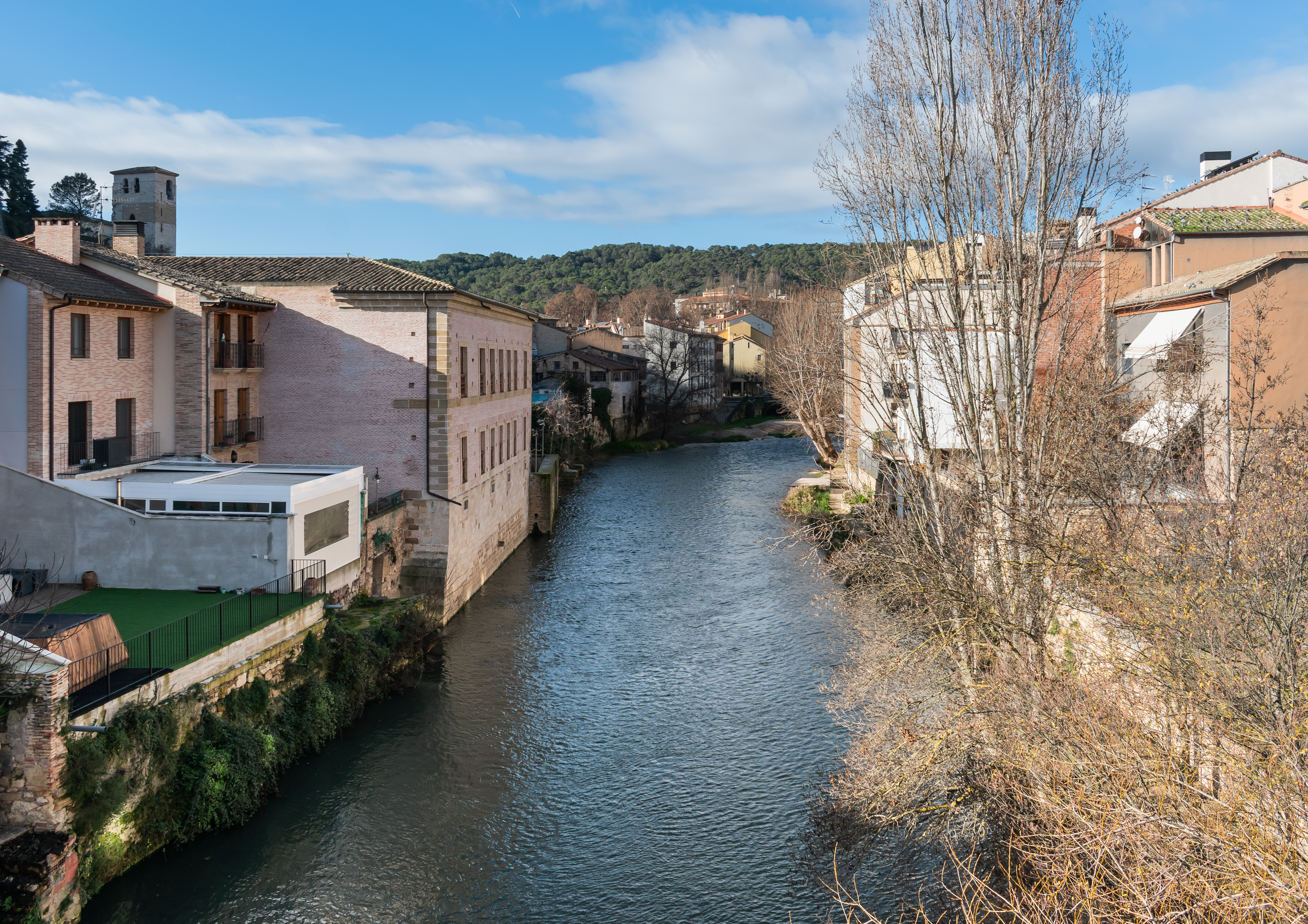
- The Ega river in Estella-Lizarra

Location
- Country: Spain

Physical characteristics
- Source
  - location: Álava
  - coordinates: 42°37′10″N 2°36′46″W
- Mouth
  - location: Ebro
  - coordinates: 42°19′42″N 1°55′10″W

Basin features
- Progression: Ebro→ Balearic Sea

The Ega is a river in the north of Spain. It is a tributary of the Ebro, which in turn empties into the Balearic Sea. The Ega flows through Navarre, but it originates in Álava, near Lagrán, and flows through the town of Estella-Lizarra.

== See also ==
- List of rivers of Spain
