= Antoñana =

Village in Álava, Spain

- Concejo
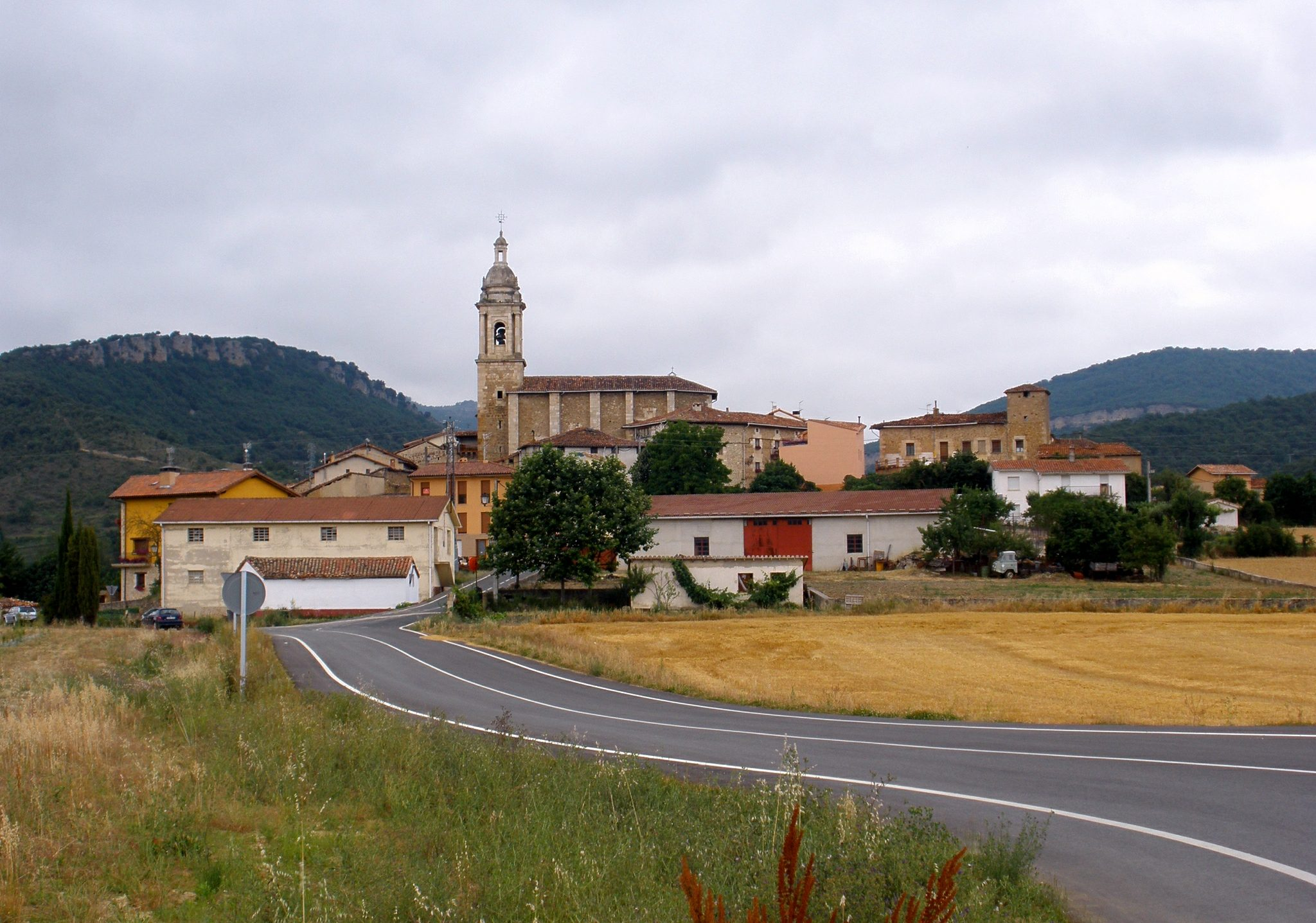
- View of Antoñana

- Location within Álava Location within the Basque Country Location within Spain
- Coordinates: 42°41′35″N 2°23′42″W
- Country: Spain
- Autonomous community: Basque Country
- Province: Álava
- Comarca: Montaña Alavesa
- Municipality: Campezo/Kanpezu

Area
  - Total: 17.25 km^{2} (6.66 sq mi)
- Elevation: 607 m (1,991 ft)

Population (2023)
  - Total: 142
  - Density: 8.23/km^{2} (21.3/sq mi)
- Postal code: 01128

Antoñana is a village and concejo in the municipality of Campezo/Kanpezu, in Álava province, Basque Country, Spain. Its walls have been declared a Bien de Interés Cultural.
