= Cuadrilla de Vitoria =

Cuadrilla de Vitoria/Gasteizko kuadrilla
- Comarca
- Cuadrilla de Vitoria-Gasteiz (Spanish); Vitoria-Gasteizko kuadrilla (Basque)
- Flag Coat of arms

- Location within Álava
- Country: Spain
- Autonomous community: Basque Country
- Province: Álava
- Seat: Vitoria-Gasteiz

Government
  - Mayor of Vitoria-Gasteiz: Maider Etxebarria

Area
  - Total: 275.8 km^{2} (106.5 sq mi)

Population (2022)
  - Total: 254,445
  - Density: 922.6/km^{2} (2,389/sq mi)
- Time zone: UTC+1 (CET)
  - Summer (DST): UTC+2 (CEST)

The Cuadrilla de Vitoria (Basque: Gasteizko kuadrilla) is a comarca of the province of Álava, Basque Country, Spain. It is conterminous with the municipality of Vitoria-Gasteiz. Unlike the other cuadrillas, it does not have its own institutions, being mostly symbolic. The mayor of Vitoria-Gasteiz holds the ex officio position of president of the council of the cuadrilla. The Cuadrilla de Añana was part of the Cuadrilla de Vitoria until 1840.
