= Asteguieta =

Village and concejo in Basque Country, Spain

- Concejo
- Coat of arms

- Location within Álava Location within the Basque Country Location within Spain
- Coordinates: 42°51′40″N 2°43′50″W
- Country: Spain
- Autonomous community: Basque Country
- Province: Álava
- Comarca: Vitoria-Gasteiz
- Municipality: Vitoria-Gasteiz
- Elevation: 504 m (1,654 ft)

Population (2022)
  - Total: 304
- Postal code: 01191

Asteguieta (Basque: Aztegieta) is a village and concejo in the municipality of Vitoria-Gasteiz, in Álava province, Basque Country, Spain. It is located next to the Zadorra river.
