= Hueto Arriba =

Hamlet in Álava, Spain

Hueto Arriba/Otogoien
- Concejo
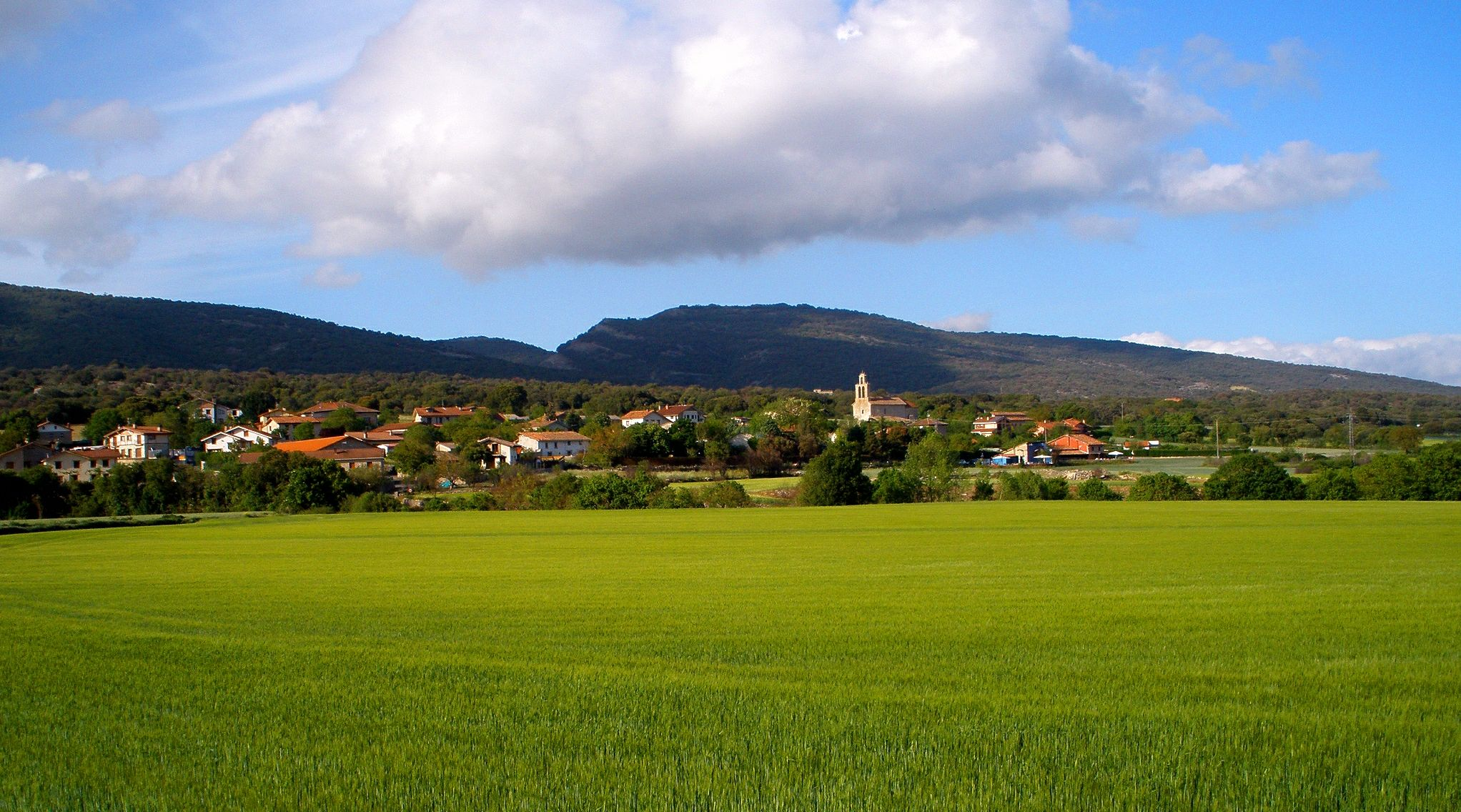

- Coat of arms

- Location within Álava Location within the Basque Country Location within Spain
- Coordinates: 42.8911°N 2.8017°W
- Country: Spain
- Autonomous community: Basque Country
- Province: Álava
- Comarca: Vitoria-Gasteiz
- Municipality: Vitoria-Gasteiz

Area
  - Total: 10.77 km^{2} (4.16 sq mi)
- Elevation: 551 m (1,808 ft)

Population (2022)
  - Total: 59
  - Density: 5.5/km^{2} (14/sq mi)
- Postal code: 01191

Hueto Arriba (Spanish pronunciation: [ˈweto aˈriβa]) or Otogoien (Basque pronunciation: [otoɣoi.en]) is a hamlet and concejo located in the municipality of Vitoria-Gasteiz, in Álava province, Basque Country, Spain.
