= Mendiguren =

Hamlet in Álava, Spain

- Concejo
- Location within Álava Location within the Basque Country Location within Spain
- Coordinates: 42°54′00″N 2°42′16″W
- Country: Spain
- Autonomous community: Basque Country
- Province: Álava
- Comarca: Vitoria-Gasteiz
- Municipality: Vitoria-Gasteiz

Area
  - Total: 2.44 km^{2} (0.94 sq mi)
- Elevation: 515 m (1,690 ft)

Population (2023)
  - Total: 26
  - Density: 11/km^{2} (28/sq mi)
- Postal code: 01196

Mendiguren is a hamlet and concejo in the municipality of Vitoria-Gasteiz, in Álava province, Basque Country, Spain.
