= Yurre =

Hamlet in Álava

Yurre/Ihurre
- Concejo
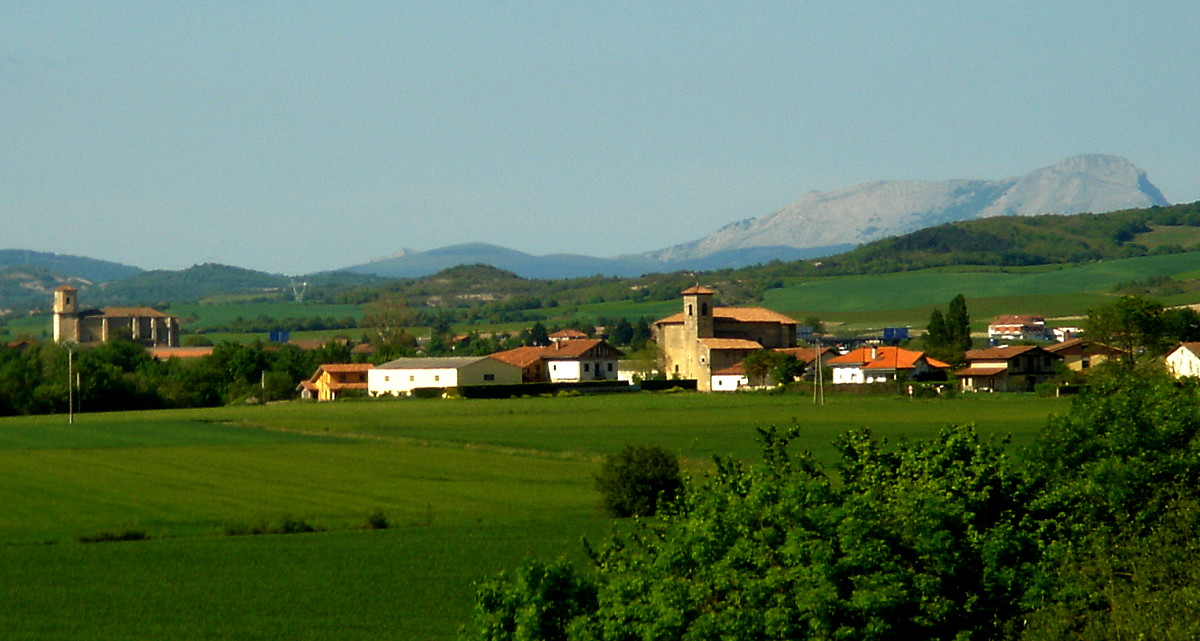
- View of Yurre

- Coat of arms

- Location within Álava Location within the Basque Country Location within Spain
- Coordinates: 42°52′36″N 2°42′05″W
- Country: Spain
- Autonomous community: Basque Country
- Province: Álava
- Comarca: Vitoria-Gasteiz
- Municipality: Vitoria-Gasteiz
- Elevation: 506 m (1,660 ft)

Population (2022)
  - Total: 52
- Postal code: 01196

Yurre (Spanish pronunciation: [ˈɟʝure]) or Ihurre (Basque pronunciation: [i.ure]) is a hamlet and concejo located in the municipality of Vitoria-Gasteiz, in Álava province, Basque Country, Spain.
