= Ilarratza =

Hamlet in Álava

- Concejo
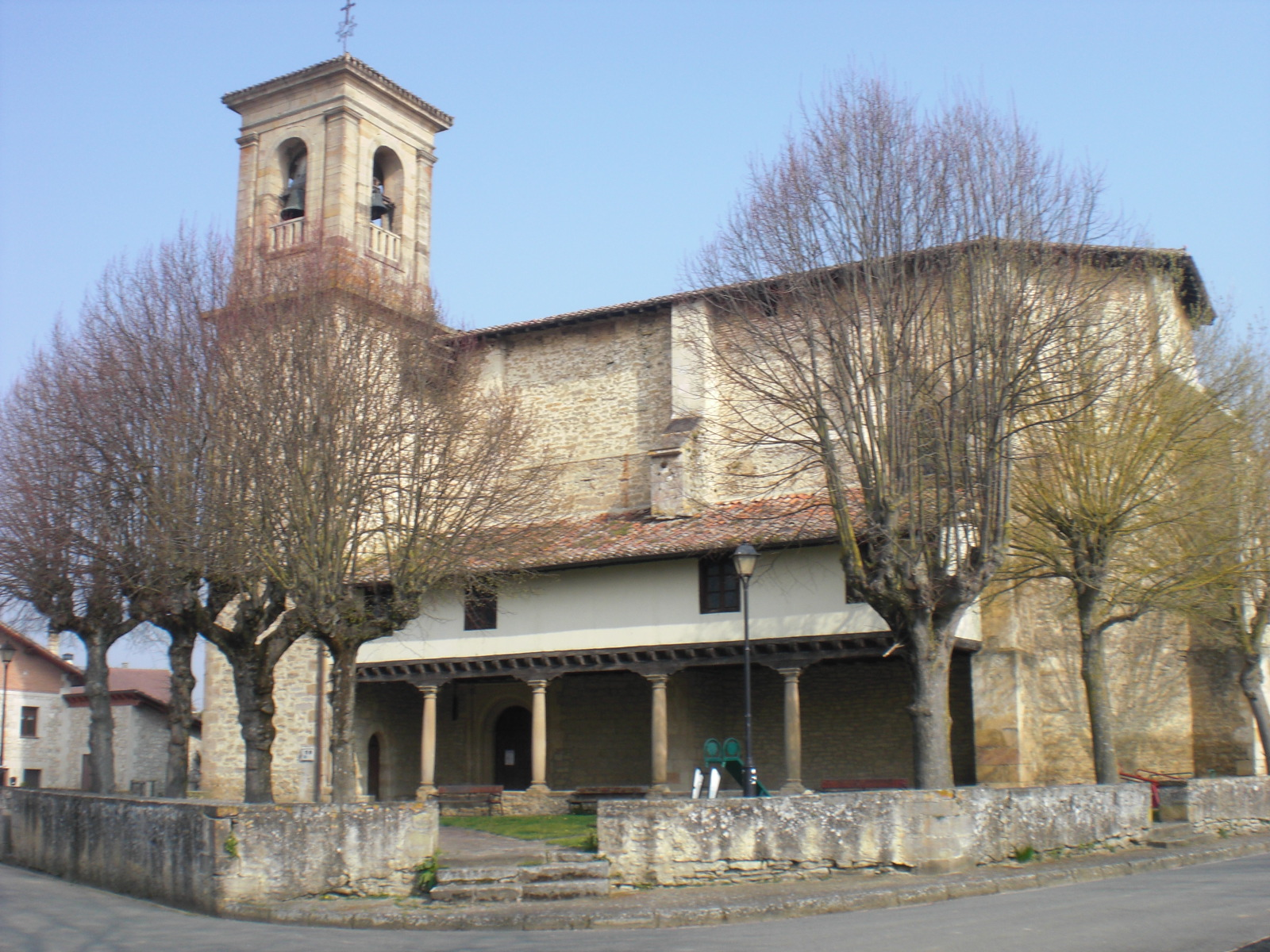
- Church of Ilarratza

- Location within Álava Location within the Basque Country Location within Spain
- Coordinates: 42°51′36″N 2°35′53″W
- Country: Spain
- Autonomous community: Basque Country
- Province: Álava
- Comarca: Vitoria-Gasteiz
- Municipality: Vitoria-Gasteiz

Area
  - Total: 3.26 km^{2} (1.26 sq mi)
- Elevation: 521 m (1,709 ft)

Population (2022)
  - Total: 94
  - Density: 29/km^{2} (75/sq mi)
- Postal code: 01192

Ilarratza (Spanish: Ilárraza) is a hamlet and concejo located in the municipality of Vitoria-Gasteiz, in Álava province, Basque Country, Spain.
