= Krispiña =

Hamlet in Álava, Spain

Krispiña/Crispijana
- Concejo
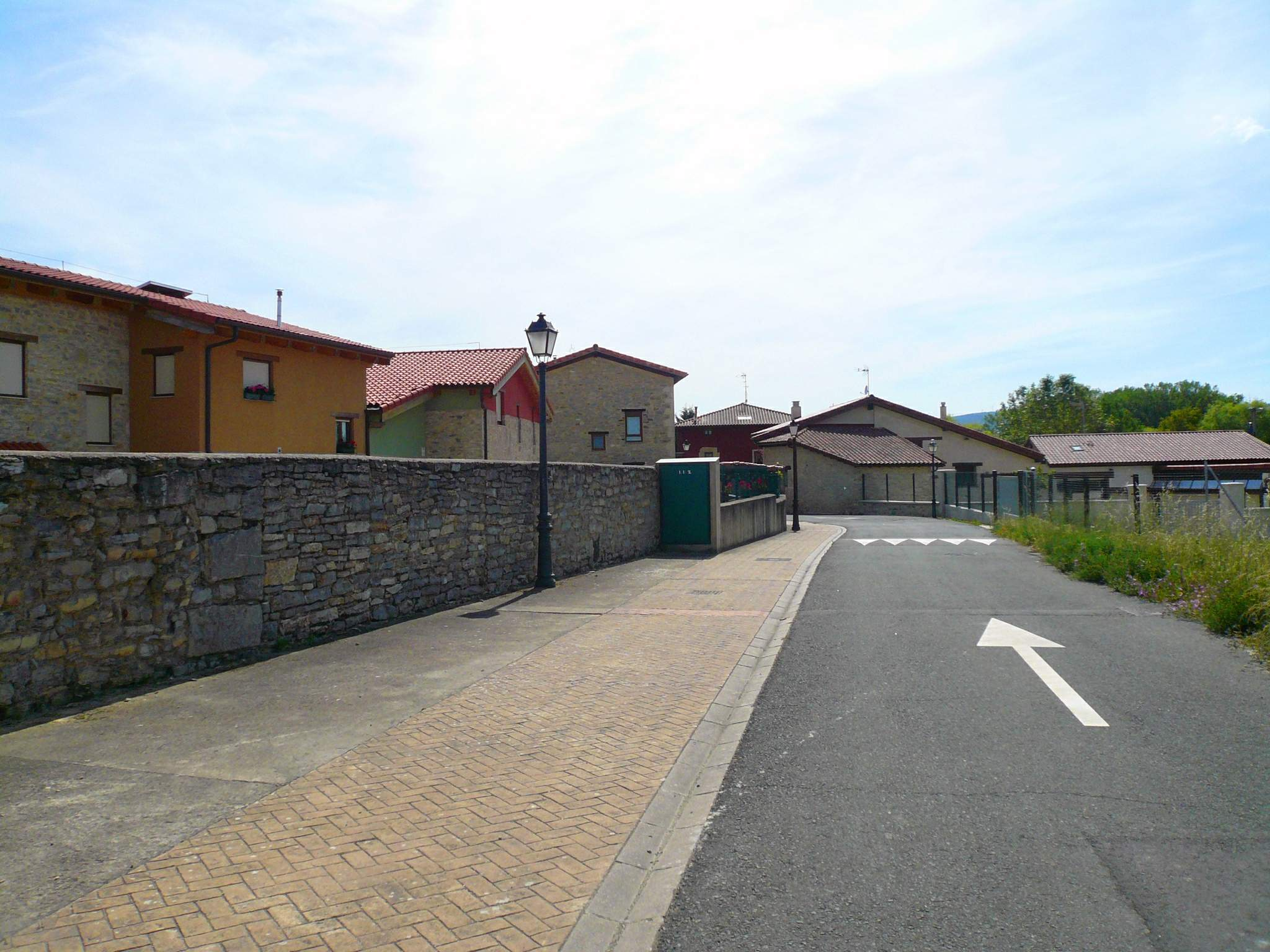

- Coat of arms

- Location within Álava Location within the Basque Country Location within Spain
- Coordinates: 42.8531°N 2.7306°W
- Country: Spain
- Autonomous community: Basque Country
- Province: Álava
- Comarca: Vitoria-Gasteiz
- Municipality: Vitoria-Gasteiz
- Elevation: 506 m (1,660 ft)

Population (2021)
  - Total: 34
- Postal code: 01195

Krispiña (Basque pronunciation: [kɾisˈpiɲa]) or Crispijana (Spanish pronunciation: [kɾispiˈxana]) is a hamlet and concejo located in the municipality of Vitoria-Gasteiz, in Álava province, Basque Country, Spain.
