= Lubiano =

Hamlet in Álava, Spain

- Concejo
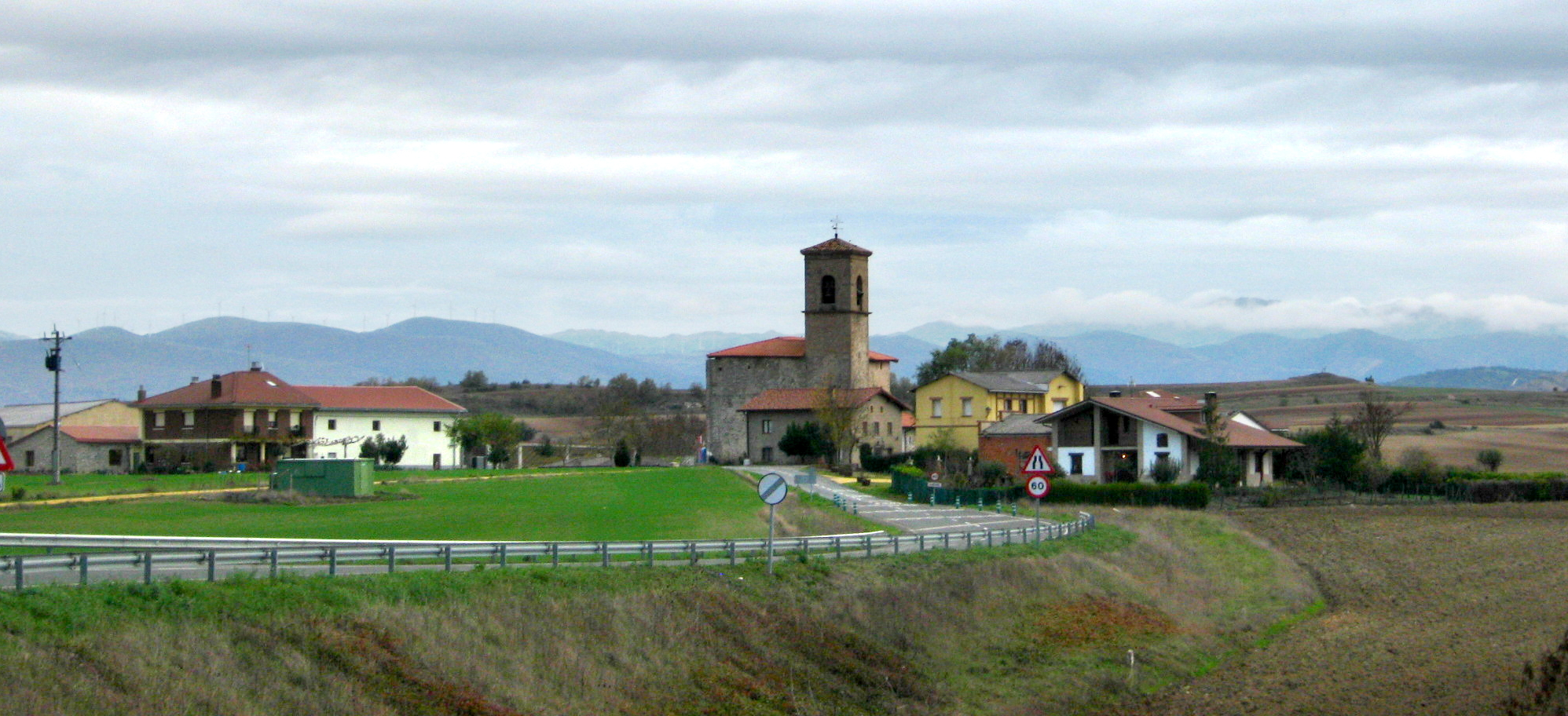
- View of Lubiano

- Coat of arms

- Location within Álava Location within the Basque Country Location within Spain
- Coordinates: 42°52′54″N 2°34′44″W
- Country: Spain
- Autonomous community: Basque Country
- Province: Álava
- Comarca: Vitoria-Gasteiz
- Municipality: Vitoria-Gasteiz

Area
  - Total: 4.56 km^{2} (1.76 sq mi)
- Elevation: 540 m (1,770 ft)

Population (2022)
  - Total: 34
  - Density: 7.5/km^{2} (19/sq mi)
- Postal code: 01192

Lubiano (Basque: Lubinao) is a hamlet and concejo in the municipality of Vitoria-Gasteiz, in Álava province, Basque Country, Spain.

Lubiano was first mentioned and recorded as Luviano in the Reja de San Millán of 1025, and referenced again as Luviano in 1257. It became part of the municipality of Vitoria in 1332.

== Geography ==
It is located in the northeast of the municipality, at the foot of the Iturriaga hill. The environmental make-up was described in 1847 as consisting of large oak groves and swamps. The village is built over clay loam.
