= Oreitia =

Hamlet in Álava, Spain

- Concejo
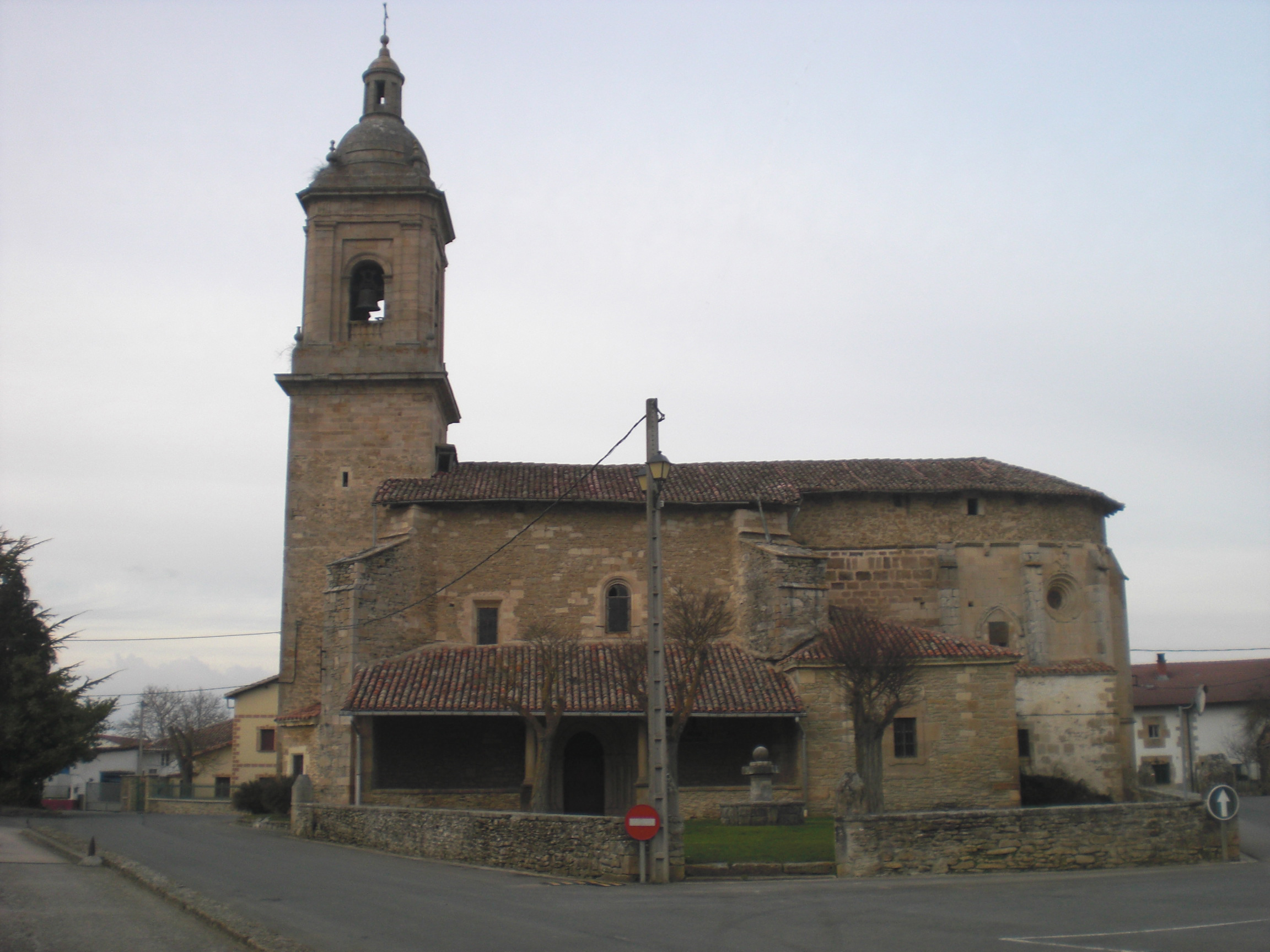
- The church of Oreitia

- Location within Álava Location within the Basque Country Location within Spain
- Coordinates: 42°51′26″N 2°33′31″W
- Country: Spain
- Autonomous community: Basque Country
- Province: Álava
- Comarca: Vitoria-Gasteiz
- Municipality: Vitoria-Gasteiz

Area
  - Total: 3.35 km^{2} (1.29 sq mi)
- Elevation: 534 m (1,752 ft)

Population (2023)
  - Total: 70
  - Density: 21/km^{2} (54/sq mi)
- Postal code: 01192

Oreitia is a hamlet and concejo in the municipality of Vitoria-Gasteiz, in Álava province, Basque Country, Spain.
