= Andollu =

Hamlet in Álava, Spain

- Concejo
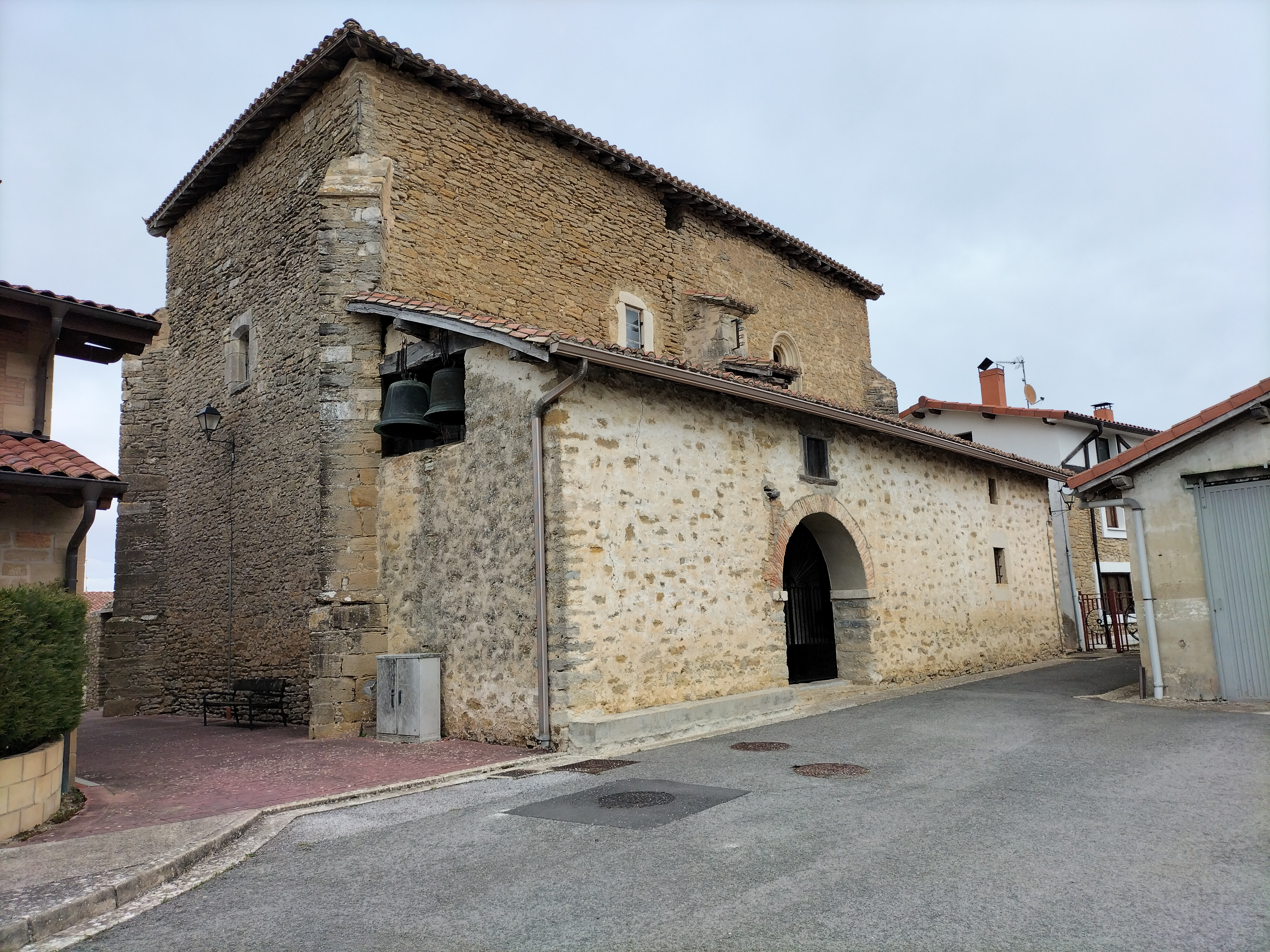

- Location within Álava Location within the Basque Country Location within Spain
- Coordinates: 42°49′56″N 2°34′04″W
- Country: Spain
- Autonomous community: Basque Country
- Province: Álava
- Comarca: Vitoria-Gasteiz
- Municipality: Vitoria-Gasteiz

Area
  - Total: 3.01 km^{2} (1.16 sq mi)
- Elevation: 555 m (1,821 ft)

Population (2022)
  - Total: 41
  - Density: 14/km^{2} (35/sq mi)
- Postal code: 01193

Andollu is a hamlet and concejo in the municipality of Vitoria-Gasteiz, in Álava province, Basque Country, Spain. They have a local church dedicated to Saint Catherine.
