= Ullíbarri-Arrazua =

Hamlet in Álava, Spain

- Concejo
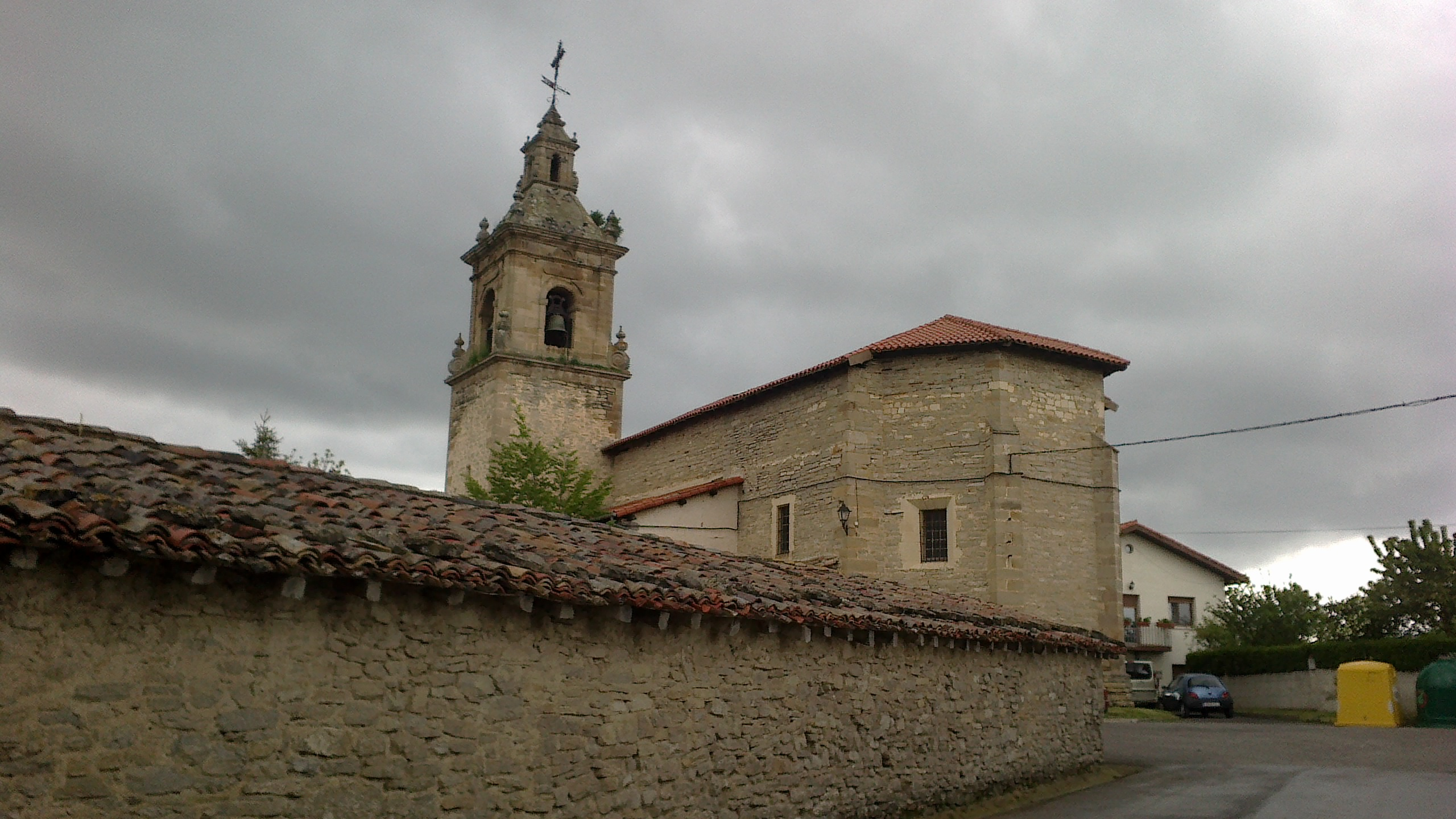
- The church of Ullíbarri-Arrazua

- Coat of arms

- Location within Álava Location within the Basque Country Location within Spain
- Coordinates: 42°53′18″N 2°35′36″W
- Country: Spain
- Autonomous community: Basque Country
- Province: Álava
- Comarca: Vitoria-Gasteiz
- Municipality: Vitoria-Gasteiz

Area
  - Total: 6.10 km^{2} (2.36 sq mi)
- Elevation: 529 m (1,736 ft)

Population (2023)
  - Total: 70
  - Density: 11/km^{2} (30/sq mi)
- Postal code: 01520

Ullíbarri-Arrazua (Basque: Uribarri Arratzua) is a hamlet and concejo in the municipality of Vitoria-Gasteiz, in Álava province, Basque Country, Spain.
