= Matauko =

Hamlet in Álava, Spain

- Concejo
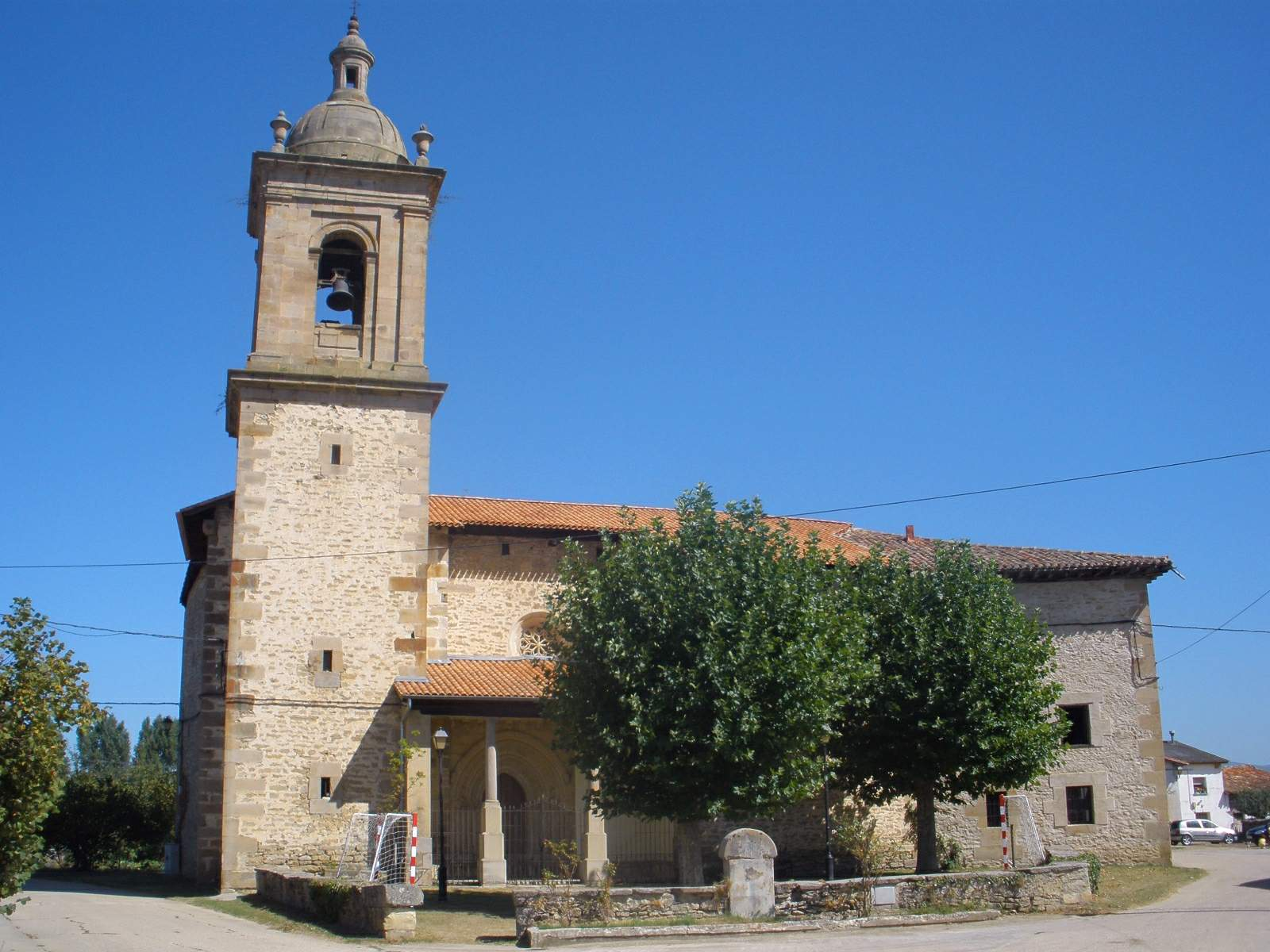
- Church of Matauko

- Location within Álava Location within the Basque Country Location within Spain
- Coordinates: 42°51′41″N 2°34′40″W
- Country: Spain
- Autonomous community: Basque Country
- Province: Álava
- Comarca: Vitoria-Gasteiz
- Municipality: Vitoria-Gasteiz

Area
  - Total: 2.75 km^{2} (1.06 sq mi)
- Elevation: 528 m (1,732 ft)

Population (2022)
  - Total: 49
  - Density: 18/km^{2} (46/sq mi)
- Postal code: 01192

Matauko (Spanish: Matauco, alternatively in Basque: Matauku) is a hamlet and concejo in the municipality of Vitoria-Gasteiz, in Álava province, Basque Country, Spain.
