= Vitoria-Gasteiz =

Vitoria-Gasteiz Vitoria (Spanish) Gasteiz (Basque)
- Municipality
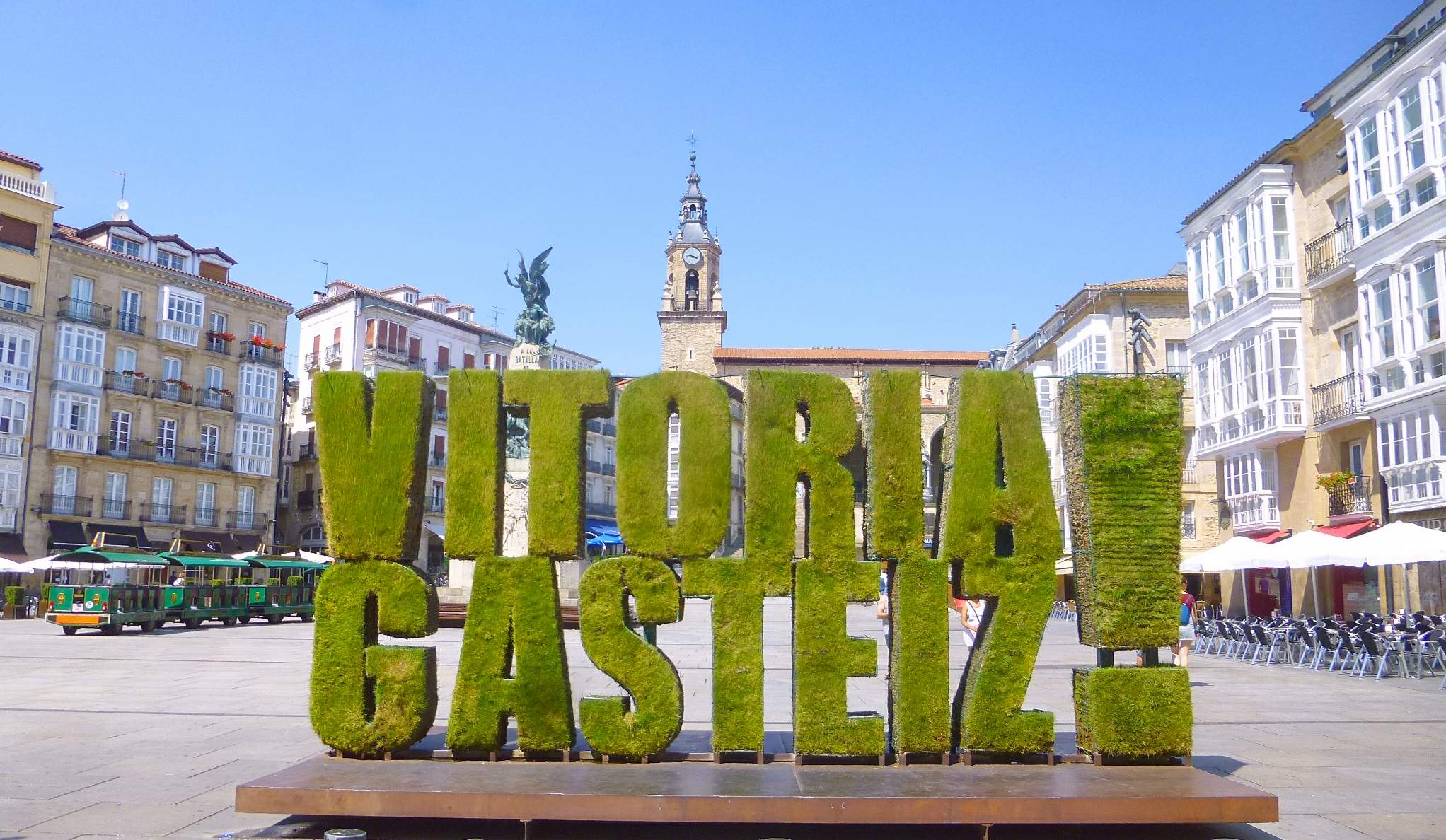
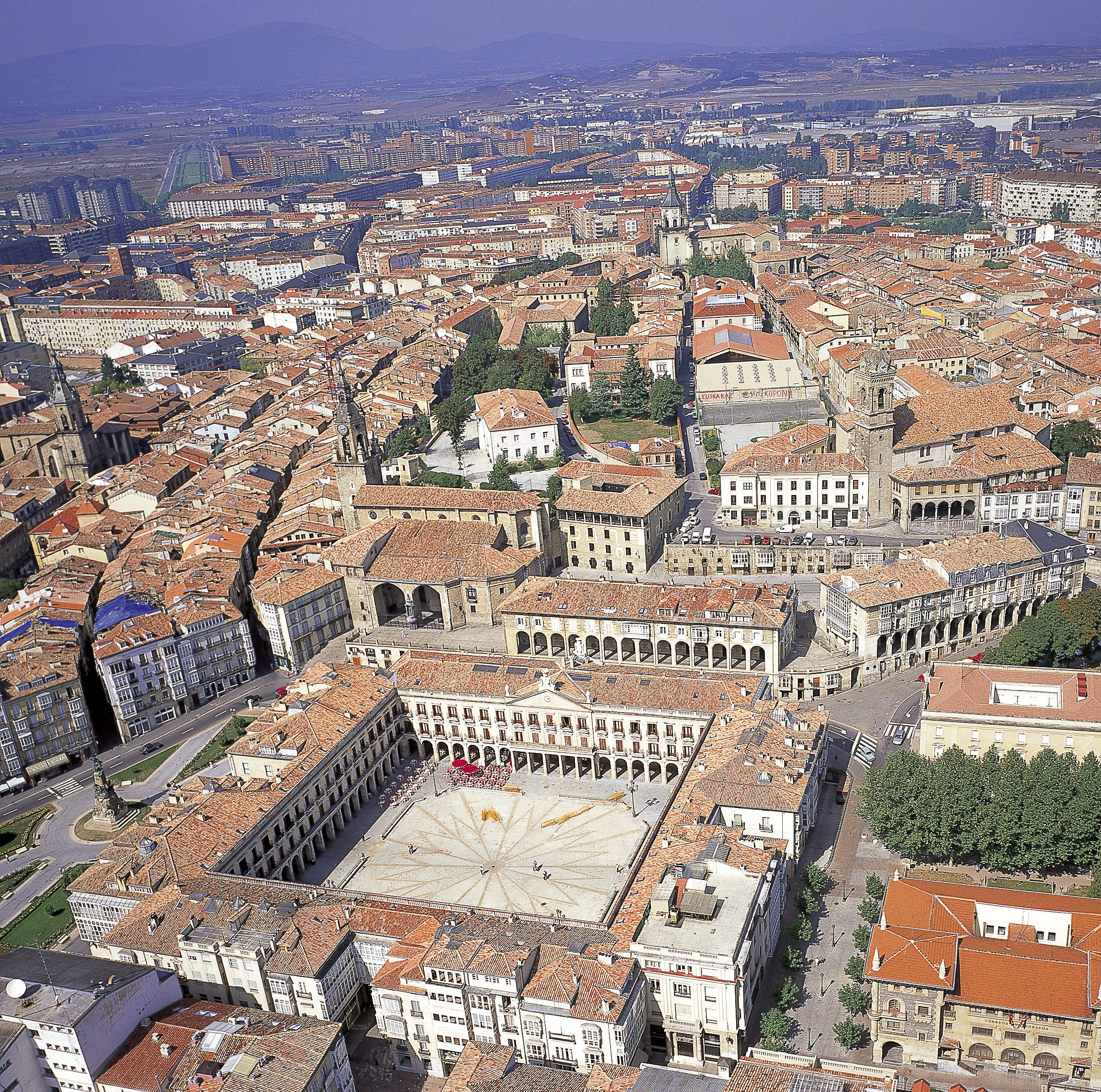
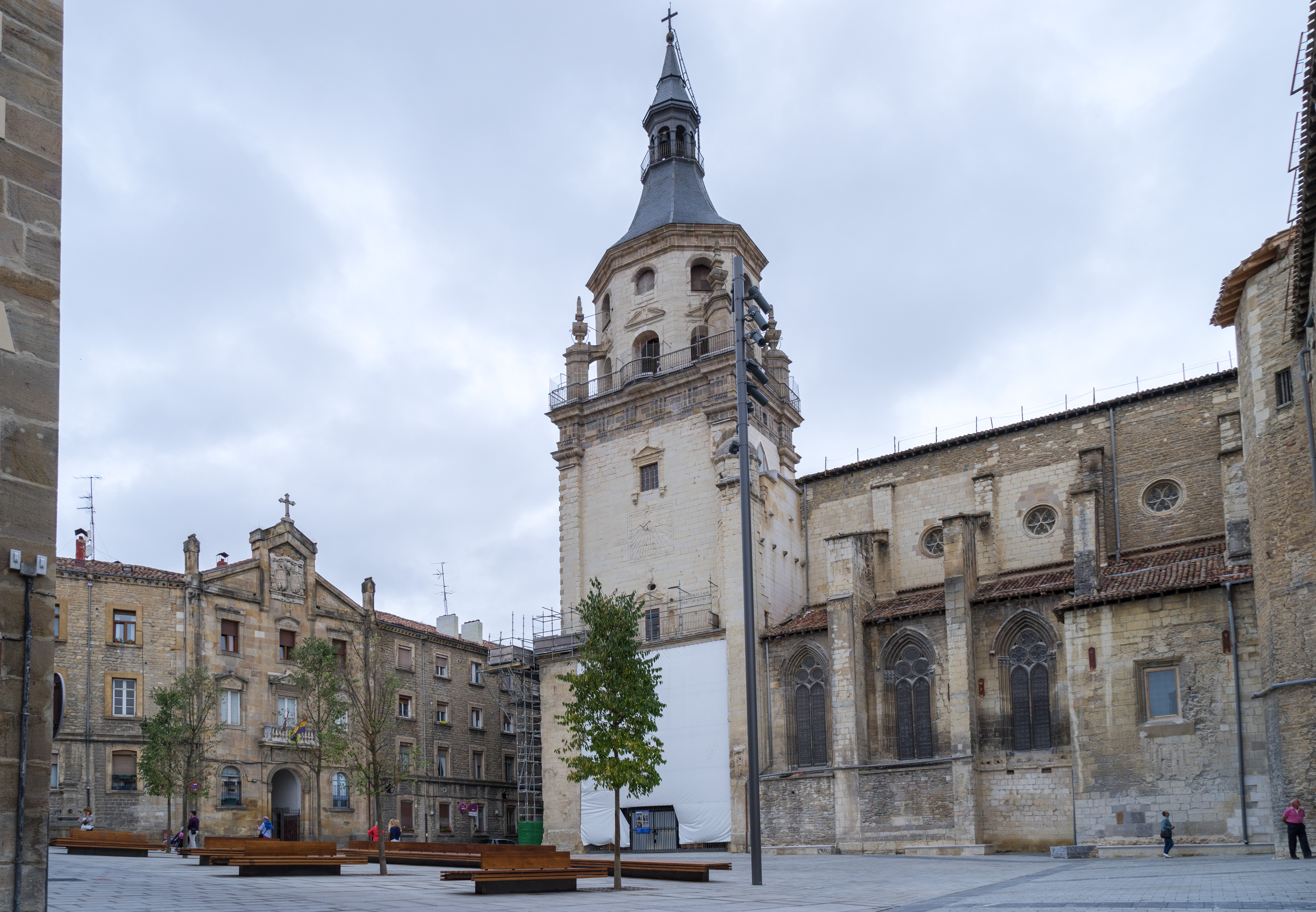
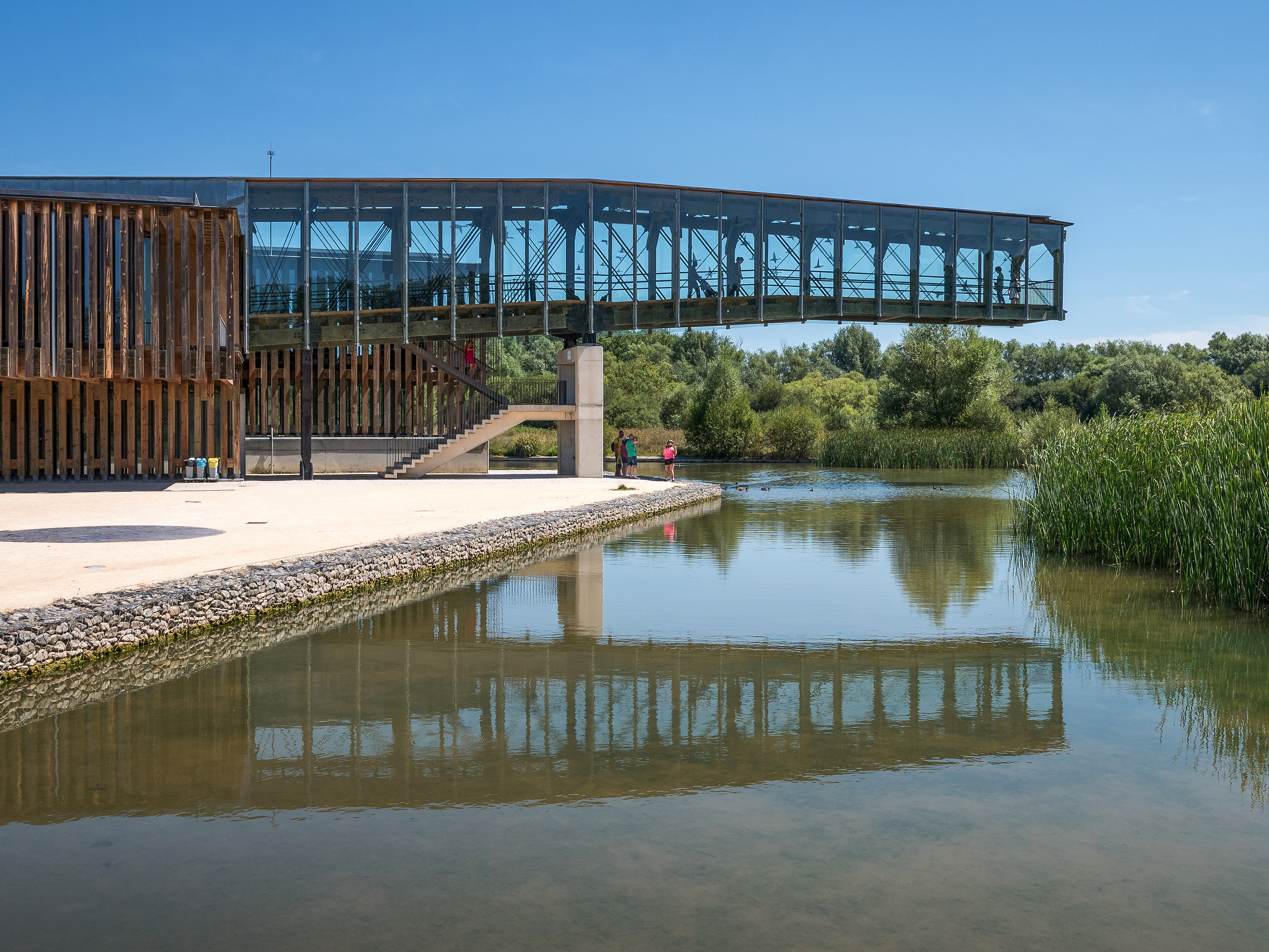
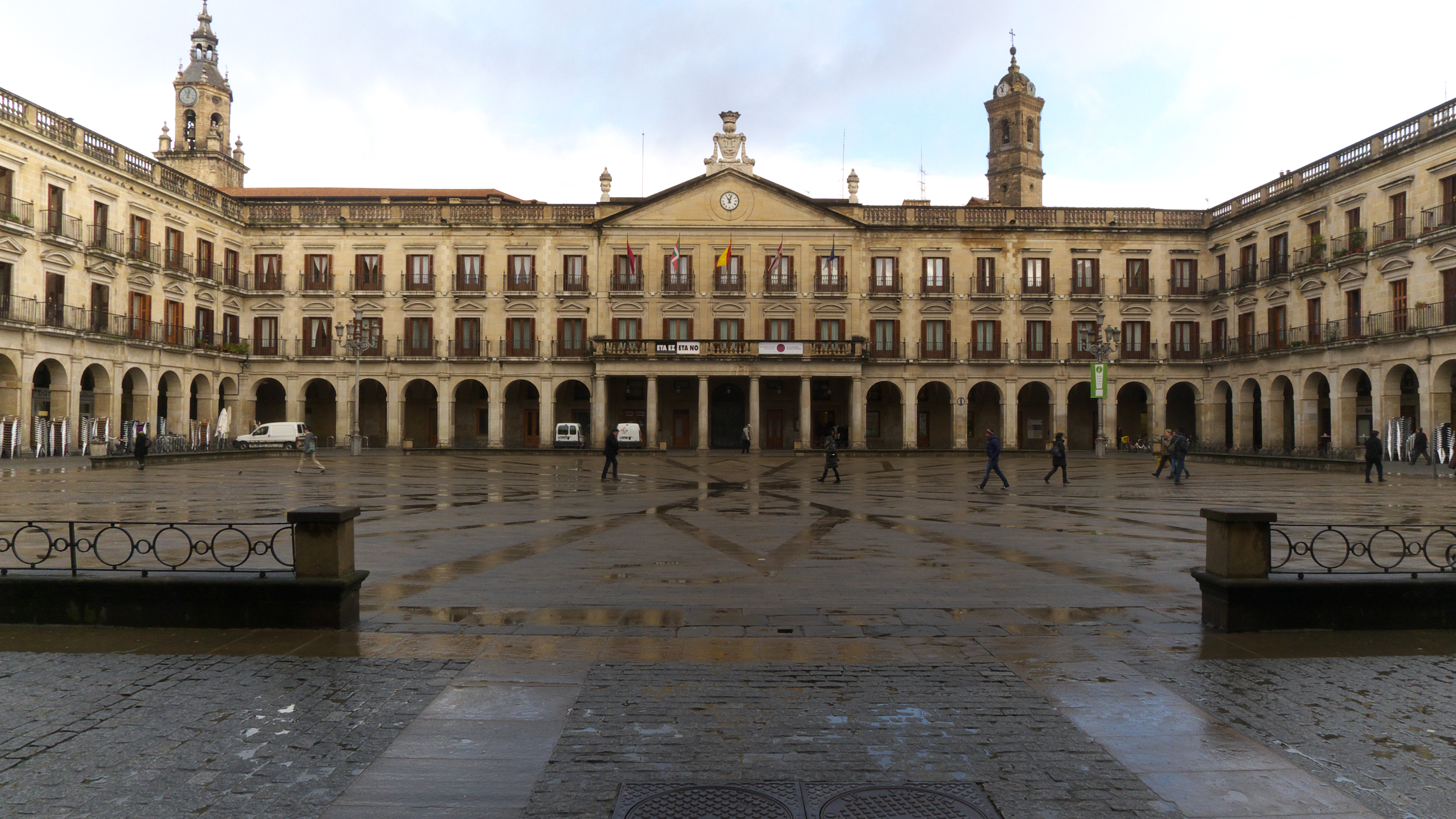
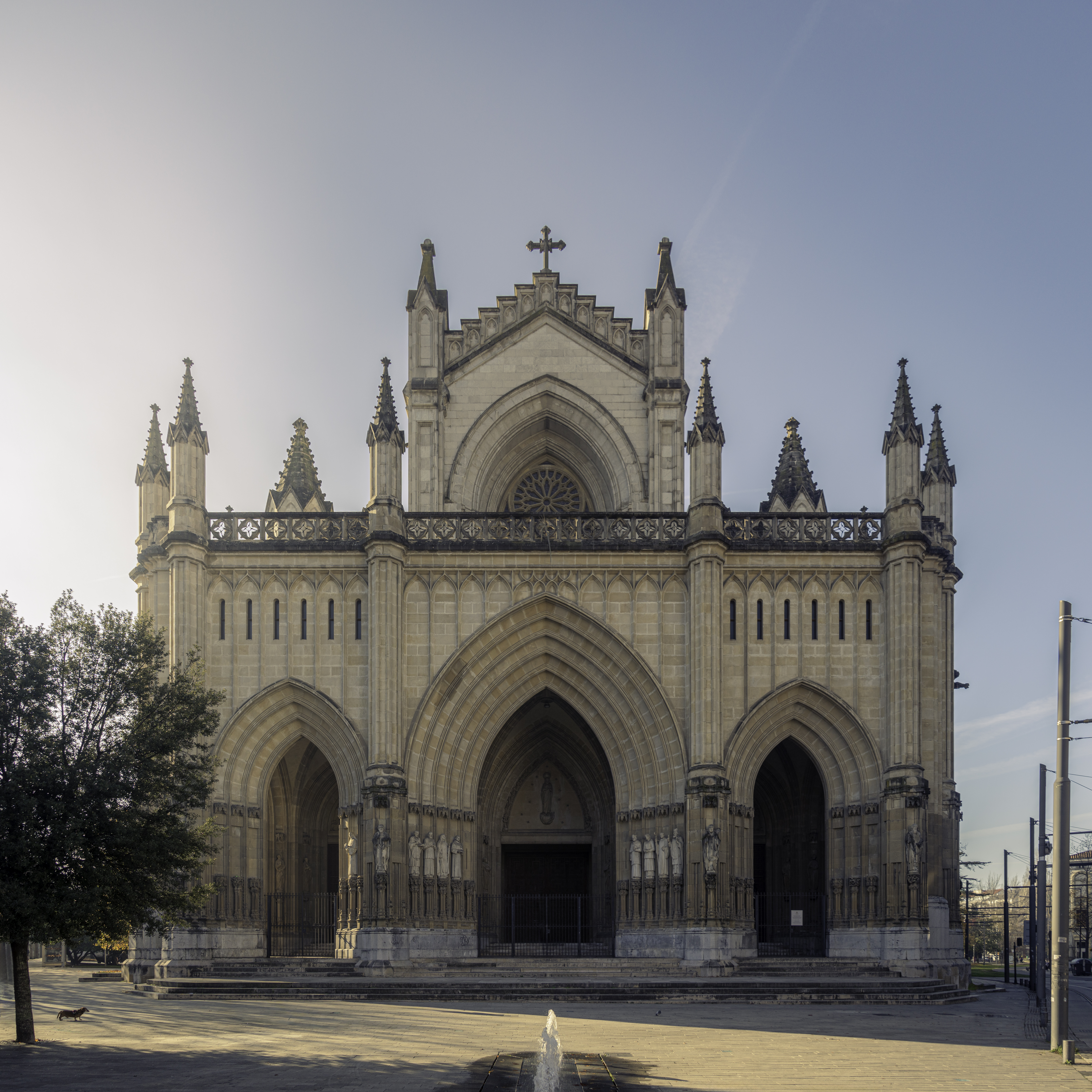
- Virgen Blanca Square Panoramic view Old Cathedral Ataria Plaza Nueva New Cathedral

- Flag Coat of arms
- Motto: Haec est Victoria quae vincit (This is Victoria which triumphs)
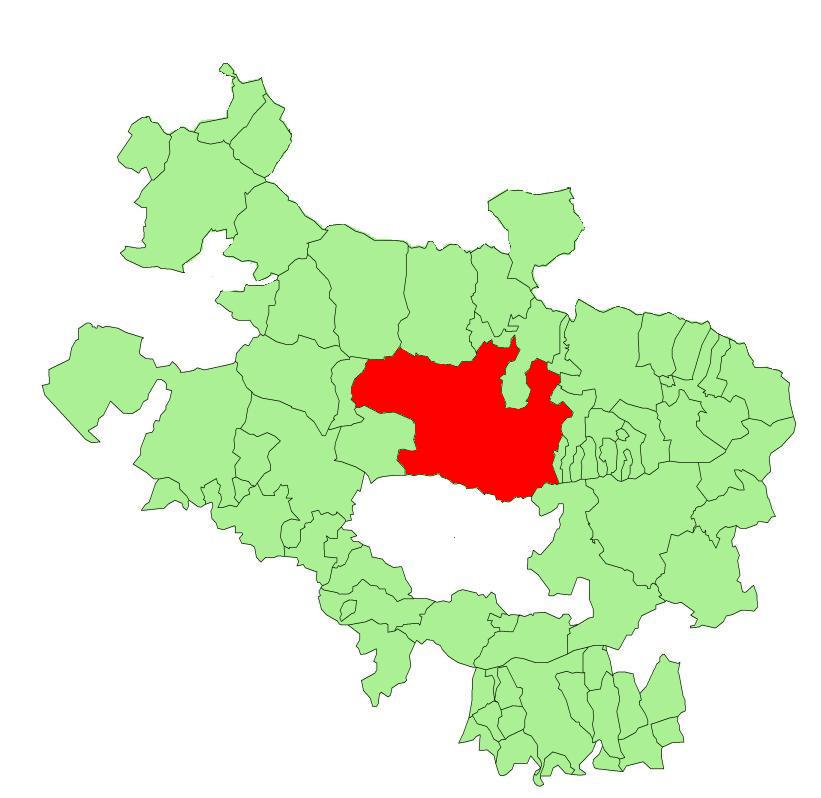
- Location of Vitoria-Gasteiz in Álava Province

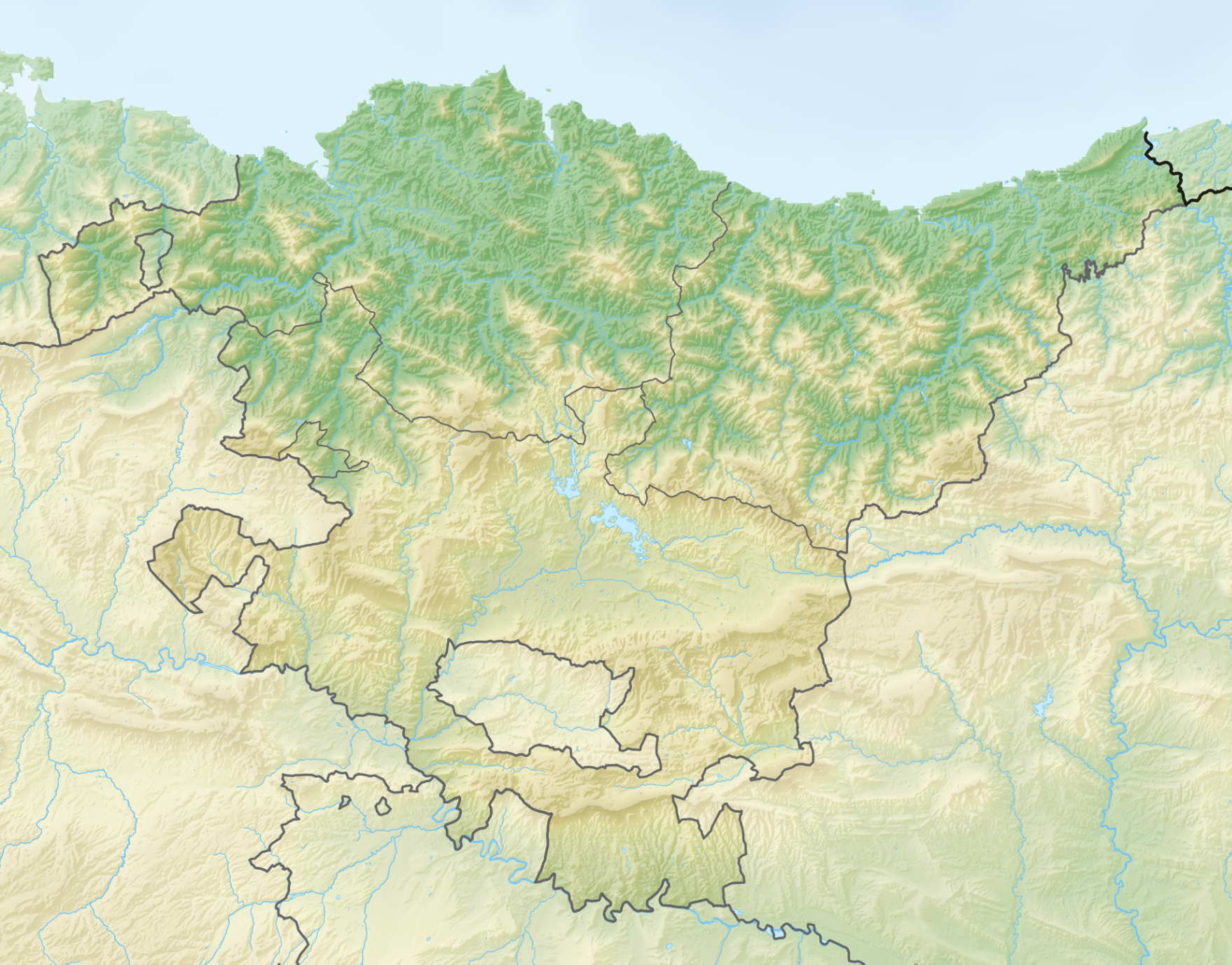
- Location of Vitoria-Gasteiz within Spain / the Basque Autonomous Country Vitoria-Gasteiz (the Basque Country) Vitoria-Gasteiz (Europe)
- Coordinates: 42°51′N 2°41′W
- Country: Spain
- Autonomous community: Basque Country
- Province: Álava
- Comarca: Vitoria-Gasteiz
- Founded: 1181

Government
  - Mayor: Maider Etxebarria (2023) (PSE-EE)

Area
  - Total: 276.96 km^{2} (106.93 sq mi)
- Elevation: 525 m (1,722 ft)

Population (2025)
  - Total: 260,402
  - Density: 940.22/km^{2} (2,435.1/sq mi)
- Demonym(s): Basque: gasteiztar Spanish: vitoriano, vitoriana
- Time zone: UTC+1 (CET)
  - Summer (DST): UTC+2 (CEST)
- Postal code: 01001–01015
- Official language(s): Spanish, Basque
- Website: vitoria-gasteiz.org

Vitoria-Gasteiz (Spanish: [biˈtoɾja ɣasˈtejθ]; Basque: [bitoɾia ɣas̺teis̻]; also historically spelled Vittoria in English) is the seat of government and the capital city of the Basque Country and of the province of Álava in northern Spain. It holds the autonomous community's House of Parliament, the headquarters of the Government, and the Lehendakari's official residency.

The municipality—which comprises not only the city but also the mainly agricultural lands of 63 villages around—is the largest in the Basque Country, with a total area of 276.96 square kilometres (106.93 sq mi). With a population of 260,402 as of 2025, it is also the 2nd most populous city in the Basque Country, as well as the 17th-largest in Spain. The inhabitants of Vitoria-Gasteiz are called vitorianos or gasteiztarrak, while traditionally they are dubbed babazorros (Basque for 'bean sacks').

Vitoria-Gasteiz is a city that specialises in health-care, aeronautics, the automotive industry, and viticulture. It is the first Spanish municipality to be awarded the title of European Green Capital (in 2012) and it has been also recognized by the UN with the Global Green City Award (in 2019). The old town has preserved medieval streets and plazas in the region and it is one of very few cities with two cathedrals. The city also holds well known festivals such as the Azkena rock festival, FesTVal, Vitoria-Gasteiz jazz festival, and the Virgen Blanca Festivities. The city is often ranked as one with the highest standard of living among all cities in Spain, and first as to green areas and cultural places per capita.

Vitoria-Gasteiz's vicinity is home to acclaimed wineries such as Ysios, designed by architect Santiago Calatrava, and Marqués de Riscal, by Frank Gehry. Relevant heritage sites including the Neolithic remains of Aizkomendi, Sorginetxe and La chabola de la Hechicera; Iron Age remains such as the settlements of Lastra and Buradón; antique remains such as the settlement of La Hoya and the salt valley of Añana; and several medieval fortresses including the Tower of Mendoza and the Tower of Varona.

Ludwig van Beethoven dedicated his Opus 91, often called the "Battle of Vitoria" or "Wellington's Victory", to one of the most famous events of the Napoleonic Wars: the Battle of Vitoria, in which a Spanish, Portuguese and British army under the command of General the Duke of Wellington broke the French army and nearly captured the puppet king Joseph Bonaparte. It was a pivotal point in the Peninsular War, and a precursor to the expulsion of the French army from Spain. A memorial statue can be seen today in Virgen Blanca Square.

== Name ==
The official name of Vitoria-Gasteiz is a compound name of its traditional names in Spanish and Basque, respectively. By inhabitants, it is still generally referred to as either Vitoria or Gasteiz, depending on the language spoken. More rarely, it may be referred to by Basque speakers as Vitorixe, a Basque form of the Spanish name.

== History ==
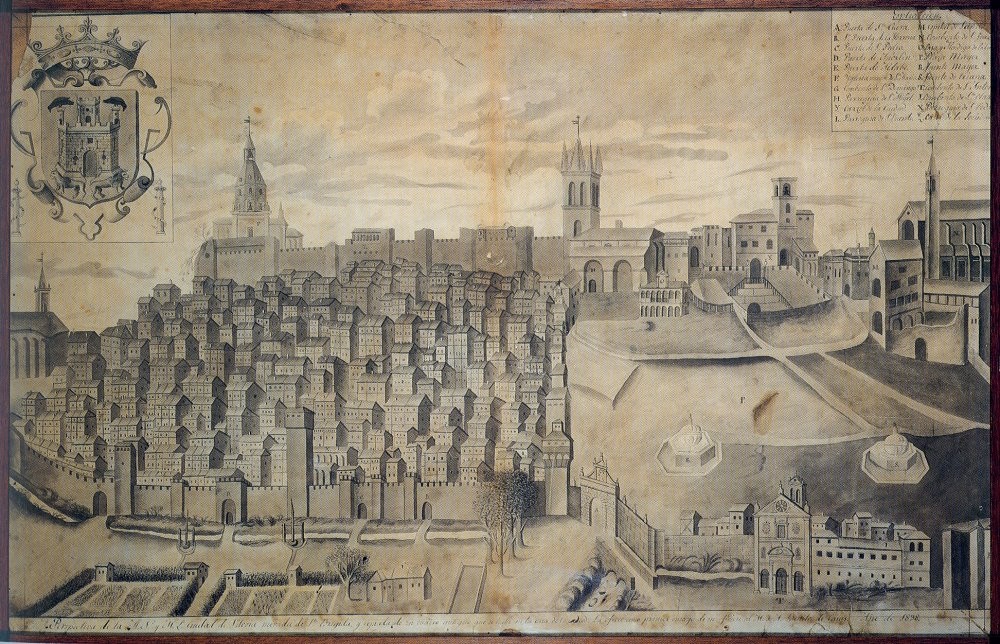
Vitoria-Gasteiz in the 17th century

In 581 AD, the Visigoth king Liuvigild founded the city of Victoriacum, trying to emulate the Roman foundations, as a celebration of the victory against the Vascones near what is assumed to be the hill occupied by the primitive village of Gasteiz. This however is not sufficiently proven, and some historians and experts believe that Victoriacum was located not on the site of present-day Vitoria-Gasteiz but nearby. Several possible locations have been proposed, the foremost of which is the late Roman military camp of Iruña-Veleia (cf. J. M. Lacarra). Veleia is located some 11 km north of modern Vitoria, on the banks of the same river. However, modern archeological studies of the site suggest that Veleia was last inhabited c. 5th century AD, and archeologists are still to find a 6th-century Visigothic resettlement in the site. Another theory has suggested that Victoriacum was located at the foot of Mount Gorbea where there is a village called Vitoriano. The town of Armentia, nowadays in the outskirts of Vitoria, has also been proposed as a possible location of Victoriacum. In either case, Victoriacum vanishes from history shortly after its foundation.

In 1181, Sancho the Wise, King of Navarre, founded the town of Nova Victoria as a defensive outpost on top of a hill at the site of the previous settlement of Gasteiz. The existence of Gastehiz, apparently inhabited by Vasconic people, can be traced back to the Middle Ages; it is certain that by the 11th century, prior to the foundation of Nova Victoria, the settlement was already walled. It is assumed that Sancho the Wise gave the new city its name in memory of the old settlement of Victoriacum, which must had long since been abandoned. In 1199, the town was besieged for nine months and eventually captured by the troops of Alfonso VIII of Castile, who annexed the town to the Kingdom of Castile. The town was progressively enlarged and in 1431 it was granted a city charter by King Juan II of Castile. In 1463, it was one of the five founding villas of the Brotherhood of Álava alongside Sajazarra, Miranda de Ebro, Pancorbo and Salvatierra/Agurain.

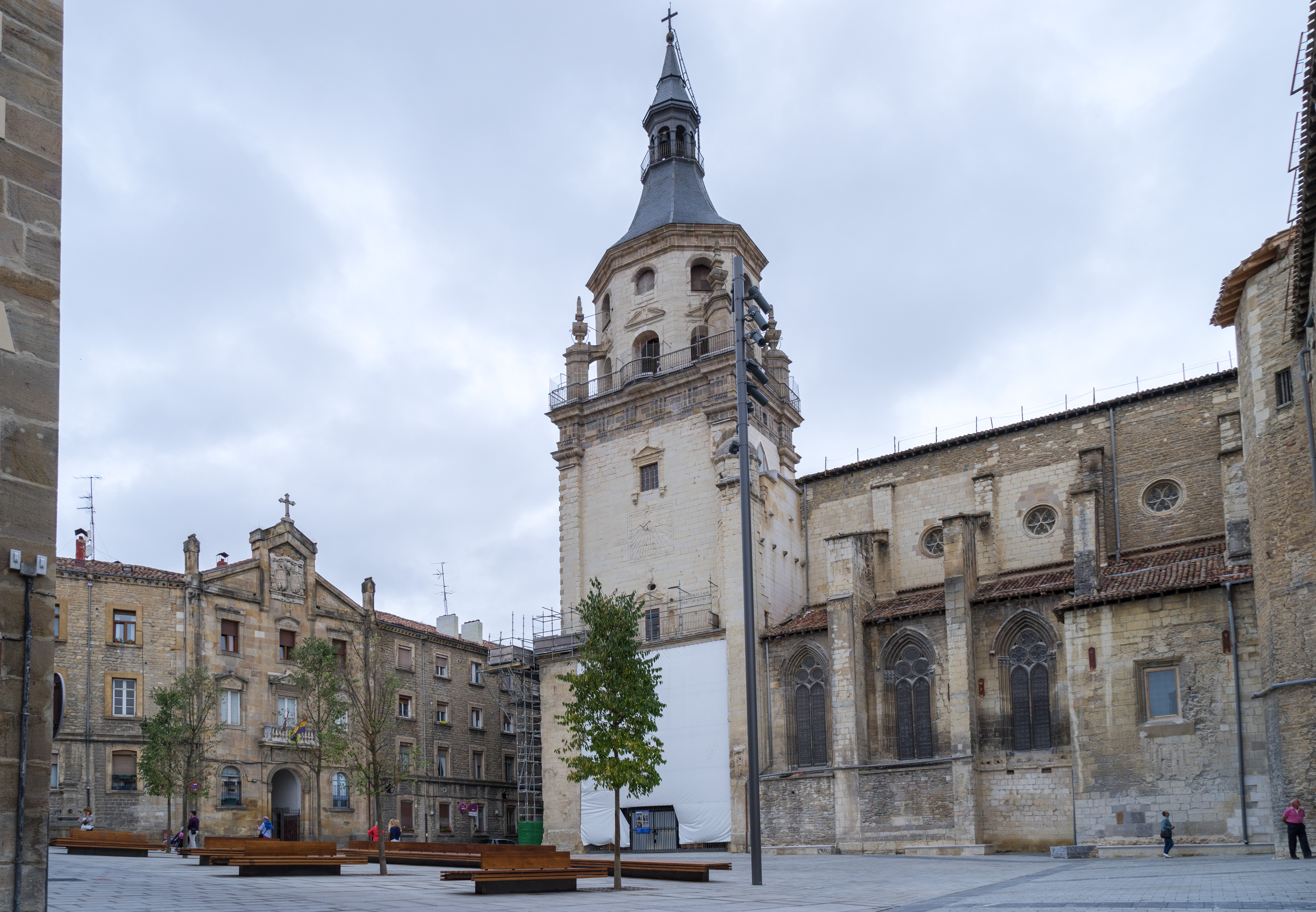
Cathedral of Santa María de Vitoria, completed in the 17th century

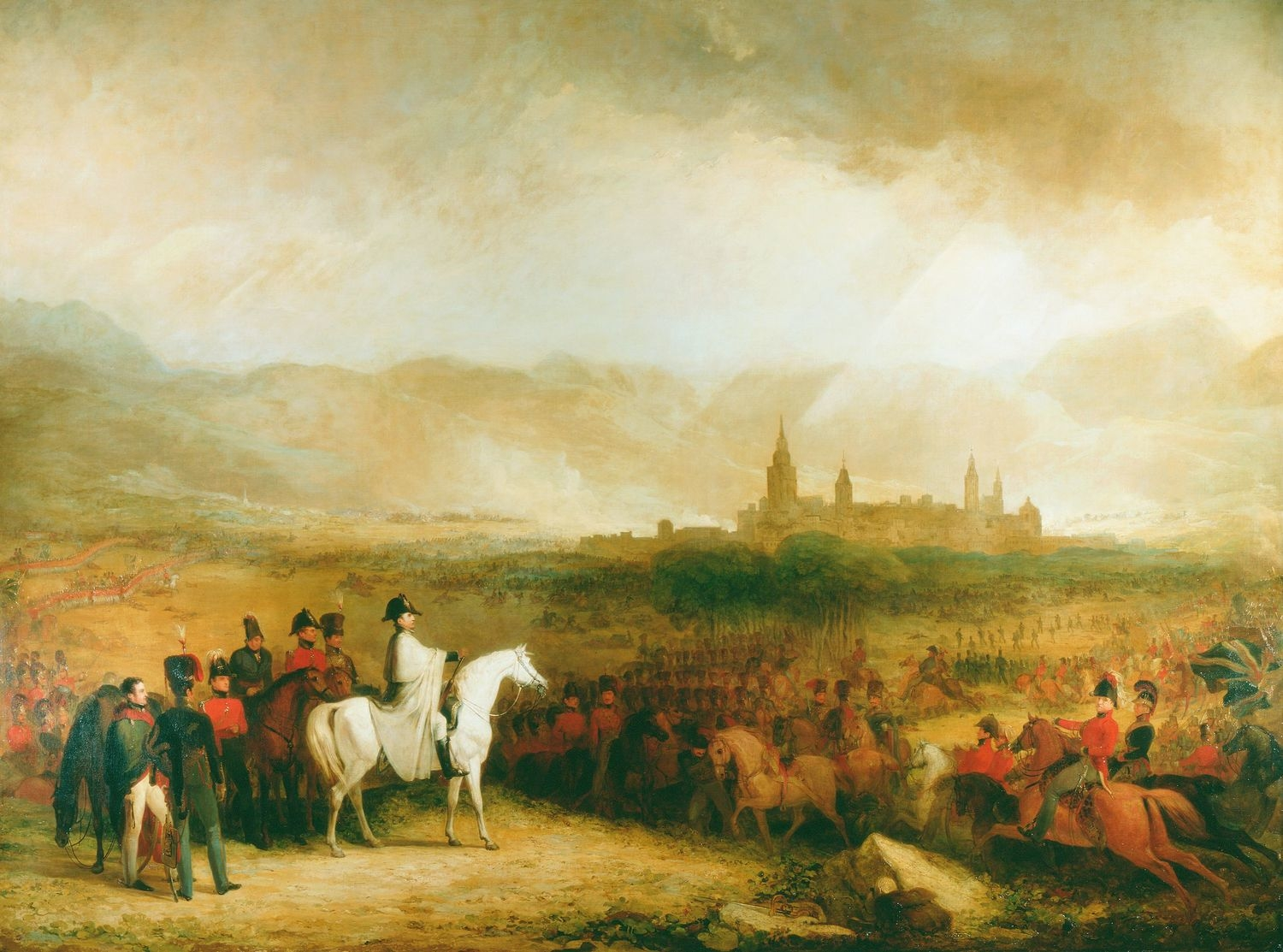
The Battle of Vittoria by George Jones depicting the 1813 battle.

The Battle of Vitoria of the Peninsular War occurred near Vitoria-Gasteiz along the river Zadorra on 21 June 1813. An allied British, Portuguese, and Spanish army under General the Marquess of Wellington broke the French army under Joseph Bonaparte and Marshal Jean-Baptiste Jourdan. The victory assured the eventual end of French control in Spain. There is a monument commemorating this battle in the main square of the city known as the Monument to Independence.

When news came to Vienna in late July of that year, Johann Nepomuk Mälzel commissioned Ludwig van Beethoven to compose a symphony, the op. 91 Wellingtons Sieg oder die Schlacht bei Vittoria (Wellington's Victory, or the Battle of Vitoria) or Siegessymphonie.

Work began on the Institute for Middle Education in 1843, with classes beginning during the 1853–54 academic year. It is now current headquarters of the Basque Parliament and formerly the convent of Santa Clara. The Free University opened in the wake of the revolution of 1868. The university operated from 1869, to just prior to the 1873–1874 term, largely because of the second Carlist War. Some of its most notable academics were Ricardo Becerro de Bengoa, Julián Apraiz and Federico Baraibar. The latter was also among the first teachers of Basque in Vitoria-Gasteiz as an off-syllabus subject.

=== Spanish Civil War ===
At the start of the Spanish Civil War Álava and Vitoria were easily captured by the rebel Nationalists led by General Angel García Benítez, assisted by Colonel Camilo Alonso Vega. Vitoria was captured on 19 July 1936. In November 1936 an attempt by Republicans to retake Vitoria was thwarted after being spotted by Nationalist reconnaissance aircraft. The 1937 Nationalist campaign in Vizcaya was supported by 80 German aircraft based at Vitoria, where the Condor Legion fighter wing was concentrated.

=== Transition to democracy ===
During the Spanish transition to democracy, the Church of St. Francis of Assisi was the scene of a police shooting on March 3, 1976 during a peaceful labour assembly. Under the orders of Interior Minister Manuel Fraga, the police shot tear-gas into the church where 5,000 demonstrators and others had met, firing on them as they struggled their way out of the building. It resulted in five dead and over one hundred wounded by gunshot.

On 20 May 1980, by decision of the Basque Parliament, Vitoria-Gasteiz became the place of the common institutions of the Basque Autonomous Community.

=== Judizmendi ===
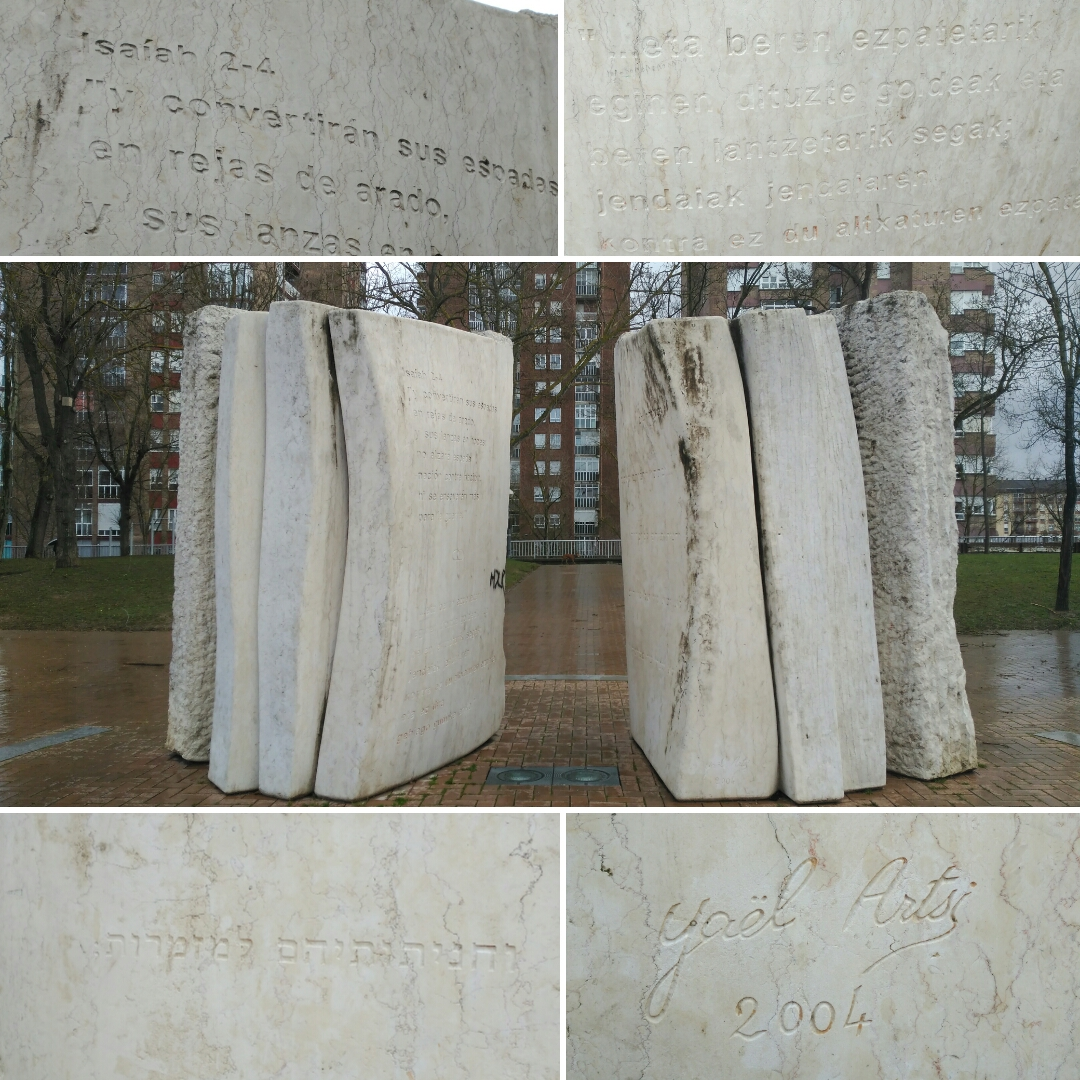
"Coexistence" by Yael Artsi.

Historically, there once was a Jewish community living in Vitoria, before the expulsion of the Jews. In 1492, the year of the expulsion, the town council agreed to maintain and respect the Jewish cemetery, which became known as Judimendi, or "mountain of the Jews" in Basque. Over time, linguistically, "Judimendi" became "Judizmendi." Unique to anywhere else in Spain, the town maintained this agreement from 1492-1952, when the town undertook plans to convert Judizmendi to a public garden. The Jewish community in Bayonne heard about these plans, and convinced the city government of Vitoria-Gasteiz to commemorate the memory of the cemetery. In 2004, Israeli artist Yaël Artsi created the monument "Coexistence" to be displayed at Judizmendi.

In 2017, the monument was vandalized with anti-semitic graffiti twice: once in April, and once in May.

In 2019, the Basque Jewish community held a ceremony to pay tribute to the city for honoring its promise to the Jews.

== Climate ==
Vitoria-Gasteiz has an oceanic climate (Köppen climate classification: Cfb). Winters are much cooler than in lowland coastal areas, whilst summers are similar in terms of high temperatures, with cool nights due to the elevation. Summers show a significant influence of mediterranean precipitation patterns, but enough precipitation usually occurs to remain marine in nature. Sunshine levels are low by Spanish standards and the climate is humid year-round.

Climate data for Foronda-Txokiza 513m (1981–2010)
Month	Jan	Feb	Mar	Apr	May	Jun	Jul	Aug	Sep	Oct	Nov	Dec	Year
Record high °C (°F)	18.7 (65.7)	21.5 (70.7)	26.6 (79.9)	29.1 (84.4)	33.0 (91.4)	37.4 (99.3)	38.4 (101.1)	40.8 (105.4)	37.2 (99.0)	29.3 (84.7)	22.2 (72.0)	20.3 (68.5)	40.8 (105.4)
Mean daily maximum °C (°F)	8.7 (47.7)	10.3 (50.5)	13.7 (56.7)	15.4 (59.7)	19.3 (66.7)	23.0 (73.4)	25.7 (78.3)	25.9 (78.6)	23.1 (73.6)	18.3 (64.9)	12.4 (54.3)	9.1 (48.4)	17.1 (62.8)
Daily mean °C (°F)	4.9 (40.8)	5.7 (42.3)	8.2 (46.8)	9.8 (49.6)	13.3 (55.9)	16.6 (61.9)	19.0 (66.2)	19.2 (66.6)	16.6 (61.9)	12.9 (55.2)	8.2 (46.8)	5.5 (41.9)	11.7 (53.1)
Mean daily minimum °C (°F)	1.2 (34.2)	1.1 (34.0)	2.7 (36.9)	4.1 (39.4)	7.2 (45.0)	10.2 (50.4)	12.3 (54.1)	12.5 (54.5)	10.1 (50.2)	7.5 (45.5)	4.0 (39.2)	1.9 (35.4)	6.2 (43.2)
Record low °C (°F)	−17.8 (0.0)	−15.4 (4.3)	−9.2 (15.4)	−3.8 (25.2)	−2.2 (28.0)	1.0 (33.8)	3.2 (37.8)	0.8 (33.4)	0.2 (32.4)	−2.7 (27.1)	−9.4 (15.1)	−11.5 (11.3)	−17.8 (0.0)
Average precipitation mm (inches)	75 (3.0)	63 (2.5)	63 (2.5)	73 (2.9)	70 (2.8)	43 (1.7)	38 (1.5)	39 (1.5)	41 (1.6)	71 (2.8)	91 (3.6)	82 (3.2)	742 (29.2)
Average precipitation days (≥ 1 mm)	10	10	8	11	9	6	4	5	6	9	11	11	99
Average snowy days	3	3	2	1	0	0	0	0	0	0	1	2	11
Average relative humidity (%)	83	79	72	72	71	70	70	70	72	77	82	84	75
Mean monthly sunshine hours	83	108	148	163	196	218	244	226	178	144	92	75	1,886
Source: Agencia Estatal de Meterología

== Demographics ==
Historical population
Year	Pop.	±%
1842	15,162	—
1857	22,632	+49.3%
1877	28,543	+26.1%
1887	30,279	+6.1%
1900	34,234	+13.1%
1910	35,824	+4.6%
1920	37,495	+4.7%
1930	41,754	+11.4%
1940	49,303	+18.1%
1950	50,257	+1.9%
1960	69,849	+39.0%
1970	134,086	+92.0%
1981	189,533	+41.4%
1991	206,116	+8.7%
2001	216,852	+5.2%
2011	240,753	+11.0%
2021	252,953	+5.1%
Source: INE

As of 2025, the population is 260,402, of whom 48.7% are male and 51.3% are female. People under 16 years old make up 14.3% of the population, and people over 65 years old make up 22.9%.

=== Immigration ===
As of 2025, the foreign-born population is 47,206, making up 18.1% of the total population. The 5 largest foreign countries of origin are Colombia (9,503), Morocco (5,759), Algeria (2,785), Venezuela (2,450) and Peru (2,044).

Foreign population by country of birth (2025)
Country	Population
Colombia	9,503
Morocco	5,759
Algeria	2,785
Venezuela	2,450
Peru	2,044
Paraguay	1,835
Pakistan	1,830
Ecuador	1,503
Nigeria	1,432
Brazil	1,383
Dominican Republic	1,335
Argentina	954
Romania	838
China	820
Bolivia	813

== Subdivisions ==
=== Councils ===
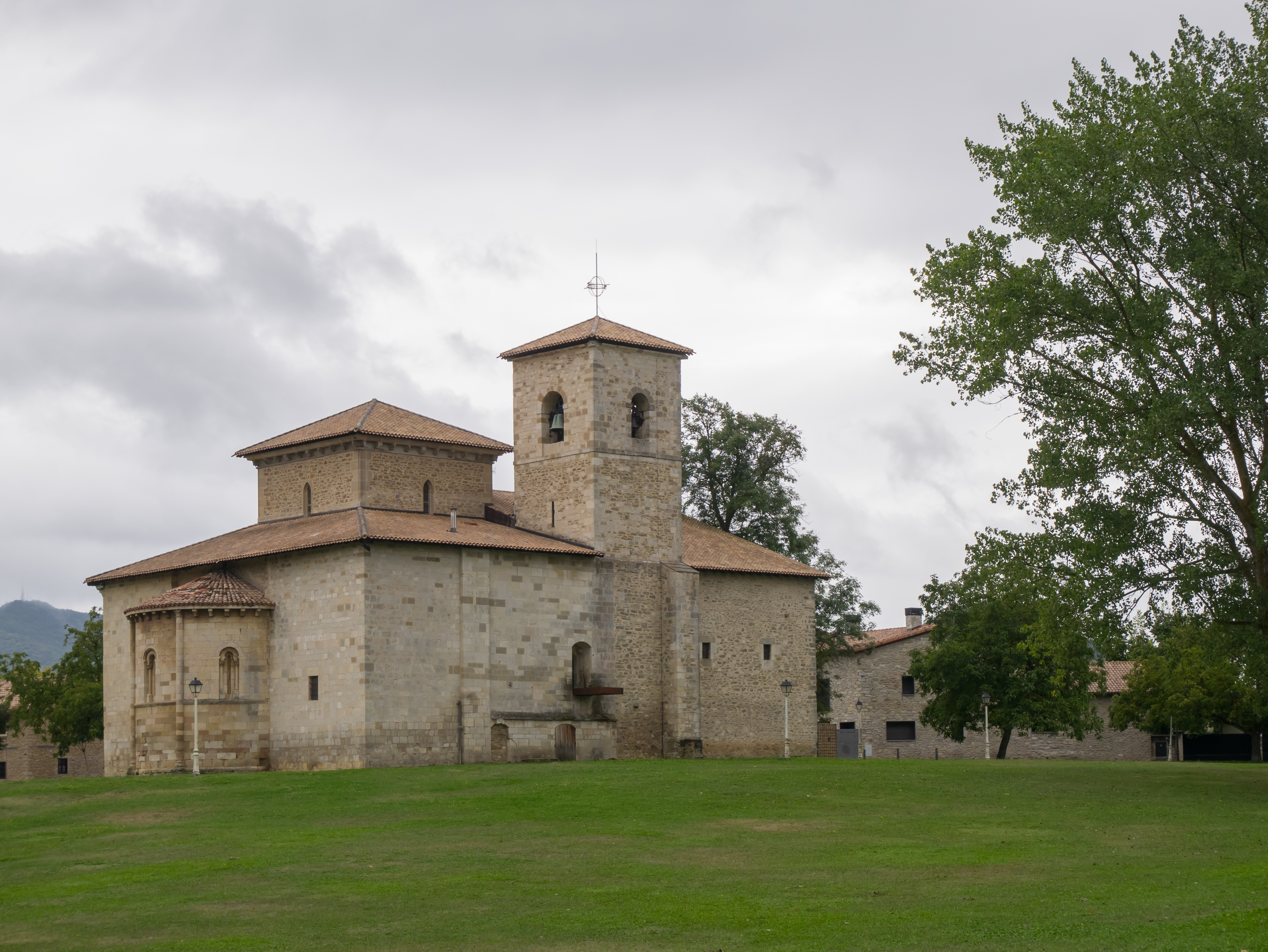
Basilica of San Prudencio, located in Armentia

The municipality of Vitoria has subsumed a number of rural villages, which are preserved as concejos, retaining a certain degree of administrative autonomy.

- Abetxuko
- Aberásturi
- Amarita
- Andollu
- Antezana/Andetxa
- Aranbizkarra
- Arangiz
- Arkauti - Arcaute
- Arkaia
- Aretxabaleta
- Argandoña
- Aríñez - Ariñiz
- Armentia
- Arriaga
- Askartza
- Asteguieta
- Berrostegieta
- Betoño
- Bolibar
- Castillo - Gaztelu
- Ehari-Ali
- Elorriaga
- Eskibel
- Estarrona
- Foronda
- Gamarra Mayor - Gamarra Nagusia
- Gamarra Menor - Gamarra Gutxia
- Gamiz
- Gardelegi
- Gobeo
- Gometxa
- Guereña
- Hueto Abajo - Otobarren
- Hueto Arriba - Otogoien
- Ilarratza
- Jungitu
- Krispiña - Crispijana
- Lasarte
- Legarda
- Lermanda
- Lopidana
- Lubiano
- Margarita
- Martioda
- Matauko
- Mendiguren
- Mendiola
- Mendoza
- Miñano Mayor - Miñao
- Miñano Menor - Miñao Gutxia
- Monasterioguren
- Oreitia
- Otazu
- Retana
- Subijana de Álava - Subillana-Gasteiz
- Ullíbarri Arrazua
- Ullibarri de los Olleros - Uribarri Nagusia
- Ullibarri-Viña - Uribarri-Dibiña
- Villafranca
- Yurre-Ihurre
- Zerio
- Zuazo de Vitoria - Zuhatzu
- Zumeltzu

== Politics ==
In 2023, Maider Etxebarria (PSE-EE PSOE) was elected to a four-year term as Mayor in coalition with EAJ-PNV and support from PP. The current municipal composition is as follows:

- EH Bildu - 7
- PSE-EE PSOE - 6
- People's Party - 6
- EAJ-PNV - 6
- Elkarrekin Podemos - 2

== Attractions ==
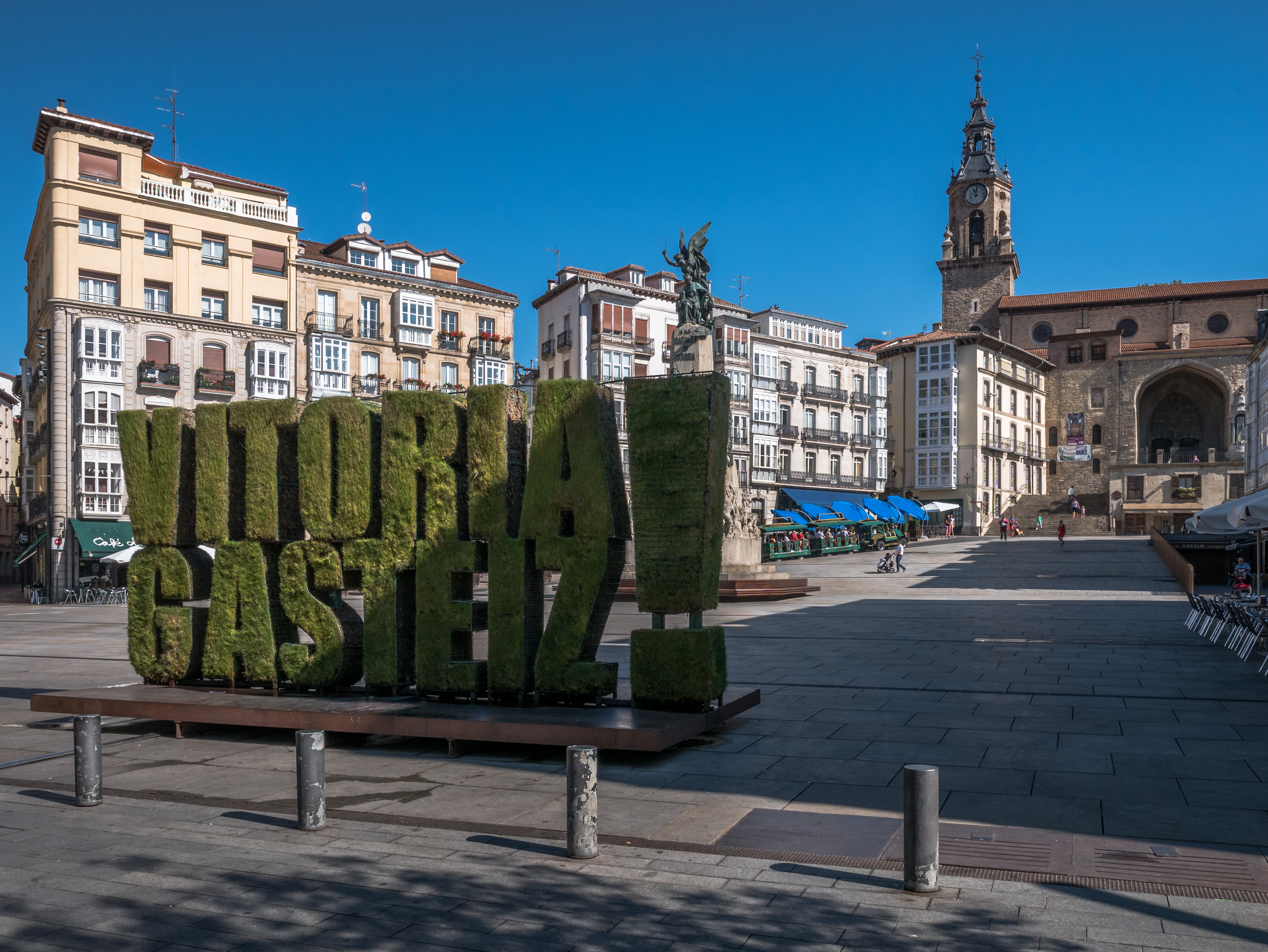
San Miguel Arcangel Church and the Virgen Blanca Square

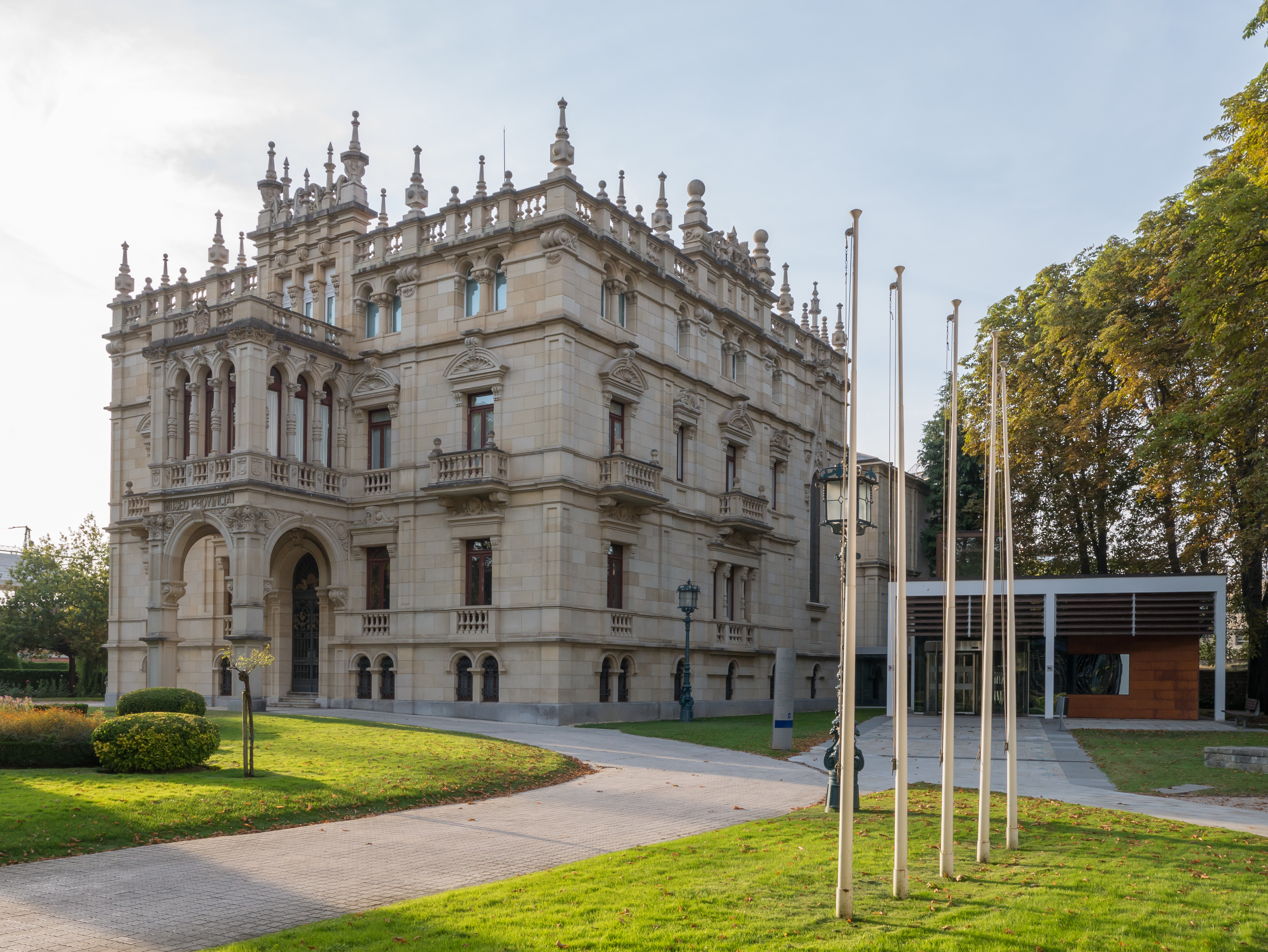
Museum of Fine Arts of Alava

- Cathedral of Santa Maria (Old Cathedral), a 14th-century Gothic building with a 17th-century tower. Under the pórtico are three open doorways decorated with statues and reliefs. In the interior, chapels containing Gothic, Flemish and Italian Renaissance images including paintings by Rubens and van Dyck. The cathedral is undergoing restoration and has been studied by experts from around the world for its architectural curiosities, including those deformations which it has suffered due to previous restorations.
- Cathedral of María Inmaculada of Vitoria (New Cathedral), built and consecrated in the 20th century, in Gothic Revival style.
- Andre Maria Zuriaren plaza/Plaza de la Virgen Blanca. It is a square to which converge some of the most typical streets of the old town and the 19th-century city expansion and is surrounded by old houses with glass verandas. At its center stands a monument commemorating the Battle of Vitoria.
- Diocesan Museum of Sacred Art of Álava, located in Cathedral of María Inmaculada ambulatory, houses samples of religious art heritage of the province, divided into sections of stone carving, wood carving, painting on wood, paint on canvas, jewelry and furniture liturgical.
- Church of St. Peter the Apostle (14th century) in Gothic style. The Old Portico, with a set of reliefs depicting scenes from the lives of St. Peter and the Virgin Mary, run under the pictures of the Virgin and the apostles.
- Church of St. Michael the Archangel (14th–16th centuries), in Gothic-Renaissance style. Its portico has an image of the Virgen Blanca, patron saint of the city. Inside is an altarpiece by Gregorio Fernández.
- Church of San Vicente Mártir. A late Gothic building from the 15th and 16th centuries.
- Church of the Carmen. A neoclassical temple built between 1897 and 1900.
- Basilica of San Prudencio. Its original construction dates to the 12th century, but it was rebuilt in the 18th century. The temple houses sculptural samples from different eras and artists.
- Sanctuary of Nuestra Señora of Estibaliz. Located in the town of Argandoña, 8 kilometres (5 miles) from Vitoria-Gasteiz, it dates to the 11th century.
- Convent of Saint Anthony. A Clares nunnery from the 17th century.
- Convent of Santa Cruz. Dominican nunnery from the 17th century.
- Former hospice (16th–17th centuries), originally the Colegio de San Prudencio.
- Old Portico, Church of San Pedro.
- Casa del Cordón, an example of civil Gothic architecture. It was built in the 15th century, but has kept a tower from the 13th century. The Catholic Monarchs stayed here, and Adrian VI was named Pope while residing here.
- Basque Museum of Contemporary Art (Artium). Its permanent collection is considered one of the best and most important contemporary art in Basque and Spanish. It was inaugurated on April 26, 2002.
- Museum of Natural Sciences, located in the Tower of Otxanda Andrea, an example of medieval architecture. It is also a center for research and dissemination of Natural Sciences.
- Museum of Archaeology, located in a house of wood lattice from the 16th century. The exhibition includes dolmens, Roman sculptures found in Álava, and medieval pieces.
- Fournier Museum of Playing Cards, in the Bendaña palace. Vitoria-Gasteiz is known for the manufacture of playing cards. More than 6,000 cards are displayed in the museum.
- Museum of Fine Arts, housed in a Renaissance mansion. It displays 14th-century carvings, Flemish 16th-century triptychs, panels of Spanish masters such as Jusepe de Ribera and modern Spanish paintings.
- Arms Museum of Álava is home to weapons from various ages, from prehistoric axes to 20th-century handguns. There is a large collection of medieval weaponry and reconstruction of the Battle of Vitoria.
- Montehermoso Cultural Center, housed in restored 16th-century buildings, formerly headquarters of the Diocese of Vitoria. In 1997, with the annexation of the former water tank, the property became the Montehermoso Cultural Center, designed as a space for art exhibitions and musical performances.
- Plaza de España or Plaza Nueva. A large arcaded plaza designed by the architect Antonio de Olaguibel in 1781 and designed to unite the old town with the new Story, then under construction.
- Plaza de los Fueros. A triangular square used as a market and for other entertainment activities. It was designed by Eduardo Chillida.
- The Arkupe/Arquillos. This road was built with porticoes between the 18th and 19th centuries.
- Ajuria Enea, the seat of President of the Basque Government (Lehendakari) since 1980. It was built in 1918 as the main residence of the family of the local entrepreneur Serafin Ajuria, and it is a fine example of the Basque architecture of the period.
- Ataria, an information and interpretation centre for the wetlands of Salburua, an important nature park on the eastern edge of the city.
- Sequoia of Vitoria-Gasteiz, a 40-metre tall tree dating back to 1860
- At the squatted neighbourhood of Errekaleor Bizirik, there are murals by artists including Blu.
- Victims of Terrorism Memorial Centre, opened by the King and Queen of Spain on 1 June 2021.

== Culture ==
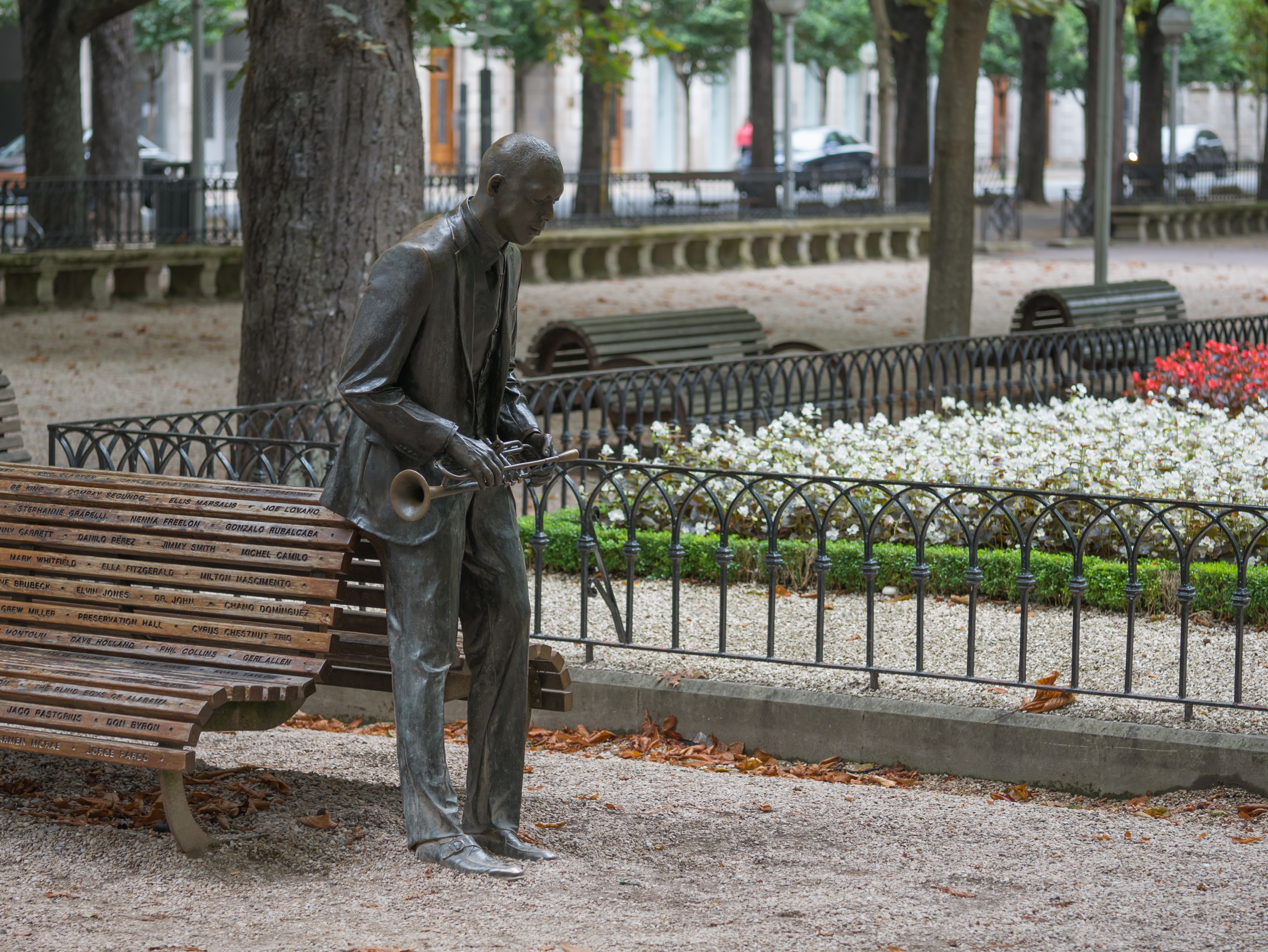
Sculpture of Wynton Marsalis, the bench shows names of musicians who performed at the Vitoria-Gasteiz Jazz Festival over the years

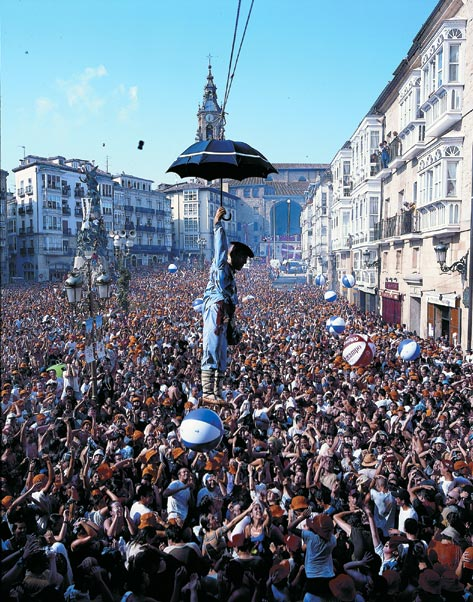
Andre Maria Zuriaren jaiak festival

=== Music ===
Vitoria-Gasteiz hosts two annual international music festivals:

- The International Music Festival/Course Vitoria-Gasteiz, from 16th to 20 August (the 2023 Edition)
- The Vitoria-Gasteiz Jazz Festival, from 3 to 9 July (the 2023 Edition).
- The Azkena rock festival, on 15 to 17 June (the 2023 Edition).

=== Local festivities ===
The Andre Maria Zuriaren jaiak/Fiestas de la Virgen Blanca festival is celebrated every year from the 4th to the 9th of August in honour of the patron saint of the city, and features a programme of special events, activities and free open-air concerts.

San Prudencio Festival is also celebrated in late April.

Each neighborhood has its festival, most of them between April and September.

=== Universities ===
The liberal arts section of the University of the Basque Country is based in the south part of the city. Focusing on history and linguistics, the Álava campus is also home of the Faculty of Pharmacy, as well as some other technical, teaching and business related degrees. Its origins date back to 1847 when the first Escuela Normal de Maestros de Álava was established. A number of other colleges and faculties were adopted in 1978 by the emerging University of the Basque Country.

European University Gasteiz, a private initiative with a focus on health and sport sciences and new technologies, opened in 2022 in the district of Salburua, after receiving official recognition from the Basque Parliament.

== Economy ==
The economy of Vitoria-Gasteiz is diverse, and many manufacturing companies and logistic centers have operations there, including Mercedes-Benz, Michelin, Gamesa, and Heraclio Fournier, the latter being headquartered there.

== Transport ==
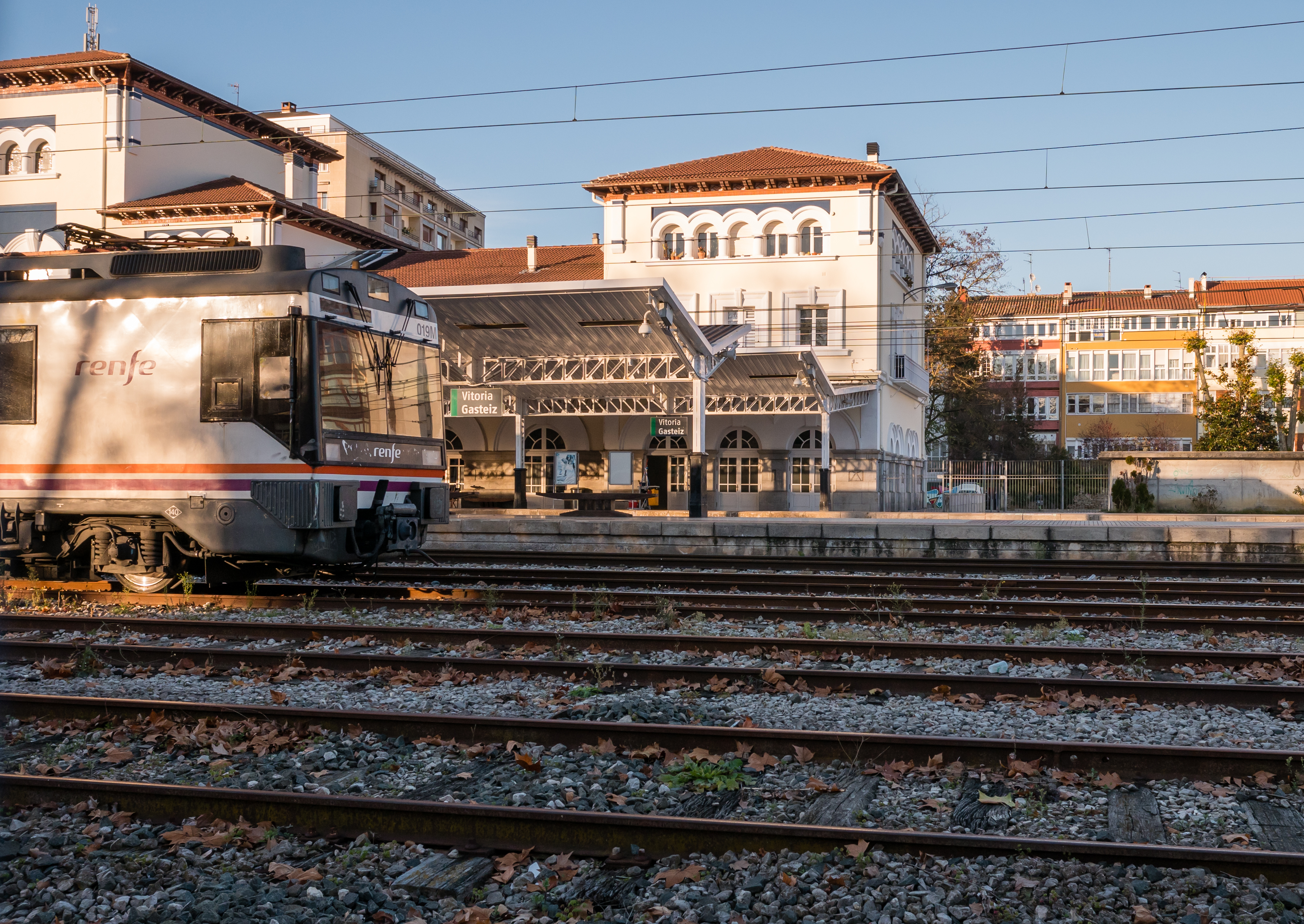
Railway station of Vitoria-Gasteiz

Public transport within the city consists of a city bus service operated by TUVISA (10 lines) and a tram network operated by Euskotren (2 lines sharing part of the way).

=== Roads ===
Vitoria-Gasteiz is well connected by road with the other Basque capitals and with Madrid. The N-622 road connects with the AP-68 motorway towards Bilbao. The A-1 motorway from Madrid to San Sebastián serves Vitoria-Gasteiz. Since 2009, the tolled AP-1 motorway has served as an alternative route towards San Sebastián and Burgos.

=== Railways ===
Vitoria-Gasteiz railway station is one of the main stops on the Madrid–Hendaye railway. Half a dozen Alvia trains link the city each day with Madrid, running partially on high-speed lines to reach Madrid in 3 hours 7 minutes. There are also connections to Barcelona. There is a complete lack of rail services to Andalusia and no direct rail link with Bilbao.

The Basque Y high-speed rail network is planned to connect Vitoria-Gasteiz with the French border, San Sebastián and Bilbao within 35 minutes. However, work on this project has been slow and there is no date for its inaugural run.

=== Aviation ===
Vitoria Airport is 4th in Spain in cargo traffic, it also offers some domestic and international passenger destinations. Bilbao Airport is 50 minutes away by car; a direct bus line from Vitoria-Gasteiz went into operation in 2024.

== Urbanism ==
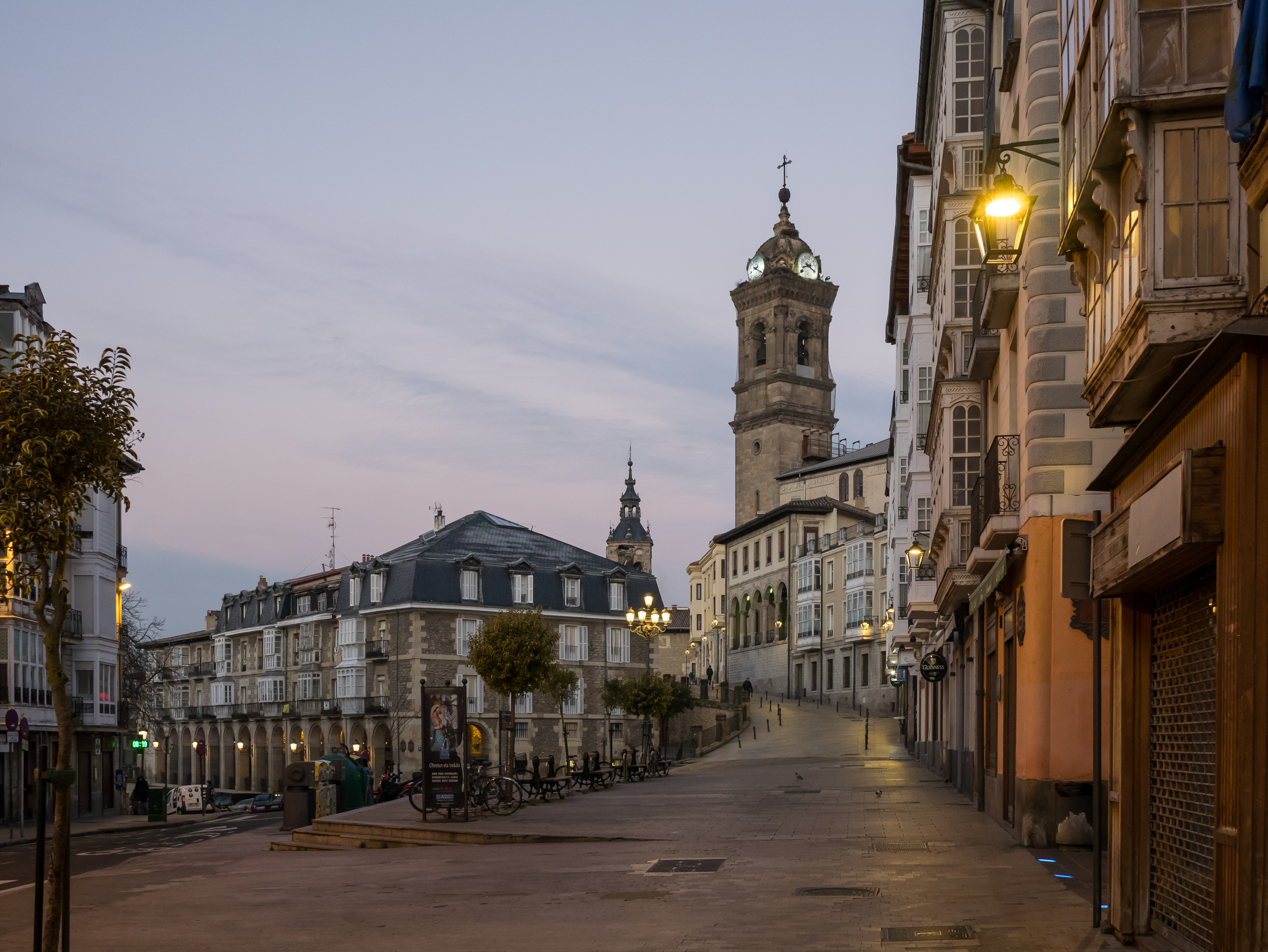
Streets in Vitoria-Gasteiz

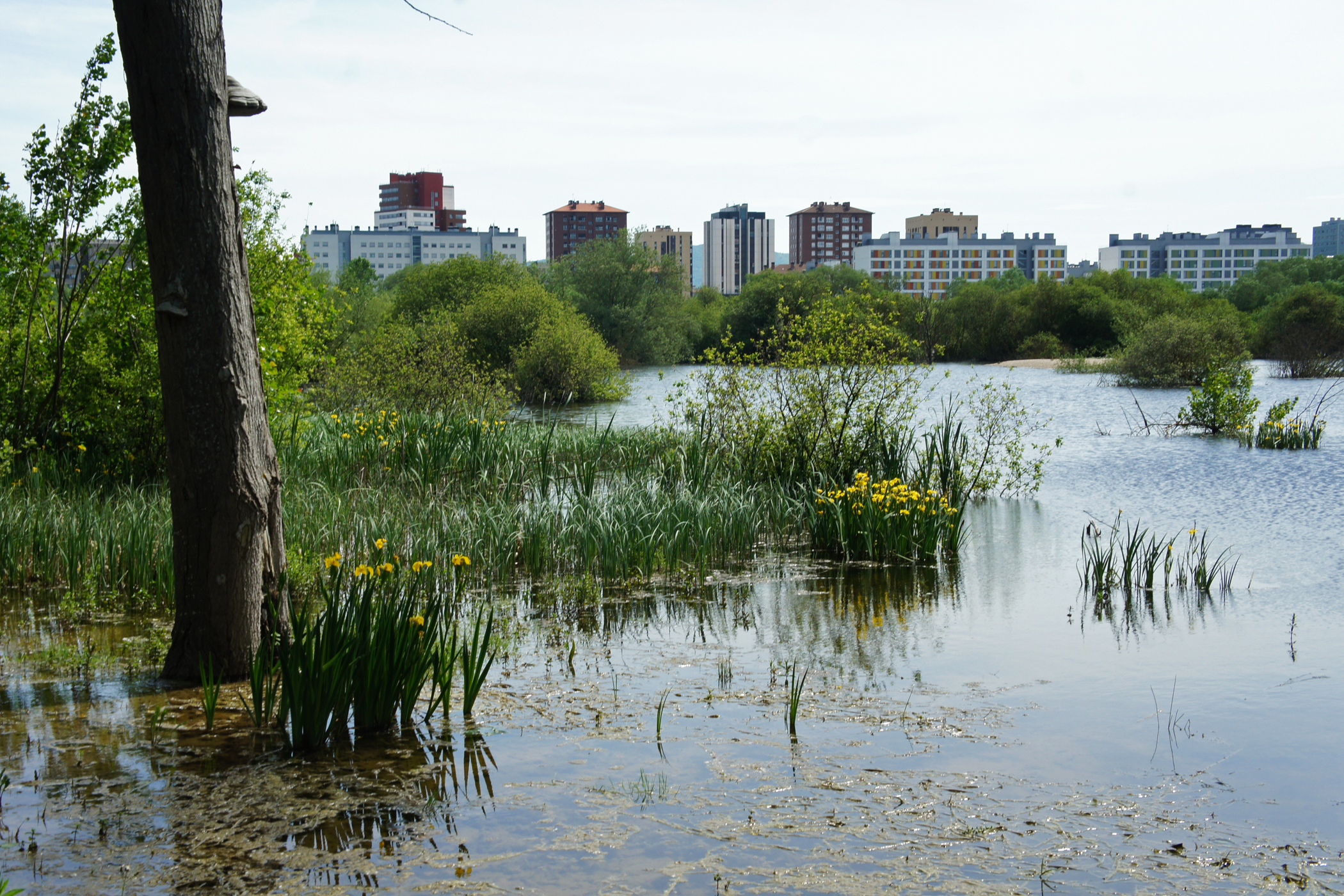
Salburua

From an urban point of view, Vitoria-Gasteiz is a mid-sized city, the line of which is adapted to the traditions of each historical moment. The medieval town is set in almond-shape around the hill foundation, which by its privileged position as the only elevation in the plain of Álava, became a defensive stronghold coveted by the kingdoms of Navarre and Castilla during the 11th and 12th centuries. The walled enclosure was built prior to the war between Castile and Navarre in the 11th century to defend the village. The defensive walls of old Gasteiz were built between the years 1050 and 1100. Because of that first defensive role, its narrow streets surrounding the oval resulted in compact rows of houses parallel both to each other and the medieval walls (of which only some sections and gates are preserved). Between the years 1854 and 1856, an epidemic of cholera served as the excuse for tearing down the gates, fortresses which provided access to the streets Run (fort of Nanclares), Shoe (fort of Soto) and Blacksmith (fort of Abendaño) and which served to protect every neighbourhood association. The entrance of the current Plaza de la Virgen Blanca was the site of Santa Clara, which was joined by the wall at the Convent of San Antonio. In the 19th century, in recognition that the city was small, an expansion was planned in the neoclassical style, and little by little planning for the city has given Vitoria-Gasteiz its current form.

The Old Quarter (Alde Zaharra/Casco Viejo), has many architectural jewels such as Bendaña Palace, the Fournier Museum of cards (erected in 1525 by Juan Lopez de Arrieta, on the site occupied before by the defensive tower built by Maeztu). The Ezkoriatza-Eskibel Palace, built by Claudio de Arciniega in the 15th century. The Villa Suso, where Martin Salinas, ambassador of Charles V dwelt (16th century). And the greatest historical treasure of Vitoria-Gasteiz: the Cathedral of Santa Maria (Old Cathedral).

The history of the Cathedral of Santa María (commonly known as Old Cathedral), is itself a synthesis of the history of Vitoria-Gasteiz. Built on the cemetery of the primitive village of Gasteiz (which today can be accessed through the excavations), the church of Santa María collapsed with the fire of 1202 and Alfonso VIII of Castile (who had conquered the city just 2 years earlier), ordered that it be rebuilt on the site of a former church. It was now to serve two very different purposes: regular religious services and weapon storage. Thus was born the Cathedral of Santa Maria, a fortress-like church that served as the entrance to the city. The project changed with the centuries, so that each modification was made without taking into account the previous. This was the case in the 15th century (when the church became collegiate), and finally in the 1960s, when it was decided to reverse the previous works of strengthening of the external walls and widen the windows, made purely for aesthetic reasons, which had severely damaged the stability of the building. Today, the cathedral is open again, and offers visitors guided trips exposing the recent archaeological findings. It has become one of the main attractions of Vitoria-Gasteiz. Ken Follett, author of "The Pillars of the Earth", said after his stay in the city that Santa Maria was one of the three most interesting cathedrals of the world.

From the Middle Ages to the 18th century, the population of Vitoria-Gasteiz and the layout of its streets remained almost unchanged. And it was not until the late 18th century, when growth required the expansion of the city outside. To solve the problem of the difference in height between the original kernel on the hill, and the plain below, the arches were erected and the Plaza De España or Plaza Nueva was built, which soften the transition from the old city to the 19th century neoclassical expansion of wide streets and gardens, the greatest examples of which are seen in the La Florida Park, and the Andre Maria Zuriaren Enparantza/Plaza de la Virgen Blanca, with its façade pulled viewpoints.

Finally, the new quarters of Vitoria-Gasteiz were built, in accordance with a development plan favouring parks, recreation areas and quality of life. While aiming to maintain the identity of the city, and drawing on the district of San Martín, the need to accommodate the growing population has led the city to concentrate its growth in the new neighbourhoods of Lakua, Salburua and Zabalgan. The city of Vitoria-Gasteiz has received several international awards for its urban development. Also worth mentioning is the green ring, a network of parks and green spaces around the city, destined to be the lung of the future Vitoria-Gasteiz, and link the city with the countryside. This ring is formed of the parks Salburua, Zabalgana, Armentia, Alegria river, Gamarra, Abetxuko and Atxa-Landaberde.

=== Greenery ===
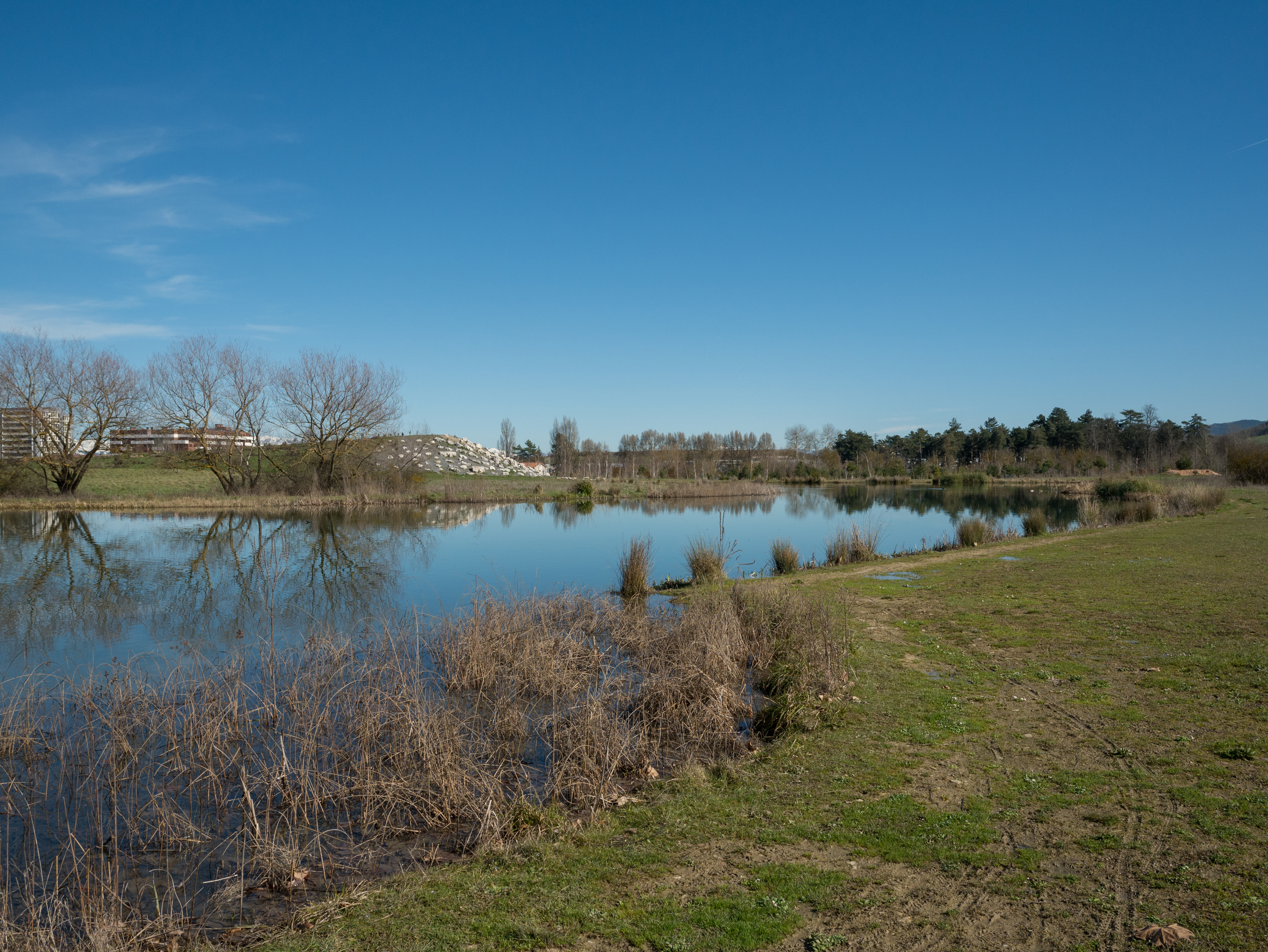
Olarizu, part of Vitoria-Gasteiz's green belt

Vitoria-Gasteiz held the title of European Green Capital in 2012 due to the high proportion of green public areas, ensuring that the entire population lives within 300m of an open green space, its biodiversity and ecosystems services, as well as for the city's green policies.

== Sports ==
- Deportivo Alavés, football team that won promotion to La Liga for the 2016–17 season after finishing first in Segunda División in the previous season but returned to 2nd division in the season 2021–2022 after finishing in last position (20th). Their home matches are played in the Mendizorrotza Stadium, with training facilities at the Ciudad Deportiva José Luis Compañón (Ibaia) on the edge of town. It also has a women's team which plays in the first division and the home matches are played at Ibaia. Other local teams play at the Betoño Sports Complex near the city centre, while Aurrerá and CD Vitoria are based at Olaranbe, another development on the periphery.
- Baskonia, one of the most successful basketball teams in the top professional Spanish division Liga Endesa with 4 league titles, winning their most recent one in 2020, also competes in the top professional European basketball division Turkish Airlines EuroLeague, finishing fourth in 2015–16. Home matches are played in the Fernando Buesa Arena.
- Araski, women's basketball team playing in the top professional Spanish league Liga Femenina Endesa. Home matches are played in the Polideportivo Mendizorrotza.

Each year the city hosts an Ironman triathlon, 'Ironman Vitoria-Gasteiz'. The 2024 event was an Ironman Pro-Series event in which the Ironman world champion, Sam Laidlow, competed but was disqualified, having failed to serve a drafting penalty. The men's race was won by Antonio Benito Lopez, of Spain. The women's race was won by Kat Matthews, of the UK.

== International relations ==
=== Twin towns – sister cities ===
Vitoria-Gasteiz is twinned with:

- Anaheim, United States
- Angoulême, France
- Asunción, Paraguay
- Cogo, Equatorial Guinea
- La Güera, Western Sahara
- Ibagué, Colombia
- Victoria, United States
- Vitória, Brazil

== Notable people ==
- Ignacio María de Álava (1750–1817), naval officer and explorer, captain general of the Spanish Navy
- Miguel Ricardo de Álava (1770–1843), general and statesman who participated in the battles of Trafalgar and Waterloo
- Igor López de Munain (1983/1984–2022), member of the Basque Parliament
- Isabel de Urquiola (1854–1911), explorer
- Ramiro de Maeztu (1875–1936), political theorist and journalist
- Ignacio Hidalgo de Cisneros (1896–1966), aviator, commander of the Republican air force during the Spanish Civil War
- Txema Blasco (1941–2024), film and television actor
- Lourdes Oñederra (1958), Basque linguist, professor and writer
- Martín Fiz (1963), world marathon champion 1995
- Karmele Jaio (born 1970), writer and journalist
- Iker Jiménez (1973), journalist
- Miren Ortubay Fuentes (born 1958), lawyer, criminologist, professor
- Edu Roldán (1977), retired footballer
- Tania Lamarca (1980), rhythmic gymnast, Olympic champion with the Spanish group at the 1996 Summer Olympics in Atlanta, and two times world champion
- Estíbaliz Martínez (1980), rhythmic gymnast, Olympic champion with the Spanish group at the 1996 Summer Olympics in Atlanta, and two times world champion
- Michael Marder (1980), philosopher
- Almudena Cid (1980), rhythmic gymnast now retired, eight-time national champion; participated in four Olympic finals at Atlanta 1996, Sydney 2000, Athens 2004 and Beijing 2008, also took part in 9 world championships and 12 European championships
- Lorena Guréndez (1981), rhythmic gymnast, Olympic champion with the Spanish group at the 1996 Summer Olympics in Atlanta, and two times world champion.
- Unai Simón (1997), footballer who plays as a goalkeeper for La Liga club Athletic Bilbao and the Spain national team.

== See also ==
- List of municipalities in Álava
