= Monasterioguren =

Hamlet in Álava, Spain

- Concejo
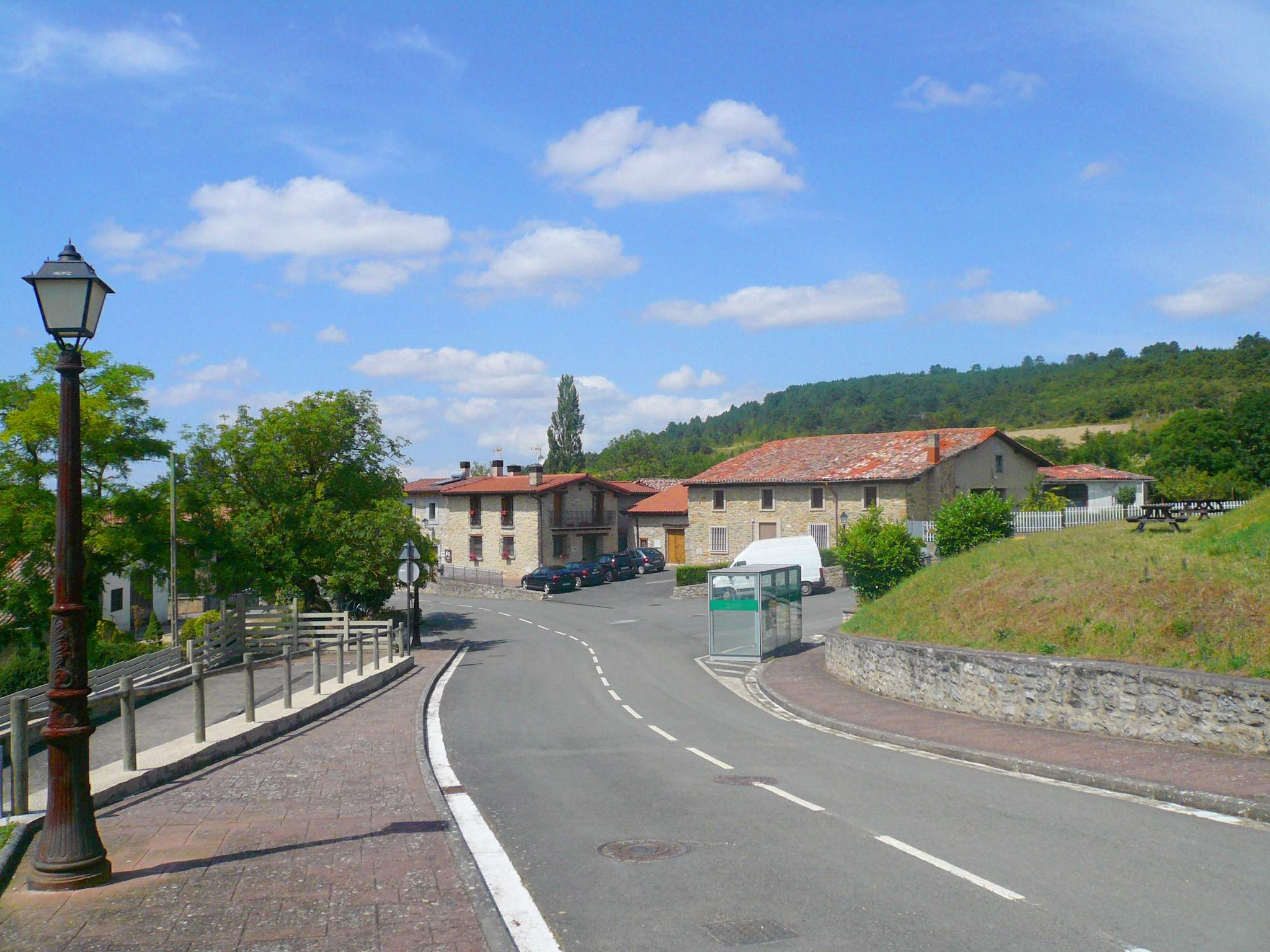

- Coat of arms

- Location within Álava Location within the Basque Country Location within Spain
- Coordinates: 42.8039°N 2.6431°W
- Country: Spain
- Autonomous community: Basque Country
- Province: Álava
- Comarca: Vitoria-Gasteiz
- Municipality: Vitoria-Gasteiz

Area
  - Total: 5.4 km^{2} (2.1 sq mi)
- Elevation: 590 m (1,940 ft)

Population (2022)
  - Total: 44
  - Density: 8.1/km^{2} (21/sq mi)
- Postal code: 01194

Monasterioguren is a hamlet and concejo located in the municipality of Vitoria-Gasteiz, in Álava province, Basque Country, Spain.
