= Hueto Abajo =

Hamlet in Álava, Spain

Hueto Abajo/Otobarren
- Concejo
- Coat of arms

- Location within Álava Location within the Basque Country Location within Spain
- Coordinates: 42°53′07″N 2°48′05″W
- Country: Spain
- Autonomous community: Basque Country
- Province: Álava
- Comarca: Vitoria-Gasteiz
- Municipality: Vitoria-Gasteiz

Area
  - Total: 8.74 km^{2} (3.37 sq mi)
- Elevation: 527 m (1,729 ft)

Population (2022)
  - Total: 43
  - Density: 4.9/km^{2} (13/sq mi)
- Postal code: 01191

Hueto Abajo (Spanish pronunciation: [ˈweto aˈβaxo]) or Otobarren (Basque pronunciation: [otoβaren]) is a hamlet and concejo located in the municipality of Vitoria-Gasteiz, in Álava province, Basque Country, Spain.
