= Aranbizkarra =

Neighborhood in Vitoria-Gasteiz, Spain

- Neighborhood
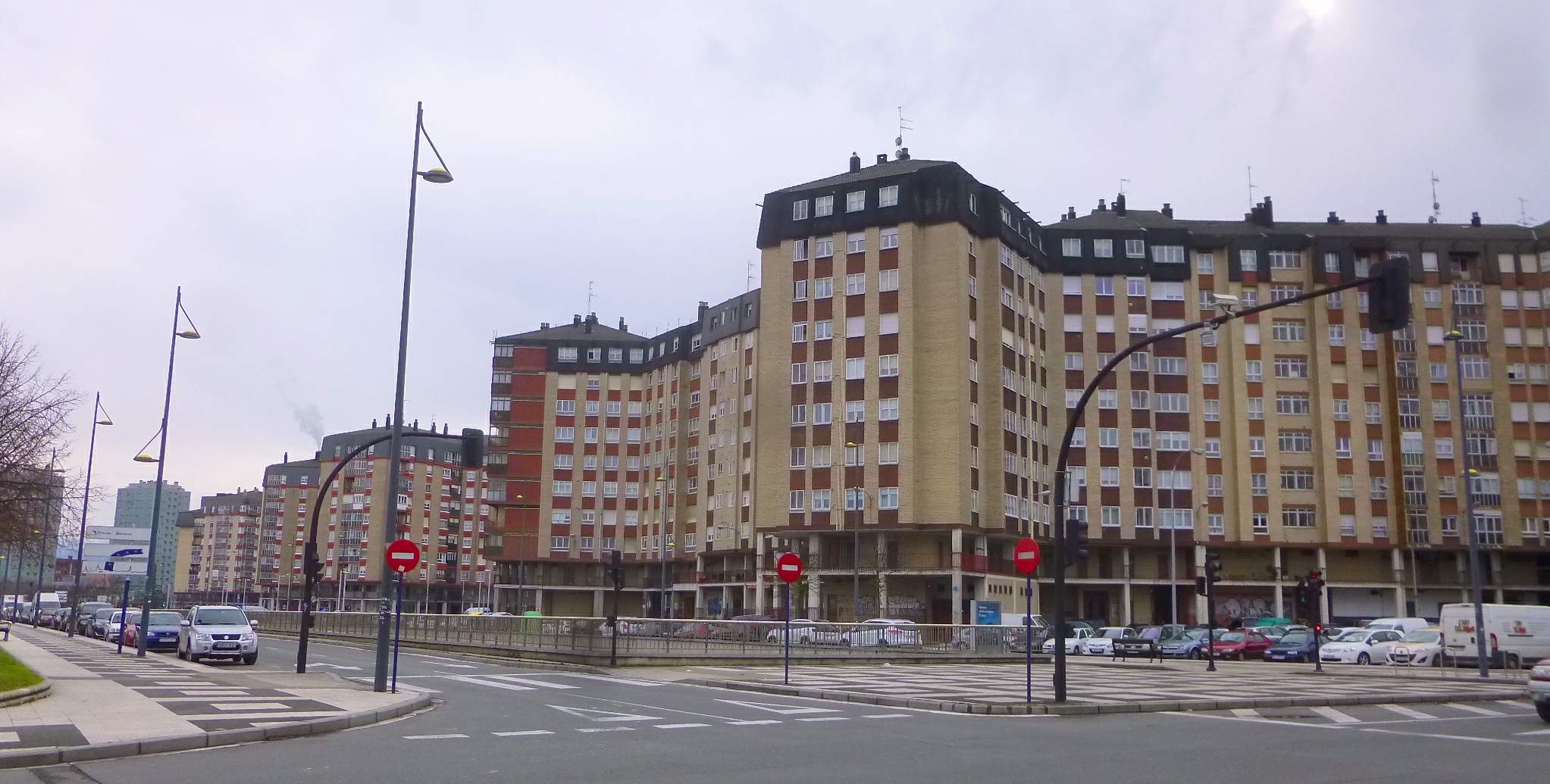
- Residential buildings in Aranbizkarra
- Interactive map of Aranbizkarra
- Coordinates: 42°51′17″N 2°39′41″W
- Country: Spain
- Autonomous community: Basque Country
- Province: Álava
- Comarca: Vitoria-Gasteiz
- Municipality: Vitoria-Gasteiz

Area
  - Total: 0.43 km^{2} (0.17 sq mi)

Population (2022)
  - Total: 10,492
- Postal code: 01002

Aranbizkarra is a neighborhood in the northeast of Vitoria-Gasteiz, Basque Country, Spain. It was built during the 1970s in one of the few areas within the former ring road which remained undeveloped at the time.
