= Zumeltzu =

Hamlet in Álava, Spain

- Concejo
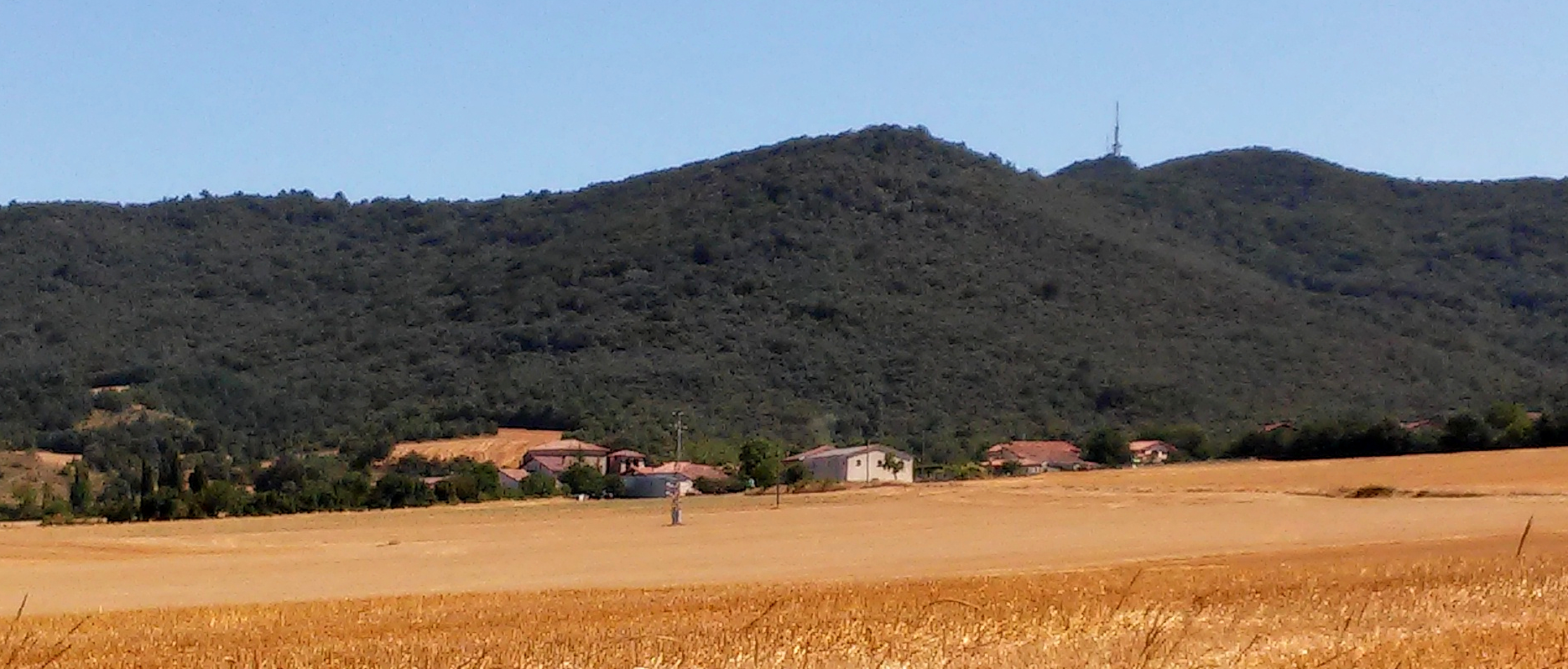
- View of Zumeltzu with Zaldiaran in the background

- Location within Álava Location within the Basque Country Location within Spain
- Coordinates: 42°48′26″N 2°45′19″W
- Country: Spain
- Autonomous community: Basque Country
- Province: Álava
- Comarca: Vitoria-Gasteiz
- Municipality: Vitoria-Gasteiz

Area
  - Total: 4.15 km^{2} (1.60 sq mi)
- Elevation: 621 m (2,037 ft)

Population (2022)
  - Total: 50
- Postal code: 01195

Zumeltzu (Basque pronunciation: [s̻umelts̻u], Spanish: Zumelzu [θuˈmelθu]) is a hamlet and concejo located in the municipality of Vitoria-Gasteiz, in Álava province, Basque Country, Spain.
