= Esquivel (disambiguation) =

Esquivel is a surname of Basque origin. Esquivel may also refer to:

== Locations ==
- Esquíbel or Esquivel (officially Eskibel) a Basque town located in Vitoria-Gasteiz, Spain
- Port Esquivel, Jamaica
- Caye Esquivel, Cuban caye
- Esquivel, Alcalá del Río, a town located in the municipality of Alcalá del Río, Sevilla, Spain
- Apo Esquivel Pob., a town located in Jaen, Nueva Ecija, Philippines
- Essequibo (colony), a Dutch colony on the Essequibo River (named after Juan de Esquivel) in the Guiana region from 1616 to 1814

=== Buildings and monuments ===
- Eskibel Castle, a castle located in Vitoria-Gasteiz, Spain
- Palacio Escoriaza-Esquivel, a palace located in Vitoria-Gasteiz, Spain
- Casa de Esquivel y Jaraba, Peruvian royal house
- Corral de Esquivel, 19th-century building located in Sevilla, Spain

=== Physical locations ===
- Cerro Esquivel, a mountain located near Acarí, Peru
- Essequibo River, the largest river in Guyana, named after Juan de Esquivel

== People ==
- Juan García Esquivel, Mexican composer of space age pop, used sole name Esquivel
- Luc Esquivel, American transgender golfer
