= Zaldiaran =

Mountain in Álava, Spain

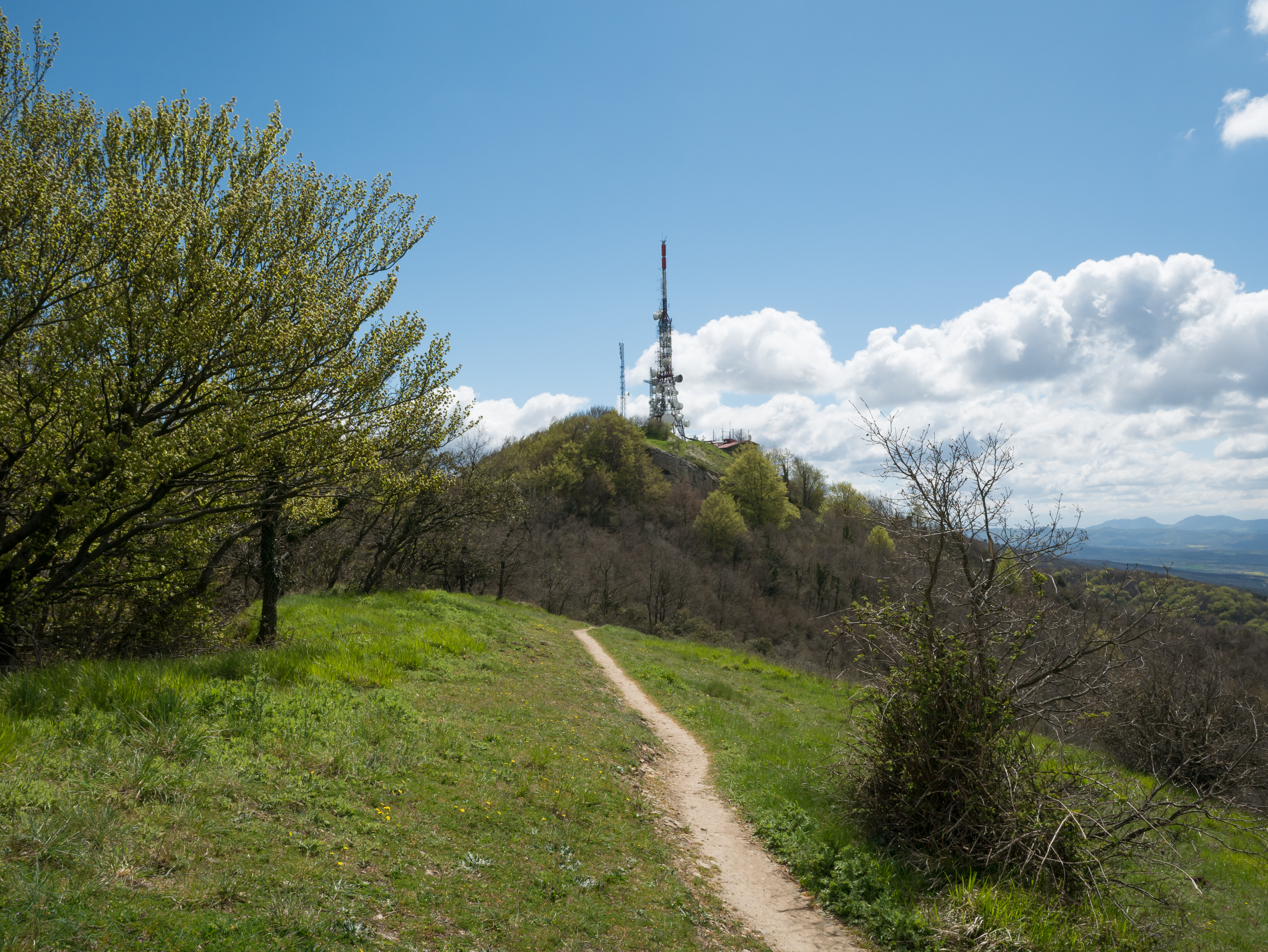
- Summit of Zaldiaran

Highest point
- Elevation: 978 m (3,209 ft)
- Prominence: 175 m (574 ft)
- Coordinates: 42°47′45″N 2°44′07″W

Geography
- Location: Álava, Basque Country, Spain
- Parent range: Montes de Vitoria

Climbing
- Easiest route: Hike

Zaldiaran (Spanish pronunciation: [θalˈdjaɾan], Basque pronunciation: [s̻aldi.aɾan]) is a mountain in the Montes de Vitoria range, in the province of Álava, Basque Country, Spain. Even if part of the south face of the mountain is on the Treviño exclave, Burgos; the summit itself lies in Álava. At the top of the mountain, apart from a tall metallic cross that was placed in 1950 by the Manuel Iradier hiking club, there are a few big aerials that transmit television and radio signal to Vitoria-Gasteiz.

Close to the summit lies the Zaldiaran pass, with a height of 780 metres (2,560 ft), it links Álava with the Treviño exclave. The roads that communicate the two provinces are the A-3102 in Álava and the BU-742 in Treviño. The northern slopes are covered by beeches (Fagus sylvatica) that give way to Portuguese oak (Quercus faginea) woods on the lower parts.

Due to the proximity of the summit to Vitoria-Gasteiz and its easy access, it is popular among hikers. On New Year's Day, the hiking clubs of the city organize hikes to the mountain to celebrate the new year.

== Access points and trails ==
The most popular trail starts in Berrostegieta, on the road that leads to the Zaldiaran pass. This route goes through the secondary Errogana summit. Another popular starting point is the nearby hamlet of Eskibel. The shortest route starts at the Zaldiaran pass, and follows the paved track that leads to the summit.
