= Karkamu =

Hamlet in Álava, Spain

- Concejo
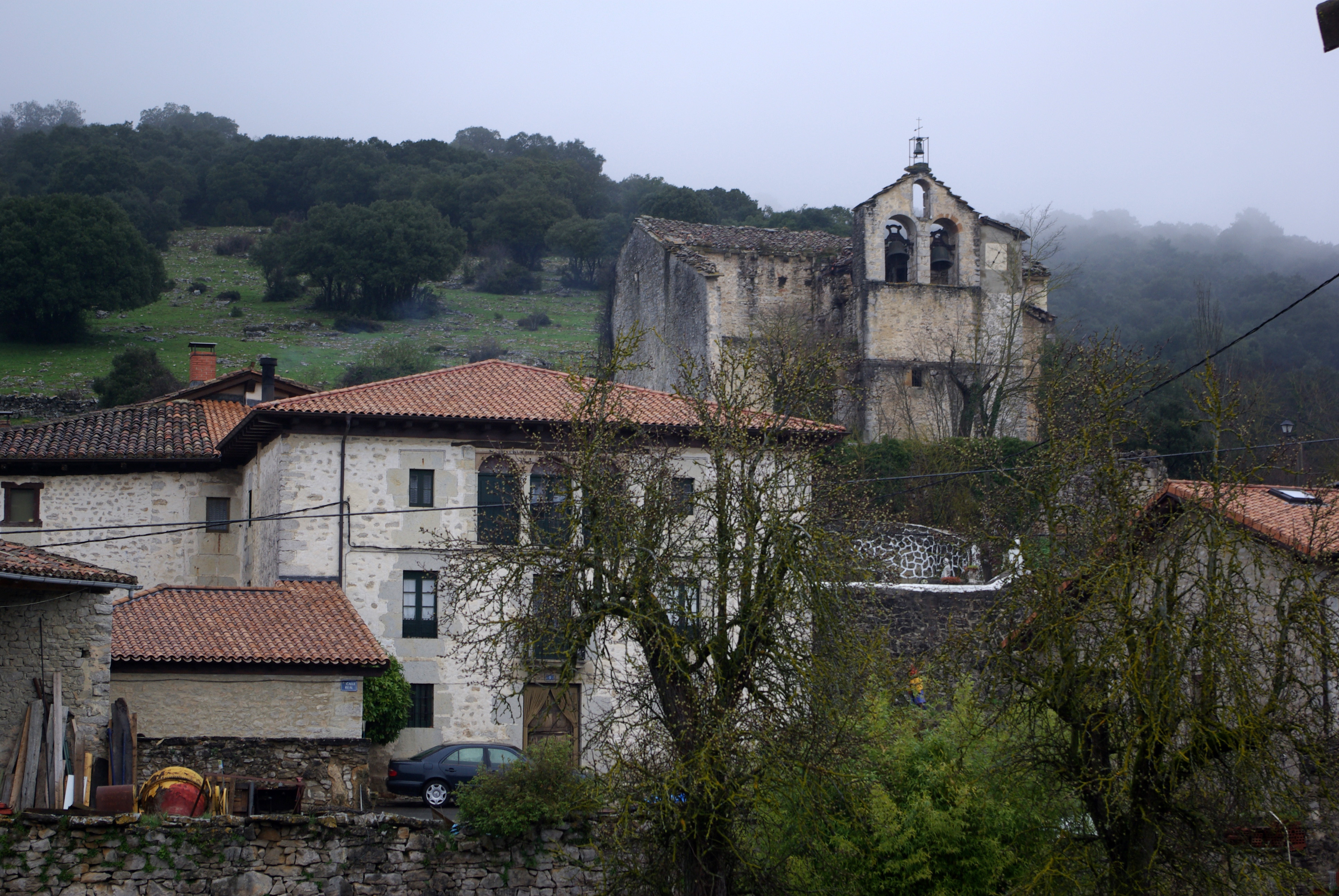
- View of Cárcamo with its parish church visible

- Location within Álava Location within the Basque Country Location within Spain
- Coordinates: 42°51′39″N 3°02′21″W
- Country: Spain
- Autonomous community: Basque Country
- Province: Álava
- Comarca: Añana
- Municipality: Valdegovía/Gaubea

Area
  - Total: 9.75 km^{2} (3.76 sq mi)
- Elevation: 654 m (2,146 ft)

Population (2023)
  - Total: 29
  - Density: 3.0/km^{2} (7.7/sq mi)
- Postal code: 01426

Karkamu (Spanish: Cárcamo) is a hamlet and concejo in the municipality of Valdegovía/Gaubea, in Álava province, Basque Country, Spain.
