= Ausma =

Ausma may refer to:

- Ausma (given name), a Latvian given name
- Dawn (2015 film), a Latvian film, released as Ausma in Latvia
- Ausma, a former association football club in the Latvian SSR Higher League; see 1968 Latvian SSR Higher League for example
- KA-07 Ausma, a Latvian Naval Forces coastal patrol boat which entered service in 1994
- SS Ausma, a cargo ship sunk in World War II; see List of shipwrecks in August 1941

== See also ==
- Osma (disambiguation)
- Ozma (disambiguation)
