= Quintanilla, Álava =

Hamlet in Álava, Spain

Quintanilla
- Concejo
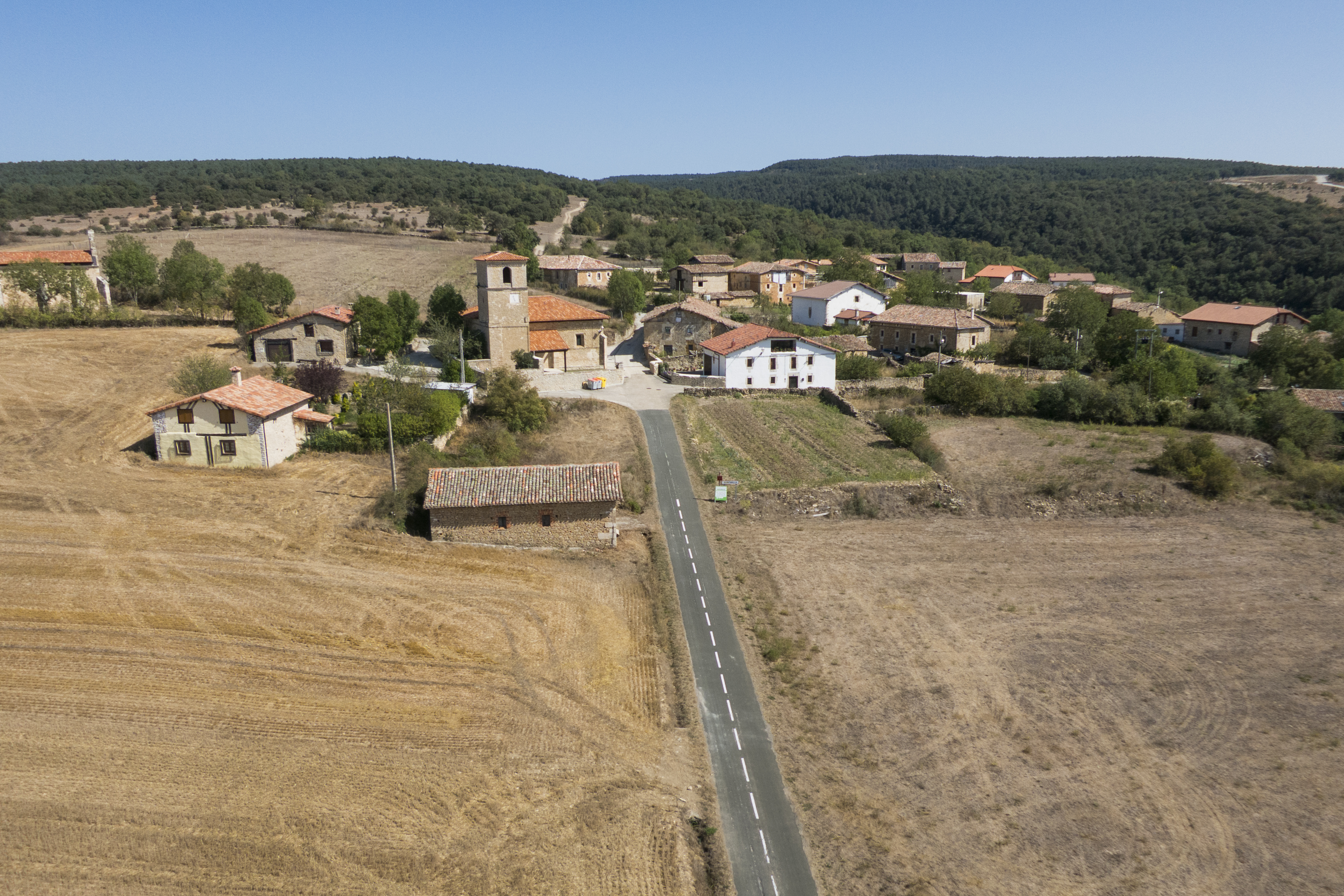
- Aerial view of Quintanilla

- Location within Álava Location within the Basque Country Location within Spain
- Coordinates: 42.91194°N 3.18667°W
- Country: Spain
- Autonomous community: Basque Country
- Province: Álava
- Comarca: Añana
- Municipality: Valdegovía/Gaubea

Area
  - Total: 6.5 km^{2} (2.5 sq mi)
- Elevation: 737 m (2,418 ft)

Population (2022)
  - Total: 12
  - Density: 1.8/km^{2} (4.8/sq mi)
- Postal code: 01427

Quintanilla is a hamlet and concejo located in the municipality of Valdegovía/Gaubea, in Álava province, Basque Country, Spain.
