= Tuesta, Álava =

Hamlet in Álava, Spain

Tuesta
- Concejo
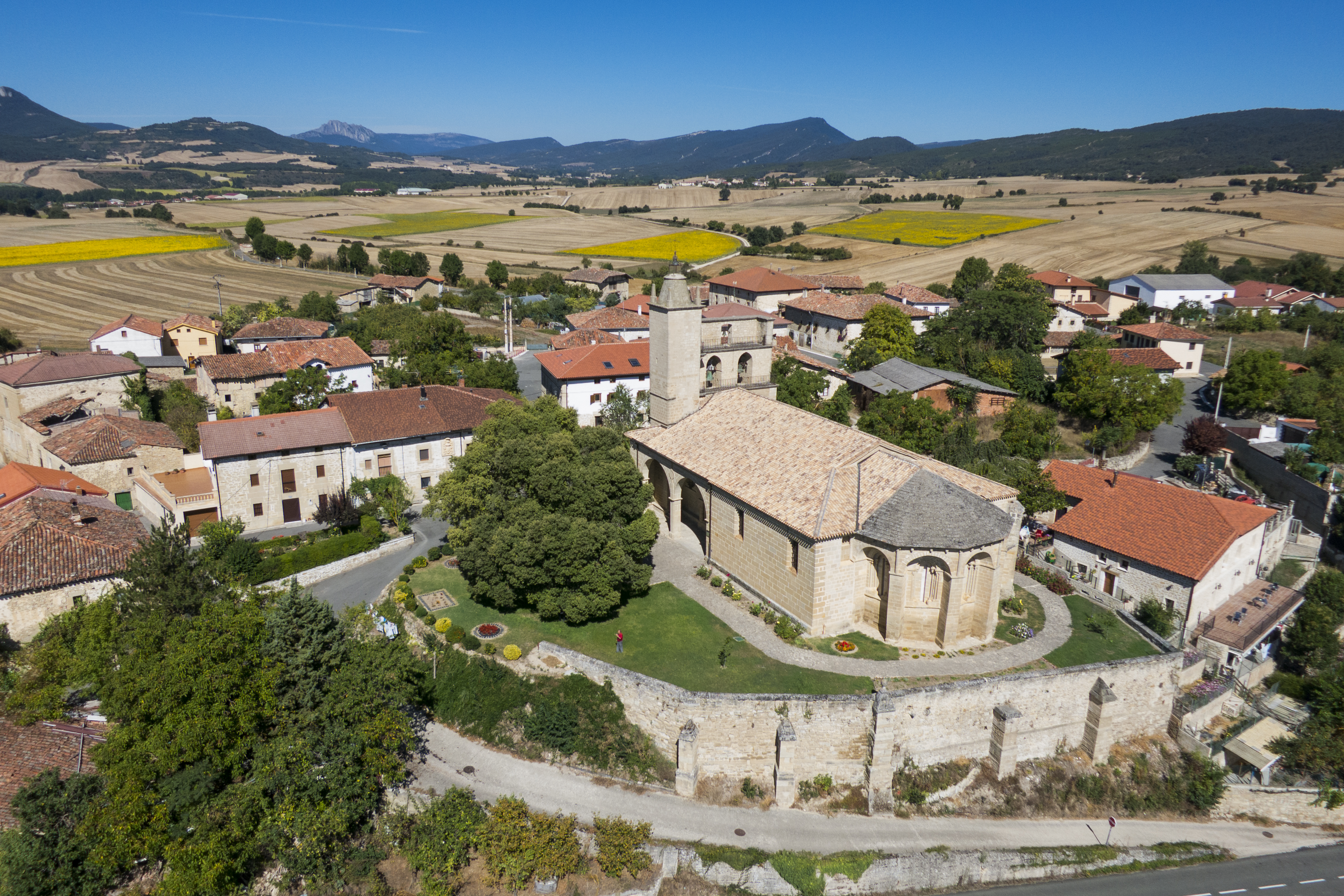
- Aerial view of Tuesta

- Location within Álava Location within the Basque Country Location within Spain
- Coordinates: 42°48′35″N 3°01′29″W
- Country: Spain
- Autonomous community: Basque Country
- Province: Álava
- Comarca: Añana
- Municipality: Valdegovía/Gaubea

Area
  - Total: 5.69 km^{2} (2.20 sq mi)
- Elevation: 549 m (1,801 ft)

Population (2023)
  - Total: 82
  - Density: 14/km^{2} (37/sq mi)
- Postal code: 01423

Tuesta is a hamlet and concejo in the municipality of Valdegovía/Gaubea, in Álava province, Basque Country, Spain. Its parish church is one of the most notable Romanesque buildings in the province.
