= Bóveda, Álava =

Hamlet in Álava, Spain

Bóveda
- Concejo
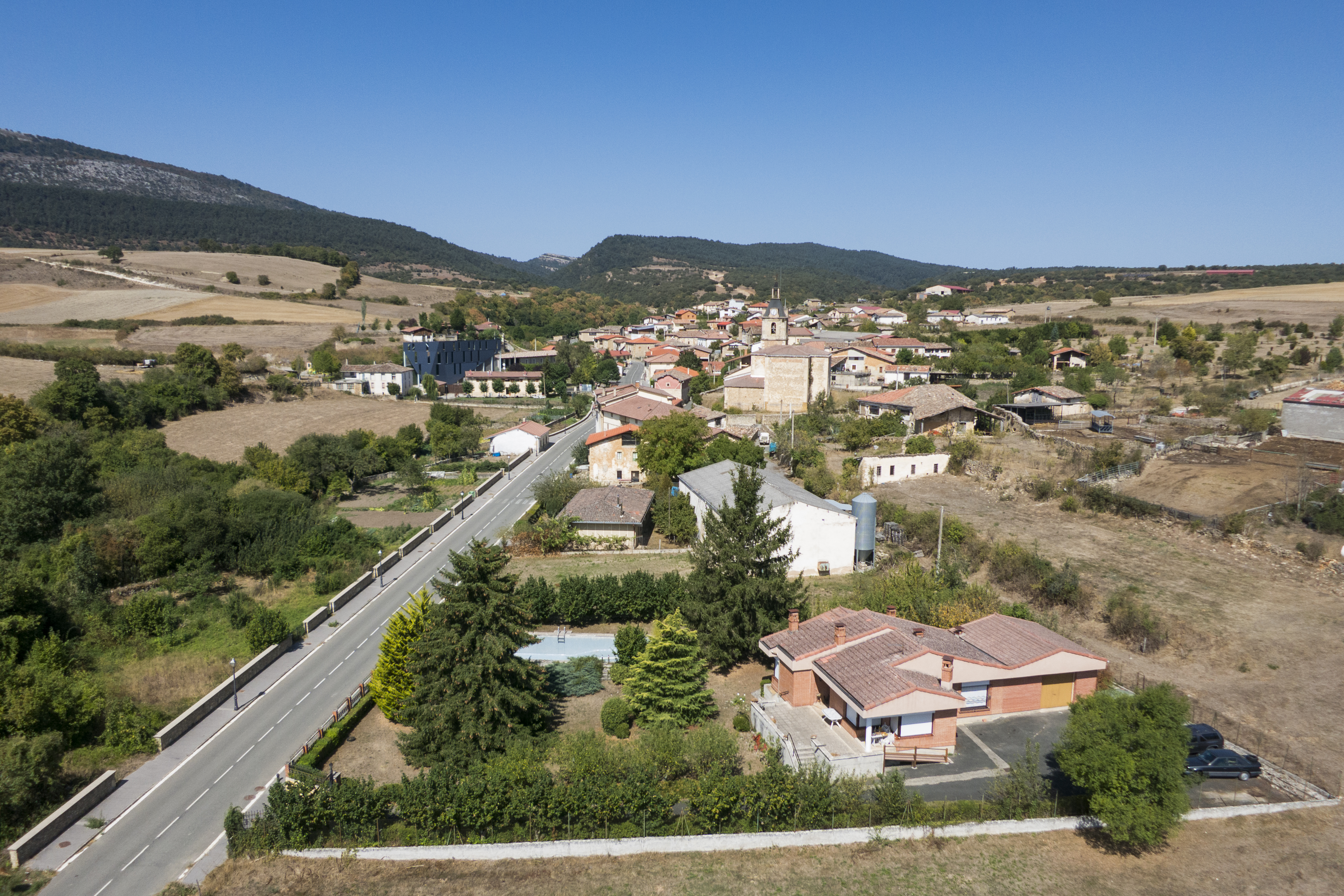

- Location within Álava Location within the Basque Country Location within Spain
- Coordinates: 42°54′24″N 3°12′17″W
- Country: Spain
- Autonomous community: Basque Country
- Province: Álava
- Comarca: Añana
- Municipality: Valdegovía/Gaubea

Area
  - Total: 28.59 km^{2} (11.04 sq mi)
- Elevation: 691 m (2,267 ft)

Population (2023)
  - Total: 59
  - Density: 2.1/km^{2} (5.3/sq mi)
- Postal code: 01427

Bóveda is a hamlet and concejo in the municipality of Valdegovía/Gaubea, in Álava province, Basque Country, Spain.
