= Basabe =

Hamlet in Álava, Spain

- Concejo
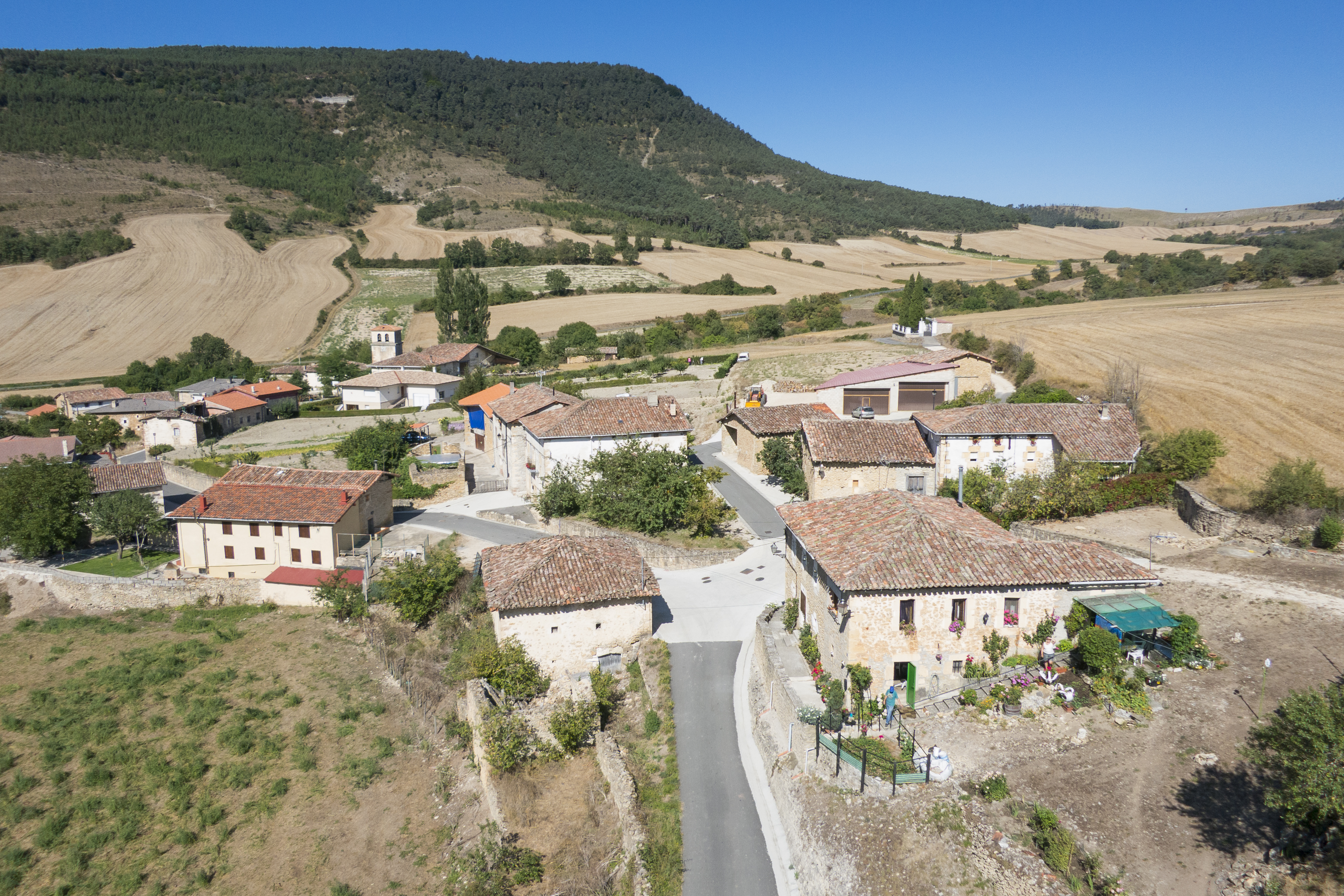

- Location within Álava Location within the Basque Country Location within Spain
- Coordinates: 42°53′36″N 3°08′38″W
- Country: Spain
- Autonomous community: Basque Country
- Province: Álava
- Comarca: Añana
- Municipality: Valdegovía/Gaubea

Area
  - Total: 4.33 km^{2} (1.67 sq mi)
- Elevation: 690 m (2,260 ft)

Population (2023)
  - Total: 16
  - Density: 3.7/km^{2} (9.6/sq mi)
- Postal code: 01427

Basabe is a hamlet and concejo in the municipality of Valdegovía/Gaubea, in Álava province, Basque Country, Spain.
