= Acebedo, Álava =

Hamlet in Álava, Spain

Acebedo
- Concejo
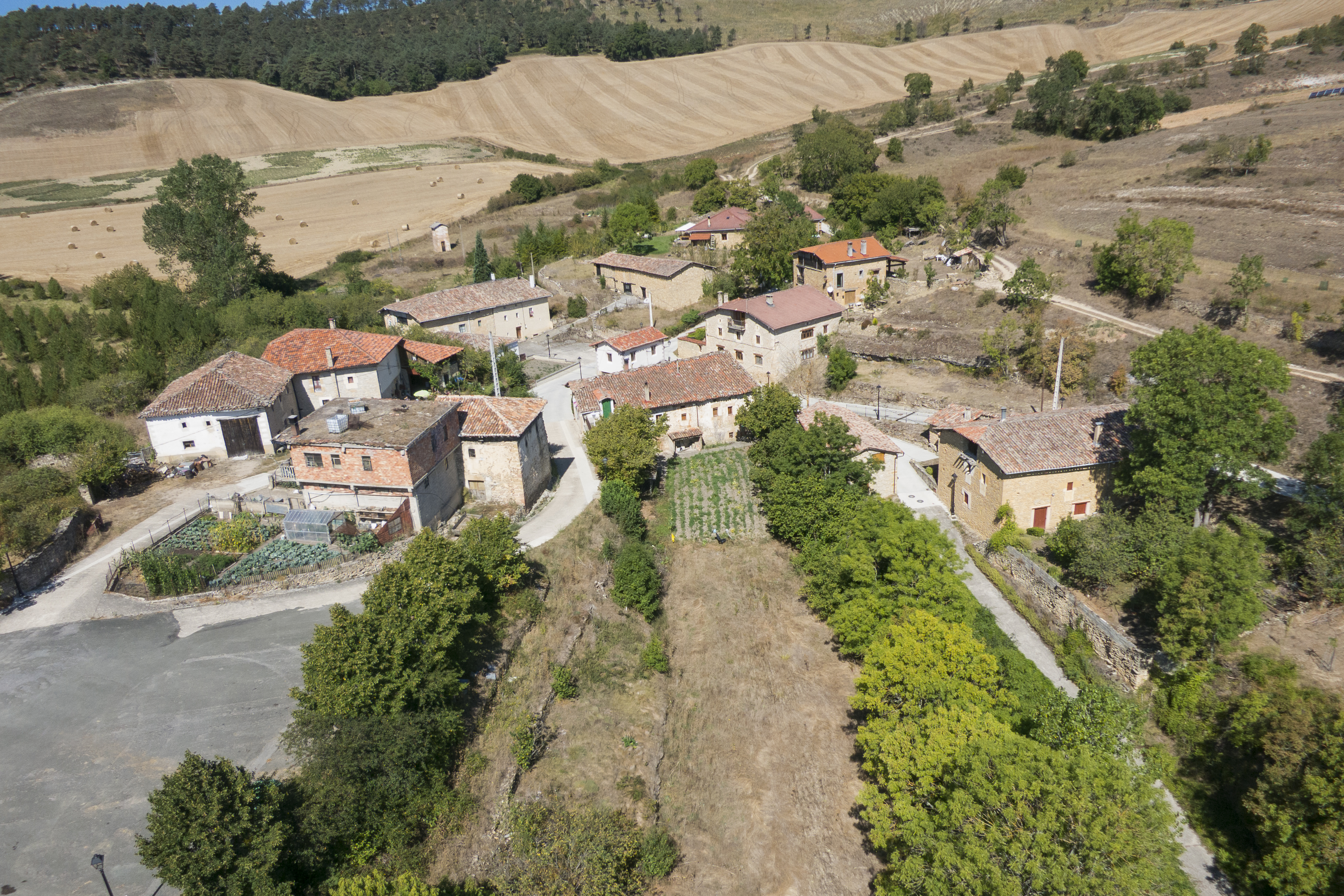

- Location within Álava Location within the Basque Country Location within Spain
- Coordinates: 42.9042°N 3.1544°W
- Country: Spain
- Autonomous community: Basque Country
- Province: Álava
- Comarca: Añana
- Municipality: Valdegovía/Gaubea

Area
  - Total: 4.00 km^{2} (1.54 sq mi)
- Elevation: 740 m (2,430 ft)

Population (2023)
  - Total: 4
  - Density: 1.0/km^{2} (2.6/sq mi)
- Postal code: 01427

Acebedo is a hamlet and concejo in the municipality of Valdegovía/Gaubea, in Álava province, Basque Country, Spain.
