= Valderejo =

Hamlet in Álava, Spain

- Concejo
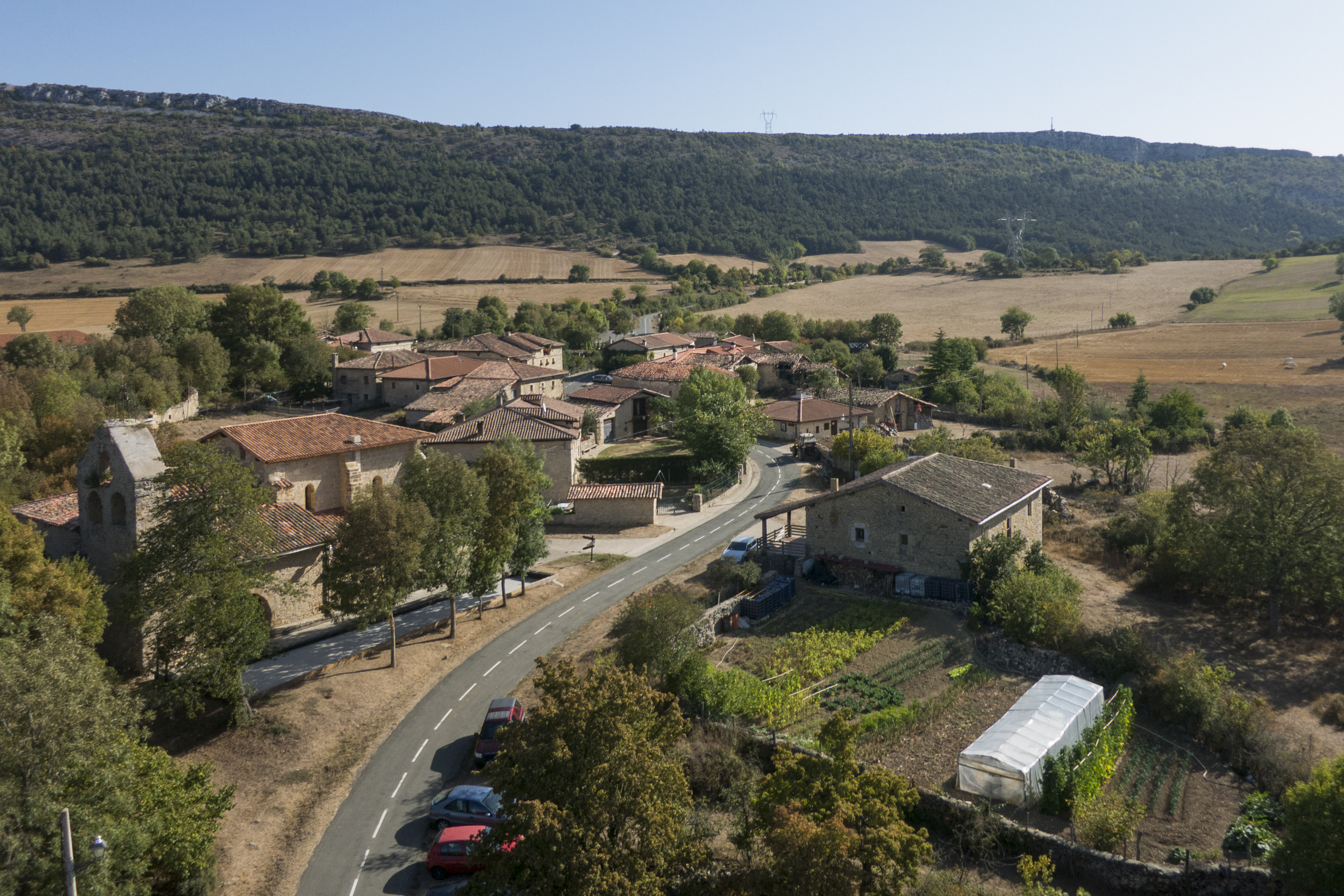
- Lalastra in Valderejo

- Location within Álava Location within the Basque Country Location within Spain
- Coordinates: 42°52′22″N 3°14′03″W
- Country: Spain
- Autonomous community: Basque Country
- Province: Álava
- Comarca: Añana
- Municipality: Valdegovía/Gaubea

Area
  - Total: 35.75 km^{2} (13.80 sq mi)

Population (2023)
  - Total: 12
  - Density: 0.34/km^{2} (0.87/sq mi)
- Postal code: 01427

Valderejo is a concejo in the municipality of Valdegovía/Gaubea, in Álava province, Basque Country, Spain. It contains the hamlets of Lalastra (the capital of the concejo) and Lahoz, as well as the depopulated settlements of Villamardones and Ribera. It is conterminous with the Valderejo Natural Park. It was an independent municipality until 1966, when it was absorbed by Valdegovía.
