= Bellojín =

Hamlet in Álava, Spain

- Hamlet
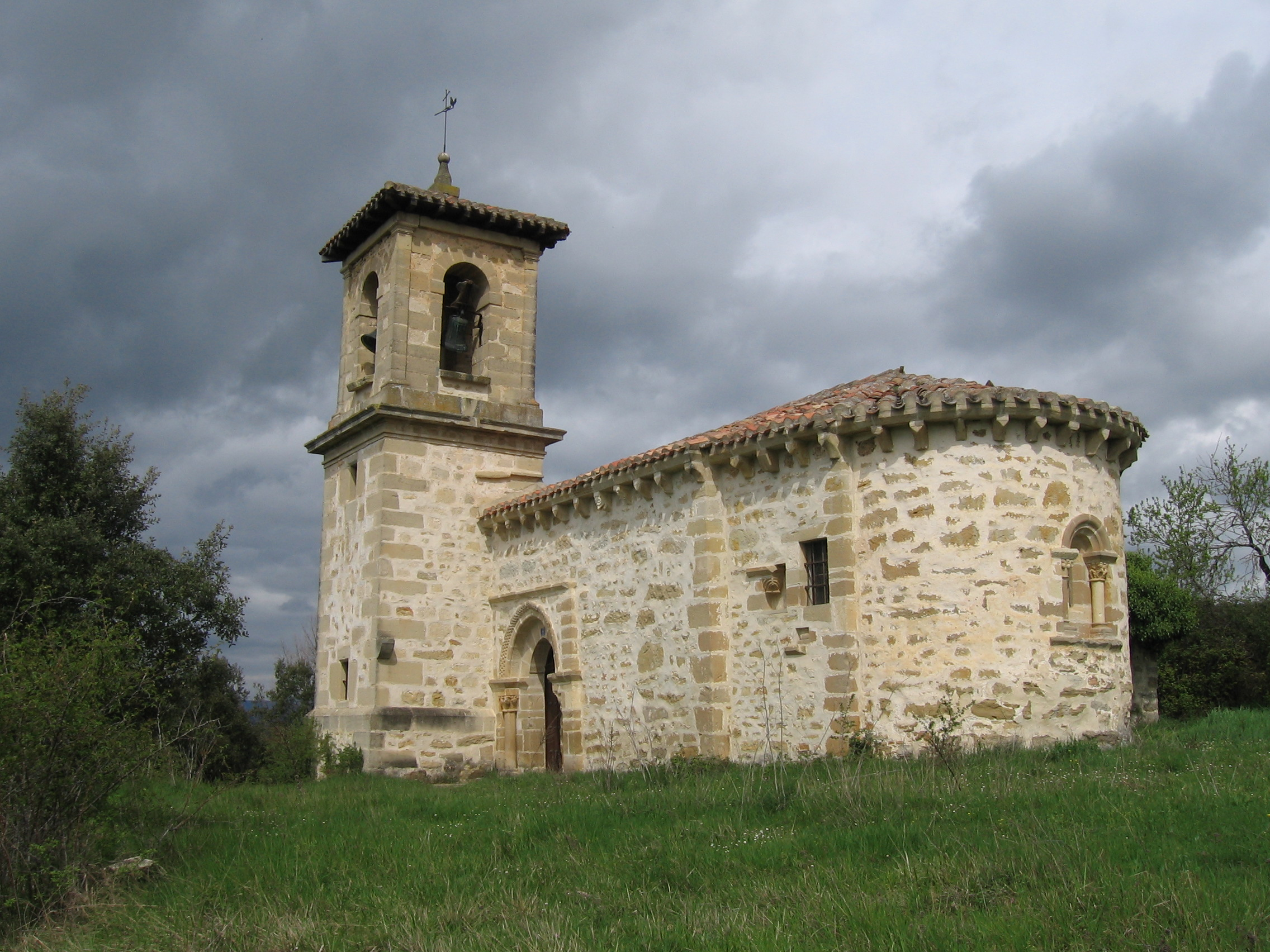
- The church of Bellojín

- Location within Álava Location within the Basque Country Location within Spain
- Coordinates: 42°49′43″N 3°01′42″W
- Country: Spain
- Autonomous community: Basque Country
- Province: Álava
- Comarca: Añana
- Municipality: Valdegovía/Gaubea
- Concejo: Villamaderne
- Elevation: 627 m (2,057 ft)

Population (2023)
  - Total: 7
- Postal code: 01423

Bellojín is a hamlet in the municipality of Valdegovía/Gaubea, in Álava province, Basque Country, Spain. It is part of the concejo of Villamaderne.
