= Nograro =

Hamlet in Álava, Spain

- Concejo
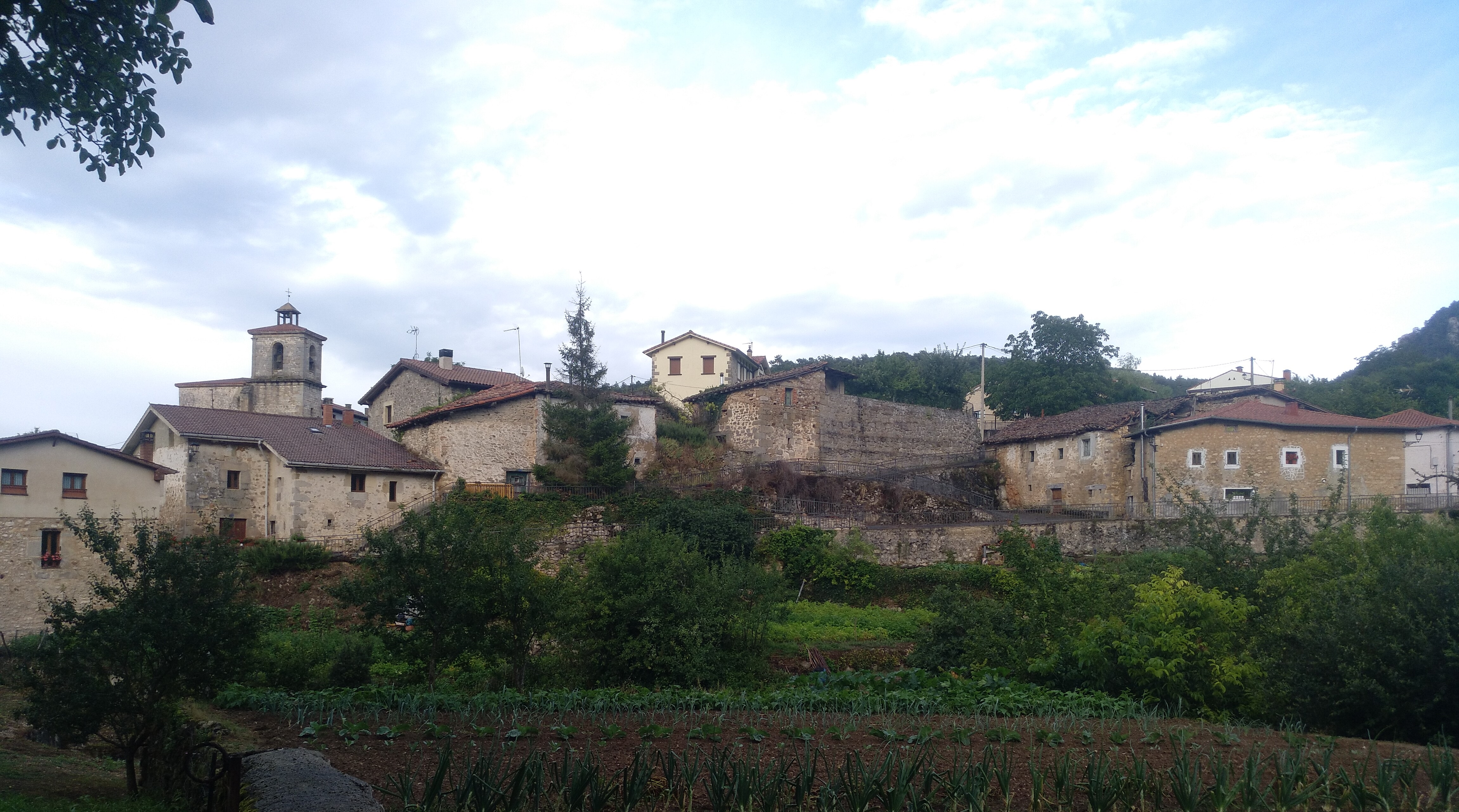
- View of Nograro

- Location within Álava Location within the Basque Country Location within Spain
- Coordinates: 42.82°N 3.12°W
- Country: Spain
- Autonomous community: Basque Country
- Province: Álava
- Comarca: Añana
- Municipality: Valdegovía/Gaubea

Area
  - Total: 5.45 km^{2} (2.10 sq mi)
- Elevation: 664 m (2,178 ft)

Population (2023)
  - Total: 13
  - Density: 2.4/km^{2} (6.2/sq mi)
- Postal code: 01426

Nograro is a hamlet and concejo located in the municipality of Valdegovía/Gaubea, in Álava province, Basque Country, Spain.
