= Bachicabo =

Hamlet in Álava, Spain

- Concejo
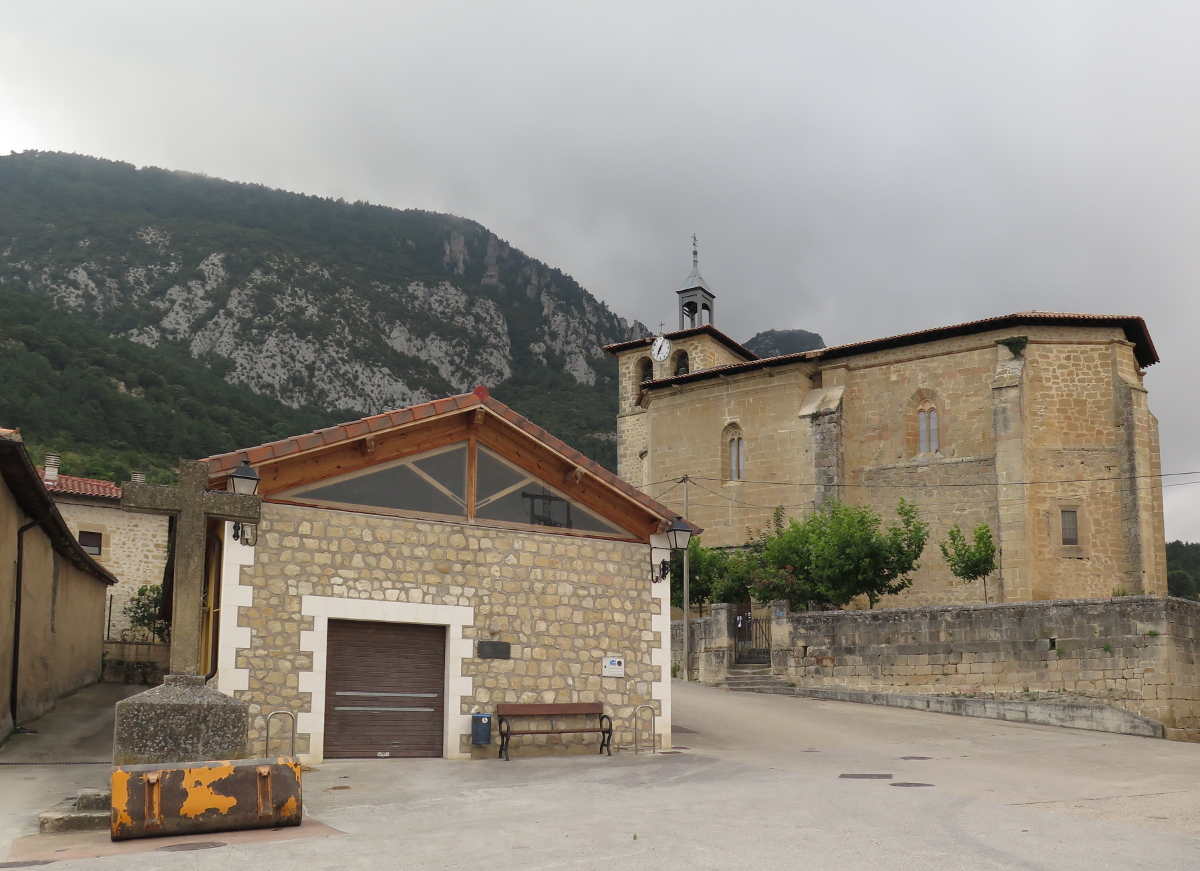
- View of Bachicabo

- Location within Álava Location within the Basque Country Location within Spain
- Coordinates: 42.78964°N 3.07067°W
- Country: Spain
- Autonomous community: Basque Country
- Province: Álava
- Comarca: Añana
- Municipality: Valdegovía/Gaubea

Area
  - Total: 13.01 km^{2} (5.02 sq mi)
- Elevation: 653 m (2,142 ft)

Population (2023)
  - Total: 29
  - Density: 2.2/km^{2} (5.8/sq mi)
- Postal code: 01423

Bachicabo is a hamlet and concejo in the municipality of Valdegovía/Gaubea, in Álava province, Basque Country, Spain.
