= Fresneda =

Hamlet in Álava, Spain

- Concejo
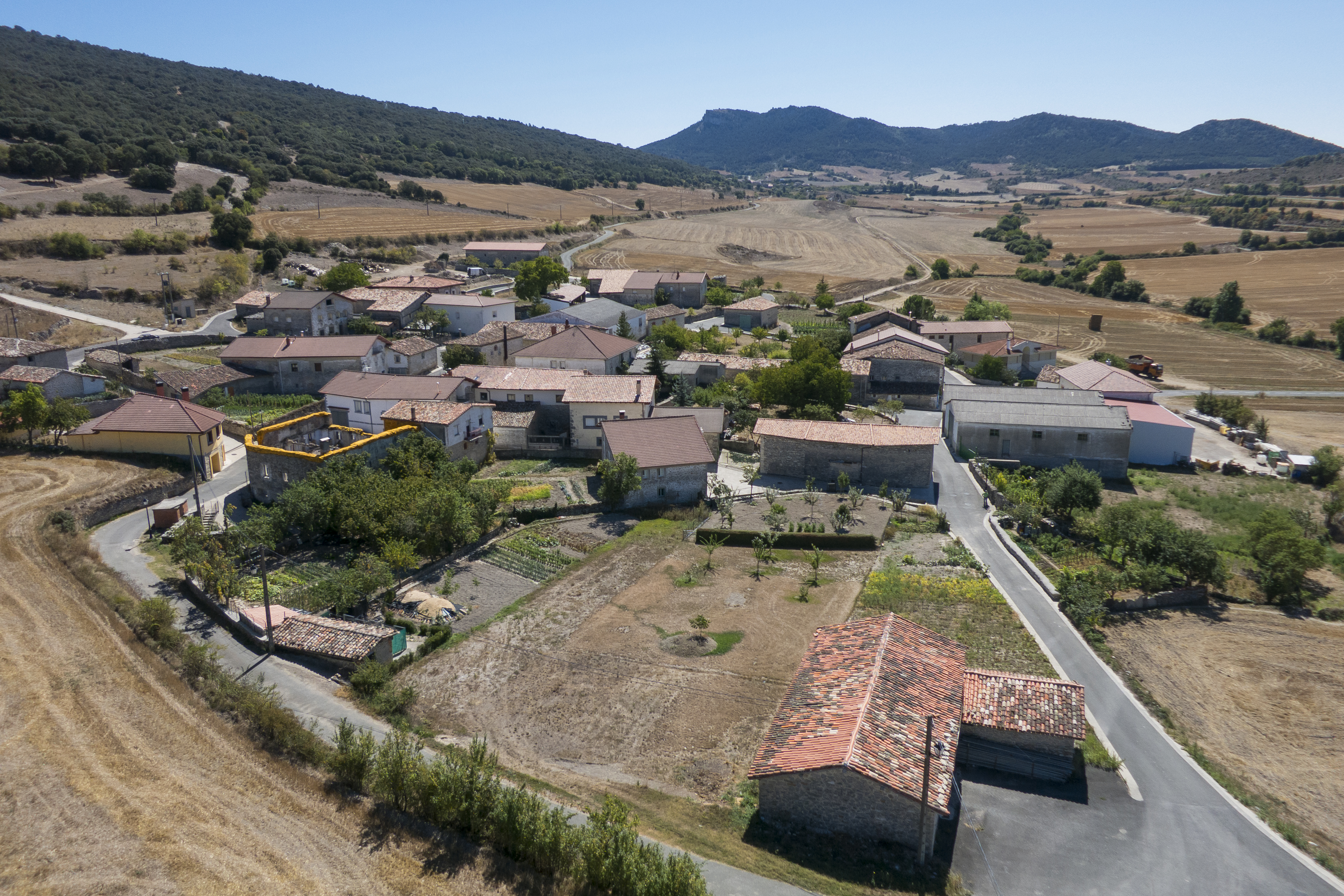

- Location within Álava Location within the Basque Country Location within Spain
- Coordinates: 42.8756°N 3.055°W
- Country: Spain
- Autonomous community: Basque Country
- Province: Álava
- Comarca: Añana
- Municipality: Valdegovía/Gaubea

Area
  - Total: 7.24 km^{2} (2.80 sq mi)
- Elevation: 601 m (1,972 ft)

Population (2022)
  - Total: 17
  - Density: 2.3/km^{2} (6.1/sq mi)
- Postal code: 01426

Fresneda (Spanish pronunciation: [fɾesˈneða]) is a hamlet and concejo located in the municipality of Valdegovía/Gaubea, in Álava province, Basque Country, Spain.
