= Espejo, Álava =

Village in Álava, Spain

Espejo
- Concejo
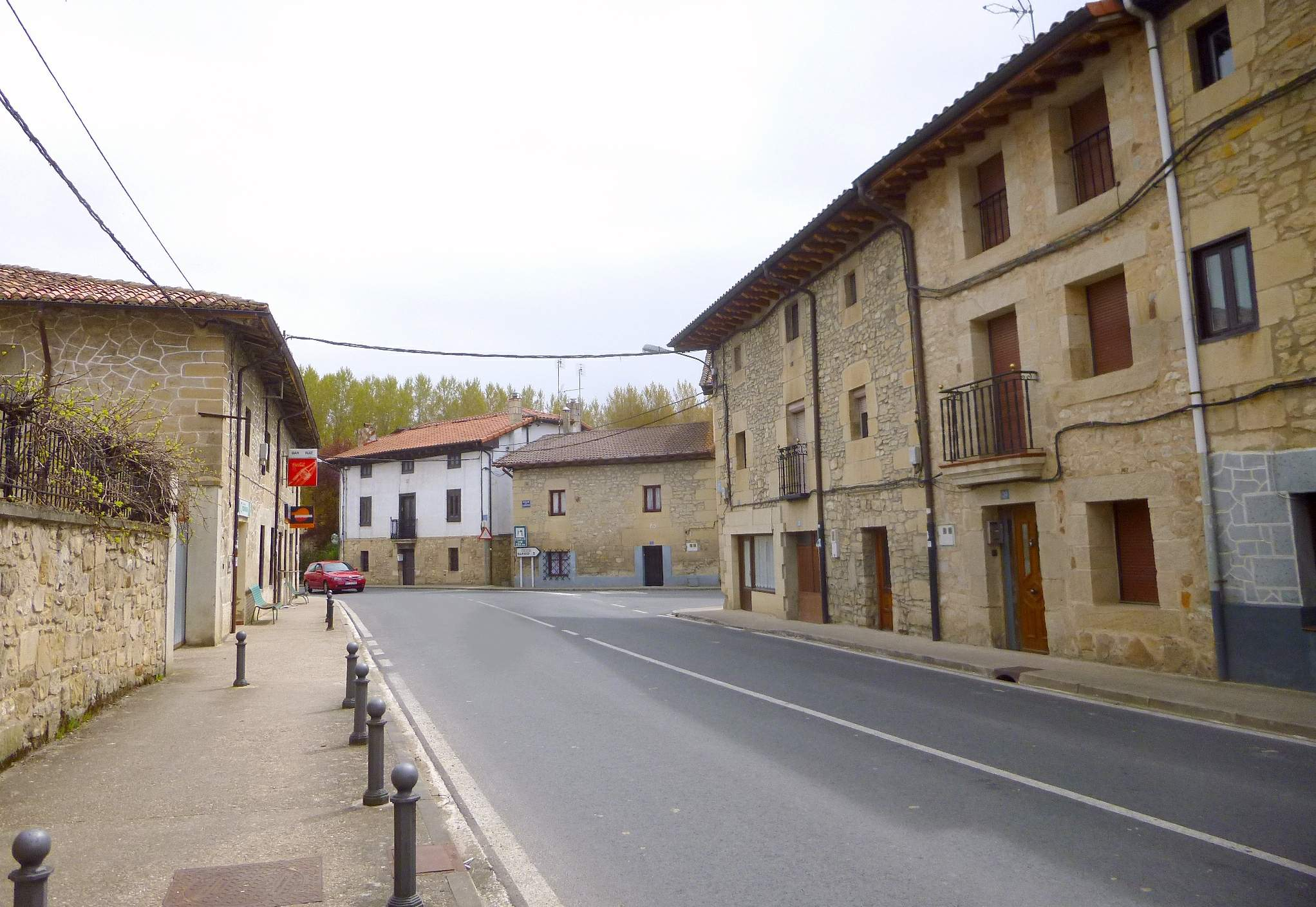

- Location within Álava Location within the Basque Country Location within Spain
- Coordinates: 42°48′31″N 3°02′48″W
- Country: Spain
- Autonomous community: Basque Country
- Province: Álava
- Comarca: Añana
- Municipality: Valdegovía/Gaubea

Area
  - Total: 4.57 km^{2} (1.76 sq mi)
- Elevation: 500 m (1,600 ft)

Population (2022)
  - Total: 278
  - Density: 60.8/km^{2} (158/sq mi)
- Postal code: 01423

Espejo is a village and concejo located in the municipality of Valdegovía/Gaubea, in Álava province, Basque Country, Spain. It is the most populated settlement in the municipality.
