= Ribera, Álava =

Abandoned village in the province of Álava, Spain

Ribera
- Village
- Location within Álava Location within the Basque Country Location within Spain
- Coordinates: 42°50′57″N 3°13′46″W
- Country: Spain
- Autonomous Community: Basque Country
- Province: Álava
- Municipality: Valdegovía
- Concejo: Valderejo

Population (1981)
  - Total: 0

Ribera is a deserted village in the municipality of Valdegovía in Álava, Basque Country, Spain.

In 1802, there were 23 families living in the village. By 1960 there were 9 households remaining, which declined further in 1970 to 5 households. In the 1978 census the village reported no households present, and by the 1981 census the village had been officially depopulated.

The local church, Iglesia de San Estaban de Ribera, has Romanesque architecture and has preserved artwork and features from both the 9th century (mural paintings), and the 13th –16th century also. In 1800 it was part of the Diocese of Burgos.

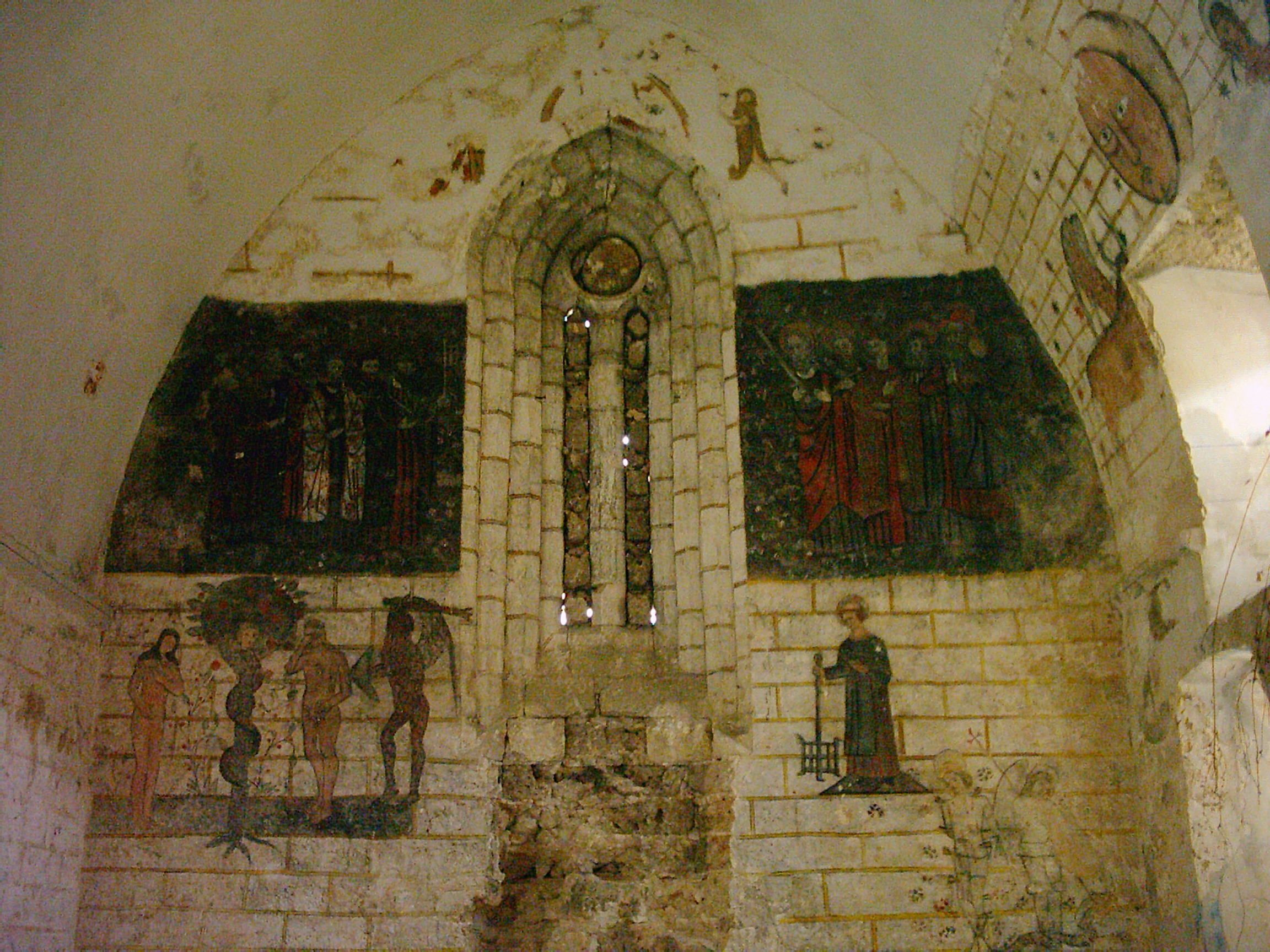
Mural paintings in Iglesia de San Estaban de Ribera.
