= Valluerca =

Hamlet in Álava, Spain

- Concejo
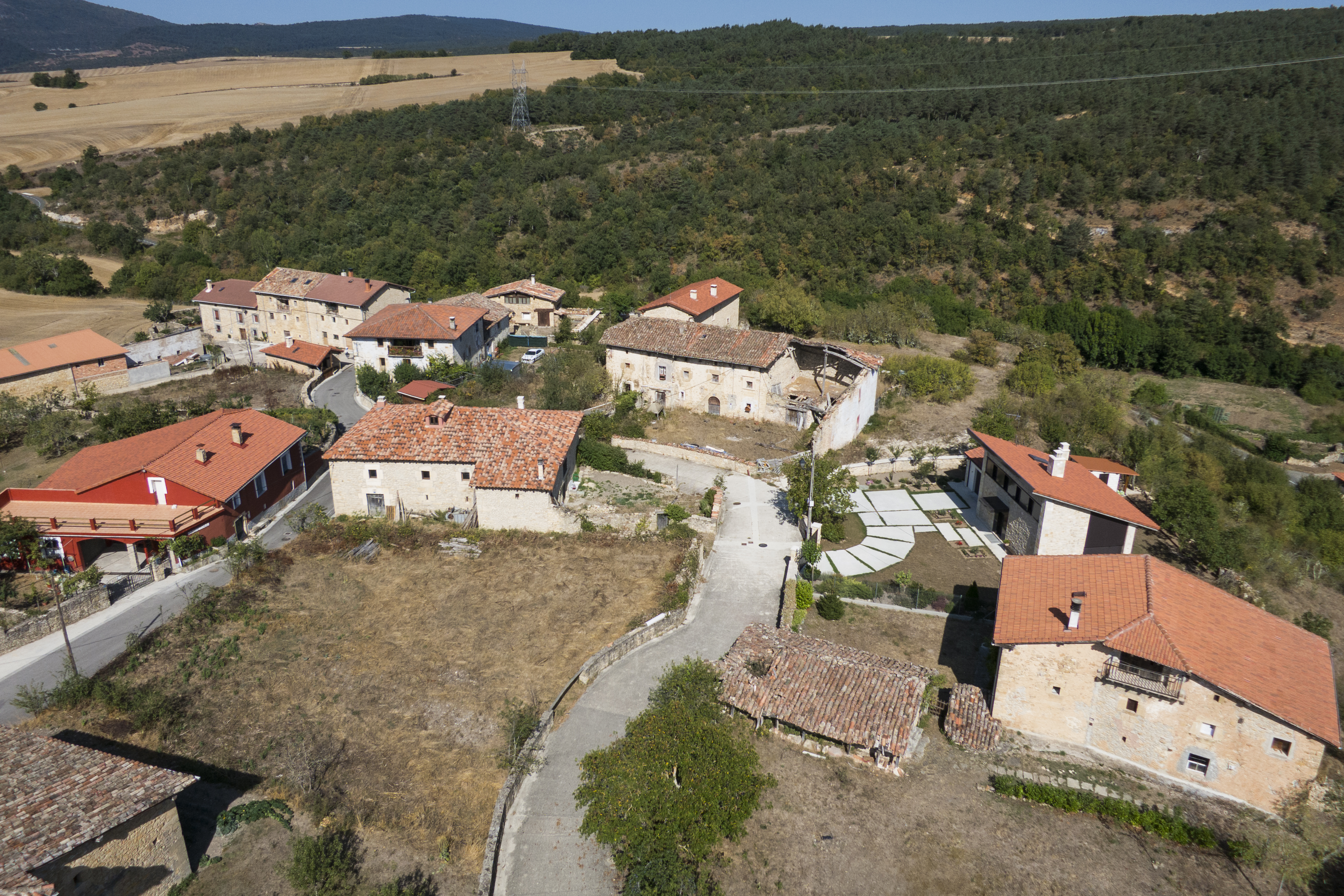

- Location within Álava Location within the Basque Country Location within Spain
- Coordinates: 42°54′32″N 3°10′04″W
- Country: Spain
- Autonomous community: Basque Country
- Province: Álava
- Comarca: Añana
- Municipality: Valdegovía/Gaubea

Area
  - Total: 7.11 km^{2} (2.75 sq mi)
- Elevation: 763 m (2,503 ft)

Population (2023)
  - Total: 7
  - Density: 0.98/km^{2} (2.5/sq mi)
- Postal code: 01427

Valluerca is a hamlet and concejo in the municipality of Valdegovía/Gaubea, in Álava province, Basque Country, Spain.
