= Corro =

Hamlet in Álava, Spain

- Concejo
- Location within Álava Location within the Basque Country Location within Spain
- Coordinates: 42°53′N 3°10′W
- Country: Spain
- Autonomous community: Basque Country
- Province: Álava
- Comarca: Añana
- Municipality: Valdegovía/Gaubea

Area
  - Total: 9.24 km^{2} (3.57 sq mi)
- Elevation: 680 m (2,230 ft)

Population (2023)
  - Total: 35
  - Density: 3.8/km^{2} (9.8/sq mi)
- Postal code: 01427

Corro is a hamlet and concejo in the municipality of Valdegovía/Gaubea, in Álava province, Basque Country, Spain.
