= Tobillas =

Hamlet in Álava, Spain

- Concejo
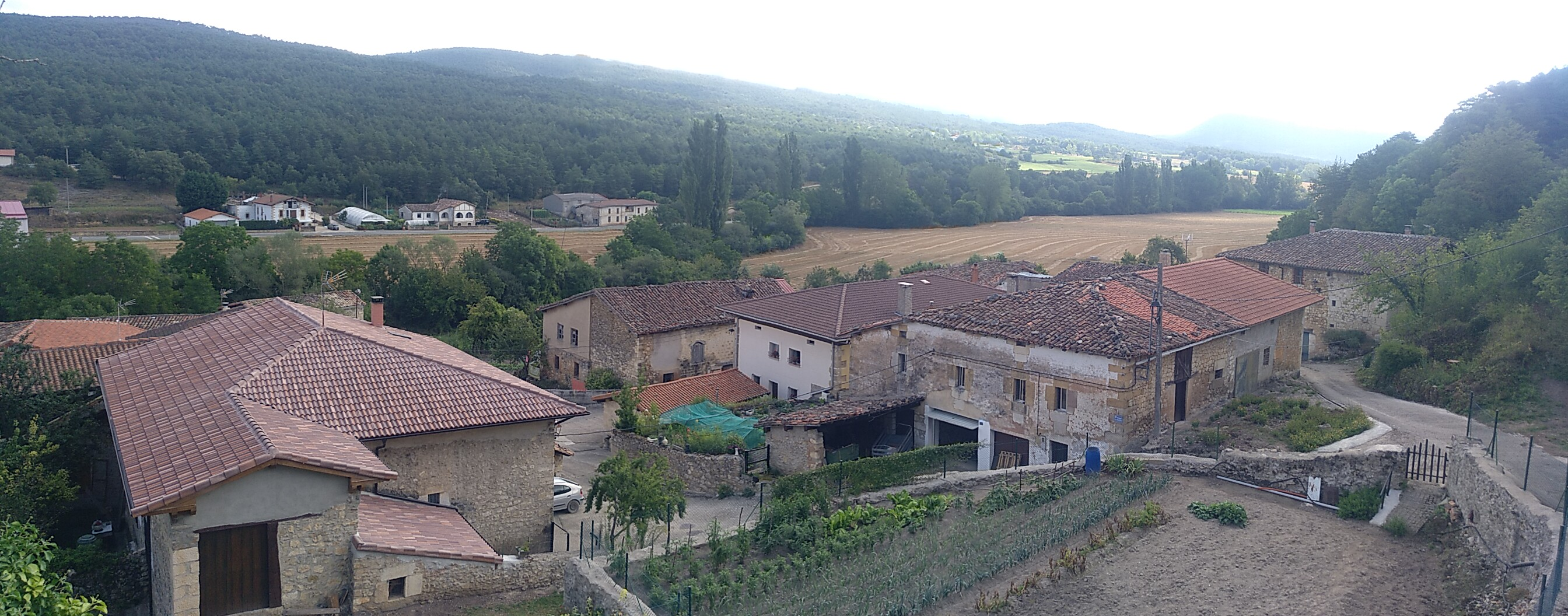
- View of Tobillas

- Location within Álava Location within the Basque Country Location within Spain
- Coordinates: 42°52′49″N 3°11′05″W
- Country: Spain
- Autonomous community: Basque Country
- Province: Álava
- Comarca: Añana
- Municipality: Valdegovía/Gaubea

Area
  - Total: 4.73 km^{2} (1.83 sq mi)
- Elevation: 658 m (2,159 ft)

Population (2023)
  - Total: 17
  - Density: 3.6/km^{2} (9.3/sq mi)
- Postal code: 01427

Tobillas is a hamlet and concejo in the municipality of Valdegovía/Gaubea, in Álava province, Basque Country, Spain.
