= Villamaderne =

Hamlet in Álava, Spain

- Concejo
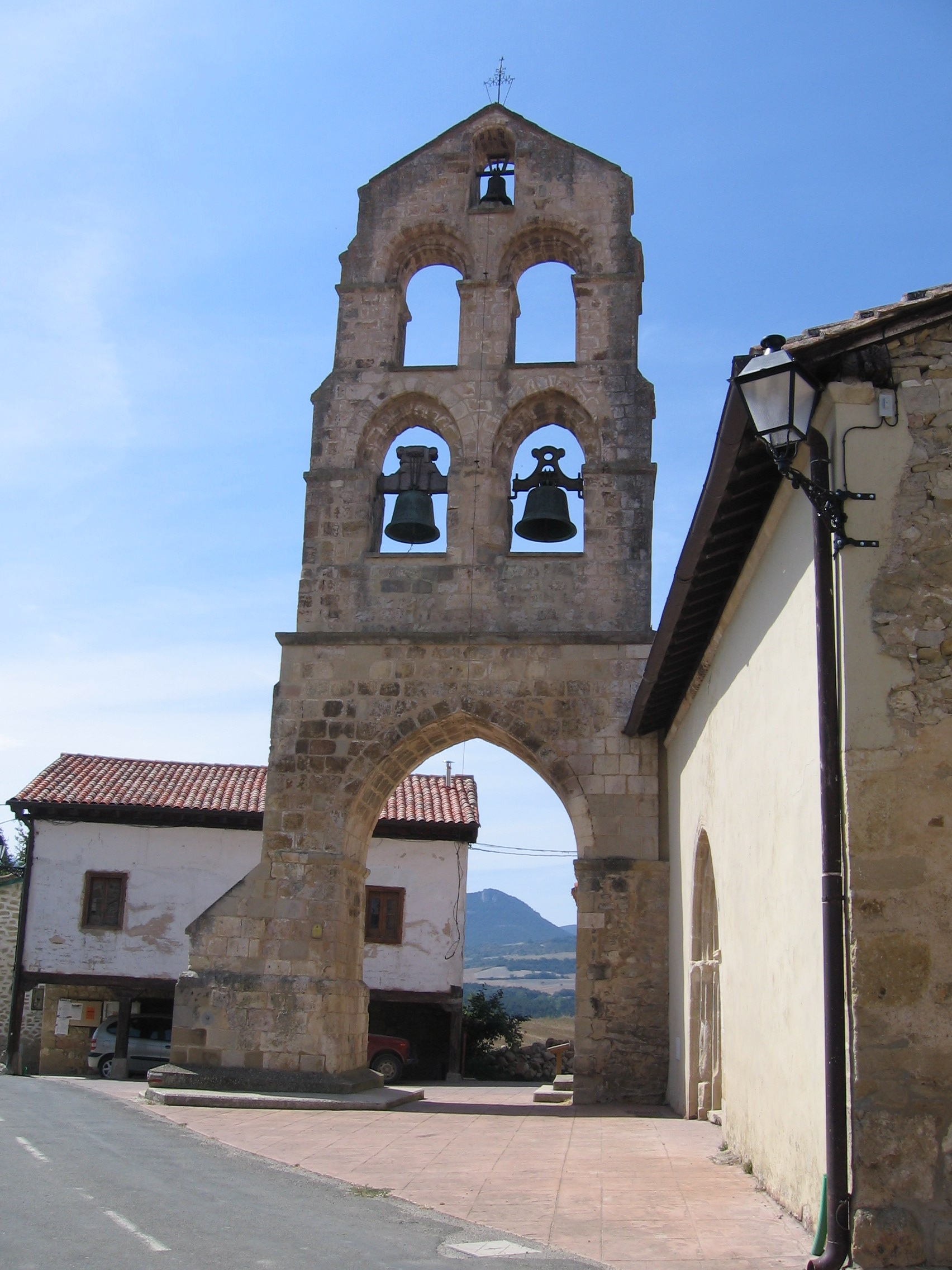
- The bell tower of the parish church of Villamaderne

- Location within Álava Location within the Basque Country Location within Spain
- Coordinates: 42°49′20″N 3°02′28″W
- Country: Spain
- Autonomous community: Basque Country
- Province: Álava
- Comarca: Añana
- Municipality: Valdegovía/Gaubea

Area
  - Total: 9.74 km^{2} (3.76 sq mi)
- Elevation: 550 m (1,800 ft)

Population (2023)
  - Total: 31
  - Density: 3.2/km^{2} (8.2/sq mi)
- Postal code: 01423

Villamaderne is a hamlet and concejo in the municipality of Valdegovía/Gaubea, Álava province, Basque Country, Spain. The concejo also includes the hamlet of Bellojín.

== Heritage ==
The parish church is dedicated to San Millán. Originally a Romanesque building, it was substantially reformed by Fausto Íñiguez de Betolaza in the early 20th century. Additionally, there are two chapels in Villamaderne, dedicated to Santa Lucía and Nuestra Señora de la Blanca.

The most notable civil buildings in Villamaderne are the palace-tower and the Venta Blanca, located next to the chapel of Nustra Señora de la Blanca.
