= Pinedo, Álava =

Hamlet in Álava, Spain

Pinedo
- Concejo
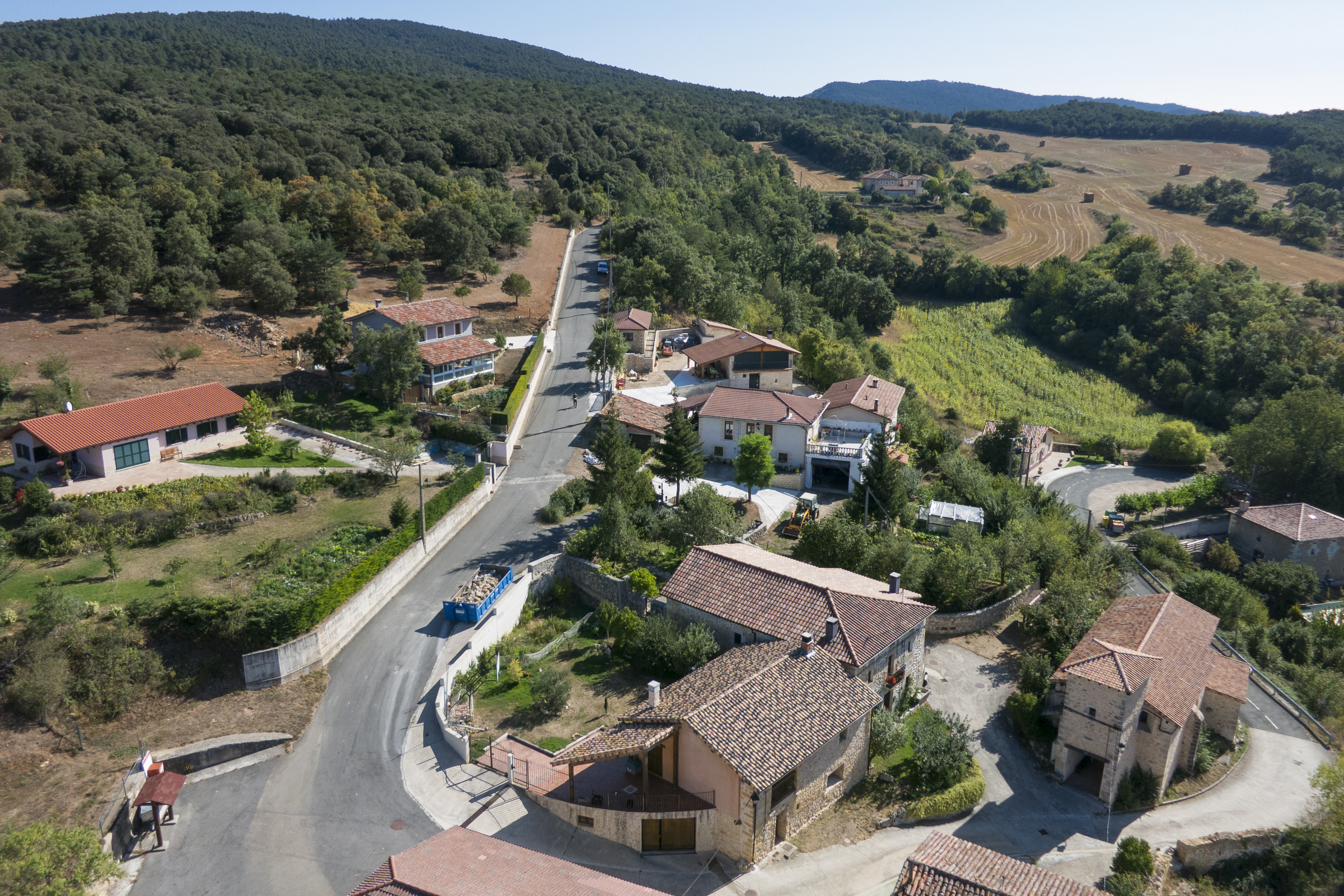

- Location within Álava Location within the Basque Country Location within Spain
- Coordinates: 42.875°N 3.149°W
- Country: Spain
- Autonomous community: Basque Country
- Province: Álava
- Comarca: Añana
- Municipality: Valdegovía/Gaubea

Area
  - Total: 3.49 km^{2} (1.35 sq mi)
- Elevation: 720 m (2,360 ft)

Population (2023)
  - Total: 19
  - Density: 5.4/km^{2} (14/sq mi)
- Postal code: 01427

Pinedo is a hamlet and concejo in the municipality of Valdegovía/Gaubea, in Álava province, Basque Country, Spain.
