= Barrio, Álava =

Hamlet in Álava, Spain

Barrio
- Concejo
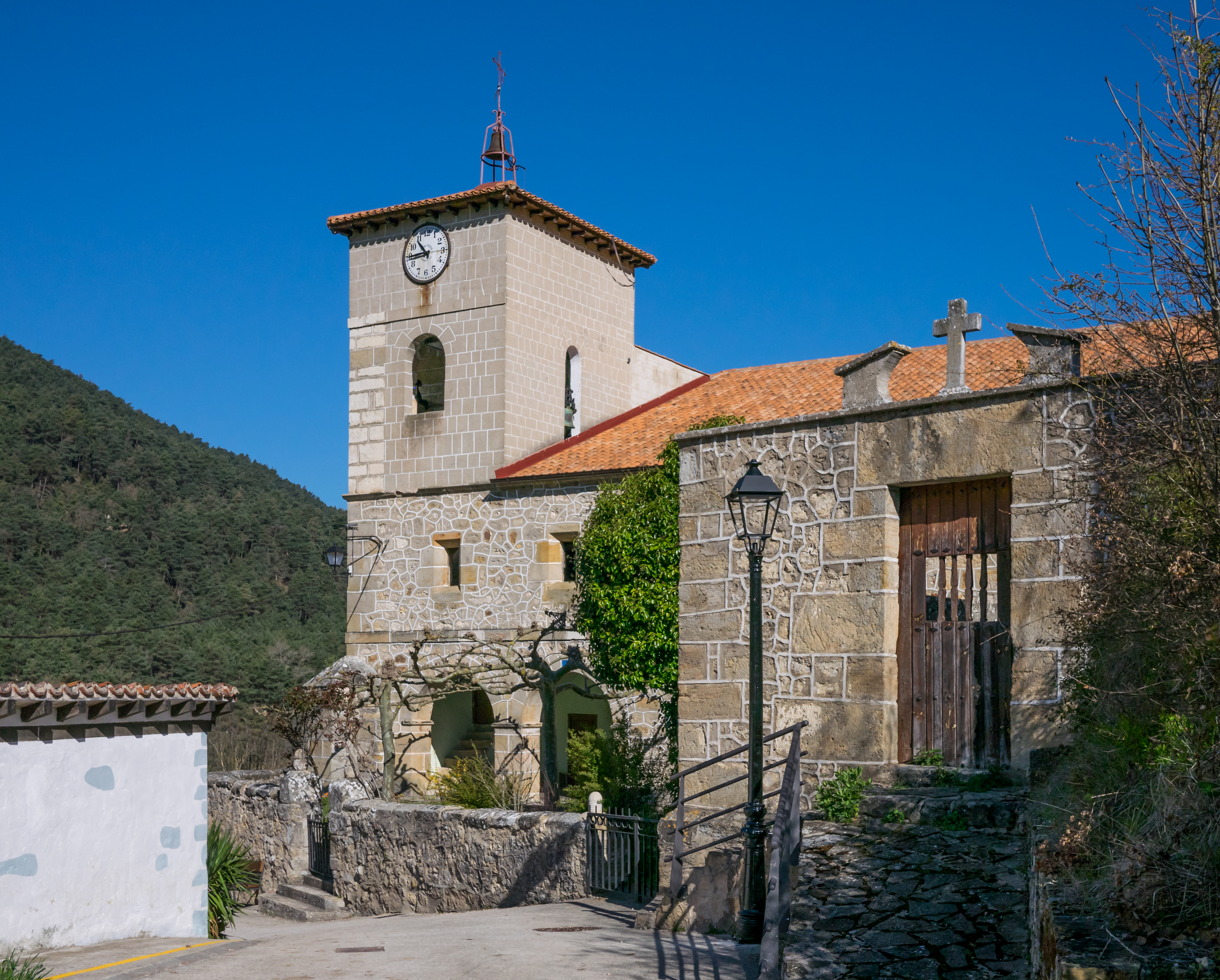
- View of Barrio

- Location within Álava Location within the Basque Country Location within Spain
- Coordinates: 42°48′32″N 3°05′20″W
- Country: Spain
- Autonomous community: Basque Country
- Province: Álava
- Comarca: Añana
- Municipality: Valdegovía/Gaubea

Area
  - Total: 7.11 km^{2} (2.75 sq mi)
- Elevation: 701 m (2,300 ft)

Population (2023)
  - Total: 21
  - Density: 3.0/km^{2} (7.6/sq mi)
- Postal code: 01423

Barrio is a hamlet and concejo in the municipality of Valdegovía/Gaubea, in Álava province, Basque Country, Spain.
