= Berrostegieta =

Village in Álava, Spain

- Concejo
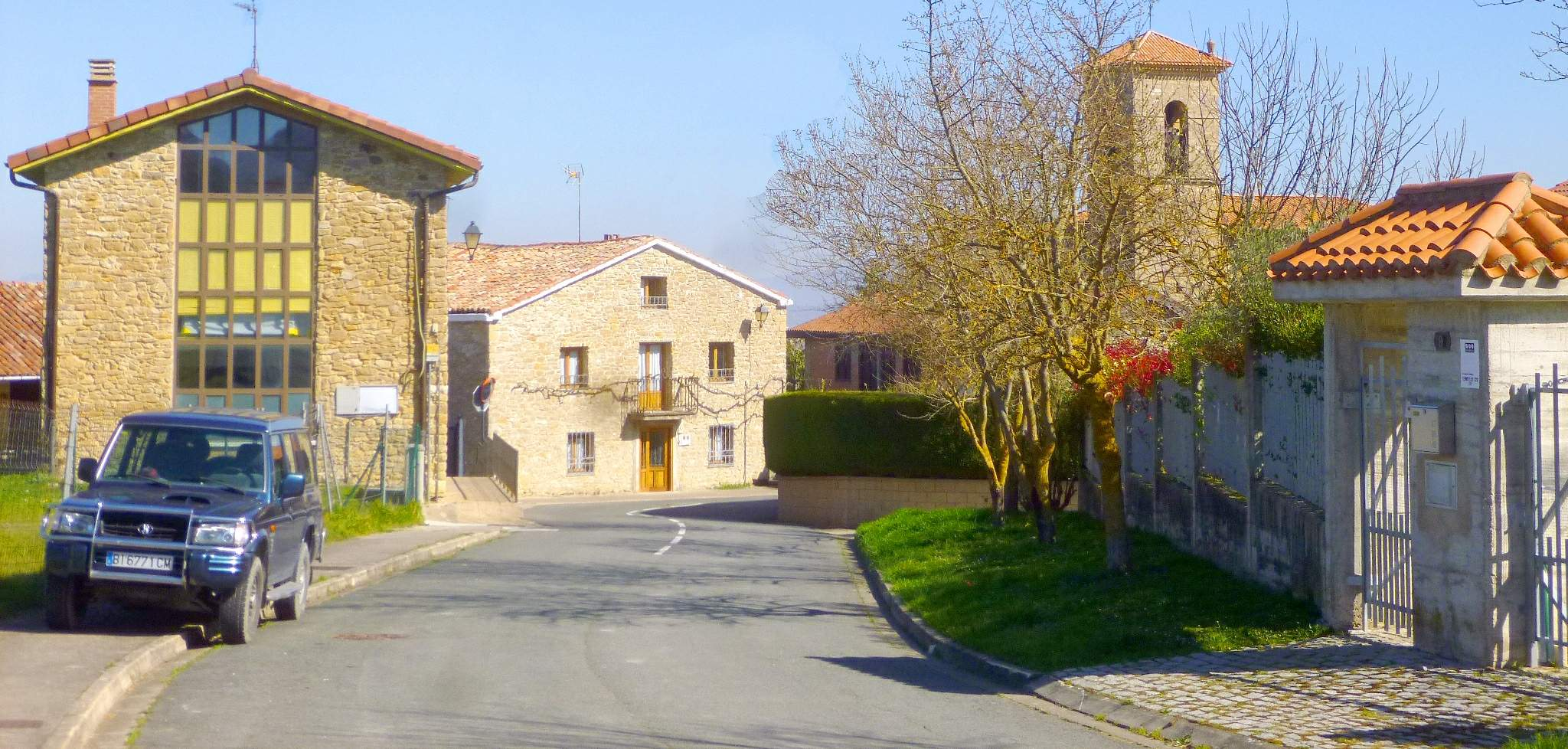
- View of Berrostegieta

- Coat of arms

- Location within Álava Location within the Basque Country Location within Spain
- Coordinates: 42°48′47″N 2°42′37″W
- Country: Spain
- Autonomous community: Basque Country
- Province: Álava
- Comarca: Vitoria-Gasteiz
- Municipality: Vitoria-Gasteiz

Area
  - Total: 4.88 km^{2} (1.88 sq mi)
- Elevation: 617 m (2,024 ft)

Population (2023)
  - Total: 150
  - Density: 31/km^{2} (80/sq mi)
- Postal code: 01194

Berrostegieta (Spanish: Berrosteguieta, alternatively in Basque: Berroztegieta) is a village and concejo in the municipality of Vitoria-Gasteiz, in Álava province, Basque Country, Spain.

It is mentioned for the first time in De ferro de Álava, a document included in the Becerro Galicano.
