= Guinea, Álava =

Hamlet in Álava, Spain

Guinea
- Hamlet
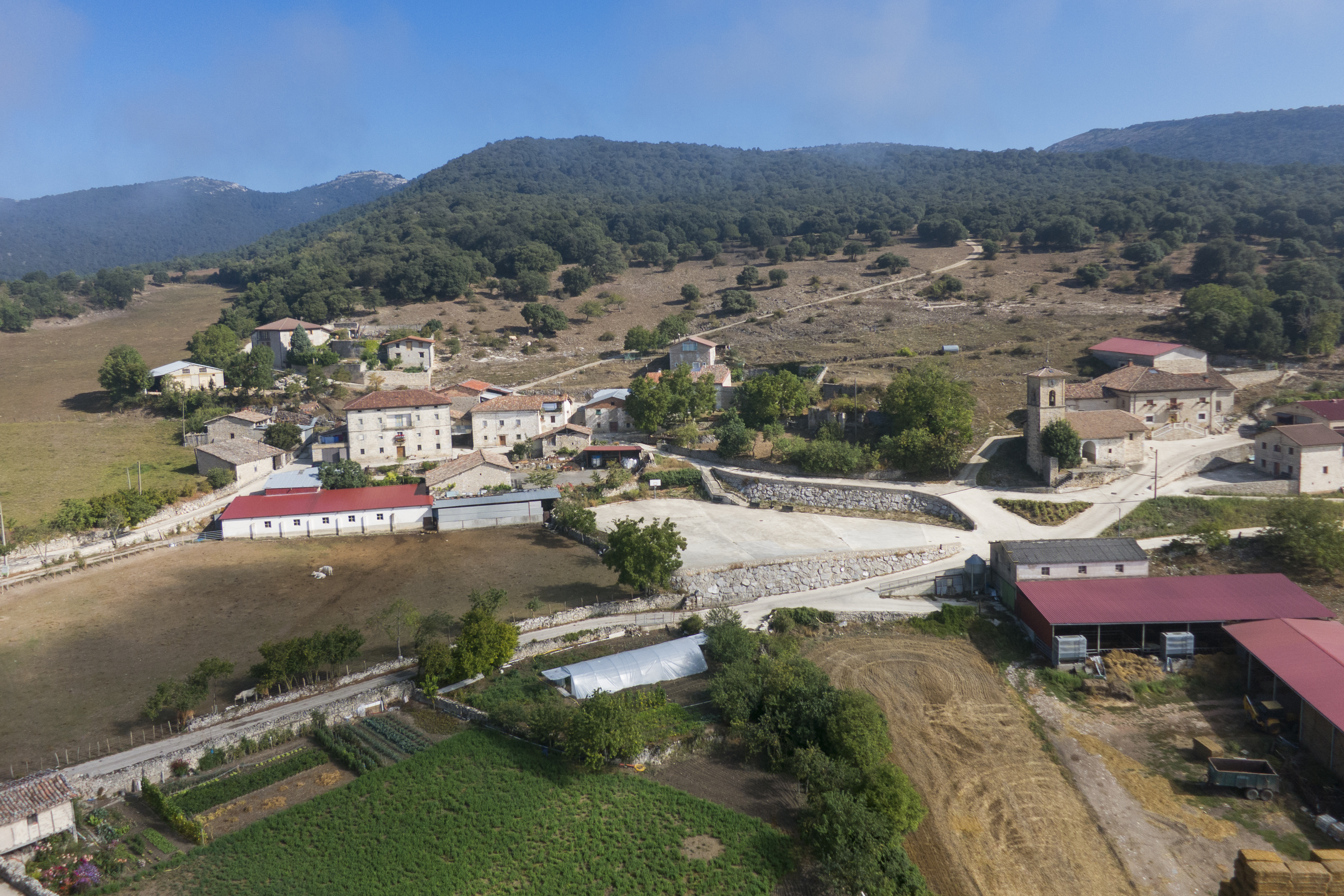

- Location within Álava Location within the Basque Country Location within Spain
- Coordinates: 42°51′12″N 3°00′51″W
- Country: Spain
- Autonomous community: Basque Country
- Province: Álava
- Comarca: Añana
- Municipality: Valdegovía/Gaubea

Area
  - Total: 8.91 km^{2} (3.44 sq mi)
- Elevation: 707 m (2,320 ft)

Population (2023)
  - Total: 20
  - Density: 2.2/km^{2} (5.8/sq mi)
- Postal code: 01428

Guinea (Basque: Ginea) is a hamlet and former concejo in the municipality of Valdegovía/Gaubea, in Álava province, Basque Country, Spain. In 2024, the Foral Deputation of Álava initiated the procedure to dissolve the concejo upon the request of its inhabitants. Disputes among them affected the governance of the concejo, which resulted in the decision to dissolve it. The entity was formally dissolved in November 2024.
