= Osma (disambiguation) =

Osma may refer to:

== Places ==
- Burgo de Osma-Ciudad de Osma, a municipality in Spain
- Osma, Álava, a hamlet and concejo in Spain

== People ==
- Alessandra de Osma (born 1988), Peruvian attorney, handbag designer, and former model
- Antonio Valero Osma (born 1955), Spanish actor known as Antonio Valero
- Armando Osma (1961–2025), Colombian football player and manager
- Joaquin Jose de Osma (1812–1896), Peruvian diplomat
- Osma Gallinger Tod (1895–1983), American artist, writer, and arts educator

== Miscellaneous ==
- Osma, ISO 15924 code for the Osmanya alphabet
- Odesa State Maritime Academy, former name of Odesa Maritime Academy in Odesa, Ukraine

== See also ==
- Osama (disambiguation)
- Osmia, genus of bees
- Ozma (disambiguation)
