= Astúlez =

Hamlet in Álava, Spain

Astúlez/Estuliz
- Hamlet
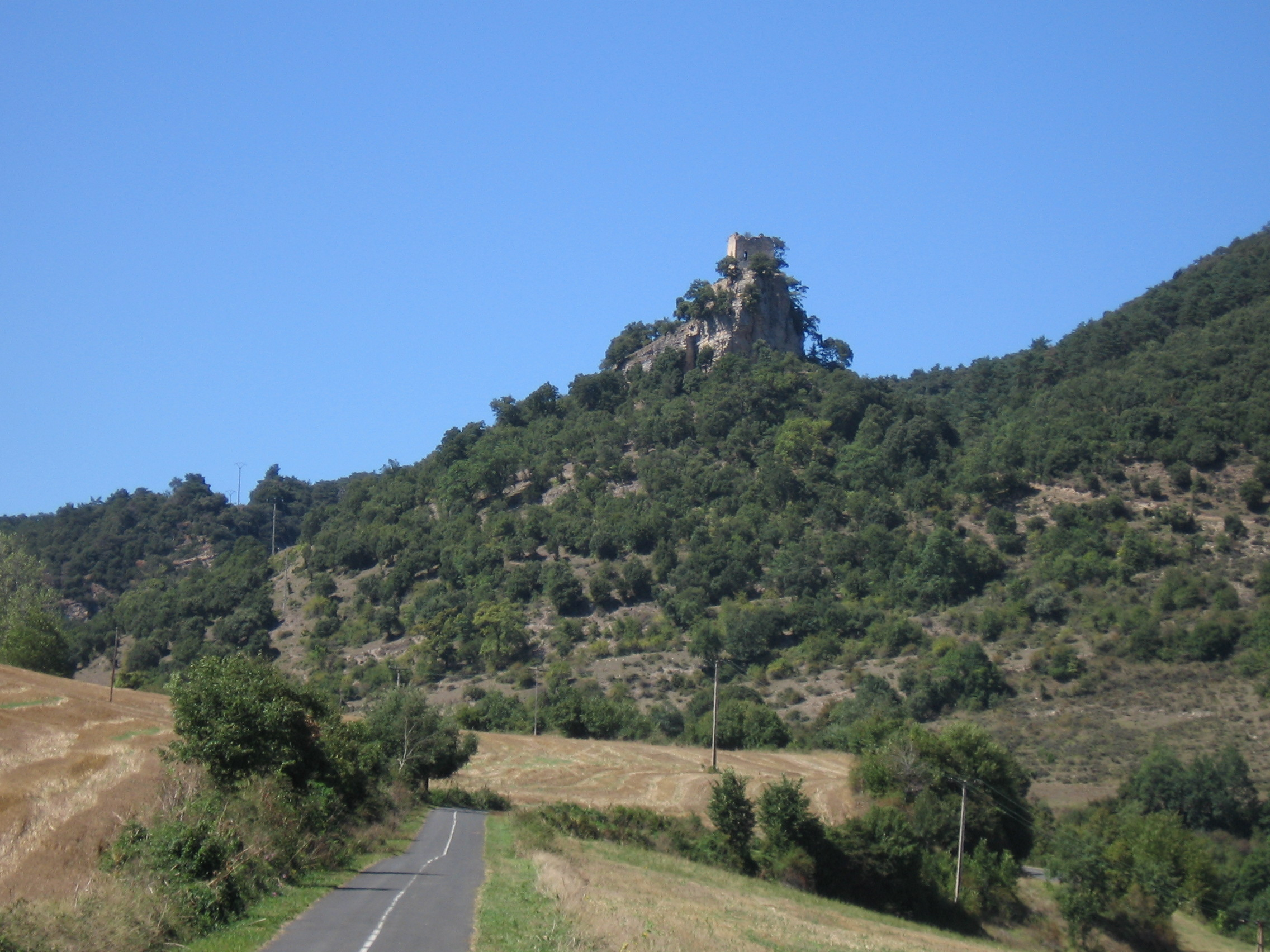
- The castle of Astúlez

- Location within Álava Location within the Basque Country Location within Spain
- Coordinates: 42°52′55″N 3°05′14″W
- Country: Spain
- Autonomous community: Basque Country
- Province: Álava
- Comarca: Añana
- Municipality: Valdegovía/Gaubea
- Elevation: 660 m (2,170 ft)

Population (2023)
  - Total: 7
- Postal code: 01426

Astúlez (Spanish pronunciation: [asˈtuleθ]) or Estuliz (Basque pronunciation: [estulis̻]) (Note: Estuliz is the official Basque name, but Euskaltzaindia recommends the usage of Astúlez in Basque.) is a hamlet in the municipality of Valdegovía/Gaubea, in Álava province, Basque Country, Spain.
