= Ozma =

Ozma may refer to:

== Fictional characters ==
- Princess Ozma, ruler of the fictional land of Oz
- Ozma Lee, in Macross Frontier
- Ozma, a superboss in Final Fantasy IX and Final Fantasy XIV
- Ozma, the Ra-seru of thunder in Legend of Legaia
- Ozma, a character in RWBY

== Music ==
- Ozma (band), a rock band from Pasadena, California
- DJ Ozma, Japanese pop singer
- Ozma (album), a 1989 album by the Melvins

== Other uses ==
- Project Ozma, a pioneering experiment in the 1960s in the search for extraterrestrial intelligence
- The Ozma problem, a philosophical problem posed in The Ambidextrous Universe by Martin Gardner
- Ozuma (オズマ; stylized as OZMA), a 2012 Japanese anime television series
- Frances Ozma Baum Mantele, L. Frank Baum's first granddaughter.

== See also ==
- Osma (disambiguation)
- Ausma (disambiguation)
