= Osma, Álava =

Hamlet in Álava, Spain

Osma
- Concejo
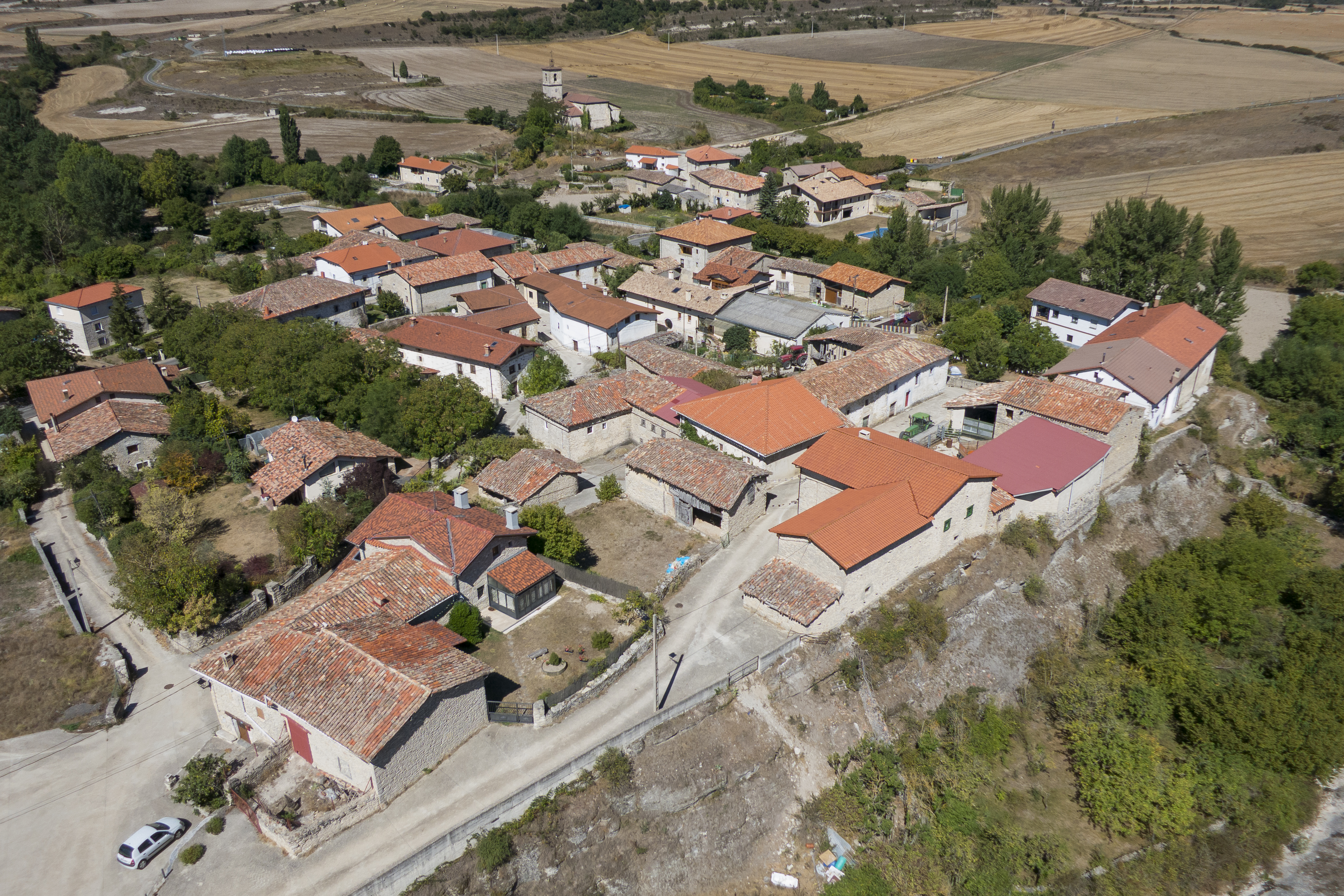

- Location within Álava Location within the Basque Country Location within Spain
- Coordinates: 42°53′27″N 3°03′52″W
- Country: Spain
- Autonomous community: Basque Country
- Province: Álava
- Comarca: Añana
- Municipality: Valdegovía/Gaubea

Area
  - Total: 8.93 km^{2} (3.45 sq mi)
- Elevation: 580 m (1,900 ft)

Population (2023)
  - Total: 32
  - Density: 3.6/km^{2} (9.3/sq mi)
- Postal code: 01426

Osma is a hamlet and concejo in the municipality of Valdegovía/Gaubea, in Álava province, Basque Country, Spain.
