= Valdegovía/Gaubea =

Coordinates: 42°51′N 3°6′W

Valdegovía / Gaubea Gaubea (Basque)
- Municipality
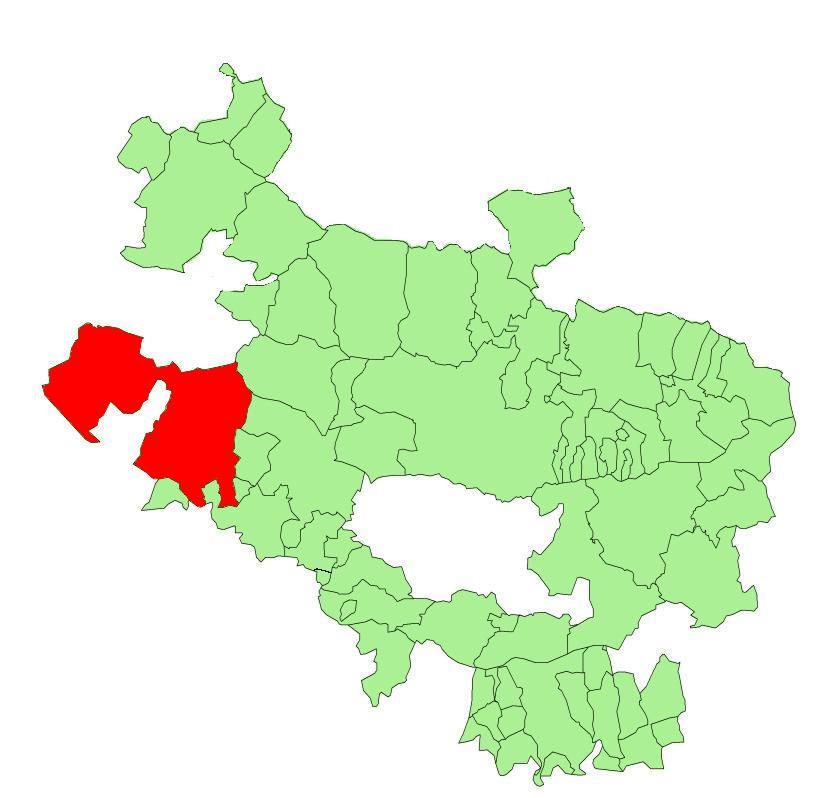
- Location of Valdegovía/Gaubea within Álava Province

- Coat of arms
- Interactive map of Valdegovía / Gaubea
- Country: Spain
- Autonomous community: País Vasco
- Province: Álava
- Eskualdea / Comarca: Añana

Government
  - Mayor: Juan Carlos Ramírez-Escudero (EAJ-PNV)

Area
  - Total: 244.06 km^{2} (94.23 sq mi)
- Elevation: 553 m (1,814 ft)

Population (2010)
  - Total: 1,106
  - Density: 4.532/km^{2} (11.74/sq mi)
- Time zone: UTC+1 (CET)
  - Summer (DST): UTC+2 (CEST)
- Postal code: 01426 / 01427
- Official language(s): Basque, Spanish
- Website: Official website

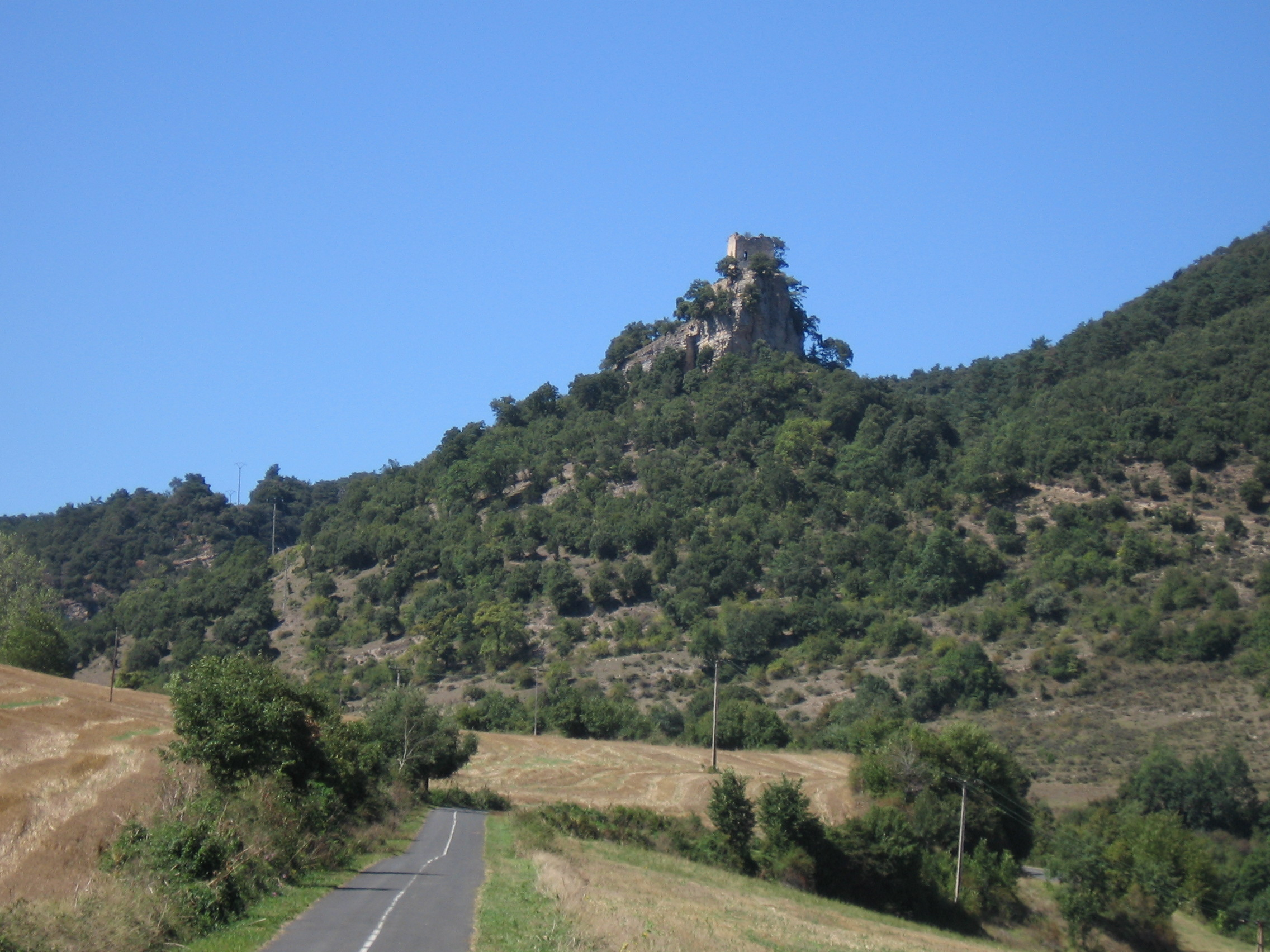
Castle in Astúlez, a village that does not belong to any Concejo and is administered directly by the Valdegovía/Gaubea municipality

Valdegovía/Gaubea (Spanish: Valdegovía, Basque: Gaubea) is a town and municipality located in the province of Álava, in the Basque Country (autonomous community), northern Spain.

The town-hall is located in Villanueva de Valdegovía / Uribarri Gaubea. There is a factory producing mantecadas in Tuesta.

== Villages ==
The municipal term includes 30 small villages, some of which are grouped in Concejos:

- Acebedo
- Astúlez
- Bachicabo
- Barrio
- Basabe
- Bóveda
- Caranca y Mioma, Concejo formed by Caranca and Mioma villages
- Karkamu (Cárcamo)
- Corro
- Espejo
- Fresneda
- Ginea
- Gurendes-Quejo, Concejo formed by Gurendes and Quejo
- Nograro
- Osma
- Pinedo
- Quintanilla
- Tobillas
- Tuesta
- Valderejo, Concejo formed by Lahoz, Lalastra, Ribera and Villamardones
- Valluerca
- Villamaderne, includes Bellojín village
- Villanañe
- Villanueva de Valdegovía-Uribarri Gaubea, main town

== Gallery ==
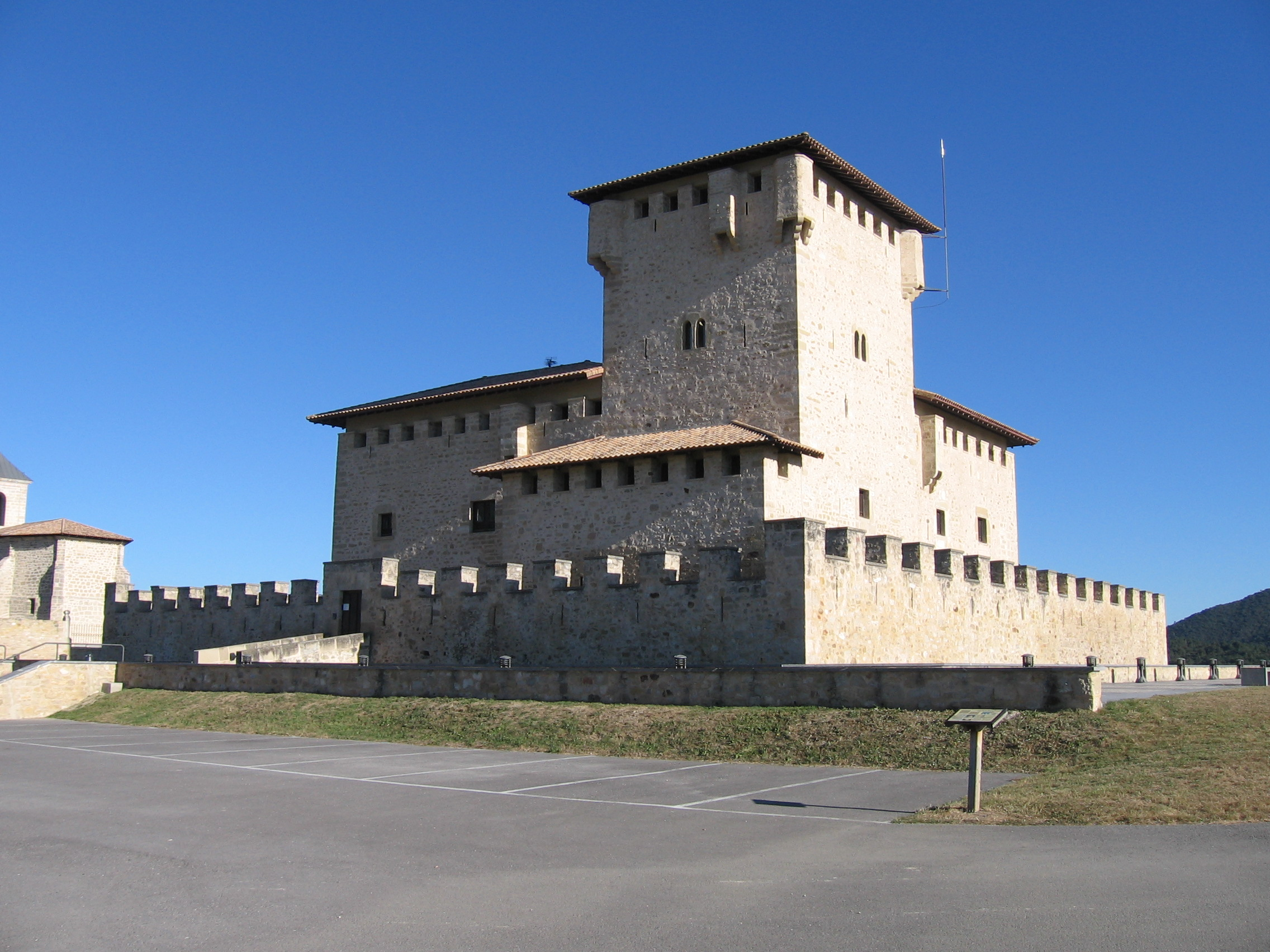
Varona tower-house in Villanañe

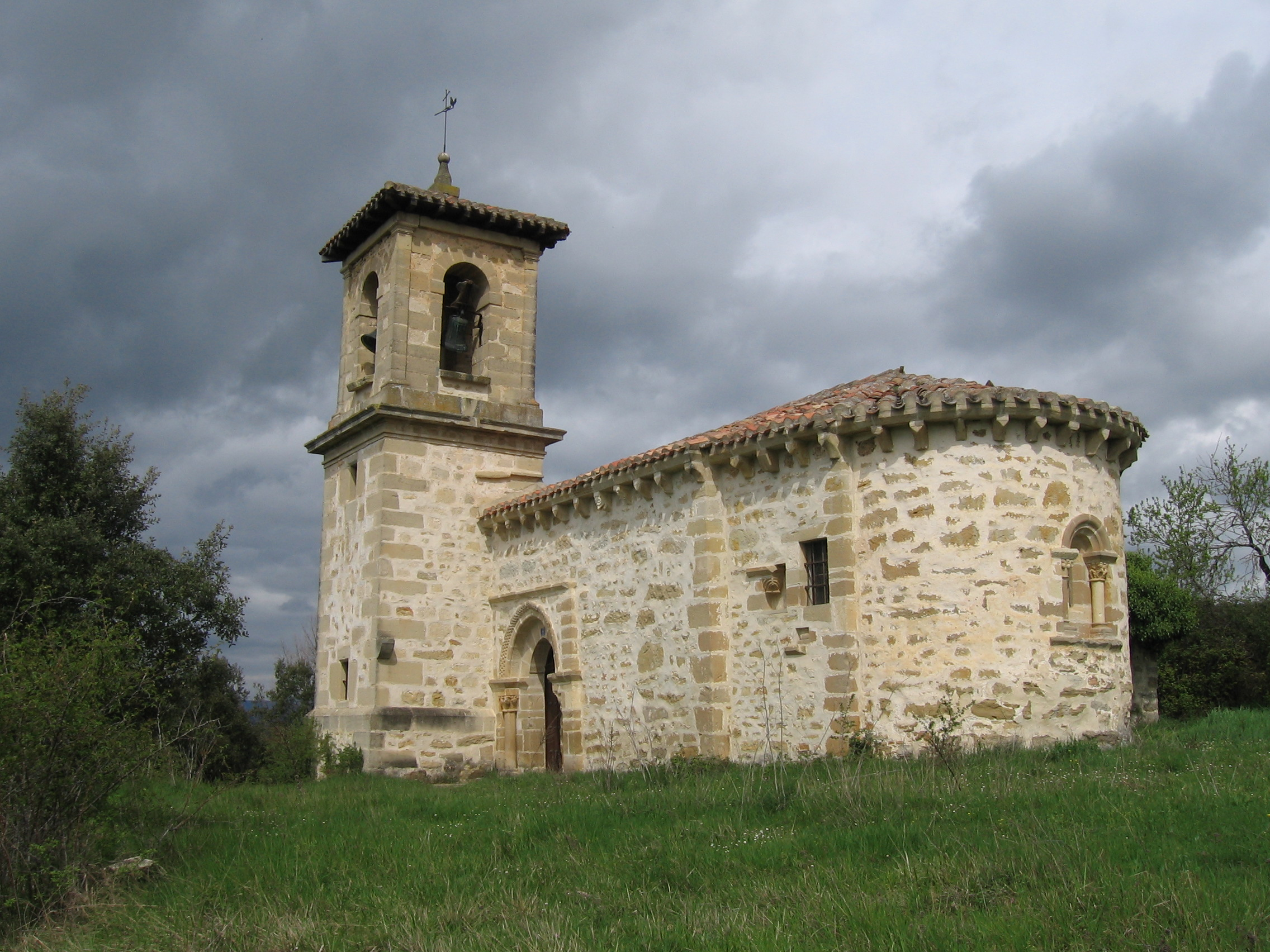
Bellojín church

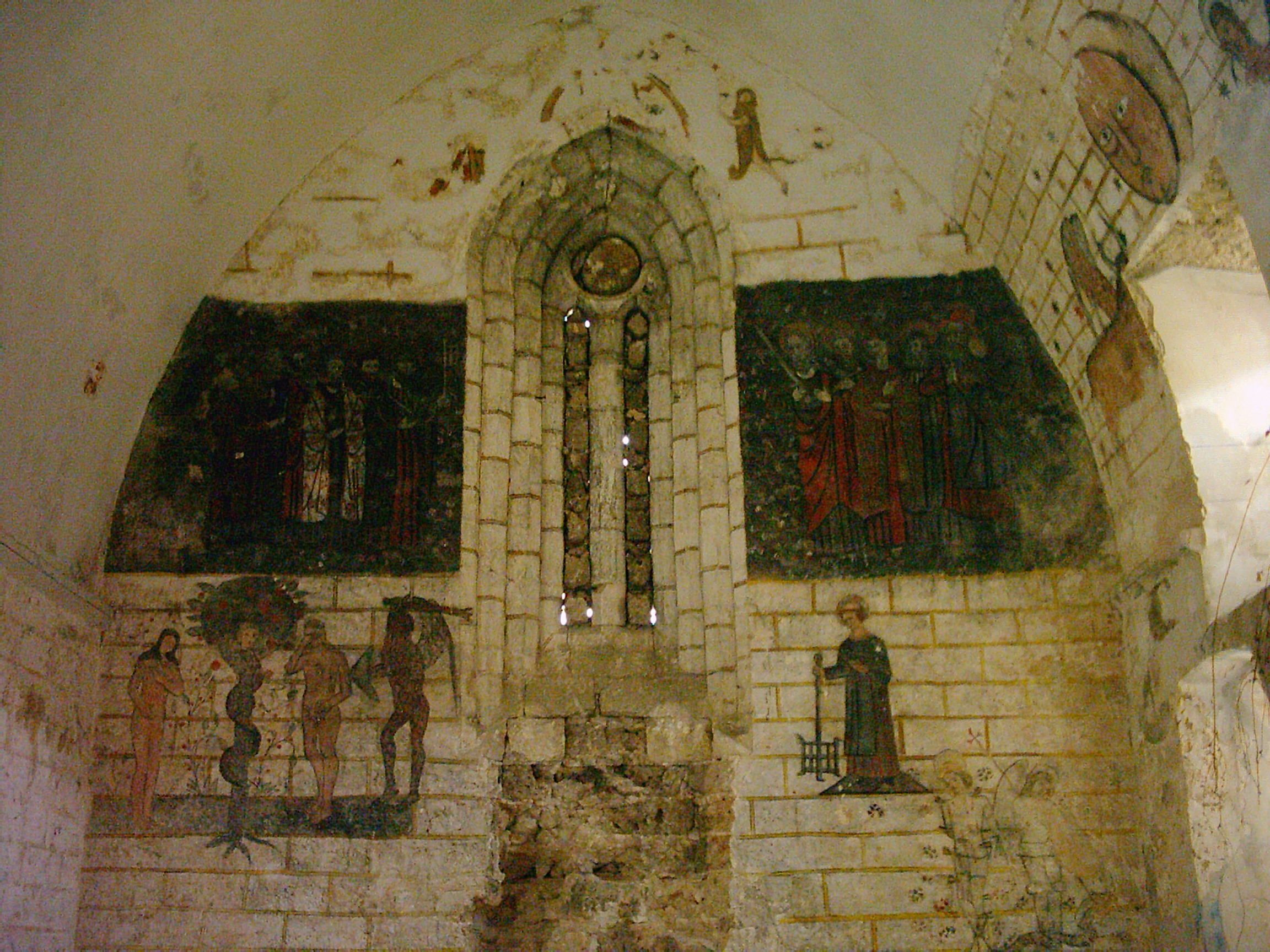
Mural paintings in the Ribera church
