= Luc Esquivel transgender sports lawsuit =

American legal incident

- Date: November 2021
- Location: Tennessee, U.S.
- Participants: Luc Esquivel
- Outcome: Summary judgement

The Luc Esquivel transgender sports lawsuit was a 2021 American legal incident involving Luc Esquivel, a 14-year-old transgender boy attending a high school in Knoxville, Tennessee, who was banned from competing on the school's boys' golf team.

This was the ACLU's fifth lawsuit in response to an anti-trans bill passed in 2021.

In March 2021, Tennessee Governor Bill Lee signed legislation that barred transgender students from being on sports teams that align with their gender identity.

In November 2021, Lambda Legal, the American Civil Liberties Union, and the ACLU of Tennessee filed a lawsuit on behalf of Esquivel, saying that the law was unconstitutional.

According to NBC News, Esquivel, who played golf since age 11, said that when he first heard about the legislation he became "very angry" and said "All I wanted to do is play with some other guys as a team to get better at the sport."

Sasha Buchert, a senior attorney for Lambda Legal, worked on Esquivel’s case.

Esquivel's attorneys said the law violated the equal protection clause of the constitution’s 14th Amendment, which requires a state’s laws to treat all people equally, as well as Title IX, which prohibits discrimination on the basis of sex in any education program or activity which receives federal funds.

== Verdict ==
The case, L.E. v. Lee, resided over by Waverly D. Crenshaw, Jr., Chief United States District Judge, resulted in a summary judgment, meaning the case was ended without going to a jury trial.
