= Eskibel =

Hamlet in Álava, Spain

- Concejo
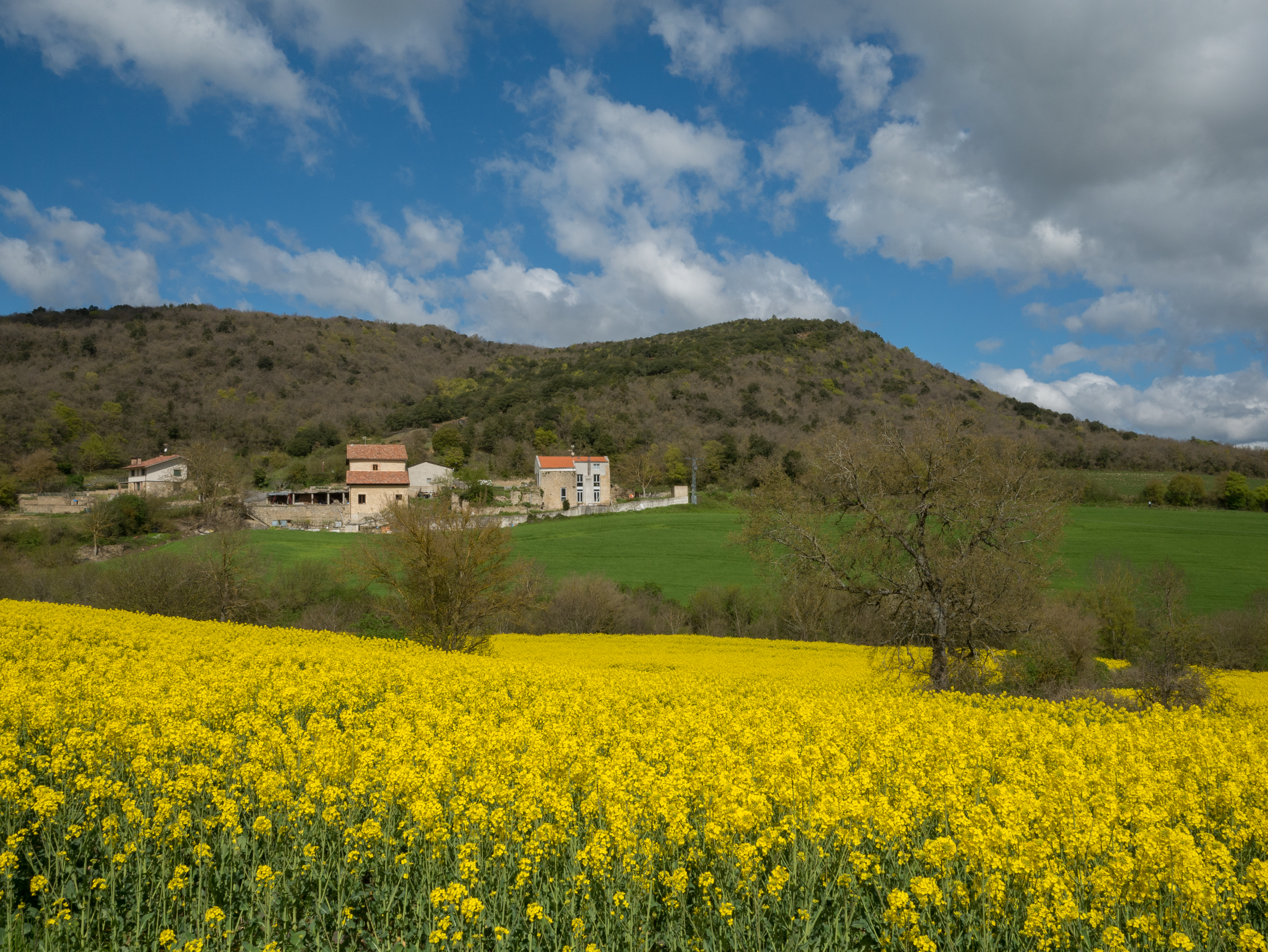
- View of Eskibel

- Location within Álava Location within the Basque Country Location within Spain
- Coordinates: 42°48′40″N 2°43′25″W
- Country: Spain
- Autonomous community: Basque Country
- Province: Álava
- Comarca: Vitoria-Gasteiz
- Municipality: Vitoria-Gasteiz

Area
  - Total: 1.18 km^{2} (0.46 sq mi)
- Elevation: 660 m (2,170 ft)

Population (2022)
  - Total: 2
  - Density: 1.7/km^{2} (4.4/sq mi)
- Postal code: 01194

Eskibel (Spanish: Esquíbel) is a village in Álava, Basque Country, Spain. It forms part of the Southwestern Rural Zone of Vitoria-Gasteiz. It is situated 7.5 km (4.7 mi) southwest of the city in a small valley surrounded by the Mountains of Vitoria.

Always sparsely populated, in the early 19th century it had only 22 inhabitants, in 1960 it had 10, and as of 2023 it has only 2. The village comprises a few small buildings and the ruins of the Church of San Lorenzo (Saint Lawrence). A medieval statue, known as the Virgin of Eskibel, was salvaged from the church ruins and can now be seen at the Diocesan Museum of Sacred Art in Vitoria-Gasteiz. Despite having the status of concejo, the elections scheduled for 2013 and 2017 were not held due to a lack of candidates.

Eskibel was the site of fighting in the Spanish War of Independence in the early 19th century and later during the Second Carlist War, when Vitoria was sieged by the Carlists. The Castillo de Gomecha at Eskibel is the remains of an old fortified watch tower.
