= Concejo (Álava) =

Administrative subdivision of Spain

Concejos of Álava
- Location: Álava, Basque Country, Spain
- Found in: Municipality
- Number: 334 (Note: Before the dissolution of the concejo of Guinea, the number was also reported as being 333 or 334, depending on whether Arriaga and Eskibel were included or not. Arriaga is depopulated and has been absorbed into Vitoria-Gasteiz, but is still officially listed as a concejo. Similarly, Eskibel has 2 inhabitants as of 2021, and is sometimes omitted from the list.)

The concejos (Basque: kontzejuak, Spanish: concejos) are a type of sub-municipal administrative unit in the province of Álava, Basque Country, Spain.

Within the Spanish legal framework, the general name for such sub-municipal units is minor local entity (formally in Spanish: entidad de ámbito territorial inferior al municipio, lit. 'entity of sub-municipal territorial scope' also known by their acronym EATIMs).

The existence of concejos in Álava is documented since the 13th century. Their current status dates from 1984, when a law providing for elections to the concejos was passed; and from 1995, when their juridical status was clarified.

== See also ==
- Local government in Spain
