= Iturrieta =

Farm and common land in Álava, Spain

Parzonería de Iturrieta Iturrietako partzuergoa
- Parzonería
- Location of within the Basque Country Iturrieta (the Basque Country) Iturrieta (Spain)
- Coordinates: 42°47′36″N 2°20′40″W
- Country: Spain
- Autonomous community: Basque Country
- Province: Álava
- Comarca: Montaña Alavesa

Area
  - Total: 10.64 km^{2} (4.11 sq mi)
- Elevation: 987 m (3,238 ft)
- Time zone: UTC+1 (CET)
  - Summer (DST): UTC+2 (CEST)
- Official language(s): Basque; Spanish

Iturrieta (Basque pronunciation: [ituri.eta], Spanish pronunciation: [ituˈrjeta]) is an experimental farm in Álava, Basque Country, Spain. It is located within the Parzonería de Iturrieta (Basque: Iturrietako partzuergoa), a common land managed by neighboring villages.

== Etymology ==
The name is composed of iturri, the Basque word for "spring" or "source"; plus the common toponymic suffix -eta. Thus, the placename literally means "place with fountains" or "the fountains".

== History ==
The area has a large number of prehistoric megalithic monuments, but their dating is uncertain.

The first mention of Iturrieta was in 1563. By that time, the village was already abandoned, with its lands and St. Mary's chapel (the former parish church) managed jointly by the neighboring villages of Salvatierra, San Vicente de Arana, Kontrasta, Ullíbarri-Arana, Alda, Onraita and Róitegui.

On 27 May 1803, the authorities ordered the demolition of the chapel. The image it housed was first moved to the nearby Santa Teodosia chapel. Only two years later, in 1805, the neighboring villages decided to draw the image among themselves in order to avoid potential disputes. The hamlet of Onraita was selected, where the image still remains.

In 1933, during the Second Spanish Republic, the government tasked José María Díaz de Mendívil with devising a plan to improve the agricultural output of the province. A plot of land in the Parzonería de Iturrieta was selected as the location of the Estación de la Mejora de la Patata (Spanish for 'Station for the Improvement of the Potato'), commonly known as the Granja de Iturrieta (Spanish for 'Iturrieta Farm'). The location was chosen due to its high altitude, which makes the risk of viruses infecting the cultivars less likely.

The project was resumed after the civil war, with the currently existing chapel starting construction in 1946 and the farm starting operations in 1948. The Monumento al Patatero was built next to the chapel in 1984.

As of 2022, the farm is operated by NEIKER, an organism of the Basque Government dedicated to research in agronomy. Iturrieta is also the site of small observatory operated by the Sociedad Astronómica de Álava with MPC code J44.

== Administration ==
The Parzonería de Iturrieta is a common land, conterminous with the monte de utilidad pública 608. It is shared by the municipality of Salvatierra and the concejos of Alda, Kontrasta, San Vicente de Arana, Ullíbarri-Arana, Róitegui and Onraita. Its territory is unincorporated, not being part of any municipality. Despite often being shown in maps as part of the neighboring Parzonería de Entzia (another common land), it is a different entity.

== Notable people ==
- Pilar Unzalu (1957–2021), member of the Congress of Deputies
