= Pipaón =

Hamlet in Álava, Spain

- Concejo
- Location within Álava Location within the Basque Country Location within Spain
- Coordinates: 42°37′N 2°39′W
- Country: Spain
- Autonomous community: Basque Country
- Province: Álava
- Comarca: Montaña Alavesa
- Municipality: Arraia-Maeztu
- Elevation: 843 m (2,766 ft)

Population (2023)
  - Total: 40
- Postal code: 01211

Pipaón (Basque: Pipaon) is a hamlet and concejo in the municipality of Lagrán, Álava province, Basque Country, Spain.

== History ==
Pipaón was first mentioned in the fuero of La Puebla de Arganzón of 1191. It was mentioned again in 1254 in the fuero of Treviño. Pipaón was a settlement in the Tierras del Conde until 1802, when it was granted town status. This was commemorated in 2002 with the construction of a monolith. In 1977 the municipality of Pipaón was dissolved and merged into Lagrán.

== Landmarks ==
The parish church of Pipaón, dating from the late 16th century, is dedicated to the Feast of the Holy Cross. Some houses have façades dating from the 16th and 17th centuries. The Usatxi Ethnographic Museum, located in a house that belonged to the Ruiz de Samaniego family, exhibits items donated by the inhabitants of Pipaón.
