= Laminoria =

Concejo in Álava, Spain

- Concejo
- Real Valle de Laminoria (Spanish); Laminoriako Erret Harana (Basque)
- Location within Álava Location within the Basque Country Location within Spain
- Coordinates: 42°45′12″N 2°26′21″W
- Country: Spain
- Autonomous community: Basque Country
- Province: Álava
- Comarca: Montaña Alavesa
- Municipality: Arraia-Maeztu

Area
  - Total: 21.73 km^{2} (8.39 sq mi)

Population (2023)
  - Total: 98
  - Density: 4.5/km^{2} (12/sq mi)
- Postal code: 01129

Laminoria (officially in Spanish: Real Valle de Laminoria, lit. 'Royal Valley of Laminoria', Basque: Laminoriako Erret Harana) is a concejo in the municipality of Arraia-Maeztu, in Álava province, Basque Country, Spain. It comprises the hamlets of Aletxa, Arenaza/Areatza, Cicujano/Zekuiano, Ibisate, Leorza/Elortza and Musitu. It was an independent municipality until 1958, when it was fused with Apellániz and Arraya into the new municipality of Maestu (currently known as Arraia-Maeztu).
