= Loza, Álava =

Hamlet in Álava, Spain

Loza
- Concejo
- Location within Álava Location within the Basque Country Location within Spain
- Coordinates: 42°38′37″N 2°40′58″W
- Country: Spain
- Autonomous community: Basque Country
- Province: Álava
- Comarca: Montaña Alavesa
- Municipality: Peñacerrada-Urizaharra

Area
  - Total: 5.30 km^{2} (2.05 sq mi)
- Elevation: 800 m (2,600 ft)

Population (2023)
  - Total: 17
  - Density: 3.2/km^{2} (8.3/sq mi)
- Postal code: 01212

Loza is a hamlet and concejo in the municipality of Peñacerrada-Urizaharra, in Álava province, Basque Country, Spain.
