= Villafría, Álava =

Hamlet in Álava, Spain

Villafría
- Concejo
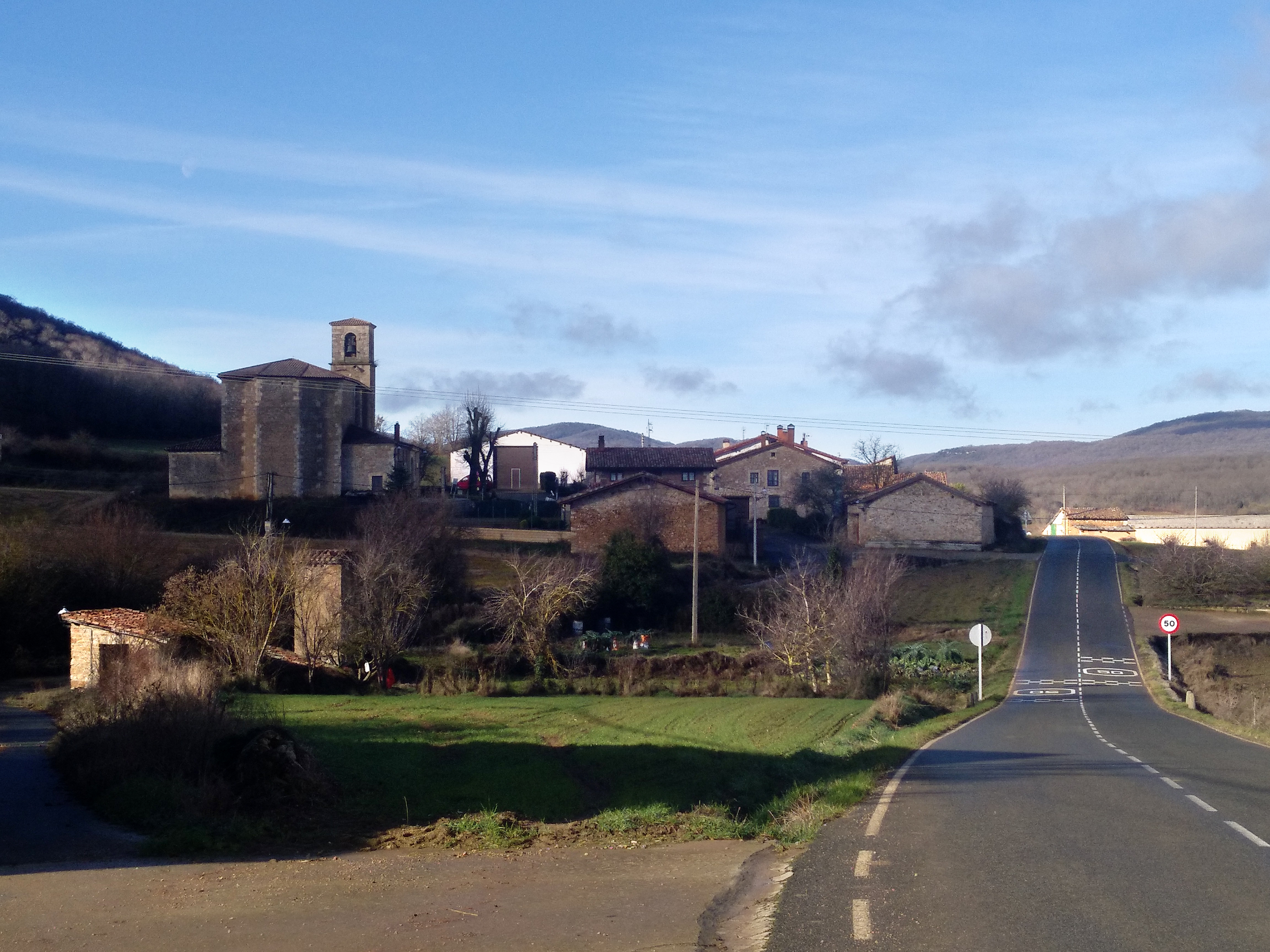
- View of Villafr

- Coat of arms

- Location within Álava Location within the Basque Country Location within Spain
- Coordinates: 42°36′N 2°30′W
- Country: Spain
- Autonomous community: Basque Country
- Province: Álava
- Comarca: Montaña Alavesa
- Municipality: Bernedo

Area
  - Total: 2.60 km^{2} (1.00 sq mi)
- Elevation: 719 m (2,359 ft)

Population (2023)
  - Total: 27
  - Density: 10/km^{2} (27/sq mi)
- Postal code: 01118

Villafría is a hamlet and concejo in the municipality of Bernedo, in Álava province, Basque Country, Spain.
