= Cicujano =

Hamlet in Álava, Spain

Cicujano/Zekuiano
- Concejo
- Location within Álava Location within the Basque Country Location within Spain
- Coordinates: 42°45′17″N 2°26′15″W
- Country: Spain
- Autonomous community: Basque Country
- Province: Álava
- Comarca: Montaña Alavesa
- Municipality: Arraia-Maeztu
- Elevation: 690 m (2,260 ft)

Population (2023)
  - Total: 11
- Postal code: 01129

Cicujano (Spanish pronunciation: [ˈθikuxano]) or Zekuiano (Basque pronunciation: [s̻ekui.ano]) is a hamlet in the municipality of Arraia-Maeztu, Álava province, Basque Country, Spain. It is the capital of the concejo of Laminoria.
