= Quintana, Álava =

Hamlet in Álava, Spain

Quintana
- Concejo
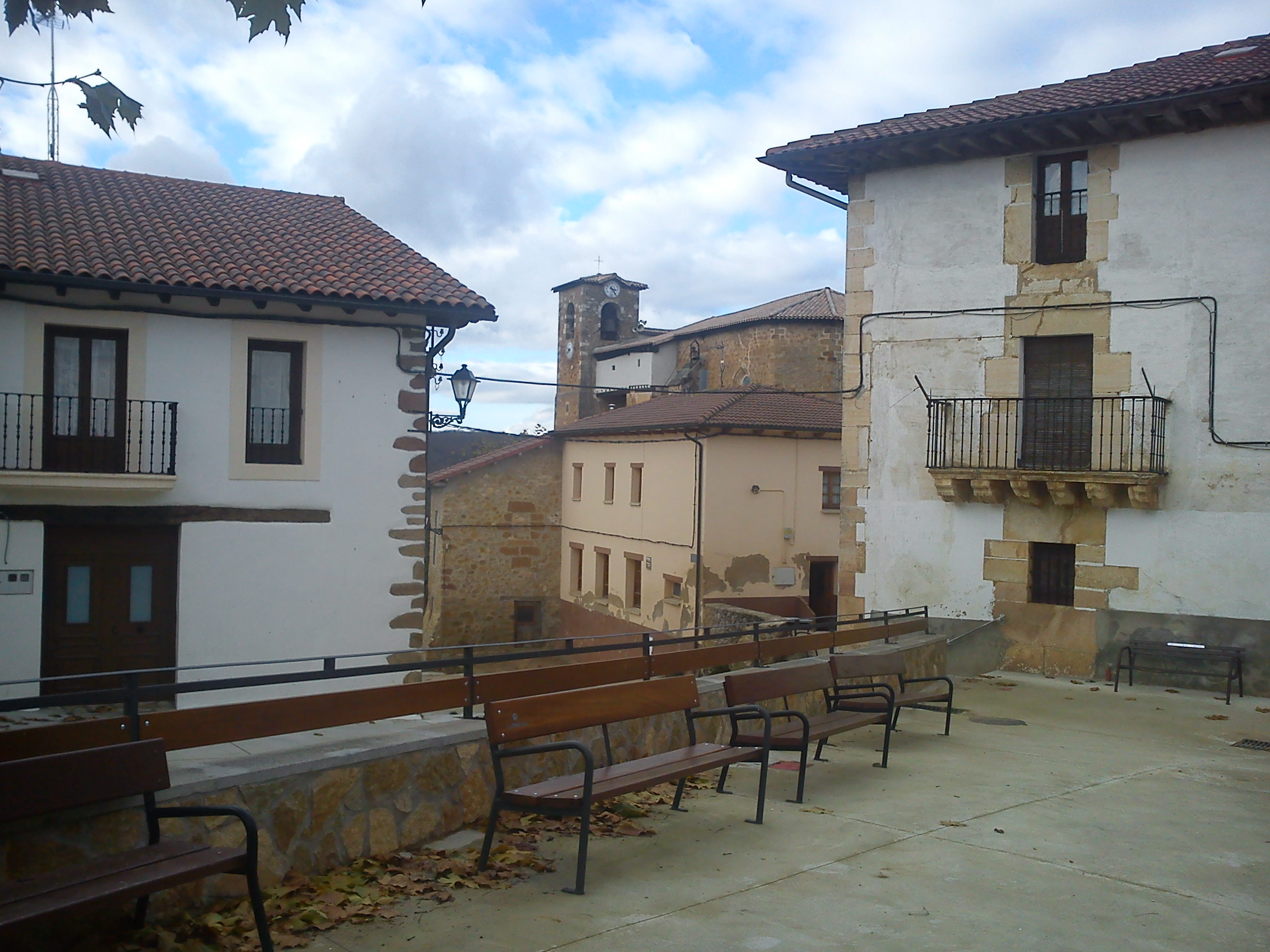

- Location within Álava Location within the Basque Country Location within Spain
- Coordinates: 42°39′31″N 2°28′38″W
- Country: Spain
- Autonomous community: Basque Country
- Province: Álava
- Comarca: Montaña Alavesa
- Municipality: Bernedo

Area
  - Total: 12.74 km^{2} (4.92 sq mi)
- Elevation: 739 m (2,425 ft)

Population (2022)
  - Total: 24
  - Density: 1.9/km^{2} (4.9/sq mi)
- Postal code: 01128

Quintana (Basque: Kinta) is a hamlet and concejo located in the municipality of Bernedo, in Álava province, Basque Country, Spain. It was an independent municipality until 1965, when it was merged into Bernedo.
