= Urturi =

Hamlet in Álava, Spain

- Concejo
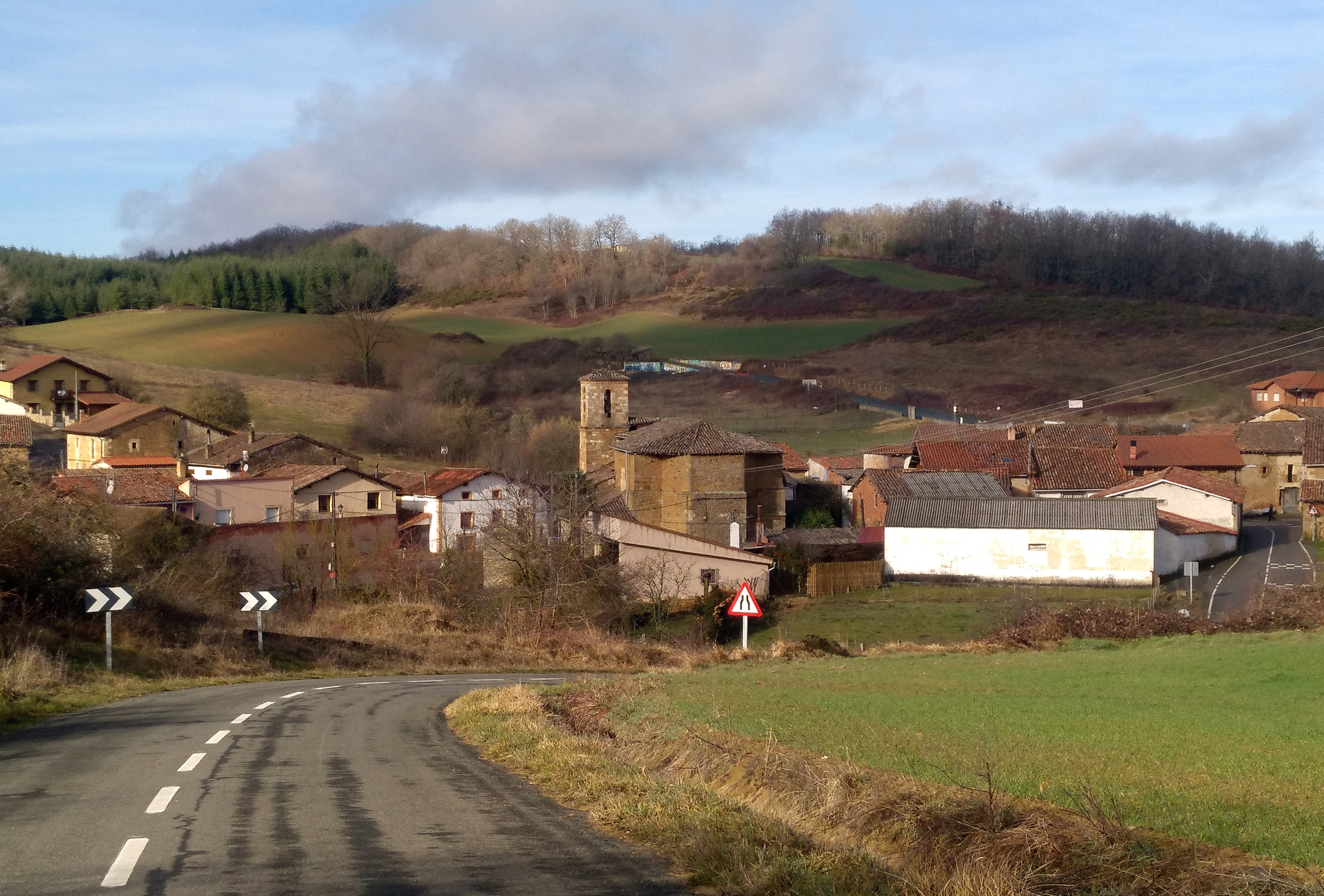
- View of Urturi

- Coat of arms

- Location within Álava Location within the Basque Country Location within Spain
- Coordinates: 42°39′24″N 2°30′24″W
- Country: Spain
- Autonomous community: Basque Country
- Province: Álava
- Comarca: Montaña Alavesa
- Municipality: Bernedo

Area
  - Total: 8.71 km^{2} (3.36 sq mi)
- Elevation: 775 m (2,543 ft)

Population (2023)
  - Total: 62
  - Density: 7.1/km^{2} (18/sq mi)
- Postal code: 01118

Urturi is a hamlet and concejo in the municipality of Bernedo, in Álava province, Basque Country, Spain.
