= Sabando =

Hamlet in Álava, Spain

- Concejo
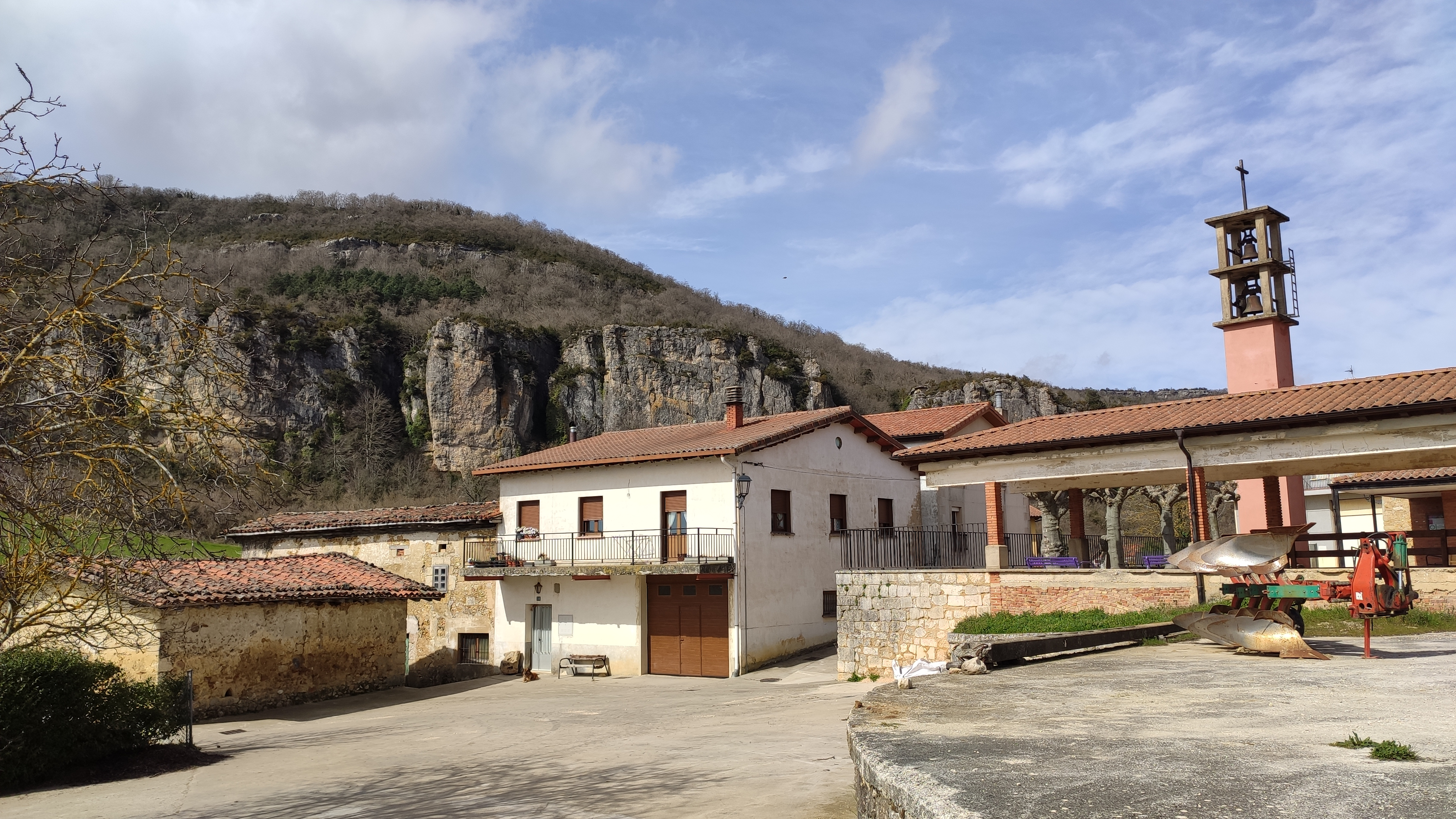

- Location within Álava Location within the Basque Country Location within Spain
- Coordinates: 42°45′N 2°24′W
- Country: Spain
- Autonomous community: Basque Country
- Province: Álava
- Comarca: Montaña Alavesa
- Municipality: Arraia-Maeztu

Area
  - Total: 8.89 km^{2} (3.43 sq mi)
- Elevation: 781 m (2,562 ft)

Population (2023)
  - Total: 49
  - Density: 5.5/km^{2} (14/sq mi)
- Postal code: 01129

Sabando is a hamlet and concejo in the municipality of Arraia-Maeztu, in Álava province, Basque Country, Spain.
