= Okina, Álava =

Village in the Spanish Basque Country

Coordinates: 42.7625°N 2.5872°W

Okina (Spanish: Oquina) is a village of the municipality of Bernedo, in the province of Álava in the Basque Country of Spain, situated about 15 kilometres (9.3 mi) from Vitoria-Gasteiz. Its population as of 2014 is 29.

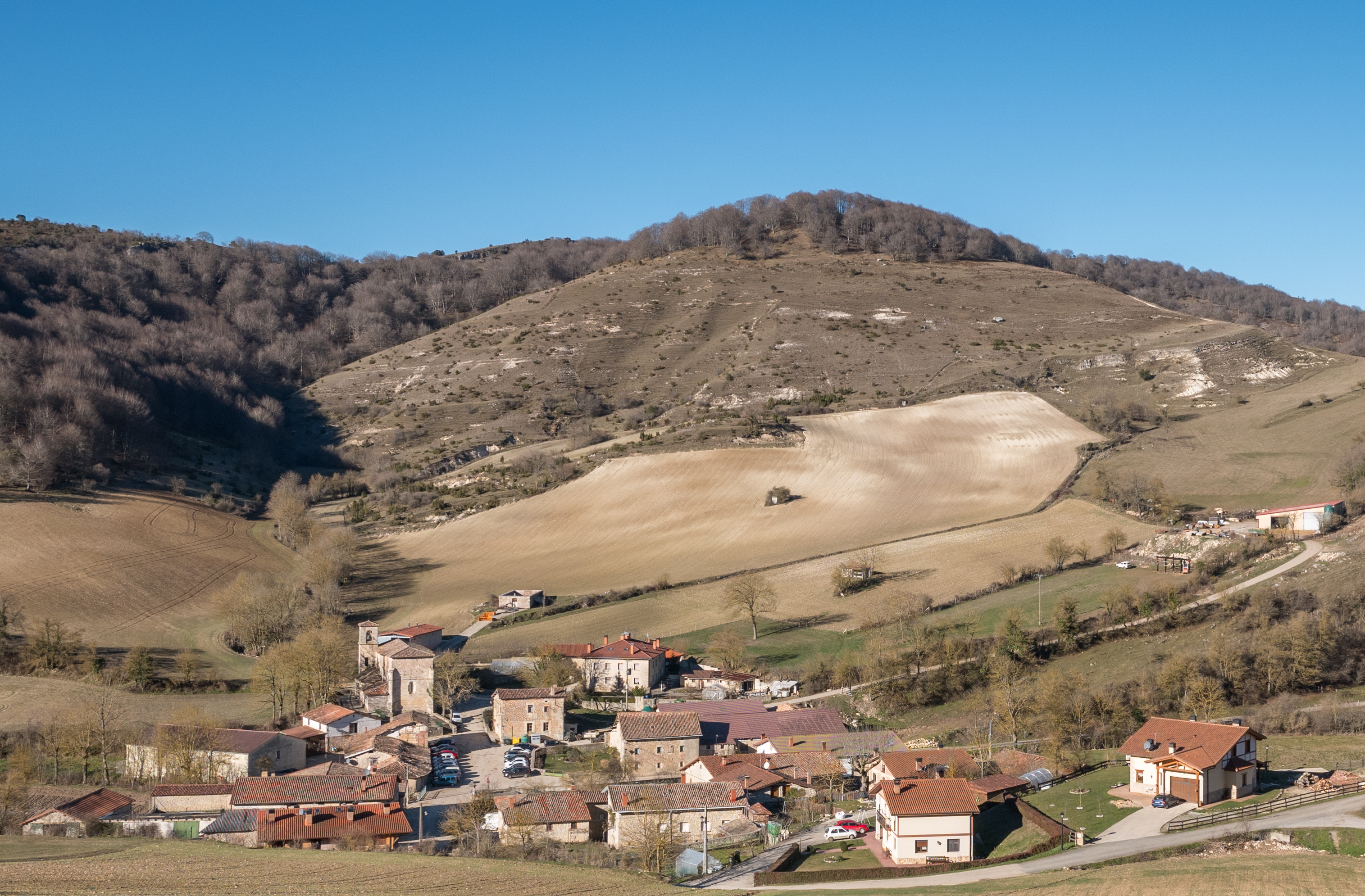
View of Okina

== Location ==
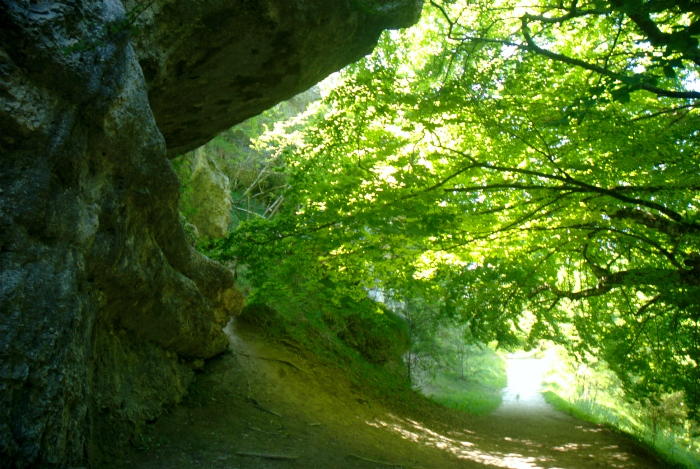
Woodland close to Okina, on the road to Saseta

Okina is situated at an altitude of 794 metres (2,605 ft) in the northwest of the municipality, in a valley in the southeastern foothills of the Vitoria Hills. The River Ayuda (a tributary of the Zadorra) passes through Okina and flows towards Sáseta through the scenic Okina gorge, on the GR-38 long-distance path and much visited by walkers from Vitoria. The village is a starting point for a walk up to the peak of Kapildui, which reaches 1,177 m (3,862 ft), and local cyclists often ride over the pass of Puerto de Okina, by which Okina is reached from Ullibarri de los Olleros.

== Name ==
The name is shown as "Okina" in the Cartulary of San Millán de la Cogolla of 1025. It is recorded as "Oquia" and "Oquina" in documentation of 1257 and 1258.

== History ==
At the beginning of the 20th century, Enrique de Eguren discovered in the outskirts of Oquina a dolmenic tumulus, after finding nearby the remains of human skeletons, pieces of ceramics, and arrowtips. In the inventory made by the abbot Mirón of the property of the monastery of San Martín de Albelda in the late 11th century, it is explicitly stated that King Sancho IV of Pamplona granted the church of Santa María of Okina with all its belongings to this monastery in 1073. Later developing into a village, it constituted a royal fraternity of the "cuadrilla" of Vitoria. This Fraternity consisted only of Okina village, and was represented in the provincial assemblies by the procurator of Vitoria. It was governed by an ordinary mayor, his assistant and a councillor.

== Monuments ==
=== Church of the Assumption of Our Lady ===
This church possesses an early Gothic portal from the 13th century, as well as a small altarpiece. It was rebuilt in the 18th century, although it retains elements of the original late-16th-century structure. The tower, square in plan, consists of three tiers, the last of which dates to 1884. The interior is rectangular, and divided into three sections: the first of these opens on to small chapels on either side. The village contained hermitages, now vanished: San Cristóbal, San Cristóbal Zarra and San Sumate.

=== House of the Gaonas ===
This building is located beside the river, and houses a shield of the Gaona family.

== Demography ==
In 2014 Okina had a population of 39, of which 18 were men and 11 women.

== Festivals ==
The village fiesta is celebrated on 10 July in honor of St. Christopher.
