= Atauri =

Hamlet in Álava, Spain

- Concejo
- Location within Álava Location within the Basque Country Location within Spain
- Coordinates: 42°43′37″N 2°25′39″W
- Country: Spain
- Autonomous community: Basque Country
- Province: Álava
- Comarca: Montaña Alavesa
- Municipality: Arraia-Maeztu

Area
  - Total: 4.19 km^{2} (1.62 sq mi)
- Elevation: 659 m (2,162 ft)

Population (2023)
  - Total: 30
  - Density: 7.2/km^{2} (19/sq mi)
- Postal code: 01128

Atauri is a hamlet and concejo in the municipality of Arraia-Maeztu, in Álava province, Basque Country, Spain.
