= San Román de Campezo =

Hamlet in Álava, Spain

San Román de Campezo/Durruma Kanpezu
- Concejo
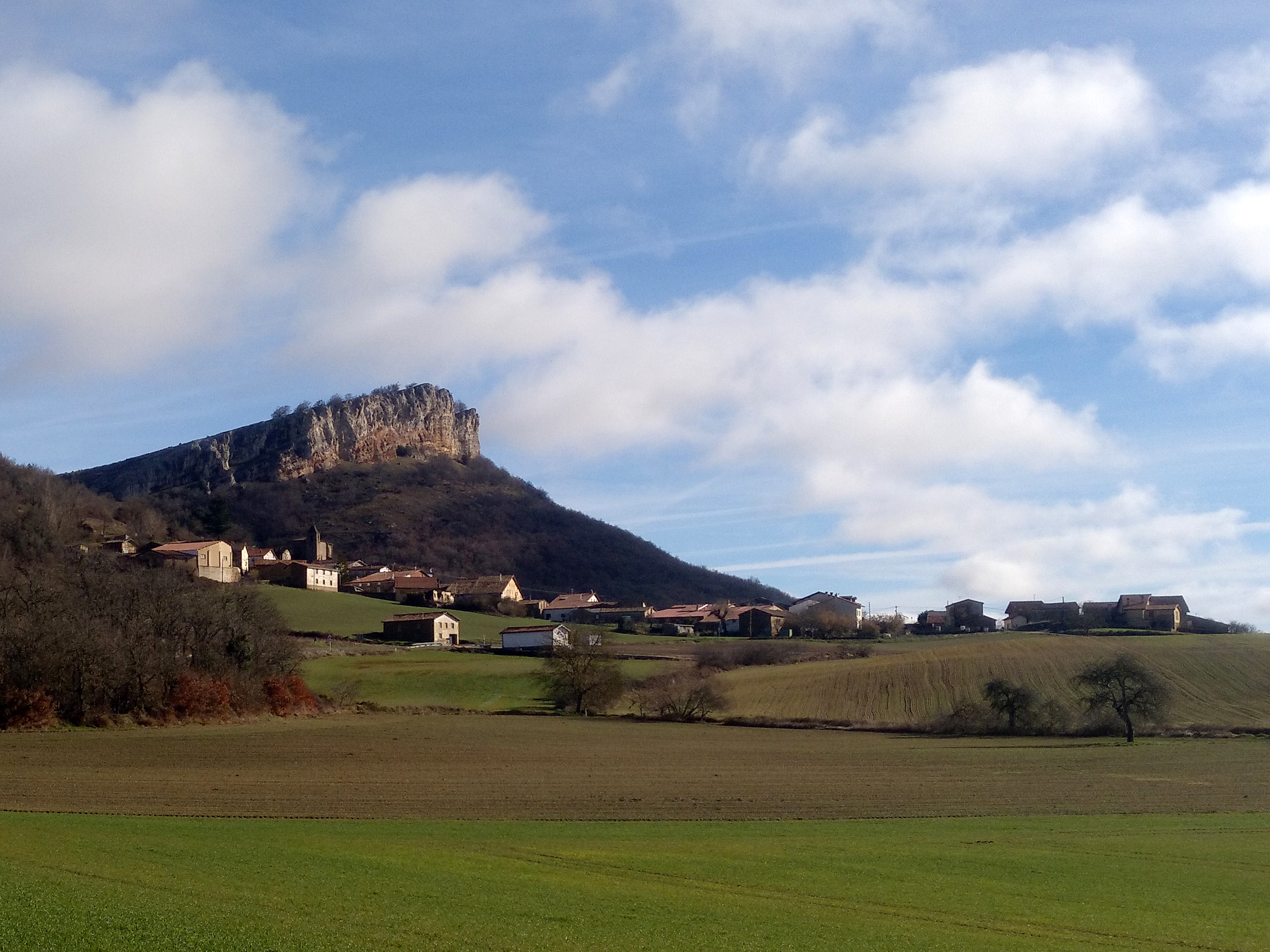
- View of San Román with Muela in the background

- Location within Álava Location within the Basque Country Location within Spain
- Coordinates: 42°40′N 2°26′W
- Country: Spain
- Autonomous community: Basque Country
- Province: Álava
- Comarca: Montaña Alavesa
- Municipality: Bernedo

Area
  - Total: 13.08 km^{2} (5.05 sq mi)
- Elevation: 836 m (2,743 ft)

Population (2023)
  - Total: 23
  - Density: 1.8/km^{2} (4.6/sq mi)
- Postal code: 01128

San Román de Campezo (Spanish pronunciation: [san romˈan de kamˈpeθo]) or Durruma Kanpezu (Basque pronunciation: [duruma kampes̻u]) is a hamlet and concejo in the municipality of Bernedo, in Álava province, Basque Country, Spain.
