= Church of Nuestra Señora de la Peña de Faido =

Church in Álava, Spain

Church of Nuestra Señora de la Peña
- Iglesia de Nuestra Señora de la Peña (Spanish); Haitzeko Andre Mariaren eliza (Basque)
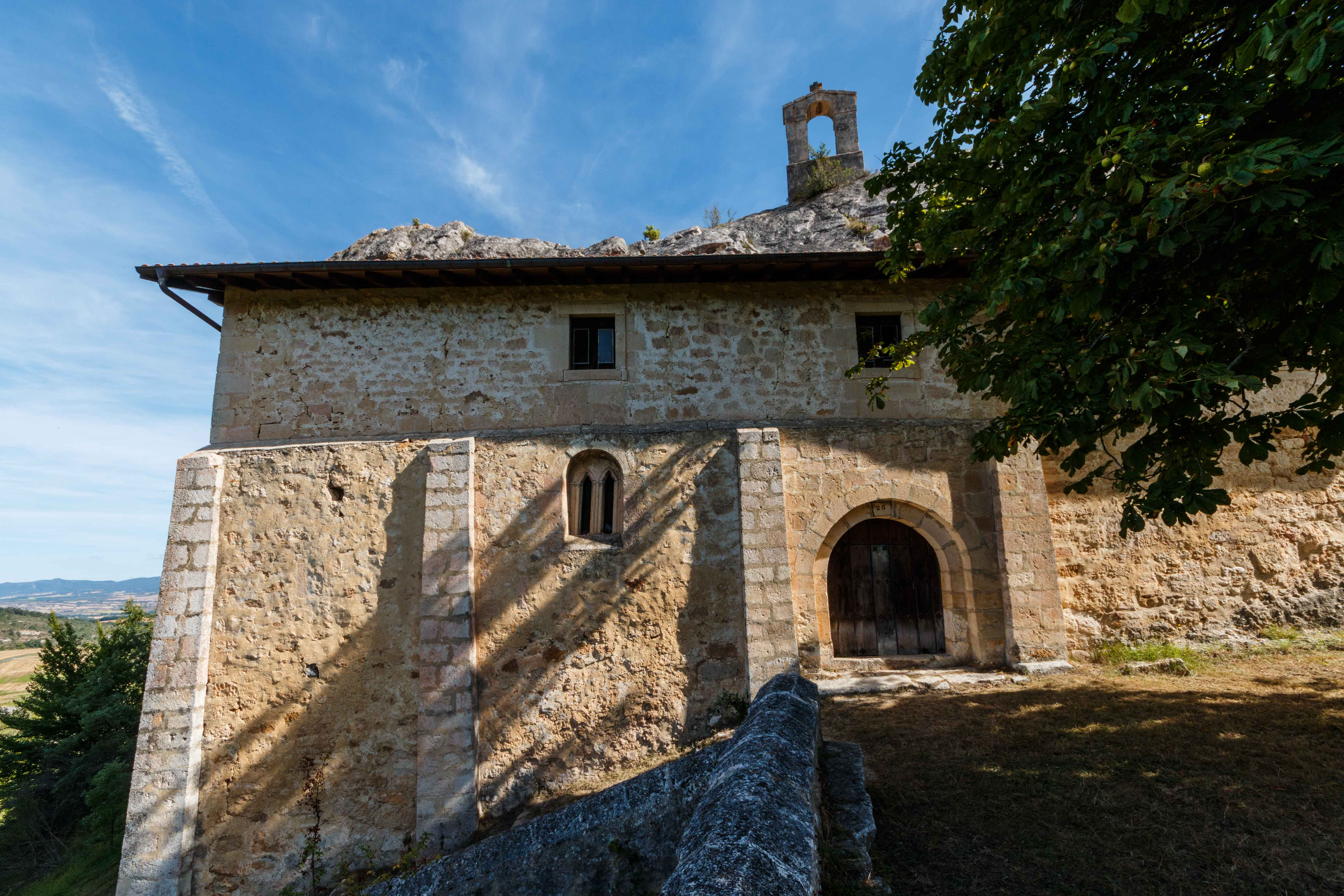
- View of the church
- 42.66509°N 2.65422°W
- Location: Faido, Peñacerrada, Álava, Basque Country
- Country: Spain
- Denomination: Catholic Church
- Tradition: Latin Church

Administration
- Archdiocese: Archidiocese of Burgos
- Diocese: Diocese of Vitoria

Spanish Cultural Heritage
- Official name: Iglesia de Nuestra Señora de la Peña de Faido
- Type: Non-movable
- Criteria: Monument
- Designated: 1984
- Reference no.: RI-51-0005107

The Church of Nuestra Señora de la Peña de Faido (Spanish: Iglesia de Nuestra Señora de la Peña de Faido, Basque: Faiduko Haitzeko Andra Mariaren eliza) is a church in Faido, Peñacerrada-Urizaharra, Basque Country, Spain. It was declared Bien de Interés Cultural in 1984 and Monument by the Basque Government in 2003. The church is partially located in an artificial cave.
