= Harana/Valle de Arana =

Municipality in Spain

- Municipality
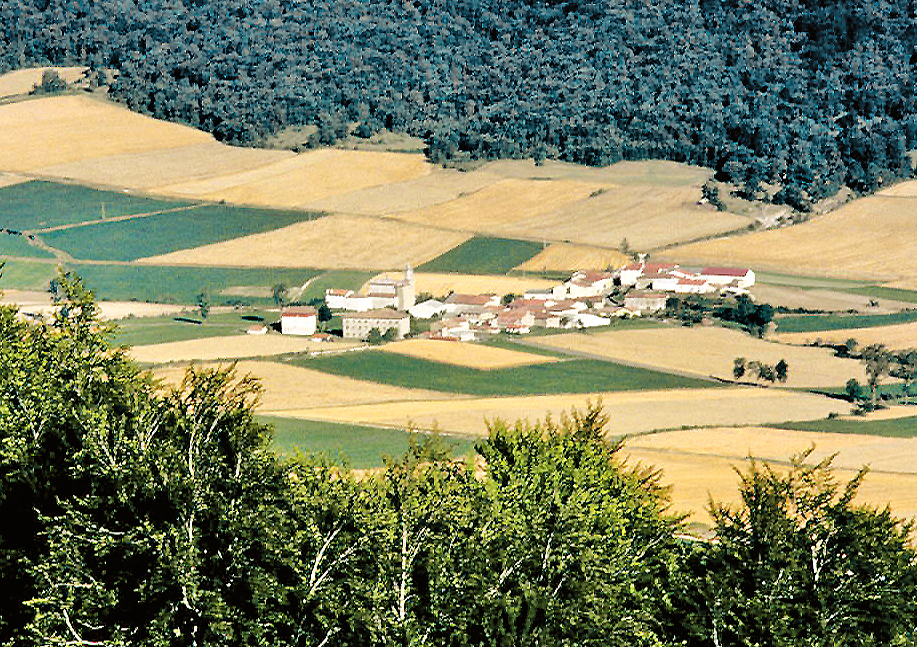
- View of Alda

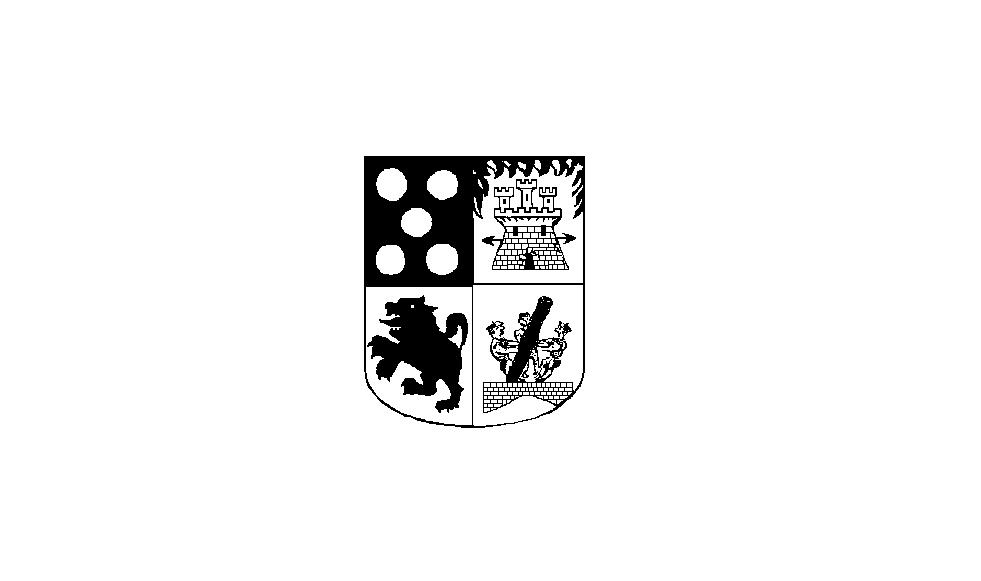
- Flag Coat of arms

- Location within the Basque Country
- Coordinates: 42°45′24″N 2°19′14″W
- Country: Spain
- Autonomous community: Basque Country
- Province: Álava
- Comarca: Montaña Alavesa

Government
  - Mayor: Rosa María Ibarrondo Manzanos (EAJ/PNV)

Area
  - Total: 39.12 km^{2} (15.10 sq mi)
- Elevation: 816 m (2,677 ft)

Population (2025-01-01)
  - Total: 212
  - Density: 5.42/km^{2} (14.0/sq mi)
- Time zone: UTC+1 (CET)
  - Summer (DST): UTC+2 (CEST)
- Postal code: 01117
- Official language(s): Basque; Spanish
- Website: Official website

Harana (Basque pronunciation: [aɾana]) or Valle de Arana (Spanish pronunciation: [ˈbaʝe ðe aˈɾana]) is a municipality located in the province of Álava, in the Basque Country, northern Spain. Its capital is the village of Alda.

== Geography ==
=== Administrative subdivisions ===
The municipality is divided into 4 villages, all of them organized as concejos.

Official name	Basque name	Spanish name	Population (2021)	Area (km^{2})
Alda	Alda	Alda	29	6.08
Kontrasta	Kontrasta	Contrasta	52	13.68
San Vicente de Arana/Done Bikendi Harana	Done Bikendi Harana	San Vicente de Arana	104	9.30
Ullíbarri-Arana/Uribarri Harana	Ullíbarri-Arana	Uribarri Harana	46	9.93
