= Markinez =

Hamlet in Álava, Spain

- Concejo
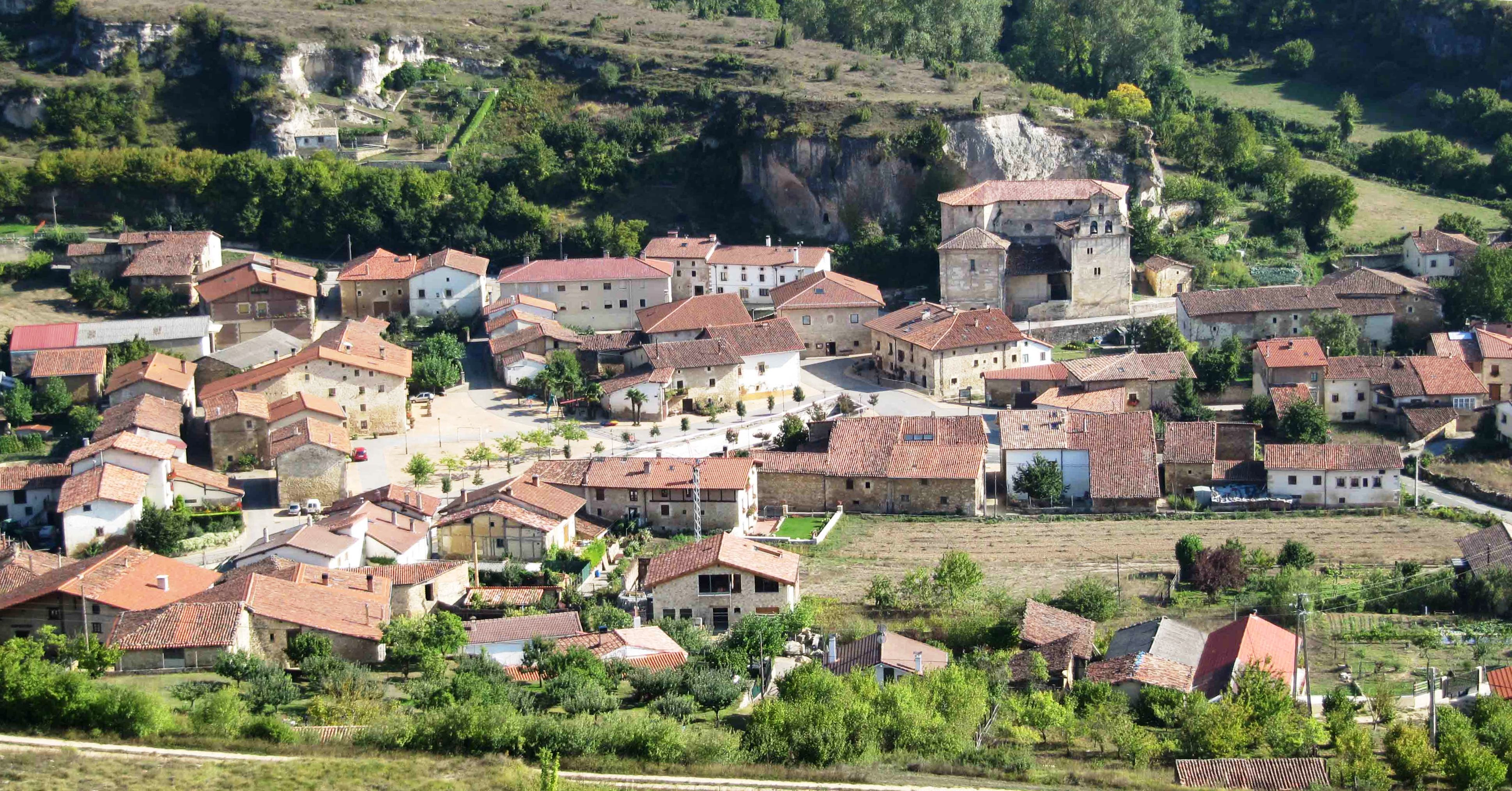

- Coat of arms

- Location within Álava Location within the Basque Country Location within Spain
- Coordinates: 42°42′09″N 2°33′51″W
- Country: Spain
- Autonomous community: Basque Country
- Province: Álava
- Comarca: Montaña Alavesa
- Municipality: Bernedo

Area
  - Total: 23.97 km^{2} (9.25 sq mi)
- Elevation: 692 m (2,270 ft)

Population (2022)
  - Total: 73
  - Density: 3.0/km^{2} (7.9/sq mi)
- Postal code: 01216

Markinez (Spanish: Marquínez, alternatively in Basque: Markiz) is a hamlet and concejo located in the municipality of Bernedo, in Álava province, Basque Country, Spain. It was an independent municipality until 1961, when it was merged with Arluzea to form Arlucea-Marquínez. In turn, this municipality was merged into Bernedo in 1976. The chapel of San Juan, located next to the hamlet, is catalogued as a bien de interés cultural.
