= Navarrete, Álava =

Hamlet in Álava, Spain

Navarrete
- Concejo
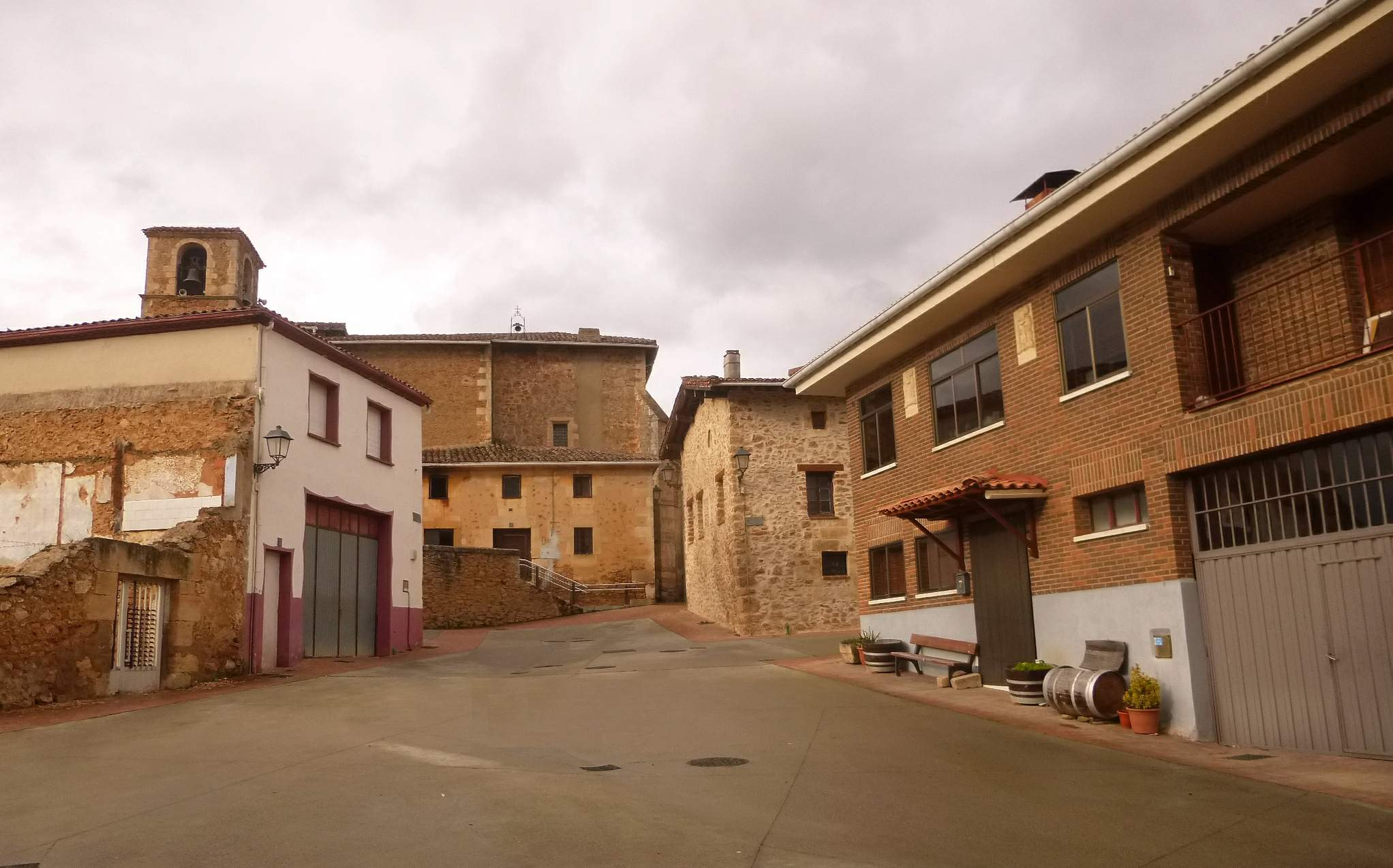

- Location within Álava Location within the Basque Country Location within Spain
- Coordinates: 42°38′14″N 2°31′30″W
- Country: Spain
- Autonomous community: Basque Country
- Province: Álava
- Comarca: Montaña Alavesa
- Municipality: Bernedo

Area
  - Total: 3.44 km^{2} (1.33 sq mi)
- Elevation: 695 m (2,280 ft)

Population (2023)
  - Total: 40
  - Density: 12/km^{2} (30/sq mi)
- Postal code: 01118

Navarrete is a hamlet and concejo in the municipality of Bernedo, in Álava province, Basque Country, Spain.
