= Pilar Unzalu =

Spanish politician (1957–2021)

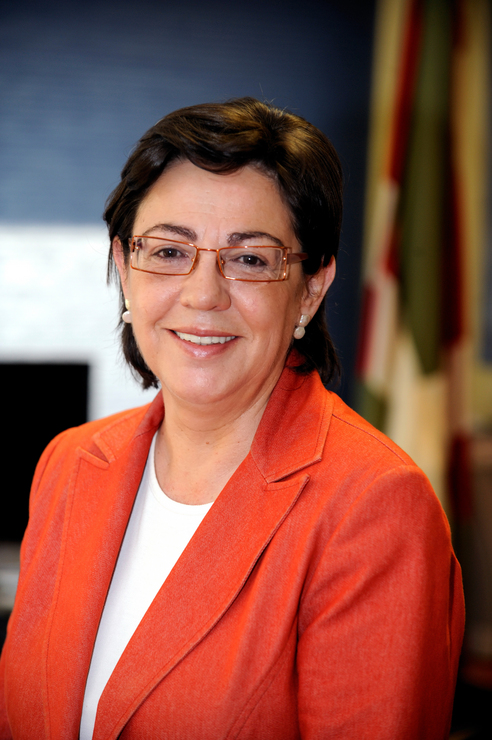
In 2009

María del Pilar Unzalu Pérez de Eulate (24 June 1957 in Iturrieta, Spain – 14 February 2021 in Vitoria-Gasteiz, Spain) was a Spanish politician.

She became member of the Basque Parliament on 23 March 2000 to occupy the vacant seat after the assassination of Fernando Buesa by ETA, office she held until 2004. Between 2004 and 2009 she was member of the Congress of Deputies, and between 2009 and 2012 was regional Minister for the Environment, Territorial Planning, Agriculture and Fisheries of the Basque Government under Patxi López's presidency. Unzalu died on 14 February 2021 in Vitoria-Gasteiz, Spain, aged 63.
