= Apellániz =

Hamlet in Álava, Spain

Apellániz/Apilaiz
- Concejo
- Location within Álava Location within the Basque Country Location within Spain
- Coordinates: 42°43′52″N 2°28′48″W
- Country: Spain
- Autonomous community: Basque Country
- Province: Álava
- Comarca: Montaña Alavesa
- Municipality: Arraia-Maeztu

Area
  - Total: 16.28 km^{2} (6.29 sq mi)
- Elevation: 735 m (2,411 ft)

Population (2023)
  - Total: 112
  - Density: 6.88/km^{2} (17.8/sq mi)
- Postal code: 01129

Apellániz (Spanish pronunciation: [apeˈʝaniθ]) or Apilaiz (Basque pronunciation: [apiʎais̻]) is a hamlet and concejo in the municipality of Arraia-Maeztu, in Álava province, Basque Country, Spain. It was an independent municipality until 1958, when it was fused with Laminoria and Arraya into the new municipality of Maestu (currently known as Arraia-Maeztu).
