= Alda, Álava =

Hamlet in Álava, Spain

Alda
- Concejo
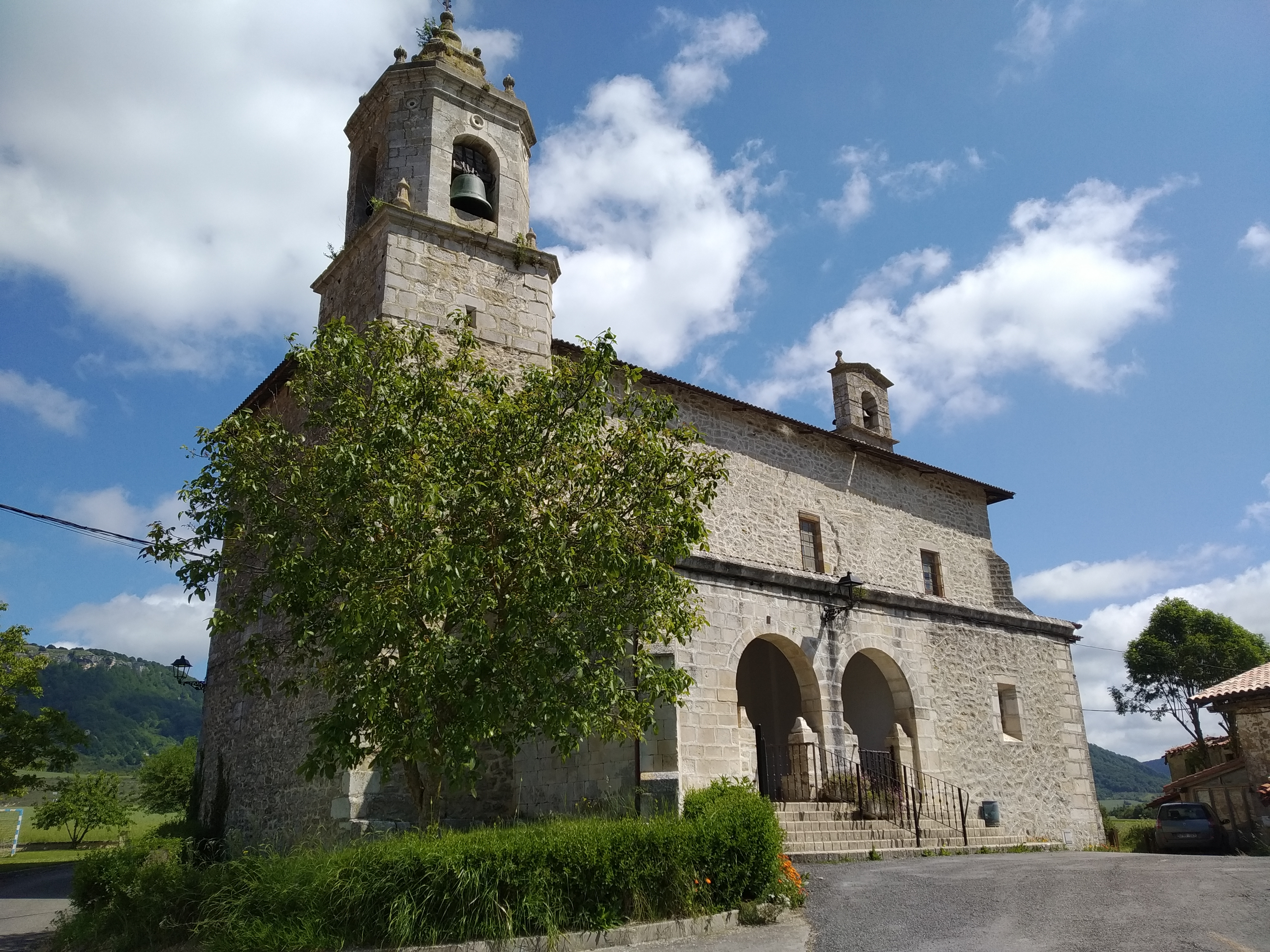
- Parish church

- Location within Álava Location within the Basque Country Location within Spain
- Coordinates: 42°45′10″N 2°19′52″W
- Country: Spain
- Autonomous community: Basque Country
- Province: Álava
- Comarca: Montaña Alavesa
- Municipality: Harana/Valle de Arana

Area
  - Total: 6.08 km^{2} (2.35 sq mi)
- Elevation: 816 m (2,677 ft)

Population (2021)
  - Total: 29
  - Density: 4.8/km^{2} (12/sq mi)
- Postal code: 01117

Alda (Basque pronunciation: [alda], Spanish pronunciation: [ˈalda]) is a hamlet and concejo located in the municipality of Harana/Valle de Arana, in Álava province, Basque Country, Spain. It is the capital of the municipality.
