= Arluzea =

Hamlet in Álava, Spain

- Concejo
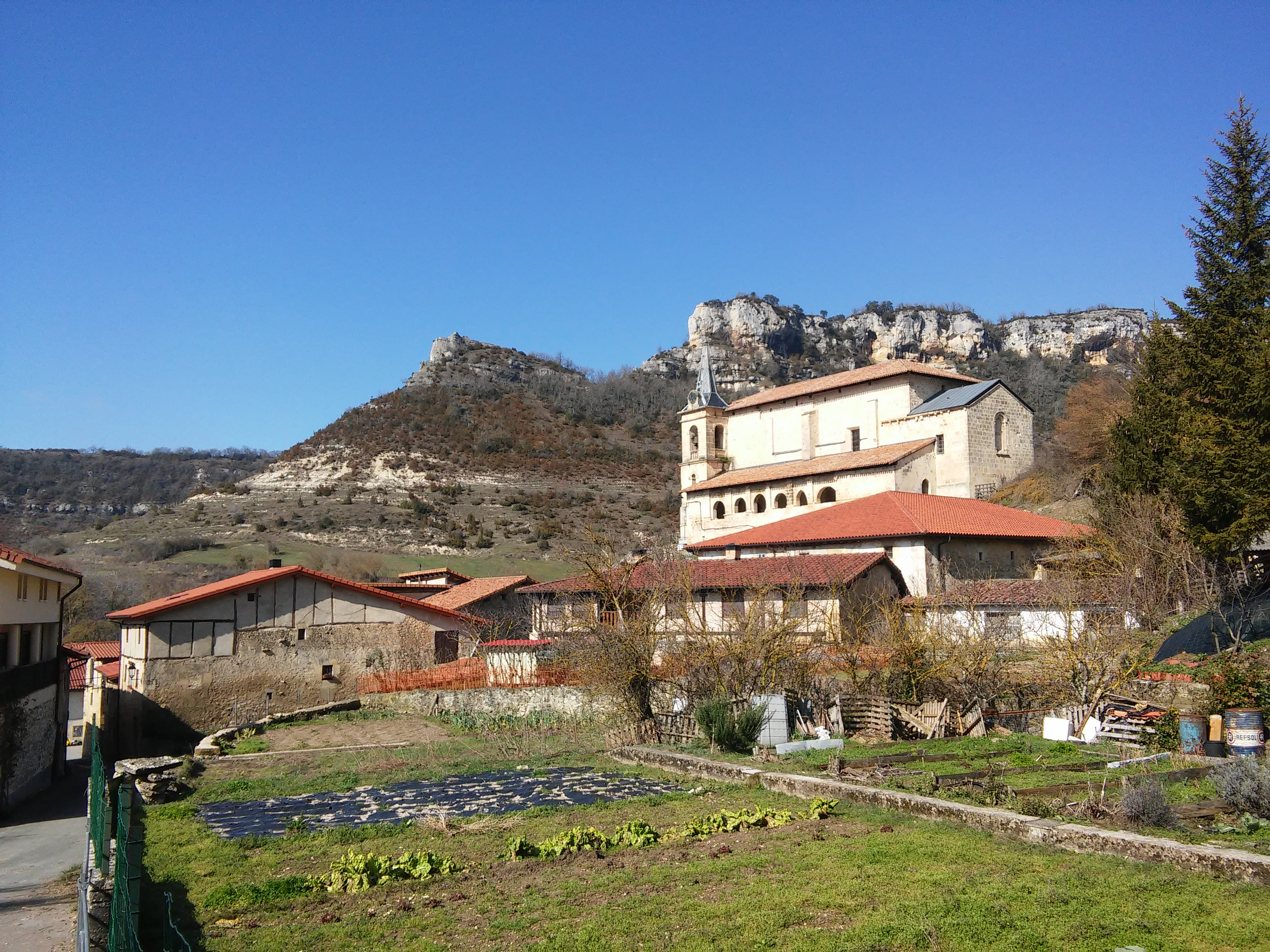

- Location within Álava Location within the Basque Country Location within Spain
- Coordinates: 42°43′38″N 2°32′35″W
- Country: Spain
- Autonomous community: Basque Country
- Province: Álava
- Comarca: Montaña Alavesa
- Municipality: Bernedo

Area
  - Total: 15.60 km^{2} (6.02 sq mi)
- Elevation: 774 m (2,539 ft)

Population (2023)
  - Total: 35
  - Density: 2.2/km^{2} (5.8/sq mi)
- Postal code: 01216

Arluzea (Spanish: Arlucea) is a hamlet and concejo in the municipality of Bernedo, in Álava province, Basque Country, Spain. It was an independent municipality until 1961, when it was merged with Markinez to form Arlucea-Marquínez. In turn, this municipality was merged into Bernedo in 1976.
