= Vírgala Mayor =

Hamlet in Álava, Spain

Vírgala Mayor/Birgaragoien
- Concejo
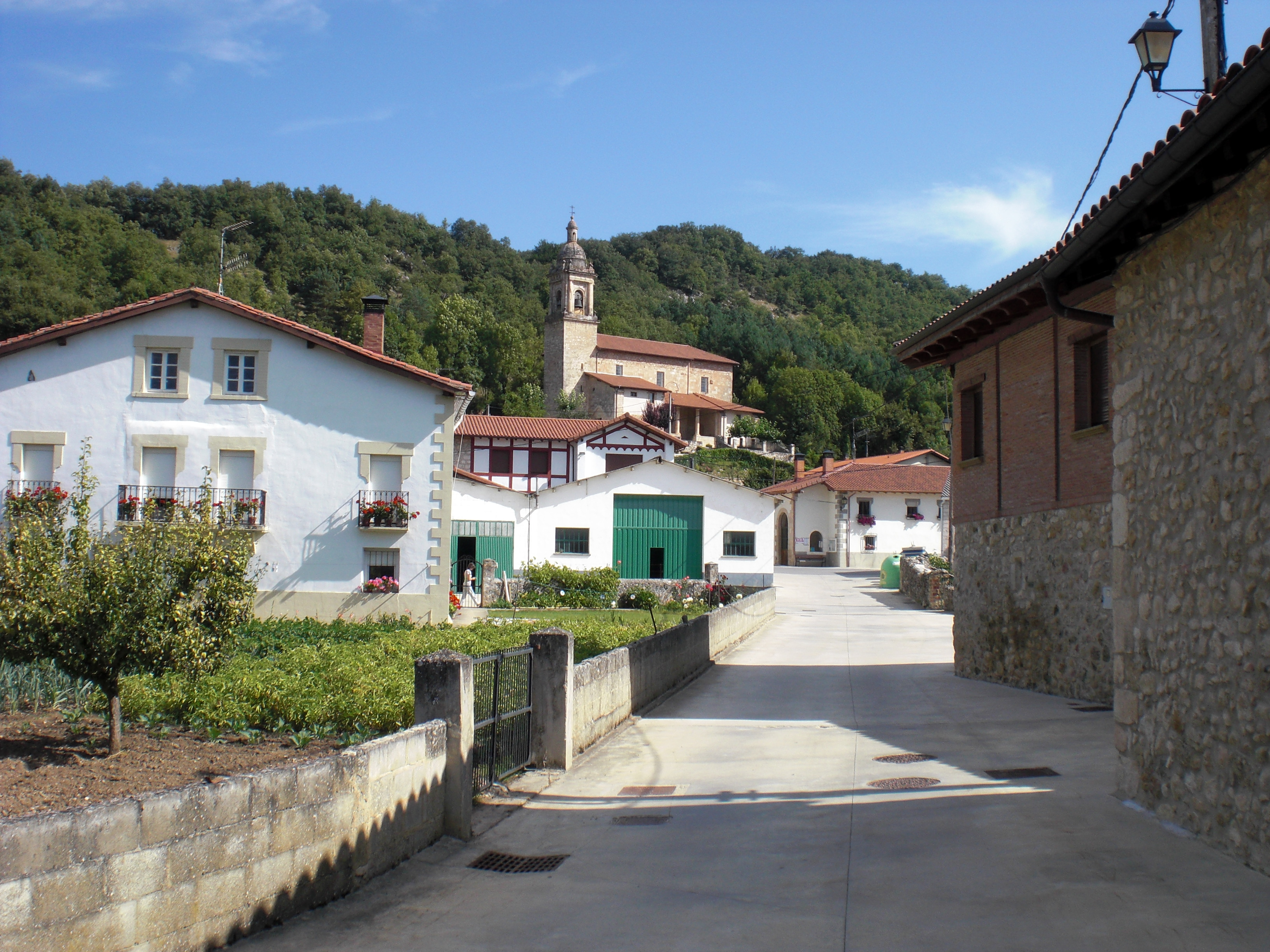

- Location within Álava Location within the Basque Country Location within Spain
- Coordinates: 42°45′13″N 2°28′29″W
- Country: Spain
- Autonomous community: Basque Country
- Province: Álava
- Comarca: Montaña Alavesa
- Municipality: Arraia-Maeztu

Area
  - Total: 12.16 km^{2} (4.70 sq mi)
- Elevation: 529 m (1,736 ft)

Population (2023)
  - Total: 54
  - Density: 4.4/km^{2} (12/sq mi)
- Postal code: 01129

Vírgala Mayor (Spanish pronunciation: [ˈbiɾɣala maˈʝoɾ]) or Birgaragoien (Basque pronunciation: [birɣaraɣoi.en]) is a hamlet and concejo in the municipality of Arraia-Maeztu, Álava province, Basque Country, Spain. The hamlet of Vírgala Menor (Basque: Birgarabarren) is also part of the concejo.
