= Angostina =

Hamlet in Álava, Spain

- Concejo
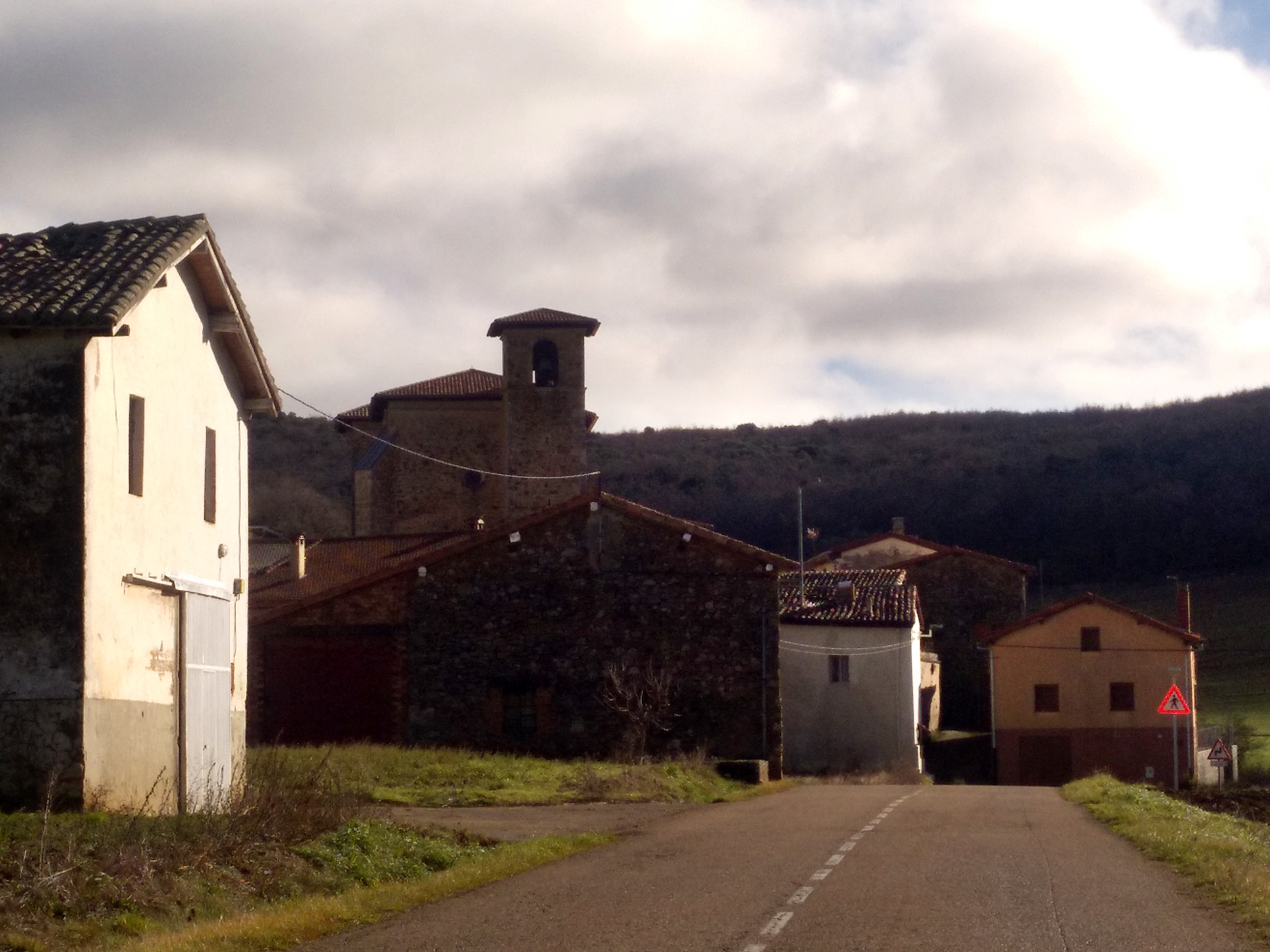
- Church of Santa Coloma

- Location within Álava Location within the Basque Country Location within Spain
- Coordinates: 42°38′07″N 2°28′10″W
- Country: Spain
- Autonomous community: Basque Country
- Province: Álava
- Comarca: Montaña Alavesa
- Municipality: Bernedo

Area
  - Total: 3.71 km^{2} (1.43 sq mi)
- Elevation: 773 m (2,536 ft)

Population (2023)
  - Total: 18
  - Density: 4.9/km^{2} (13/sq mi)
- Postal code: 01118

Angostina is a hamlet and concejo in the municipality of Bernedo, in Álava province, Basque Country, Spain.
