= Urarte =

Hamlet in Álava, Spain

- Concejo
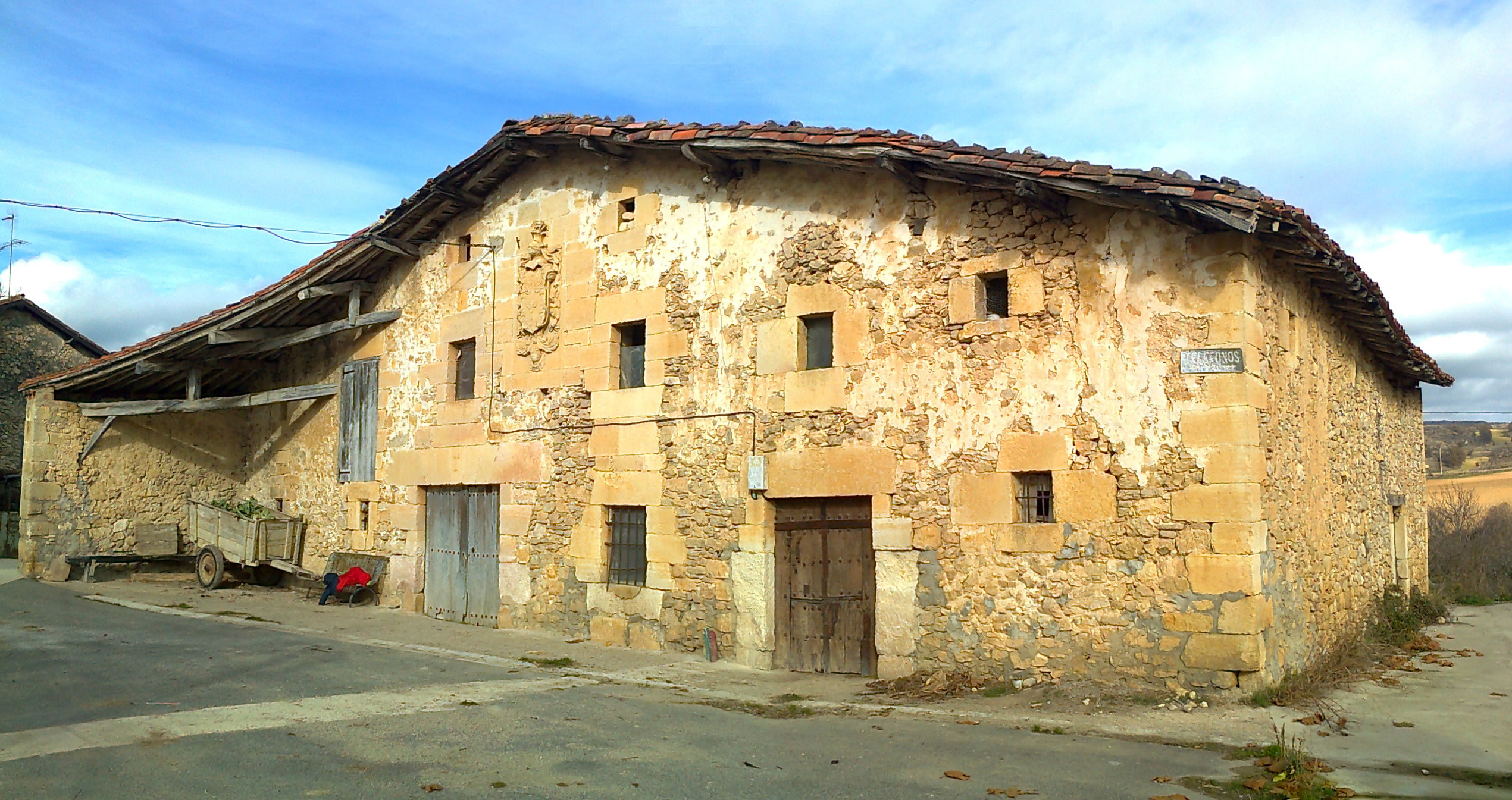
- A house in Urarte

- Coat of arms

- Location within Álava Location within the Basque Country Location within Spain
- Coordinates: 42°42′00″N 2°35′39″W
- Country: Spain
- Autonomous community: Basque Country
- Province: Álava
- Comarca: Montaña Alavesa
- Municipality: Bernedo

Area
  - Total: 12.51 km^{2} (4.83 sq mi)
- Elevation: 648 m (2,126 ft)

Population (2023)
  - Total: 39
  - Density: 3.1/km^{2} (8.1/sq mi)
- Postal code: 01216

Urarte is a hamlet and concejo in the municipality of Bernedo, in Álava province, Basque Country, Spain.
