= Maeztu =

Village in Álava, Spain

Maeztu/Maestu
- Concejo
- Location within Álava Location within the Basque Country Location within Spain
- Coordinates: 42°44′N 2°27′W
- Country: Spain
- Autonomous community: Basque Country
- Province: Álava
- Comarca: Montaña Alavesa
- Municipality: Arraia-Maeztu

Area
  - Total: 11.04 km^{2} (4.26 sq mi)
- Elevation: 658 m (2,159 ft)

Population (2023)
  - Total: 349
  - Density: 31.6/km^{2} (81.9/sq mi)
- Postal code: 01120

Maeztu (Basque pronunciation: [maes̻tu]) or Maestu (Spanish pronunciation: [maˈestu]) is a village and concejo in the municipality of Arraia-Maeztu, in Álava province, Basque Country, Spain. It is the capital of the municipality.
