= Kontrasta =

Hamlet in Álava, Spain

- Concejo
- Location within Álava Location within the Basque Country Location within Spain
- Coordinates: 42°46′N 2°17′W
- Country: Spain
- Autonomous community: Basque Country
- Province: Álava
- Comarca: Montaña Alavesa
- Municipality: Harana/Valle de Arana

Area
  - Total: 13.68 km^{2} (5.28 sq mi)
- Elevation: 828 m (2,717 ft)

Population (2021)
  - Total: 52
  - Density: 3.8/km^{2} (9.8/sq mi)
- Postal code: 01117

Kontrasta (Basque pronunciation: [kontras̺ta], Spanish: Contrasta [kon'tɾasta]) is a hamlet and concejo located in the municipality of Harana/Valle de Arana, in Álava province, Basque Country, Spain.
