= Róitegui =

Hamlet in Álava, Spain

Róitegui/Erroitegi
- Concejo
- Location within Álava Location within the Basque Country Location within Spain
- Coordinates: 42°46′45″N 2°22′59″W
- Country: Spain
- Autonomous community: Basque Country
- Province: Álava
- Comarca: Montaña Alavesa
- Municipality: Arraia-Maeztu

Area
  - Total: 4.73 km^{2} (1.83 sq mi)
- Elevation: 957 m (3,140 ft)

Population (2023)
  - Total: 26
  - Density: 5.5/km^{2} (14/sq mi)
- Postal code: 01129

Róitegui (Spanish pronunciation: [ˈrojteɣi]) or Erroitegi (Basque pronunciation: [eroiteɣi]) is a hamlet and concejo in the municipality of Arraia-Maeztu, in Álava province, Basque Country, Spain.
