= Arraia-Maeztu =

- Municipality
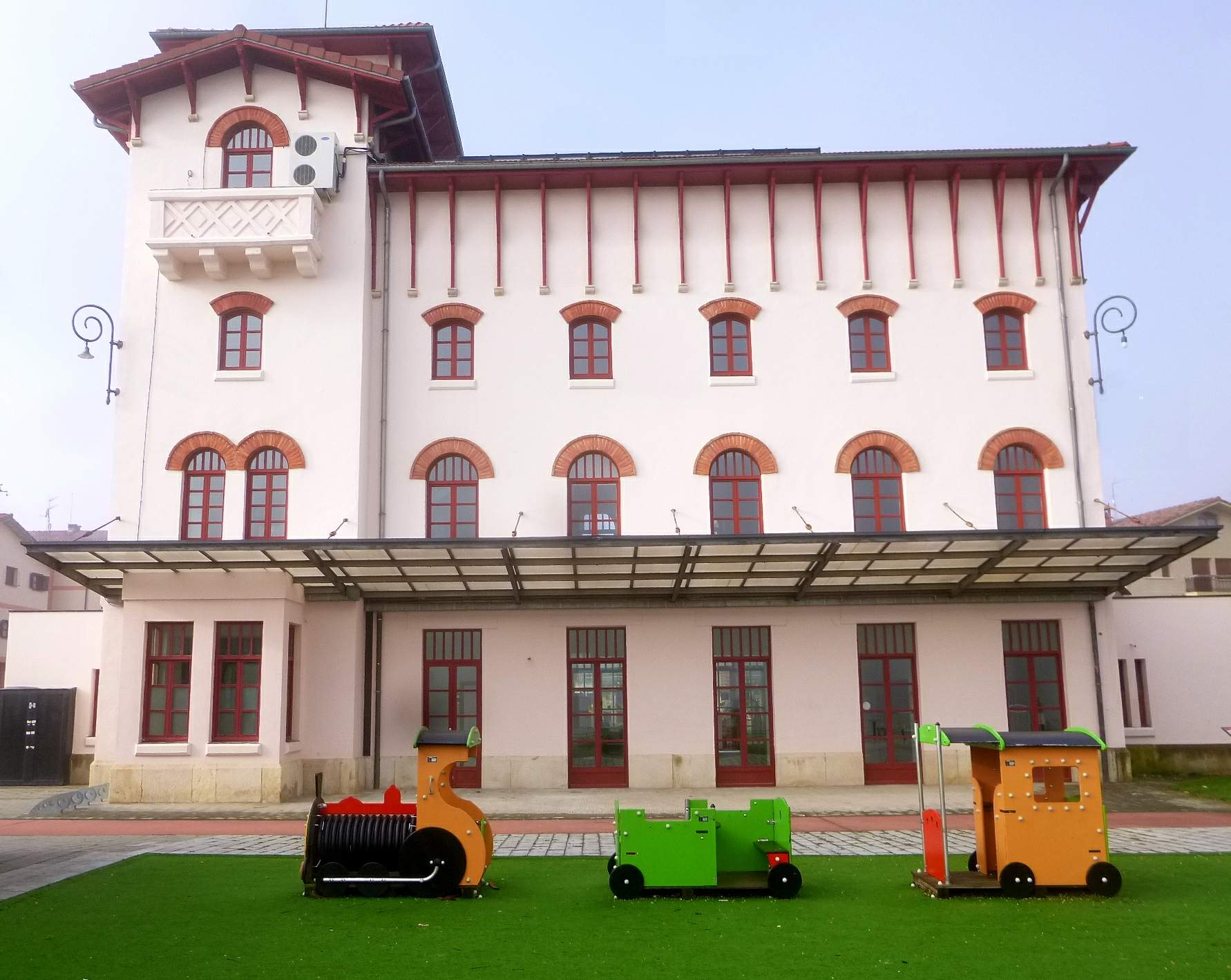
- Town hall

- Coat of arms

- Location of Alegría-Dulantzi within the Basque Country
- Coordinates: 42°44′26″N 2°26′46″W
- Country: Spain
- Autonomous community: Basque Country
- Province: Álava
- Comarca: Montaña Alavesa

Government
  - Mayor: Anartz Gorrotxategi Elorriaga (EAJ/PNV)

Area
  - Total: 123.11 km^{2} (47.53 sq mi)
- Elevation: 658 m (2,159 ft)

Population (2025-01-01)
  - Total: 812
  - Density: 6.60/km^{2} (17.1/sq mi)
- Time zone: UTC+1 (CET)
  - Summer (DST): UTC+2 (CEST)
- Postal code: 01120, 01128, 01129
- Official language(s): Basque; Spanish
- Website: Official website

Arraia-Maeztu (Basque pronunciation: [arai.a maes̻tu], Spanish: Arraya-Maestu [aˈraʝa maˈestu]), is a municipality located in the province of Álava, in the Basque Country, northern Spain.

This municipality was formed in 1958 by the merger of the municipalities of Apellániz, Arraya and Laminoria. It was originally called Maestu, but in 1987 adopted its current name.

== Geography ==
=== Administrative subdivisions ===
The municipality contains 16 villages, organized into 10 concejos.

Official name	Basque name	Spanish name	Population (2021)	Area (km^{2})	Notes
Apellániz/Apilaiz	Apilaiz	Apellániz	112	16.23	Concejo
Atauri	Atauri	Atauri	30	4.18	Concejo
Azazeta	Azazeta	Azáceta	76	7.70	Concejo
Comunidades		Comunidades	0	16.30	Agricultural common
Korres	Korres	Corres	30	13.24	Concejo
Maeztu/Maestu	Maeztu	Maestu	335	11.00	Concejo, capital of the municipality
Onraita/Erroeta	Erroeta	Onraita	18	6.52	Concejo
Real Valle de Laminoria/Laminoriako Erret Harana	Laminoriako Erret Harana	Real Valle de Laminoria	81	21.67	Concejo, composed of the following hamlets: Aletxa, Arenaza, Cicujano, Ibisate, Leorza and Musitu
Róitegui/Erroitegi	Erroitegi	Róitegui	26	4.71	Concejo
Sabando	Sabando	Sabando	43	8.86	Concejo
Vírgala Mayor/Birgaragoien	Birgaragoien	Vírgala Mayor	48	12.12	Concejo, includes the hamlet of Vírgala Menor

== Notable people ==
- Juan Bautista de Gámiz (1696–1773), Jesuit priest and poet. He wrote primarily in Spanish, but some of his poems were in Basque and are of great importance to the study of the history of the language.
