= Bernedo =

Coordinates: 42°37.6′N 2°29.85′W

- Municipality
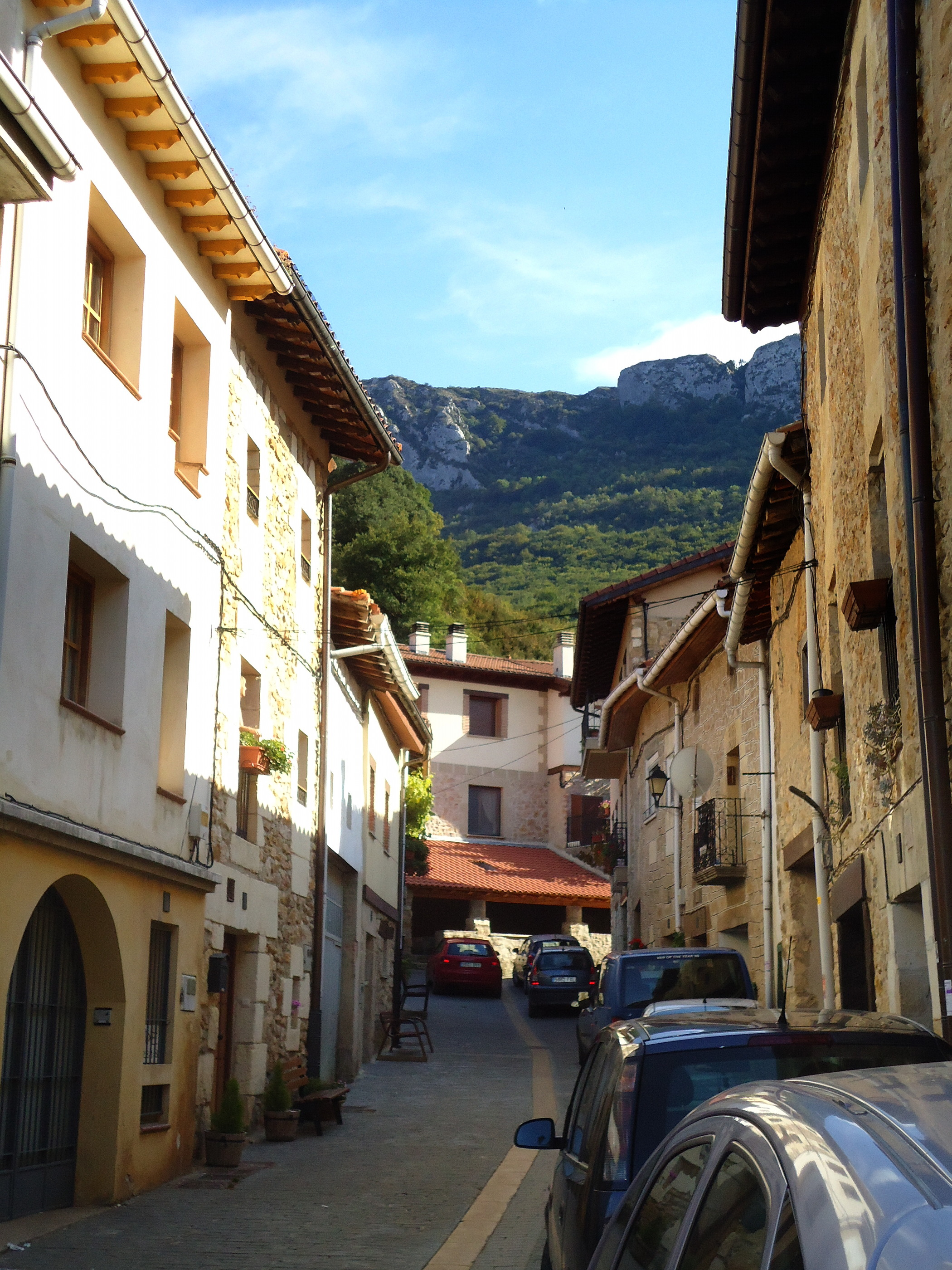
- Street of the town of Bernedo, capital of the homonymous municipality

- Coat of arms
- Interactive map of Bernedo
- Country: Spain
- Autonomous community: Basque Country
- Province: Álava

Population (2025-01-01)
  - Total: 541

Bernedo is a town and municipality located in the province of Álava, in the Basque Country, northern Spain. The town of Bernedo is considered the capital of the municipality, which consists of several towns. Over the years, the municipality of Bernedo has absorbed other, smaller municipalities, which have ceased to exist.

== History ==
The name Bernedo appeared as early as 1025 in documentation of the region of San Millán de la Cogolla. During the Middle Ages, Bernedo was a walled fortress with castle and tower. The King of Navarre, Sancho the Wise, granted charter rights for the town in the year 1182. For three centuries it was part of the Kingdom of Navarre.

It passed to the Crown of Castile in 1476, and in 1490 the Catholic Monarchs incorporated it to the city of Vitoria. Bernedo was the last populated area that was incorporated to the province of Álava.

Throughout modern history, a number of smaller municipalities have been merged into the municipality of Bernedo. In 1965, the municipalities of San Román de Campezo and Quintana were joined with Bernedo. In 1976, the municipality absorbed the short-lived municipality of Arlucea-Marquínez, which itself had been formed by a 1963 merger between the municipalities of Arlucea and Marquínez.

== Towns ==
The municipality is composed of 11 towns or villages, which are governed by town councils:

- Angostina
- Arluzea
- Bernedo, capital and main population of the municipality
- Markinez
- Navarrete
- Okina
- Quintana
- San Román de Campezo / Durruma Kanpezu
- Urarte
- Urturi
- Villafría
