= Ullíbarri de los Olleros =

Hamlet in Álava, Spain

Ullíbarri de los Olleros/Uribarri Nagusia
- Concejo
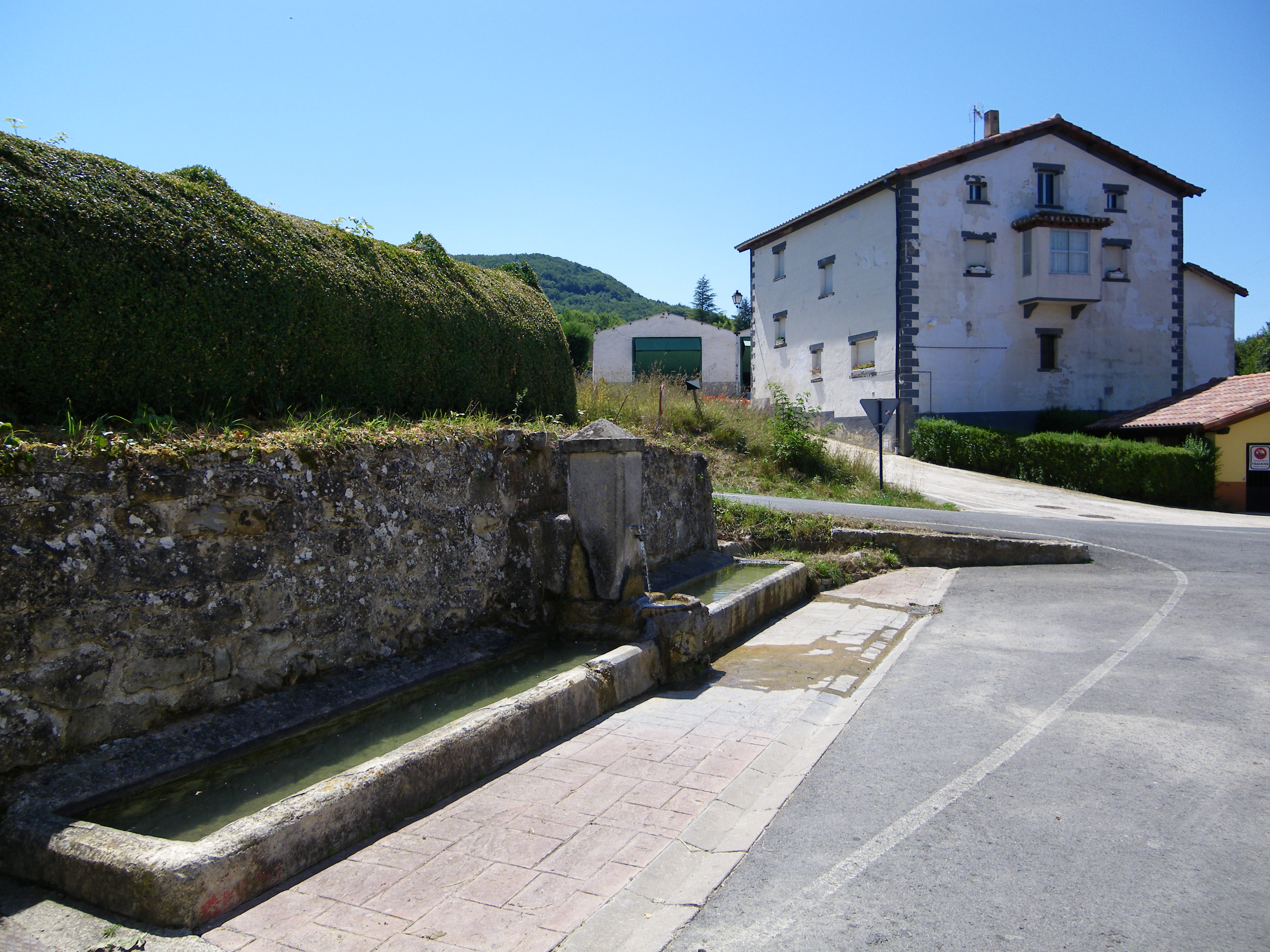

- Location within Álava Location within the Basque Country Location within Spain
- Coordinates: 42°47′42″N 2°36′16″W
- Country: Spain
- Autonomous community: Basque Country
- Province: Álava
- Comarca: Vitoria-Gasteiz
- Municipality: Vitoria-Gasteiz

Area
  - Total: 3.94 km^{2} (1.52 sq mi)
- Elevation: 644 m (2,113 ft)

Population (2024)
  - Total: 44
  - Density: 11/km^{2} (29/sq mi)
- Postal code: 01194

Ullíbarri de los Olleros (Spanish pronunciation: [uˈʝiβari ðe los oˈʝeɾos]) or Uribarri Nagusia (Basque pronunciation: [uɾiβari naɣusi.a]) is a hamlet and concejo in the municipality of Vitoria-Gasteiz, in Álava province, Basque Country, Spain.
