= Lagrán =

Municipality of Spain

- Municipality
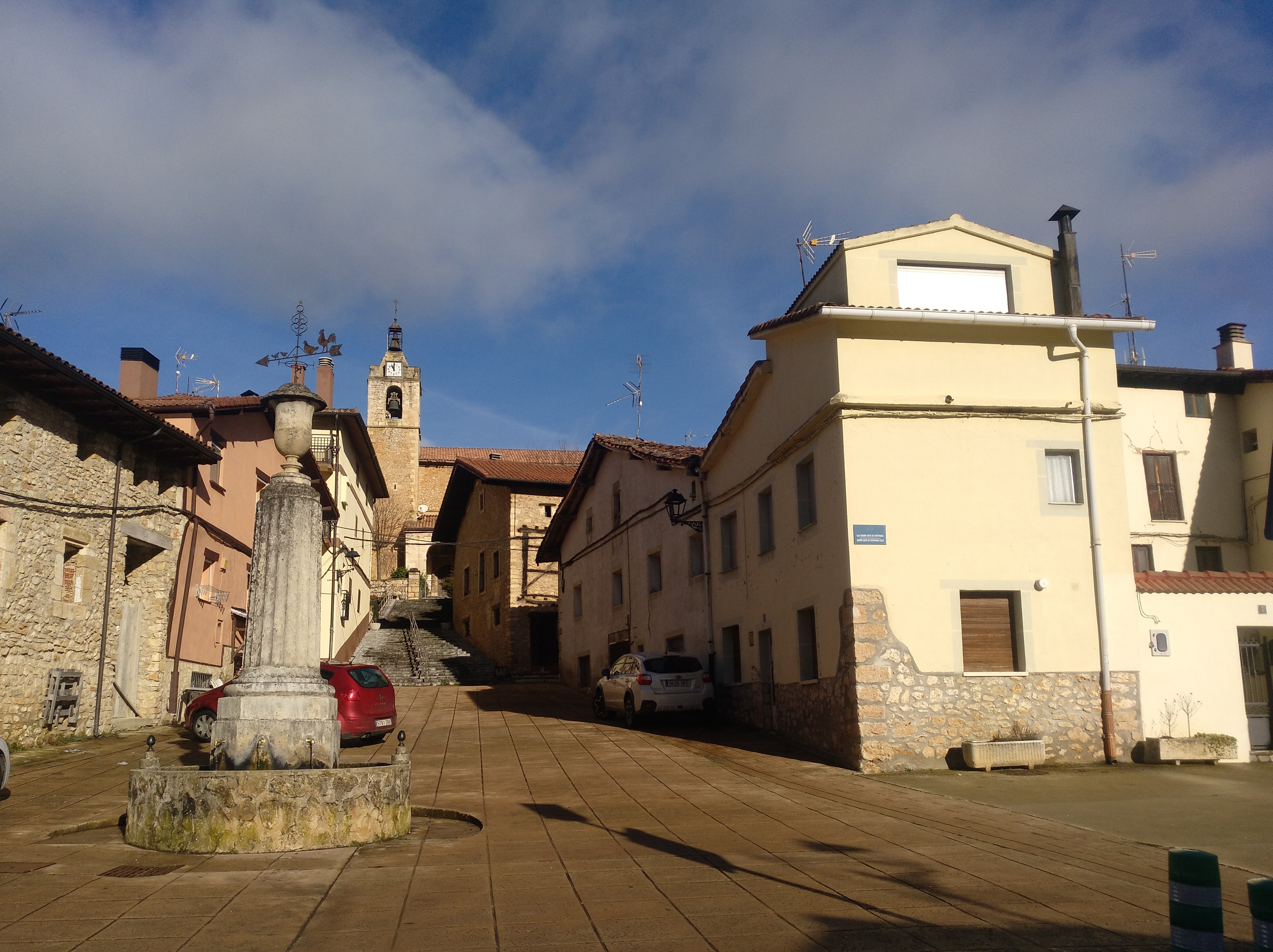

- Coat of arms

- Location of Lagrán within the Basque Country Location of Lagrán within Spain
- Coordinates: 42°38′N 2°35′W
- Country: Spain
- Autonomous Community: Basque Country
- Province: Álava
- Comarca: Montaña Alavesa

Government
  - Mayor: José María Martínez Fernández

Area
  - Total: 45.62 km^{2} (17.61 sq mi)
- Elevation (AMSL): 751 m (2,464 ft)

Population (2025-01-01)
  - Total: 177
  - Density: 3.88/km^{2} (10.0/sq mi)
- Time zone: UTC+1 (CET)
  - Summer (DST): UTC+2 (CEST (GMT +2))
- Postal code: 01118

Lagrán (Basque: Lagran) is a town and municipality located in the province of Álava, in the Basque Country, northern Spain.

Its name comes from: larra-gran which in Spanish means sobre el prado (English: above the meadow). It is located in the south part of Álava in a valley where the river Ega is born. It has an altitude of 756 m above the sea level, and near the village, at only 3 km from there, are mountains with a height of 1,400 m. There is a huge variety of species of animals and plants. In this valley potatoes and different types of cereals are grown, for commercial purposes or even for direct consumption. In the border of this valley there are several forests. There can be frequently seen hunters around this area, either major or minor hunting, because of its variety of fauna. It currently has 126 inhabitants, and it is considered to be the oldest village in Alava. Its average age is around 70 years old.

The mayor also controls another 2 towns, called Villaverde (1 km away of Lagrán) and Pipaón (7 km away of Lagrán); Lagrán is the town with the highest population of the 3. Villaverde became more famous after Eva Garcia Saenz de Urturi published the Books of the White City ("The Silence of the White City," "Water Rituals," "The Lords of Time" and "The Black Book of Hours") because it's the town of the grandfather of the author and the main character of the books.

== History ==
There is little early evidence of this village, but the first documents using the name are from 1165. It was not considered a village then. In 1515, it started to be considered as a village. In the 15th century, Lagrán was no longer an independent village when it became part of the kingdom of the Conde de Salinas and later became part of the kingdom of the Duques de Híjar.

Shield of Lagrán

== Demography ==
When we speak about the demography of this village we can say that it has become to be a small village from being a big or normal village.

== Interesting places ==
Actually the town of Lagrán has 1 café opened next to the fronton. Also there's a zone next to the Saint Bartolomew hermitage (1.6 km (1 mille) away of the town centre) in which people can camp and in summer is very used by groups of teenagers. Also it has a church called in Spanish "Iglesia de la Natividad" placed in the highest point of the town.

== Hiking ==
There are few activities, but it is possible to play bowl or play vasque fronton, cestapunta, frontennis, futsal and basketball. There are many mountains to climb or places to walk. It was able to play golf on a 9 holes course that was 1 km away from the town but it closed on 28 February 2013, so since then the nearest course to play golf is placed in Urturi, 12 km away.

Senda De Las Carboneras A-PR-50 - This path goes from Lagrán to Cruz del Castillo, before it served to communicate the Cantabrian Sea ports with the people of the Rioja and to trade with oil, bread, and wool in exchange for coal, lime, potatoes, pickled fish etc. On this path you can see three representations that explain the process of making charcoal, one of the greatest cultural treasures of the valley, and some tree species that contribute to enjoy of this walk.

Senda Del Lavadero A-PR-51 - The path which goes from the laundry of Lagrán illustrates the walker a variety of flora and fauna posters, and explanations of the valley. Can also be seen an old site where lime was fabricated and the remains of a sawmill in the mountains.

The Senda Del Monte Jaundel A-PR-52 route features artificial lakes built by farmers for livestock, as well as a mountain located between two villages that was historically used for commercial purposes. The trail includes local animal and plant species, along with a machine called "El Burro," which was previously used to transport thin wood to charcoal production sites.

Senda De Lagrán A Pipaón A-PR-53 - This path connects the two rural villages covering part of the old existing road and crossing the old lake for watering "La Salmuera" and then returning to the forest where many beeches can be found. Here are explanatory signs of different animals and plants species. You can see the remains of a clay quarry . There also will be explained by some signs how the beeches were used for commercial purposes and also an old hydroelectric generator, and at the same time you will be able to use an observatory of birds. In the village you can visit the Pipaón " Ethnographic Museum " by the Usatxi Cultural Association of Dallas.

Senda De San Bartolomé A-PR-54 - A camping area for groups, with tables, benches, barbecues and a shelter with berths, electricity, toilets, showers etc.

Senda De Lagrán A Villaverde A-PR-55 - This route shares its beginning with the Senda Del Lavadero A-PR-51, going through the Escuela de Golf (closed in February 2013) and comes to Villaverde. In it you can see posters of the vegetation in the area (beech, oak forest, oak), microfauna (rodents), raptors and other wildlife are explained.

== Feasts of Lagrán ==
- New year (1st January)
- Semana Santa
- San Bartolomé (Around the 24th of August which is the major day of this major feast)
- Day of the march (7 December)
- Christmas Eve (24 December)
- Christmas (25 December)
- New Year's Eve (31 December)
