= Onraita/Erroeta =

Hamlet in Álava, Spain

- Concejo
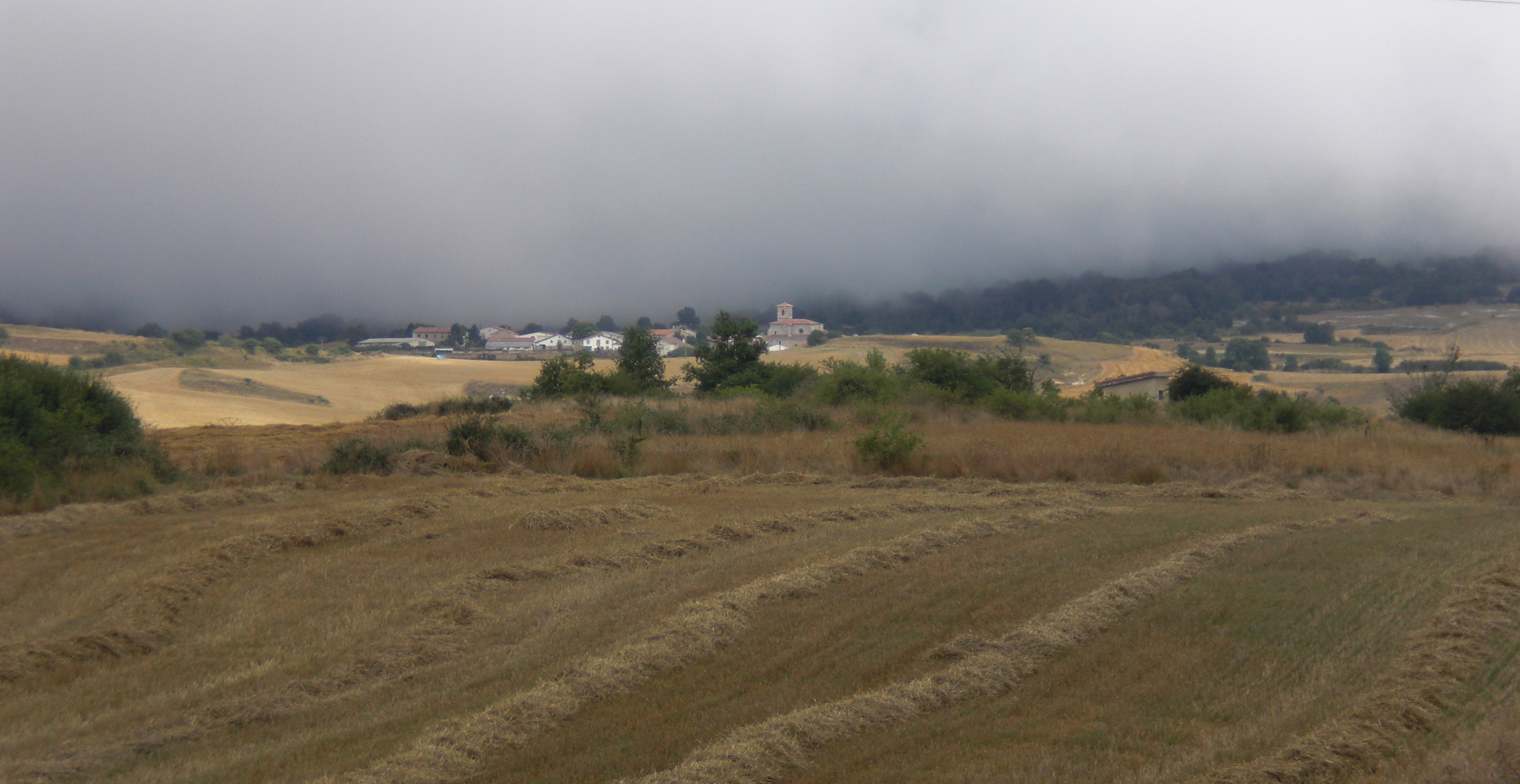

- Location within Álava Location within the Basque Country Location within Spain
- Coordinates: 42.7944°N 2.3972°W
- Country: Spain
- Autonomous community: Basque Country
- Province: Álava
- Comarca: Montaña Alavesa
- Municipality: Arraia-Maeztu

Area
  - Total: 6.54 km^{2} (2.53 sq mi)
- Elevation: 962 m (3,156 ft)

Population (2022)
  - Total: 19
  - Density: 2.9/km^{2} (7.5/sq mi)
- Postal code: 01129

Onraita (Spanish pronunciation: [onˈrajta]) or Erroeta (Basque pronunciation: [eroeta]) is a hamlet and concejo located in the municipality of Arraia-Maeztu, Álava, Basque Country, Spain. It is the highest settlement in the province of Álava.

== Toponymy ==
In the year 1025, in the Reja de San Millán, it appears as Erroheta.Other names it has had are Honrayta (1257), Onrraita (1456–1458), Hondraita (1483), Onraita - Erroeta (1986).
