= San Vicente de Arana =

Hamlet in Álava, Spain

San Vicente de Arana/Done Bikendi Harana
- Concejo
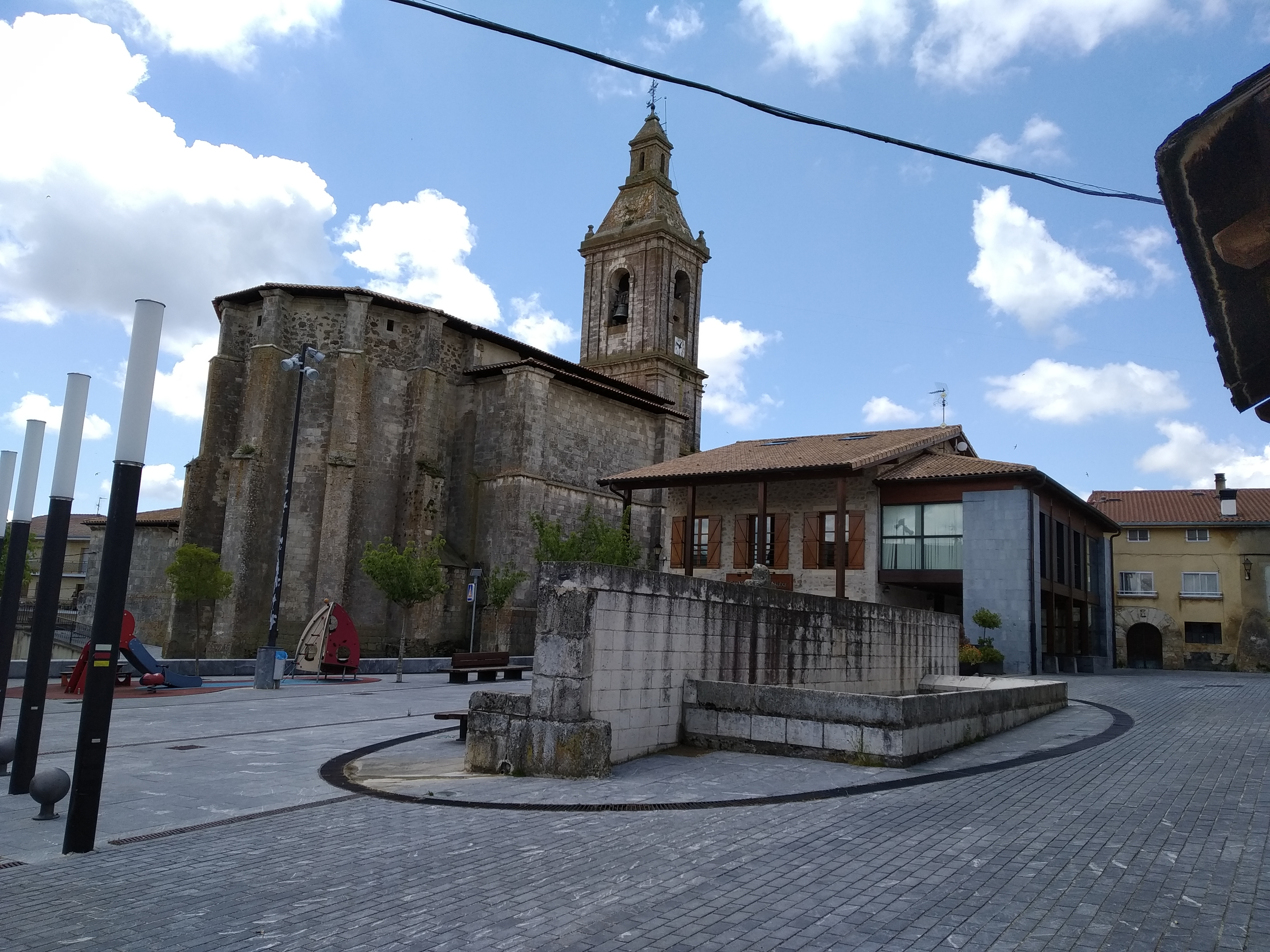
- Parish church

- Location within Álava Location within the Basque Country Location within Spain
- Coordinates: 42°44′39″N 2°21′42″W
- Country: Spain
- Autonomous community: Basque Country
- Province: Álava
- Comarca: Montaña Alavesa
- Municipality: Harana/Valle de Arana

Area
  - Total: 9.30 km^{2} (3.59 sq mi)
- Elevation: 796 m (2,612 ft)

Population (2021)
  - Total: 104
  - Density: 11.2/km^{2} (29.0/sq mi)
- Postal code: 01117

San Vicente de Arana (Spanish pronunciation: [sam biˈθente ðe aˈɾana]) or Done Bikendi Harana (Basque pronunciation: [done βikendi aɾana]) is a hamlet and concejo located in the municipality of Harana/Valle de Arana, in Álava province, Basque Country, Spain.
