= Ullíbarri-Arana =

Hamlet in Álava, Spain

Ullíbarri-Arana/Uribarri Arana
- Concejo
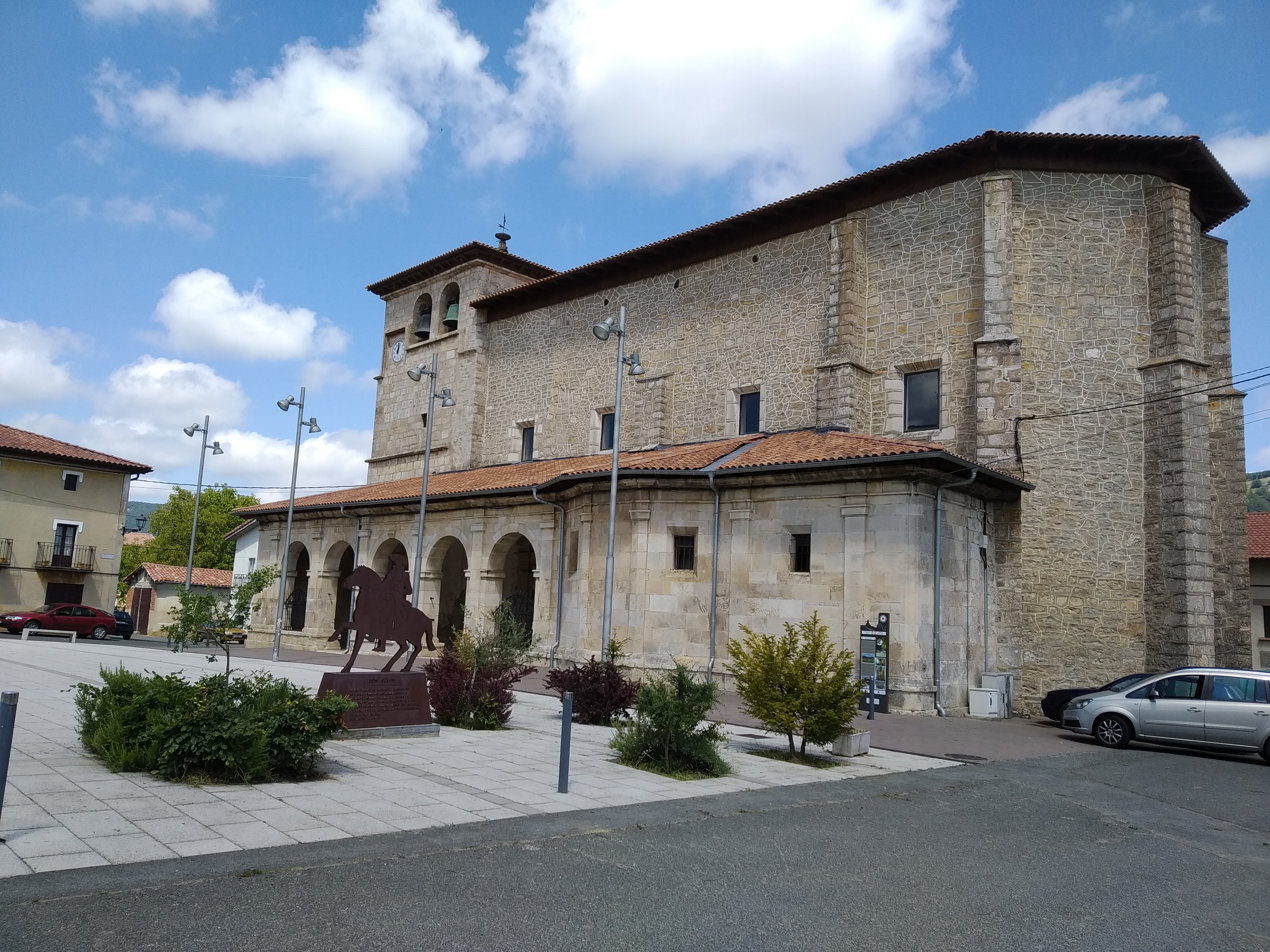
- Parish church

- Location within Álava Location within the Basque Country Location within Spain
- Coordinates: 42°45′31″N 2°19′12″W
- Country: Spain
- Autonomous community: Basque Country
- Province: Álava
- Comarca: Montaña Alavesa
- Municipality: Harana/Valle de Arana

Area
  - Total: 9.93 km^{2} (3.83 sq mi)
- Elevation: 832 m (2,730 ft)

Population (2021)
  - Total: 46
  - Density: 4.6/km^{2} (12/sq mi)
- Postal code: 01117

Ullíbarri-Arana (Spanish pronunciation: [uˈʝiβarjaˈɾana]) or Uribarri Harana (Basque pronunciation: [uɾiβari aɾana]) is a hamlet and concejo located in the municipality of Harana/Valle de Arana, in Álava province, Basque Country, Spain.
