= Peñacerrada-Urizaharra =

Coordinates: 42°38′39″N 2°42′48″W

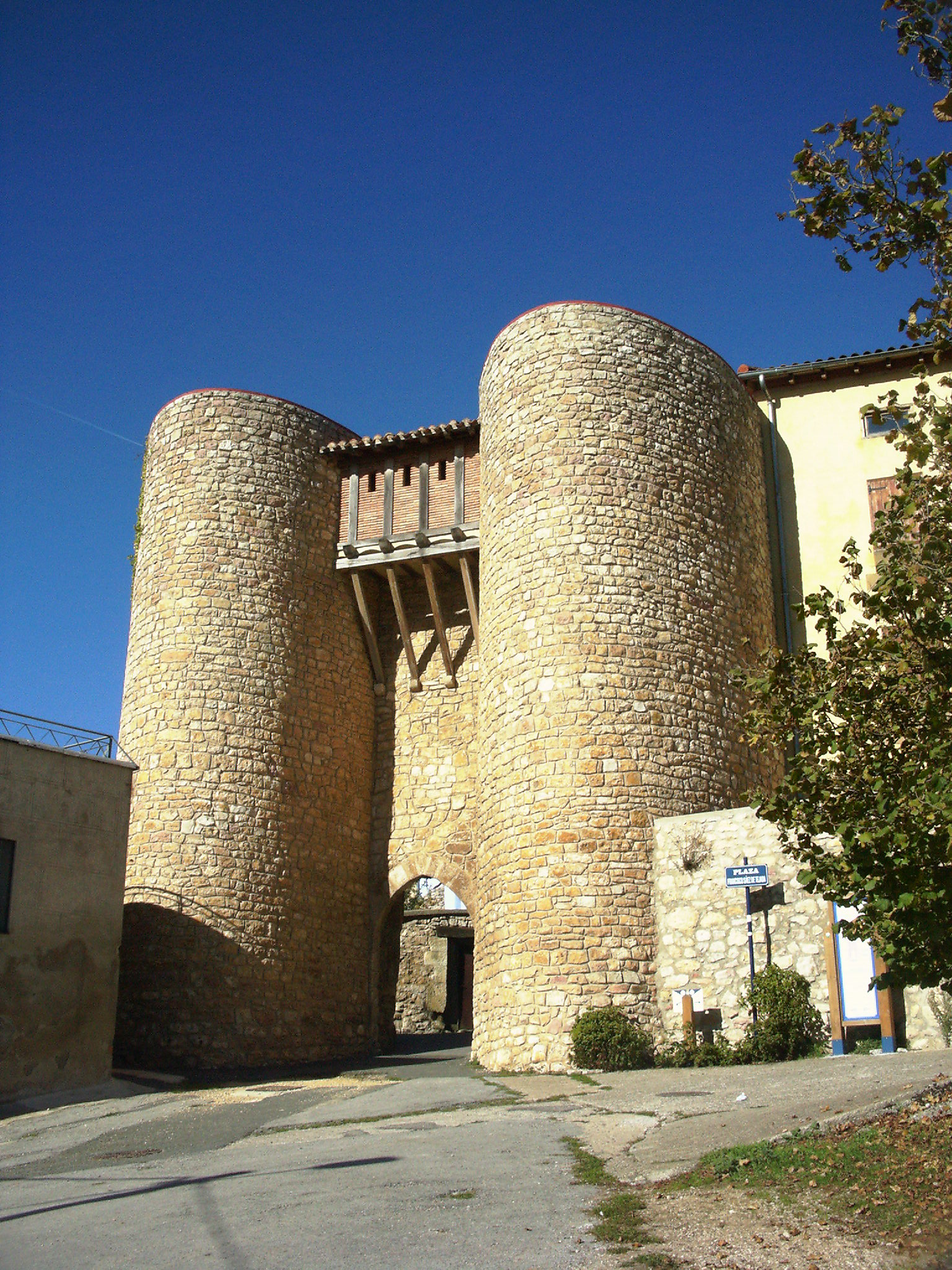
South portal of the Urizaharra wall.

Peñacerrada-Urizaharra's coat of arms

Peñacerrada in Spanish or Urizaharra in Basque is a town and municipality located in the province of Álava, in the Basque Country, northern Spain. The Church of Nuestra Señora de la Peña de Faido is located in the town.
