= Montaña Alavesa =

Spanish comarca

Coordinates: 42°40′48″N 2°29′21″W

Montaña Alavesa Arabako Mendialdea
- Cuadrilla de Campezo-Montaña Alavesa
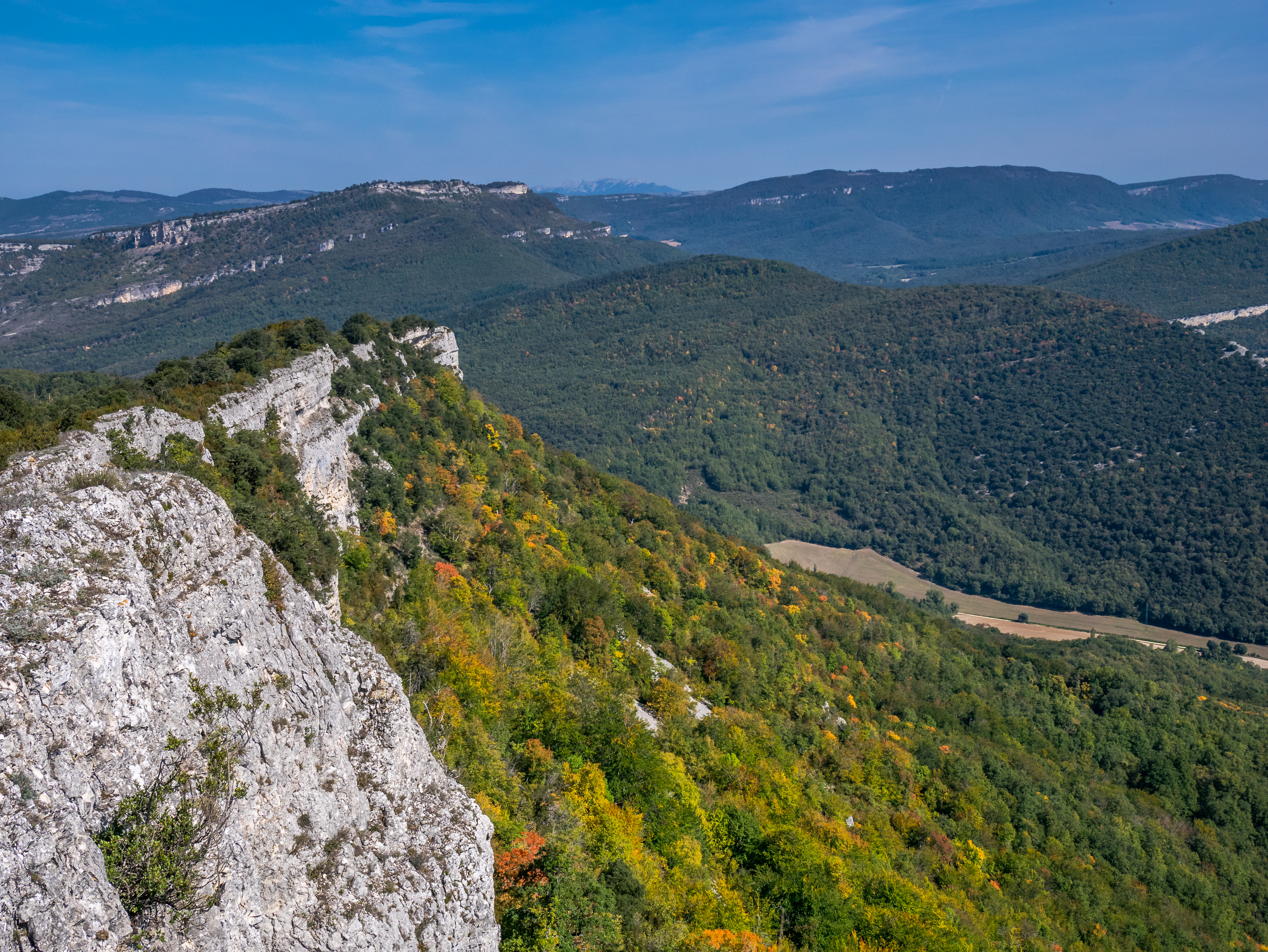
- Landscape of Montaña Alavesa

- Coat of arms

- Location of Montaña Alavesa in Araba
- Country: Spain
- Autonomous community: Basque Country
- Province: Araba

Montaña Alavesa (Basque: Arabako Mendialdea), full Cuadrilla de Campezo-Montaña Alavesa, is a comarca of the province of Álava, Spain. It is located to the southeast of Álava and covers an area of 534.87 km² with a population of 3179 people (2010). The capital lies in Santa Cruz de Campezo.

It includes the municipalities of Arraya-Maestu, Bernedo, Campezo, Lagrán, Peñacerrada and Valle de Arana as well as the lands of the Parzonería de Encía and the communities of Laño, Pipaón and Peñacerrada. It brings together a total of 47 locations.

== Population ==
Montaña Alavesa is a mountainous region and sparsely populated. It has lost over half its population throughout the twentieth century, from the more than 8,000 people in 1900 to the current population. 35.7% of the working population is employed in agriculture. 32% is devoted to industrial activity. Thanks to rising tourism the services industry is presenting an important area of development.

== Municipalities and towns ==
The municipalities and towns (municipality capitals in bold) that make up Montaña Alavesa are:

#	Municipality	Councils	Mayor	Political Party	Population (2010)	% Population	Territory km²
1	Arraia-Maeztu	Apellániz; Atauri; Azazeta; Korres; **Maeztu**; Onraita/Erroeta; Real Valle de Laminoria; Róitegui; Sabando; Virgala Mayor	Ángel Marcos Pérez de Arrilucea Pérez de Alday	PNV	708	22.3	123.11
2	Bernedo	Angostina; Arlucea; **Bernedo**; Marquínez; Navarrete; Oquina; Quintana; San Román de Campezo; Urarte; Urturi; Villafría	Juana Velasco Arroniz	PNV	575	18.1	130.44
3	Campezo/Kanpezu	Antoñana; Bujanda; Orbiso; Oteo; **Santa Cruz de Campezo**	Aitor Aguinaga Legorburu	PNV	1126	35.4	85.02
4	Lagrán	**Lagrán**; Pipaón; Villaverde	José María Martínez Fernández	PNV	178	5.6	45.62
5	Peñacerrada-Urizaharra	Baroja; Faido; Loza; Montoria; Payueta; **Peñacerrada**	Luisa María Alonso Pinedo	Agrup. Mun. Independiente	296	9.3	57.06
6	Harana/Valle de Arana	**Alda**; Contrasta; San Vicente de Arana; Ullíbarri-Arana	Pedro San Vicente Corres	PNV	296	9.3	39.12
7 (*)	Parzonería de Encía						4937
8 (*)	Comunidad de Laño, Pipaón y Peñacerrada						5.13
	**Cuadrilla de Campezo-Montaña Alavesa**				**3179**	**100**	**534.87**

(*) Not municipalities
