= Autopista AP-68 =

Road in trans-European E-road network

Autopista AP-68

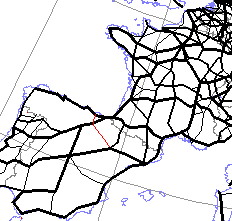

Route information
- Part of E804
- Length: 272 km (169 mi)
- Restrictions: Speed Road restrictions Other restrictions

Major junctions
- From: Zaragoza
- To: Bilbao

Location
- Country: Spain

Highway system
- Highways in Spain; Autopistas and autovías; National Roads

The Autopista AP-68 (also AP-68, Autopista Vasco-Aragonesa or Autopista del Ebro) is a Spanish autopista route. It connects Zaragoza with Bilbao via Tudela, Calahorra and Logroño. The entirety of the route forms the entirety of the European route E804, a B class road in the International E-road Network.

AP-68 / E 804 begins in Bilbao, Spain, passes by Logroño, and ends in Zaragoza, following the path of the Autopista/Autovia 68.

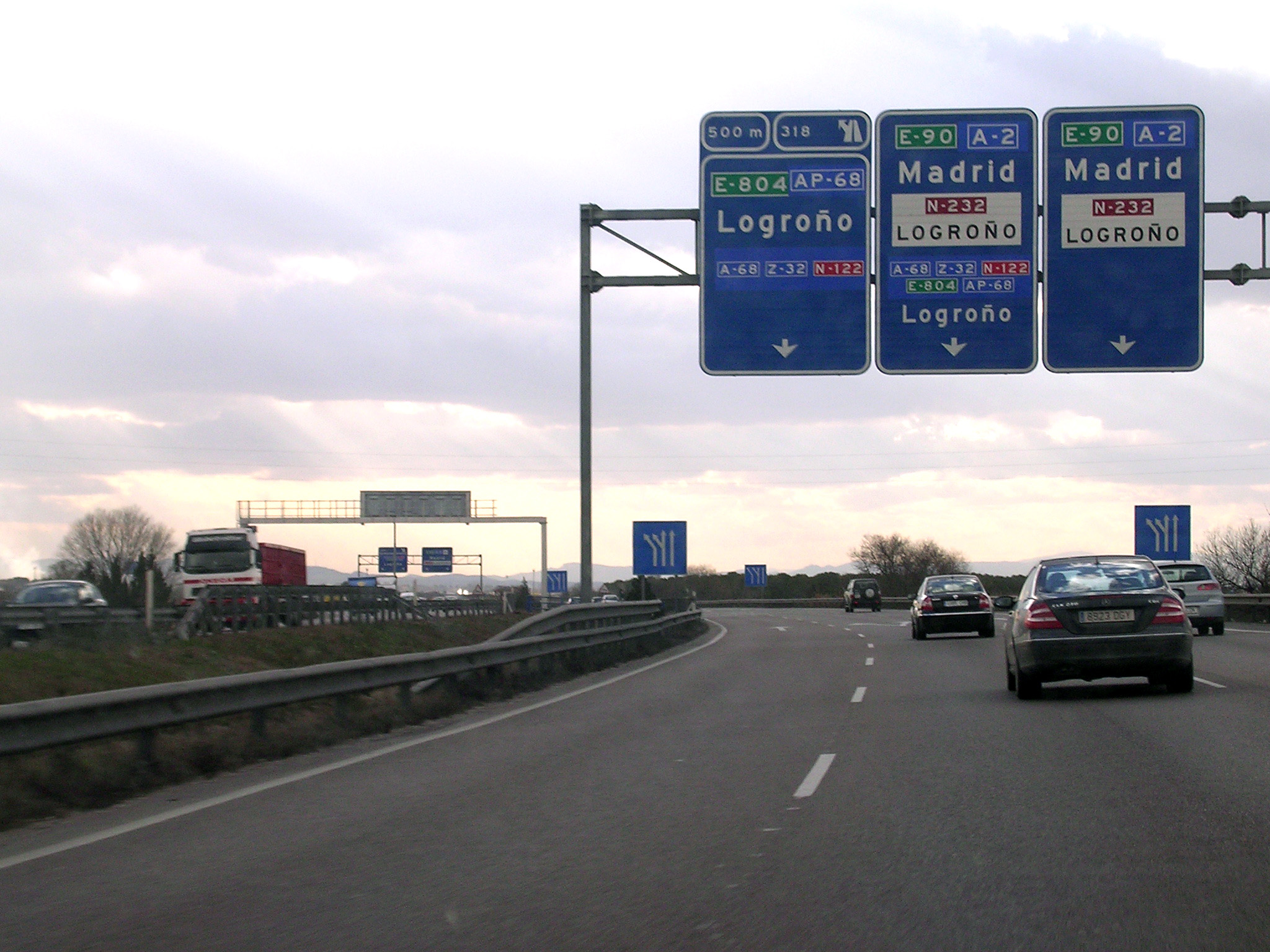
The E 804 through Zaragoza, Spain

It has junctions with Autovía A-2, Autovía A-15, Autovía A-1 and ends at the Autovía A-8.

The highway begins in link 22 of the AP-8 (E-70) and ends on link 318 of the A-2 (E-90) (Autovía del Nordeste). Built between 1974 and 1979, its length is about 295 km. Until 2003, this highway was known as A-68.

== Concession expiry ==
In 2000, the José María Aznar government, the PP, extended the highway concession that expired in 2011 up to 2026, making its recovery impossible, as it was strongly criticized by the Aragon regions and the Basque Country, then governed by PSOE-Aragon and PNV, respectively. In exchange for the extension of the concession, certain tolls became cheaper. The closing date of the award is November 10, 2026.

== Subsidized tolls ==
The highway concessionaire has signed agreements with the Government of La Rioja and the Regional Government of Aragón to enable certain routes free of charge, provided the VIA-T device is used.

For journeys between the Cenicero (10) links and Agoncillo (13), inclusive, and intermediate, tolls are free for users of VIA-T.

Since February 1, 2008, light vehicles that perform return trips within a 24-hour period on any route between the Haro (9) links and Alfaro (16), inclusive, and intermediate, tolls are free for users of VIA-T. Until that date only the toll for the return trip was free, under the same conditions.

Since February 1, 2009, if a return trip is made between the Gallur (19) and Zaragoza (23) links in a 24-hour period, light vehicles are free where the same route is taken for the outward and return journey and the same VIA-T device is used.

In the Basque section a social toll is applied, only to citizens registered in Álava, with discounts for those taking more than 25 trips per month.

== Exit list ==
Name of exit	Name of exit	Link roads
	Bilbao	E-70 A-8
1	Arrigorriaga	BI-625
	Arrigorriaga service area	
2	Llodio-Areta	BI-625
	Toll	
3	Llodio-Orozco	A-625
	Álava / Vizcaya	
4	Amurrio-Ziorraga	A-624
5	Altube; Vitoria-Pamplona	N-622
6	Subijana; Pobes-Nanclares	
7	Vitoria; Madrid-Burgos	E-5 E-80 A-1 AP-1
8	Miranda de Ebro-Zambrana	N-124
	La Rioja LA RIOJA / Álava PAÍS VASCO	
9	Haro-Casalarreina	N-126
10	Cenicero-Nájera	LR-113
11	Logroño west Navarrete-Fuenmayor	A-12 LR-137
12	Logroño-Soria	N-111 LO-20
13	Logroño east-El Sequero; Agoncillo-Logroño–Agoncillo Airport	N-232 LO-20
	COMUNIDAD FORAL DE NAVARRA / La Rioja LA RIOJA	
14	Lodosa-Pradejón (this link is only active from Lodosa-Zaragoza and vice versa)	NA-123 LR-123
	La Rioja LA RIOJA / COMUNIDAD FORAL DE NAVARRA	
15	Calahorra-Arnedo	LR-134
	COMUNIDAD FORAL DE NAVARRA / La Rioja LA RIOJA	
16	Corella-Alfaro	NA-6920 LR-287
17	Pamplona	AP-15
18	Tudela; Tarazona	A-68 N-121
	Provincia de Zaragoza ARAGÓN / COMUNIDAD FORAL DE NAVARRA	
19	Borja; Gallur	N-122 A-127
20	Alagón-Figueruelas	A-68
	Toll	
22	Alagón	A-126
	Continues to Zaragoza via A-68	A-68

== Route ==
- Spain
  - Bilbao ( E70) - Miranda de Ebro ( E5 E80) - Logroño - Zaragoza ( E90, Towards E7)
