= N-622 road (Álava) =

Road in Spain

Autovía N-622

Route information
- Length: 19.35 km (12.02 mi)
- Existed: 1978–present

Major junctions
- From: Vitoria-Gasteiz
- To: Altube

Location
- Country: Spain
- Autonomous community: Basque Country
- Province: Álava

Highway system
- Highways in Spain; Autopistas and autovías; National Roads

The N-622 (known unofficially as the Autovía de Altube) is a road in Álava, Basque Country, Spain. It links Vitoria-Gasteiz with the Autopista AP-68 at Altube. Together with the AP-68 motorway, it constitutes the most important road link between Bilbao and Vitoria-Gasteiz. The whole road is a dual carriageway, with parts of it classified as autovía.

== History ==
The road opened gradually in 1978 after more than two years of works. The Murgia bypass was opened in mid-June, followed a few weeks later by the stretch from Vitoria-Gasteiz to Arangiz. The Letona-Zarate stretch was opened partially (only one of the carriageways) on 22 August, while the Arangiz-Zarate stretch followed in early September. On 14 October the last remaining section of the road was inaugurated, with the opening of the second Aiurdin tunnel.

On 3 June 2009, the interchange with the new AP-1 motorway at Etxabarri Ibiña opened. Traffic from the AP-1 towards the A-1 motorway uses the N-622 from Etxabarri Ibiña to the cloverleaf interchange with the A-1 near Vitoria-Gasteiz. As a result, that stretch suffers from recurrent traffic jams, particularly in the summer. In 2022, a study to improve the traffic flow in the area was announced.
