= N622 =

N622 may refer to:

- N622 highway, a road in the Philippines
- N-622 road (Álava), a road in Spain
