= N-124 road (Spain) =

Road in Spain

National road N-124
- Carretera nacional N-124

Route information
- Length: 21.35 km (Note: The segments in Álava and La Rioja are 14.38 km (8.94 mi) and 6.97 km (4.33 mi) long, respectively.) (13.27 mi)

Major junctions
- From: Armiñón
- To: Ollauri

Location
- Country: Spain
- Autonomous communities: Basque Country, La Rioja
- Provinces: Álava, La Rioja

Highway system
- Highways in Spain; Autopistas and autovías; National Roads

The N-124 is a short road in northern Spain which connects Ollauri, La Rioja with Armiñón, Álava. The Zambrana bypass was upgraded to autovía standards in 2019, while works to upgrade the section from Zambrana to Armiñón started in 2022 and finished in July 2024.

The southern end of the road is at a junction with the N-232 road near Ollauri. It heads north parallel to the Ebro river, bypassing Haro, Briñas and Zambrana. The road ends at a junction with the A-1 motorway in Armiñón, close to Miranda de Ebro.
