= Unai Cuadrado =

Spanish road bicycle racer

Personal information
- Full name: Unai Cuadrado Ruiz de Gauna
- Born: 26 September 1997 (age 29) Eribe, Zigoitia, Spain

Cycling career
- Sport: Cycling
- Current team: Euskaltel–Euskadi
- Discipline: Road
- Role: Rider
- Rider type: Climber

Amateur teams
- 2011: CC Foronda
- 2012–2015: Iturribero de Durana
- 2016: Infisport–ArabaEus
- 2017: Quick Step–Telcom–Gimex
- 2018: Ampo–Goierriko TB

Professional team
- 2019–: Fundación Euskadi

Unai Cuadrado Ruiz de Gauna (born 26 September 1997) is a Spanish cyclist, who currently rides for UCI ProTeam Euskaltel–Euskadi.

== Major results ==
2019
1st Young rider classification Vuelta a Aragón
5th Overall Orlen Nations Grand Prix
7th Overall Grand Prix Priessnitz spa
2020
5th Prueba Villafranca-Ordiziako Klasika
2021
10th Vuelta a Murcia
