= Etxaguen (Zigoitia) =

Hamlet in Álava, Spain

- Concejo
- Etxaguen (Zigoitia)
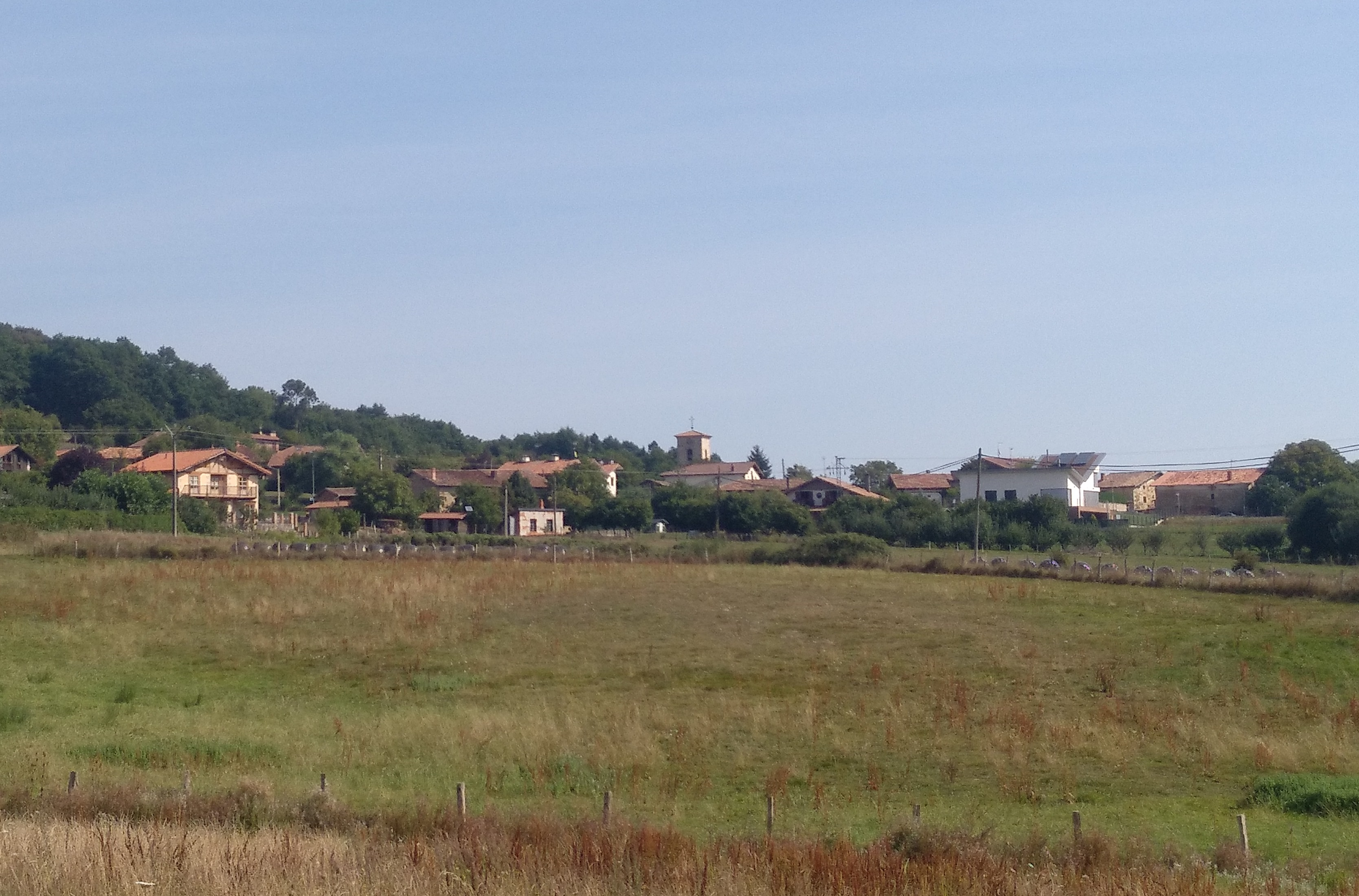
- View of Etxaguen

- Location within Álava Location within the Basque Country Location within Spain
- Coordinates: 42°59′04″N 2°43′23″W
- Country: Spain
- Autonomous community: Basque Country
- Province: Álava
- Comarca: Gorbeialdea
- Municipality: Zigoitia

Area
  - Total: 1.53 km^{2} (0.59 sq mi)
- Elevation: 645 m (2,116 ft)

Population (2022)
  - Total: 78
  - Density: 51/km^{2} (130/sq mi)
- Postal code: 01138

Etxaguen (Spanish: Echagüen, officially in Basque: Etxaguen (Zigoitia)) is a hamlet and concejo in the municipality of Zigoitia, in Álava province, Basque Country, Spain. It is located at the foothills of Oketa, in the Gorbea massif.
