= Zestafe =

Hamlet in Álava, Spain

- Concejo
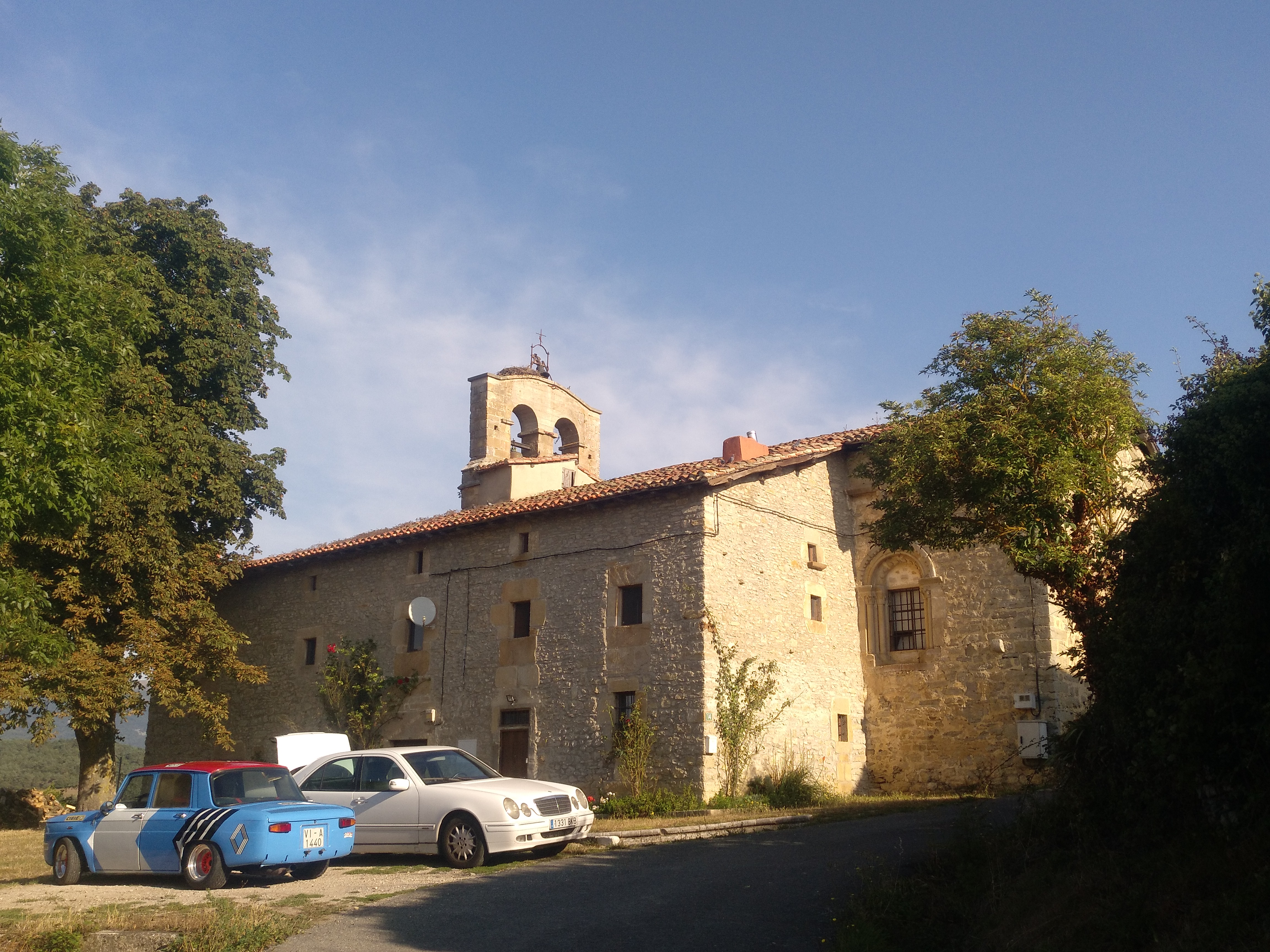
- Church of Zestafe

- Coat of arms

- Location within Álava Location within the Basque Country Location within Spain
- Coordinates: 42°58′16″N 2°42′18″W
- Country: Spain
- Autonomous community: Basque Country
- Province: Álava
- Comarca: Gorbeialdea
- Municipality: Zigoitia

Area
  - Total: 1.80 km^{2} (0.69 sq mi)
- Elevation: 641 m (2,103 ft)

Population (2022)
  - Total: 38
  - Density: 21/km^{2} (55/sq mi)
- Postal code: 01138

Zestafe (Spanish: Cestafe) is a hamlet and concejo in the municipality of Zigoitia, in Álava province, Basque Country, Spain. Part of the neighborhood of Gorostiza belongs to Zestafe, while the rest of it is part of nearby Acosta.
