= Cave of Zubialde =

Cave in Spain

Coordinates: 42°52′05″N 2°41′59″W

- Interactive map of Cave of Zubialde
- Location: Zigoitia, Álava
- Discovery: 1990

Cave of Zubialde was an alleged prehistoric cave located in Zubialde, Gorbea, Spain. In 1990 the paint was examined using electron microscopy, chromatography, and absolute dating. The analyses revealed black and red pigments applied as liquid paint whose chemical composition and surface interaction with the rock indicated a recent origin.

It was discovered in 1990 by Serafín Ruiz, a history student, and it was decorated by 20 animal figurines and 49 hand symbols. It was the best prehistoric discovery of the decade and the most important of País Vasco. It was dated in the Magdalenian, Upper Paleolithic (13.000 to 10.000 BC).

In the same year, Peter Ucko from the University of Southampton and Jill Cook from the British Museum suspected they were fake. The animals depicted were highly unusual for Spain (rhino, mammoth), some of the 'signs' quite bizarre, and some, such as the bison, very ugly and clumsily executed. Later scientific analysis of the pigments showed them to contain highly perishable materials such as insect legs as well as synthetic fibres from modern kitchen sponges.

Subsequently the Ertzaintza, the autonomous police force for the Basque Country, discovered that someone had painted the cave during 1990, the main suspect being Serafín Ruiz.

In 2008 another fraud was discovered in Iruña-Veleia similar to Zubialde.
