= Gorbeia Natural Park =

Natural park in the Basque Country, Spain

- Parque natural del Gorbeia; Gorbeiako natura parkea
- IUCN category V (protected landscape/seascape)
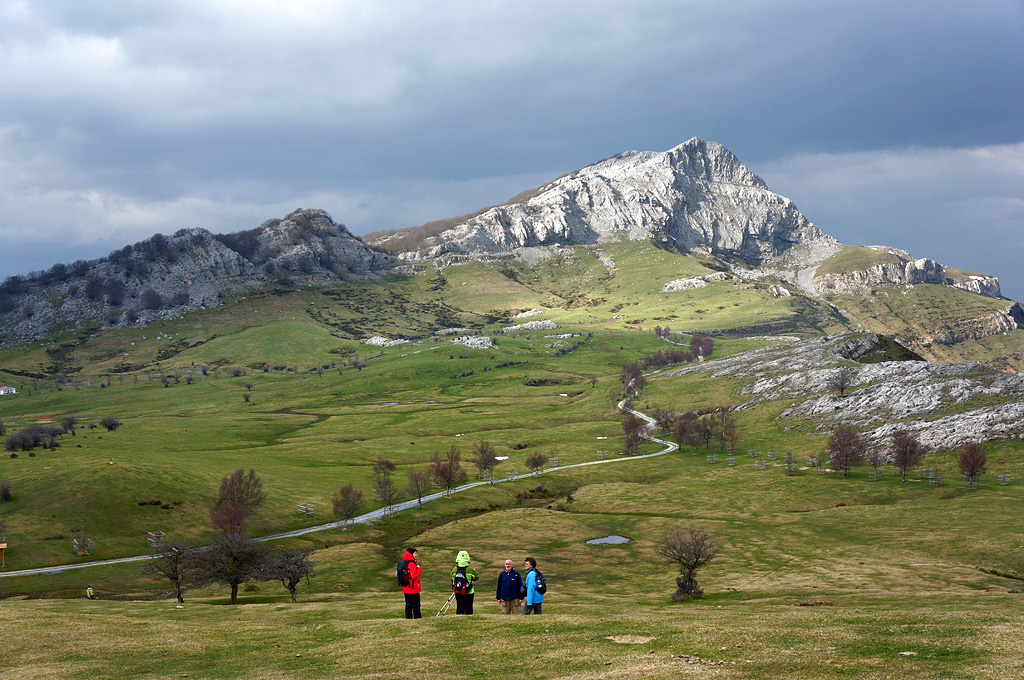
- The fields of Arraba, with Lekanda in the background

- Location within the Basque Country
- Location: Álava and Biscay, Basque Country, Spain
- Coordinates: 43.035°N 2.817°W
- Area: 200.16 km^{2} (77.28 sq mi)
- Established: 21 June 1994

Natura 2000 site (SAC)
- Official name: Gorbeia
- Designated: May 2016
- Reference no.: ES2110009
- Area: 202.26 km^{2} (78.09 sq mi)

The Gorbeia Natural Park (Basque: Gorbeiako natura parkea, Spanish: Parque natural del Gorbeia) is the largest in the Basque Country, Spain. The park is located in the municipalities of Orozko, Zeberio and Zeanuri in Biscay and Zigoitia, Zuia and Urkabustaiz in Álava. With a surface area of 200 km^{2} (77 sq mi), it covers the Gorbeia massif, which is the highest summit in Álava and Biscay. The park was established by decree of the Basque Government in 1994.

== Geography ==
The park is cenetered on mount Gorbeia and the massif of the same name. The summit, with a height of 1,482 m (4,862 ft), is the highest in the provinces of Álava and Biscay. This has made it one of the most emblematic summits of the Basque Country.
