= N-1 road (Spain) =

Road in Spain

National road N-1
- Carretera nacional N-1

Route information
- Length: 112.31 km (Note: Not counting the autovía section in Gipuzkoa designated as N-I.) (69.79 mi)

Major junctions
- From: Madrid
- Aranda de Duero, Burgos, Miranda de Ebro, Vitoria-Gasteiz, San Sebastián
- To: Irun

Location
- Country: Spain

Highway system
- Highways in Spain; Autopistas and autovías; National Roads

The N-1 (formerly designated as N-I) was the main road from Madrid to France in Spain. From Madrid, the road headed north to Burgos. In this section, most of the old N-I has been replaced by the Autovía A-1. From Burgos to Miranda de Ebro the N-1 still exists, running parallel to the (formerly tolled) Autopista AP-1.

In Álava, the former N-I has been redesignated. Current roads using the alignment of the former N-I include the N-102 and N-104, the western and eastern access roads to Vitoria-Gasteiz. In the province of Gipuzkoa, the road is still signed as N-I despite being an autovía. The N-I in Gipuzkoa is tolled for heavy goods vehicles.
