= Mendarozketa =

Hamlet in Álava, Spain

- Concejo
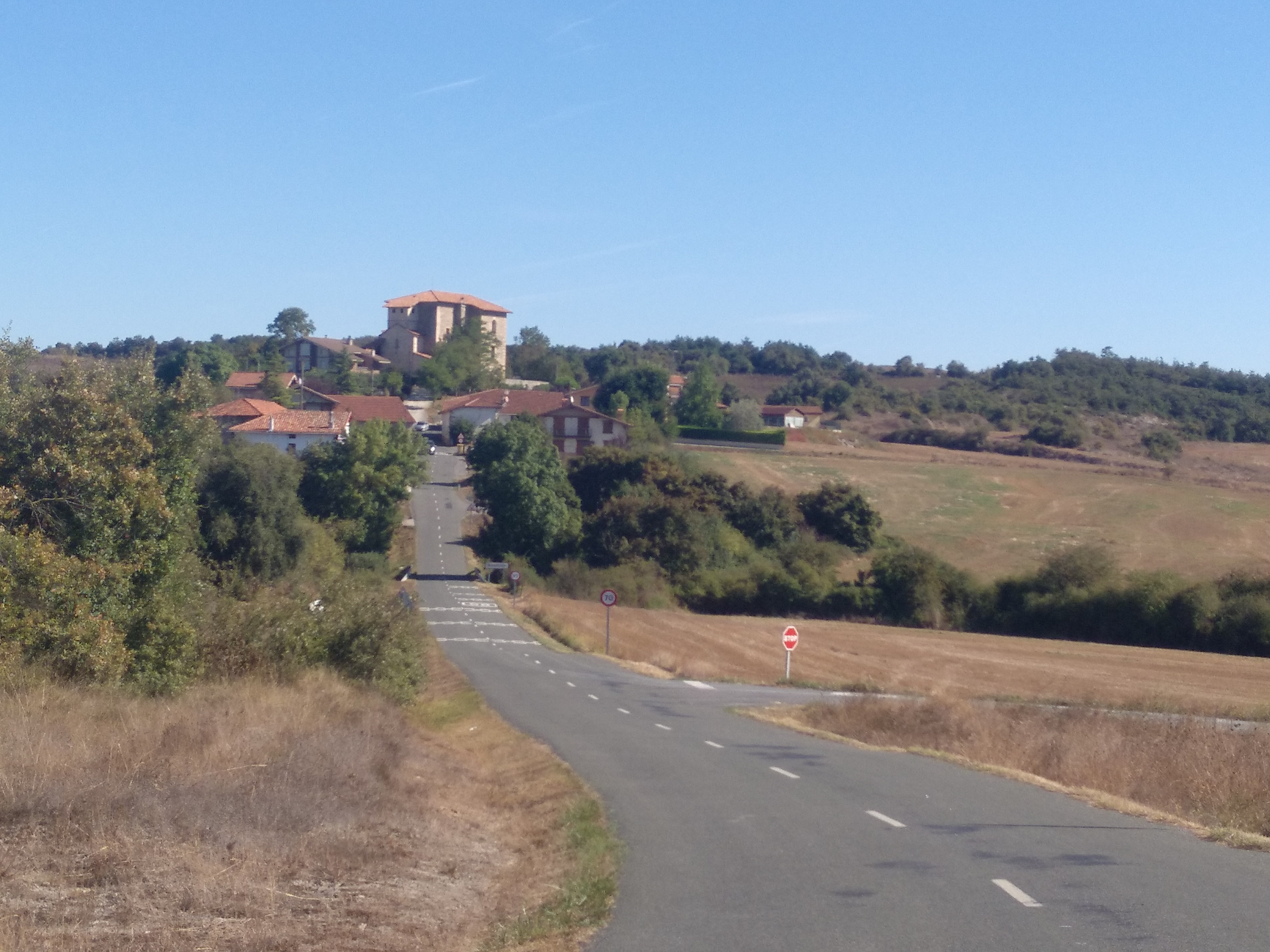
- View of Mendarozketa

- Location within Álava Location within the Basque Country Location within Spain
- Coordinates: 42°55′24″N 2°41′32″W
- Country: Spain
- Autonomous community: Basque Country
- Province: Álava
- Comarca: Gorbeialdea
- Municipality: Zigoitia

Area
  - Total: 3.18 km^{2} (1.23 sq mi)
- Elevation: 561 m (1,841 ft)

Population (2023)
  - Total: 44
  - Density: 14/km^{2} (36/sq mi)
- Postal code: 01196

Mendarozketa (Spanish: Mendarózqueta) is a hamlet and concejo in the municipality of Zigoitia, in Álava province, Basque Country, Spain.
