= Berrikano =

Village in Álava, Spain

- Concejo
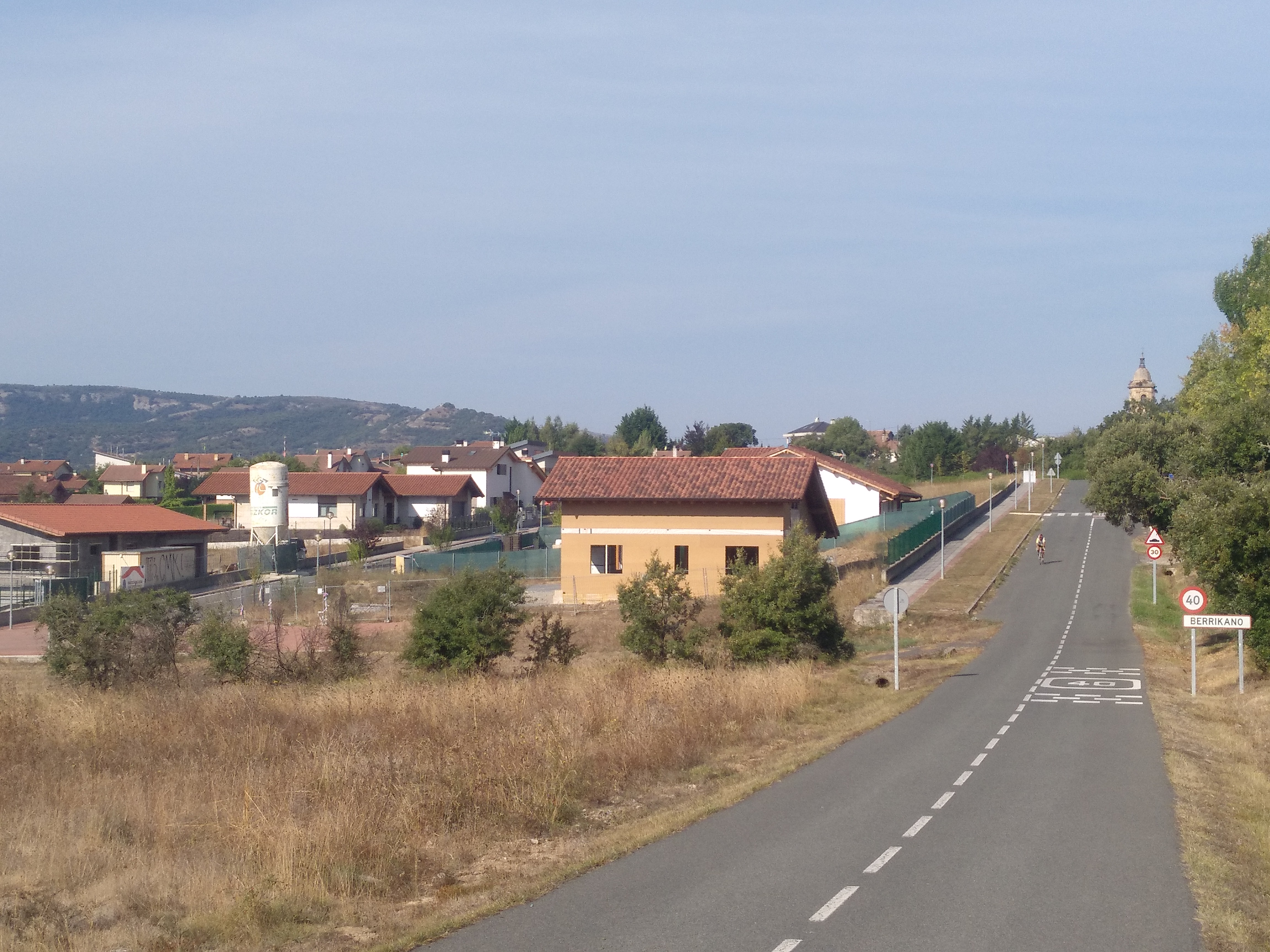
- View of Berrikano

- Location within Álava Location within the Basque Country Location within Spain
- Coordinates: 42°56′32″N 2°43′09″W
- Country: Spain
- Autonomous community: Basque Country
- Province: Álava
- Comarca: Gorbeialdea
- Municipality: Zigoitia

Area
  - Total: 3.41 km^{2} (1.32 sq mi)
- Elevation: 593 m (1,946 ft)

Population (2022)
  - Total: 156
  - Density: 45.7/km^{2} (118/sq mi)
- Postal code: 01138

Berrikano (Spanish: Berrícano, alternatively in Basque: Berrikao) is a village and concejo located in the municipality of Zigoitia, in Álava province, Basque Country, Spain. The population has increased notably since the 1990s due to the construction of new housing areas.
