= Buruaga =

Hamlet in Álava, Spain

- Concejo
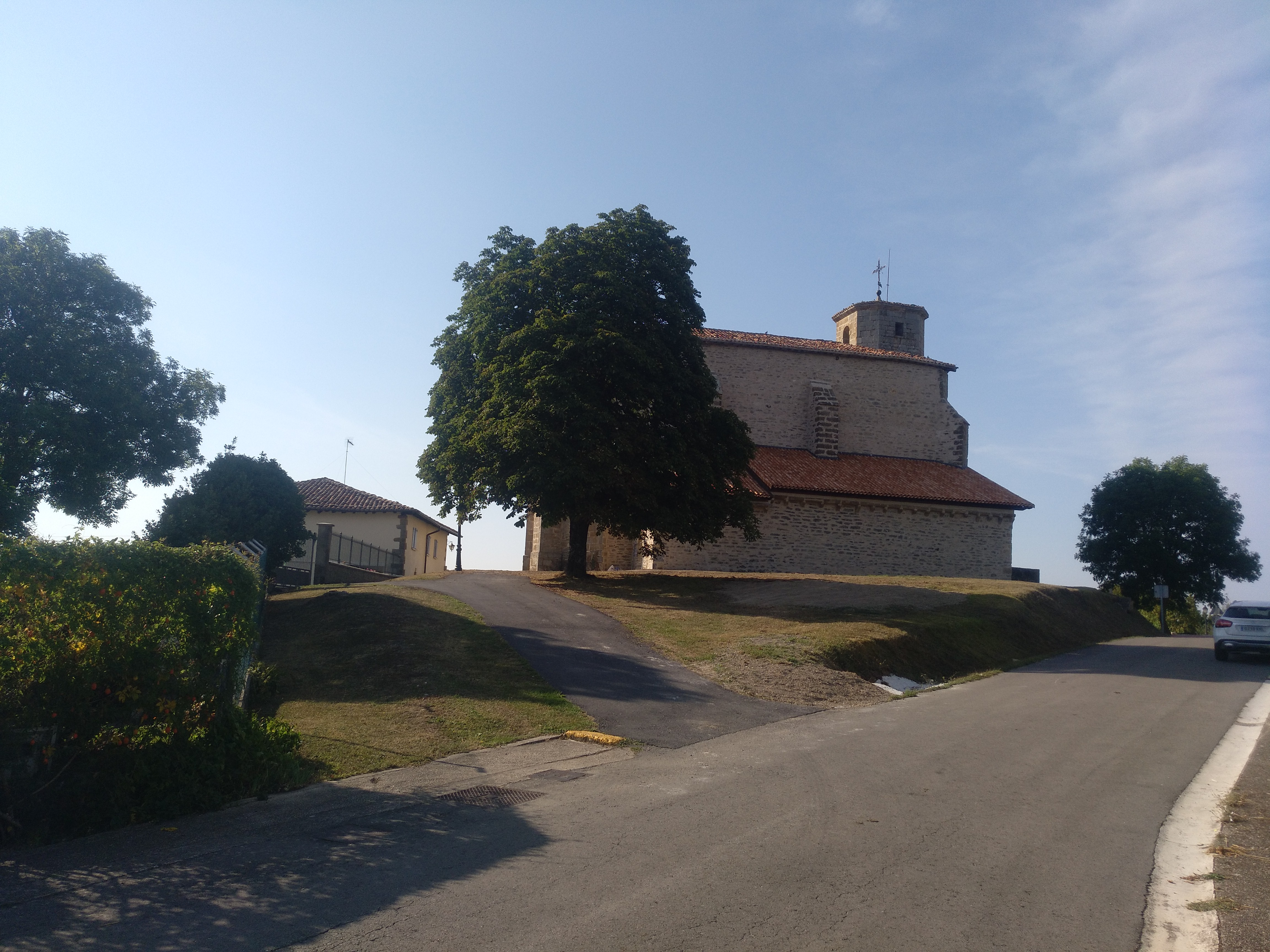
- Church of Buruaga

- Location within Álava Location within the Basque Country Location within Spain
- Coordinates: 42°56′48″N 2°42′10″W
- Country: Spain
- Autonomous community: Basque Country
- Province: Álava
- Comarca: Gorbeialdea
- Municipality: Zigoitia

Area
  - Total: 5.01 km^{2} (1.93 sq mi)
- Elevation: 609 m (1,998 ft)

Population (2022)
  - Total: 48
  - Density: 9.6/km^{2} (25/sq mi)
- Postal code: 01138

Buruaga is a hamlet and concejo in the municipality of Zigoitia, in Álava province, Basque Country, Spain. It is located at the boundary between the valley of Zigoitia and the plains of the Llanada Alavesa.
