= Estavillo =

Village in Álava, Spain

- Concejo
- Location within Álava Location within the Basque Country Location within Spain
- Coordinates: 42°43′43″N 2°51′41″W
- Country: Spain
- Autonomous community: Basque Country
- Province: Álava
- Comarca: Añana
- Municipality: Armiñón

Area
  - Total: 5.01 km^{2} (1.93 sq mi)
- Elevation: 527 m (1,729 ft)

Population (2023)
  - Total: 118
  - Density: 23.6/km^{2} (61.0/sq mi)
- Postal code: 01220

Estavillo is a village and concejo in the municipality of Armiñón, in Álava province, Basque Country, Spain.
