= Apodaka =

Village in Álava, Spain

- Concejo
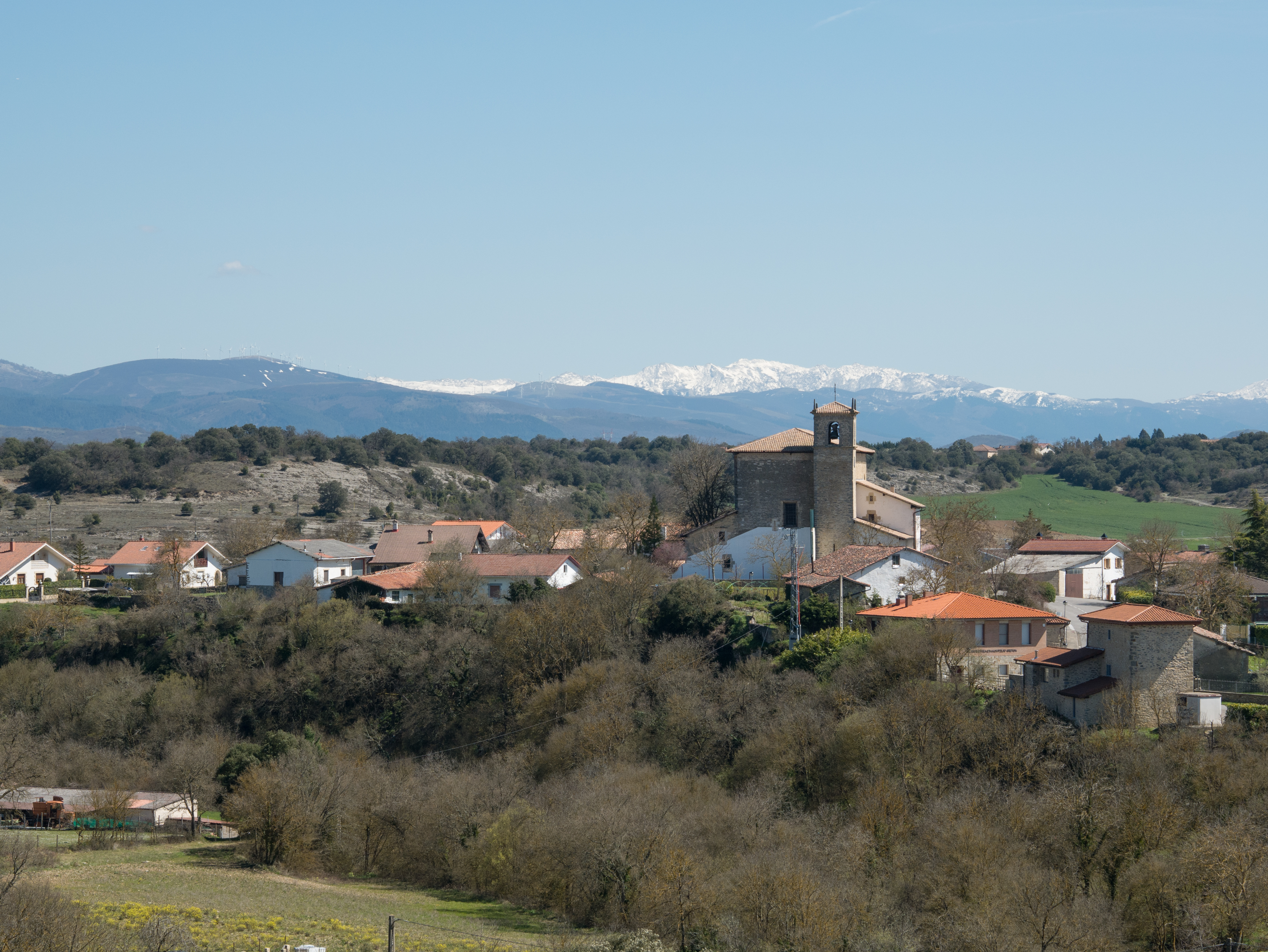
- View of Apodaka

- Location within Álava Location within the Basque Country Location within Spain
- Coordinates: 42°55′03″N 2°43′45″W
- Country: Spain
- Autonomous community: Basque Country
- Province: Álava
- Comarca: Gorbeialdea
- Municipality: Zigoitia

Area
  - Total: 7.16 km^{2} (2.76 sq mi)
- Elevation: 550 m (1,800 ft)

Population (2022)
  - Total: 159
  - Density: 22.2/km^{2} (57.5/sq mi)
- Postal code: 01138

Apodaka (Spanish: Apodaca) is a village and concejo in the municipality of Zigoitia, in Álava province, Basque Country, Spain. It is located at the foothills of Arrato.
