= Ondategi =

Hamlet in Álava, Spain

- Concejo
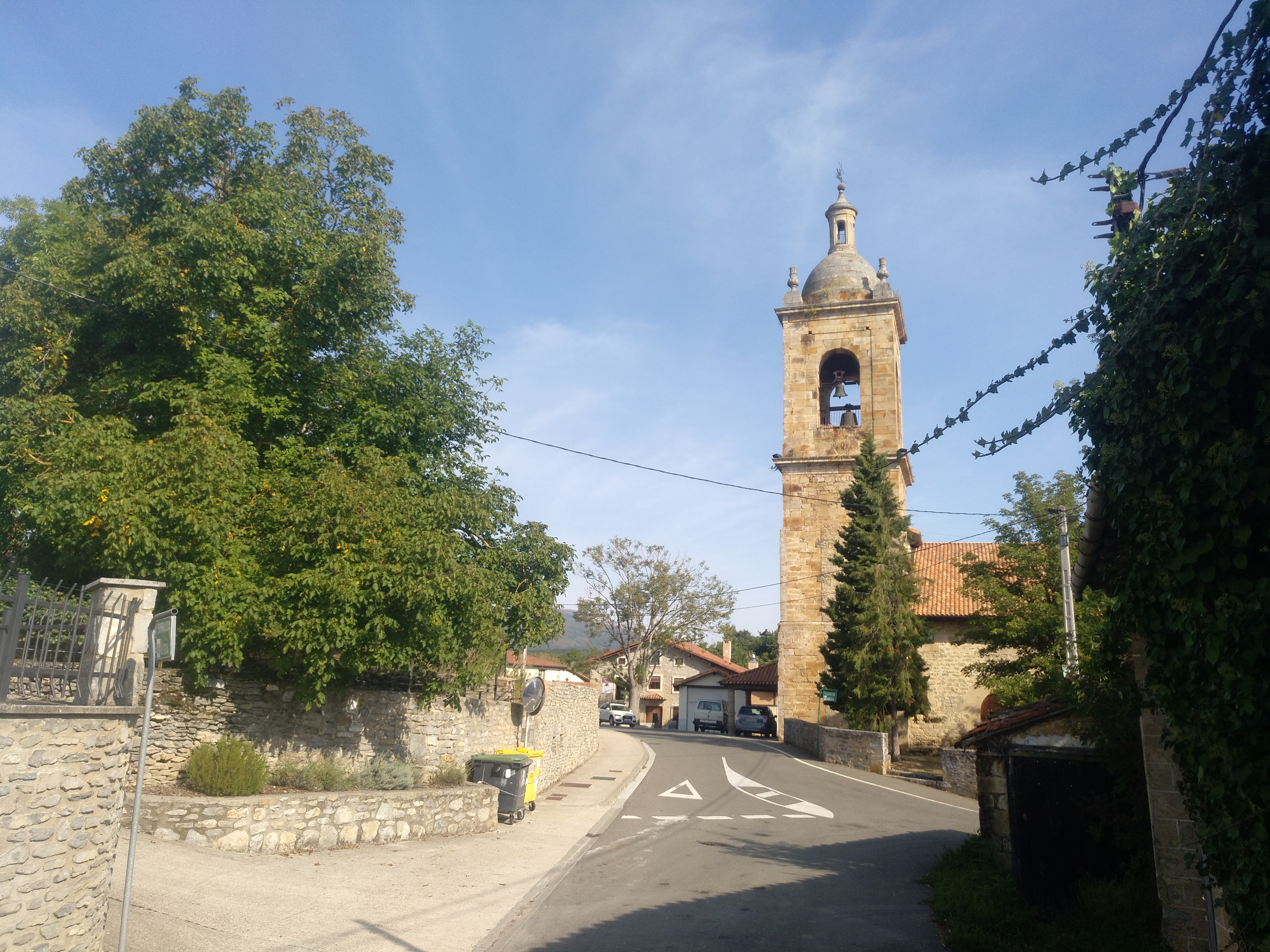
- View of Ondategi

- Location within Álava Location within the Basque Country Location within Spain
- Coordinates: 42°57′22″N 2°44′06″W
- Country: Spain
- Autonomous community: Basque Country
- Province: Álava
- Comarca: Vitoria-Gasteiz
- Municipality: Vitoria-Gasteiz

Area
  - Total: 4.09 km^{2} (1.58 sq mi)
- Elevation: 600 m (2,000 ft)

Population (2023)
  - Total: 167
  - Density: 40.8/km^{2} (106/sq mi)
- Postal code: 01138

Ondategi (Spanish: Ondátegui) is a village and concejo in the municipality of Zigoitia, in Álava province, Basque Country, Spain. It is the capital of the municipality.
