= Larrinoa =

Hamlet in Álava, Spain

- Hamlet
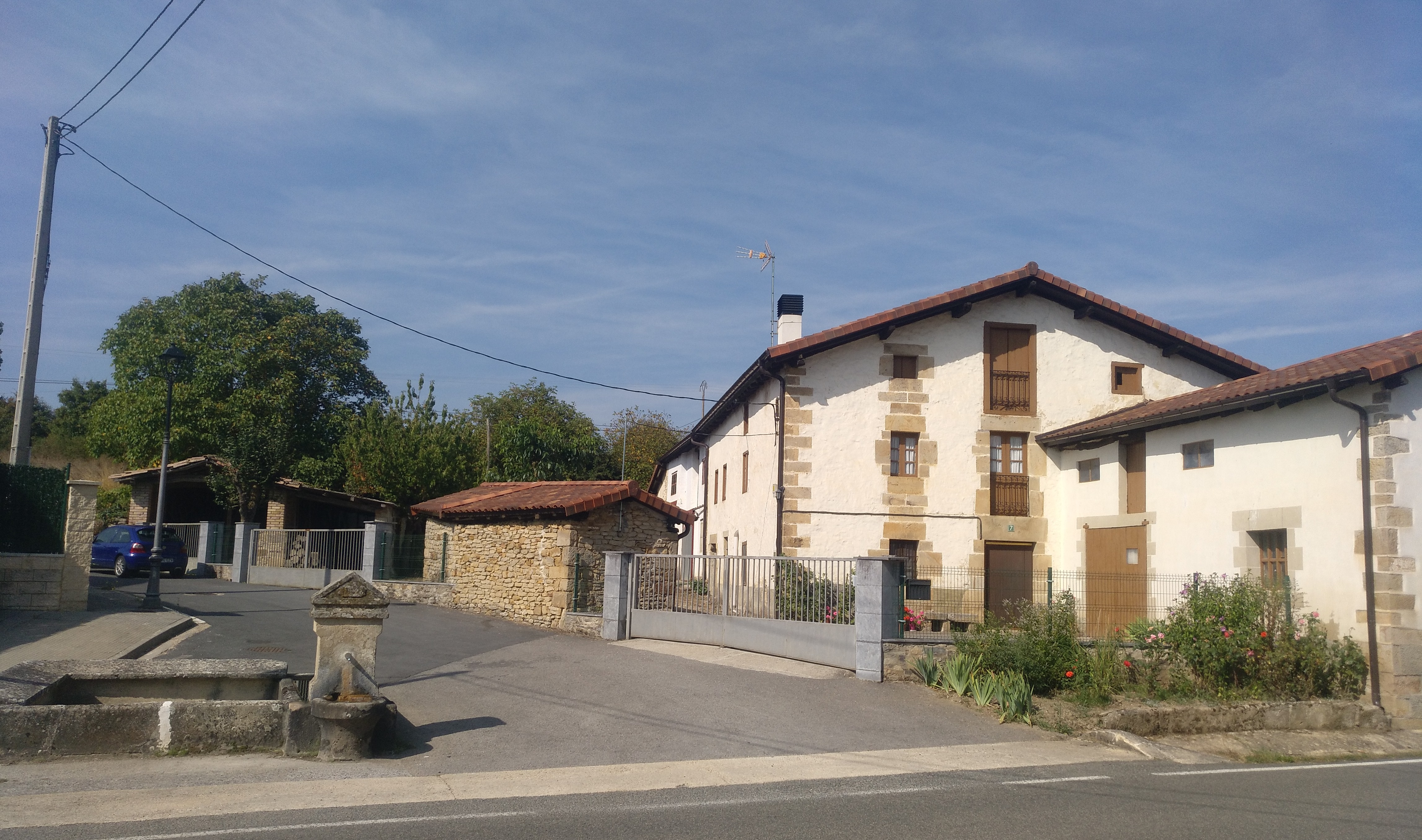
- View of Larrinoa

- Location within Álava Location within the Basque Country Location within Spain
- Coordinates: 42°58′04″N 2°43′57″W
- Country: Spain
- Autonomous community: Basque Country
- Province: Álava
- Comarca: Gorbeialdea
- Municipality: Zigoitia
- Elevation: 595 m (1,952 ft)

Population (2021)
  - Total: 34
- Postal code: 01138

Larrinoa (Basque pronunciation: [larinoa], Spanish: Larrínoa [laˈrinoa]) is a hamlet located in the municipality of Zigoitia, in Álava province, Basque Country, Spain. Unlike the other hamlets in the municipality, it is not organized into a concejo. It is located 15 km north-northwest of Vitoria-Gasteiz.

== Notable people ==
- Juan de Álava (1480–1537), architect.
