= Manurga =

Hamlet in Álava, Spain

- Concejo
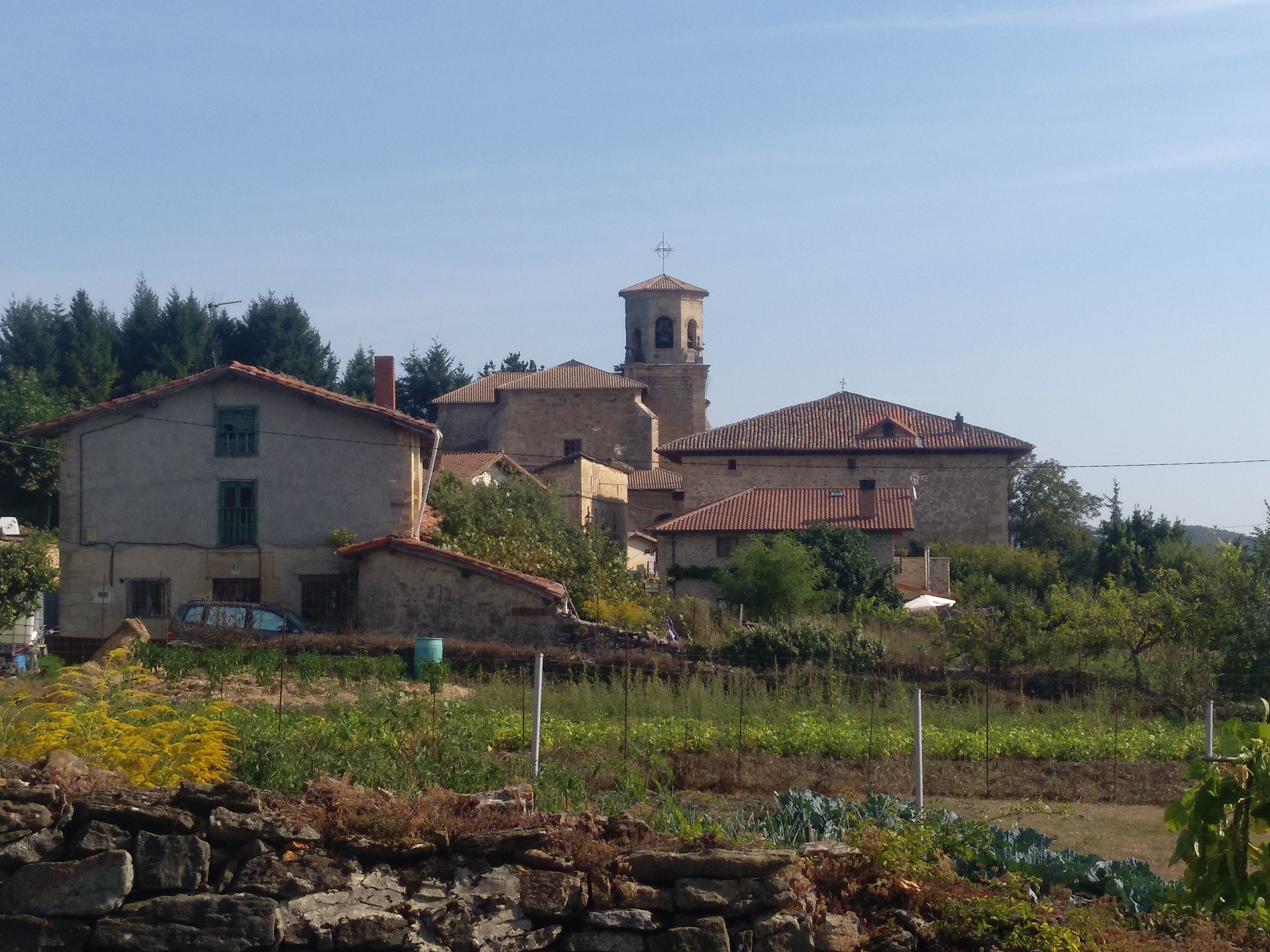
- View of Manurga

- Location within Álava Location within the Basque Country Location within Spain
- Coordinates: 42°57′59″N 2°45′10″W
- Country: Spain
- Autonomous community: Basque Country
- Province: Álava
- Comarca: Gorbeialdea
- Municipality: Zigoitia

Area
  - Total: 4.47 km^{2} (1.73 sq mi)
- Elevation: 659 m (2,162 ft)

Population (2023)
  - Total: 81
  - Density: 18/km^{2} (47/sq mi)
- Postal code: 01138

Manurga (Basque: Maurga) is a hamlet and concejo in the municipality of Zigoitia, in Álava province, Basque Country, Spain.
