= Olano, Álava =

Hamlet in Álava, Spain

Olano
- Concejo
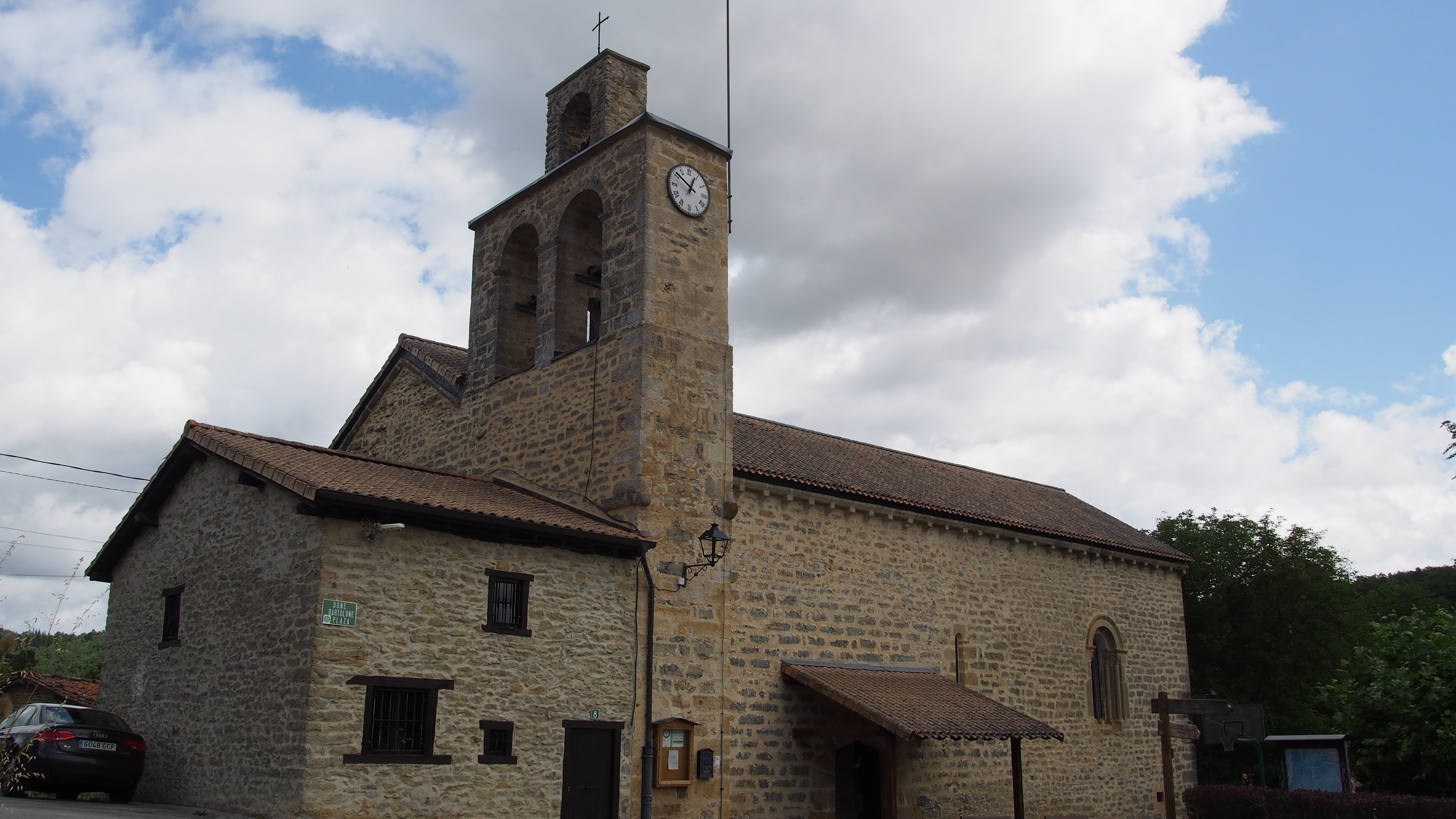
- The church of Olano

- Location within Álava Location within the Basque Country Location within Spain
- Coordinates: 42°57′06″N 2°45′56″W
- Country: Spain
- Autonomous community: Basque Country
- Province: Álava
- Comarca: Gorbeialdea
- Municipality: Zigoitia

Area
  - Total: 3.05 km^{2} (1.18 sq mi)
- Elevation: 594 m (1,949 ft)

Population (2023)
  - Total: 22
  - Density: 7.2/km^{2} (19/sq mi)
- Postal code: 01138

Olano is a hamlet and concejo in the municipality of Zigoitia, in Álava province, Basque Country, Spain.
