= Eribe =

Hamlet in Álava, Spain

- Concejo
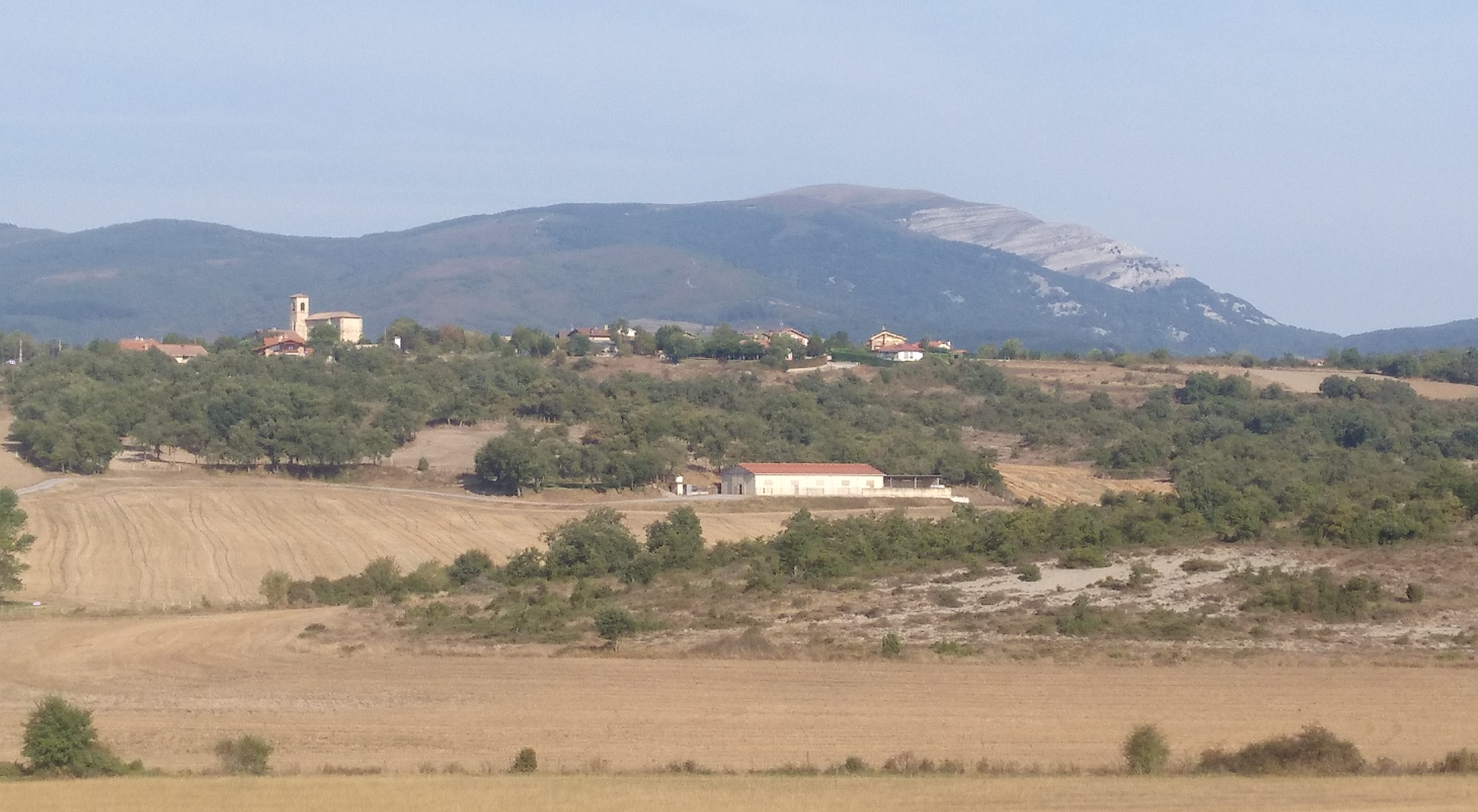
- View of Eribe with Gorbea in the background

- Location within Álava Location within the Basque Country Location within Spain
- Coordinates: 42°57′23″N 2°42′38″W
- Country: Spain
- Autonomous community: Basque Country
- Province: Álava
- Comarca: Gorbeialdea
- Municipality: Zigoitia

Area
  - Total: 3.72 km^{2} (1.44 sq mi)
- Elevation: 640 m (2,100 ft)

Population (2022)
  - Total: 65
  - Density: 17/km^{2} (45/sq mi)
- Postal code: 01138

Eribe is a hamlet and concejo located in the municipality of Zigoitia, in Álava province, Basque Country, Spain. The parish church, dedicated to Saint Martin, contains pre-Romanesque elements; although most of it was built in later periods.
