= Zaitegi =

Hamlet in Álava, Spain

- Concejo
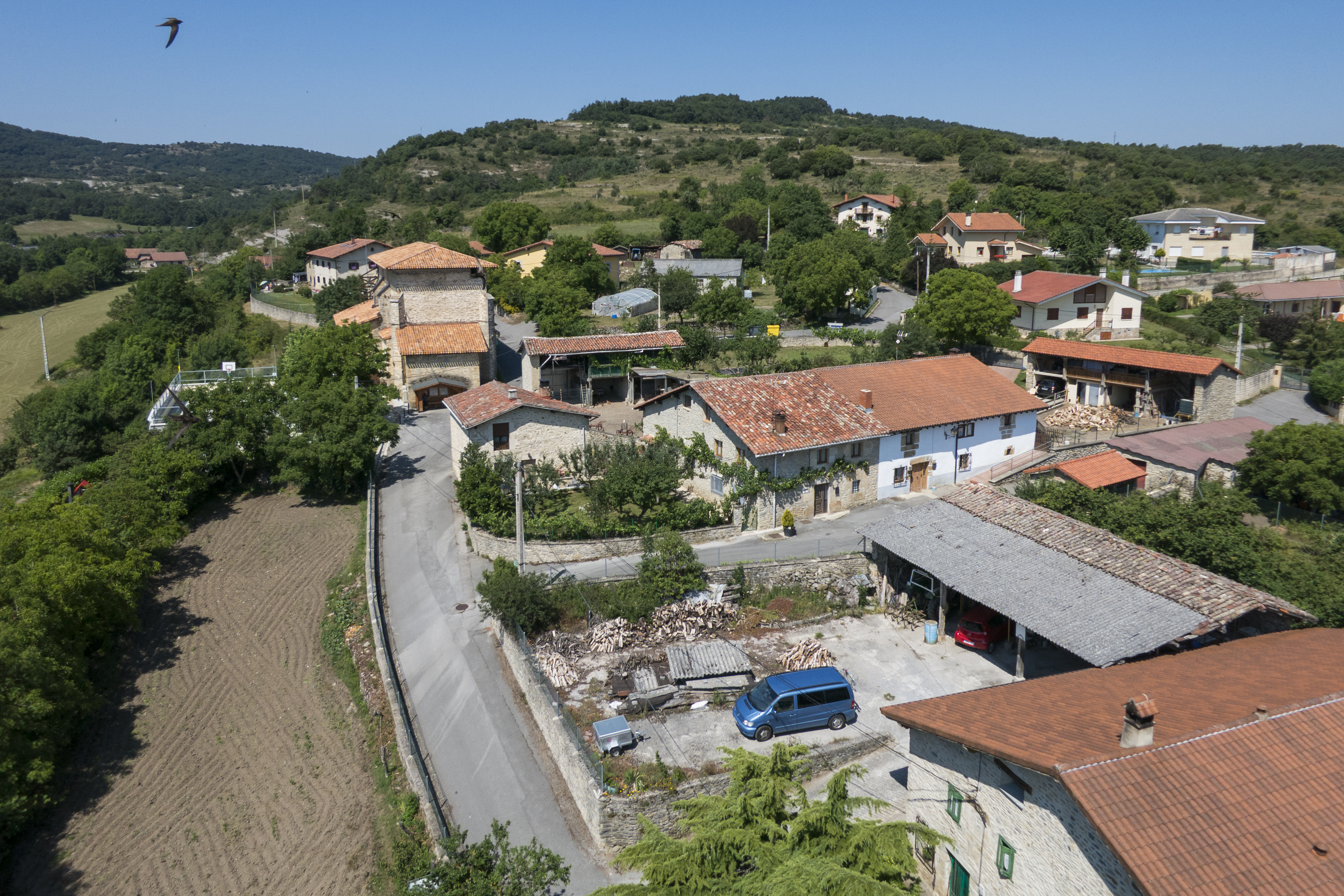

- Coat of arms

- Location within Álava Location within the Basque Country Location within Spain
- Coordinates: 42°56′N 2°46′W
- Country: Spain
- Autonomous community: Basque Country
- Province: Álava
- Comarca: Gorbeialdea
- Municipality: Zigoitia

Area
  - Total: 4.04 km^{2} (1.56 sq mi)
- Elevation: 590 m (1,940 ft)

Population (2022)
  - Total: 42
  - Density: 10/km^{2} (27/sq mi)
- Postal code: 01138

Zaitegi (Spanish: Záitegui) is a hamlet and concejo located in the municipality of Zigoitia, in Álava province, Basque Country, Spain. During the Middle Ages, a castle was built in a nearby summit, a chapel stands at its former location.
