= Arangiz =

Hamlet in Álava, Spain

- Concejo
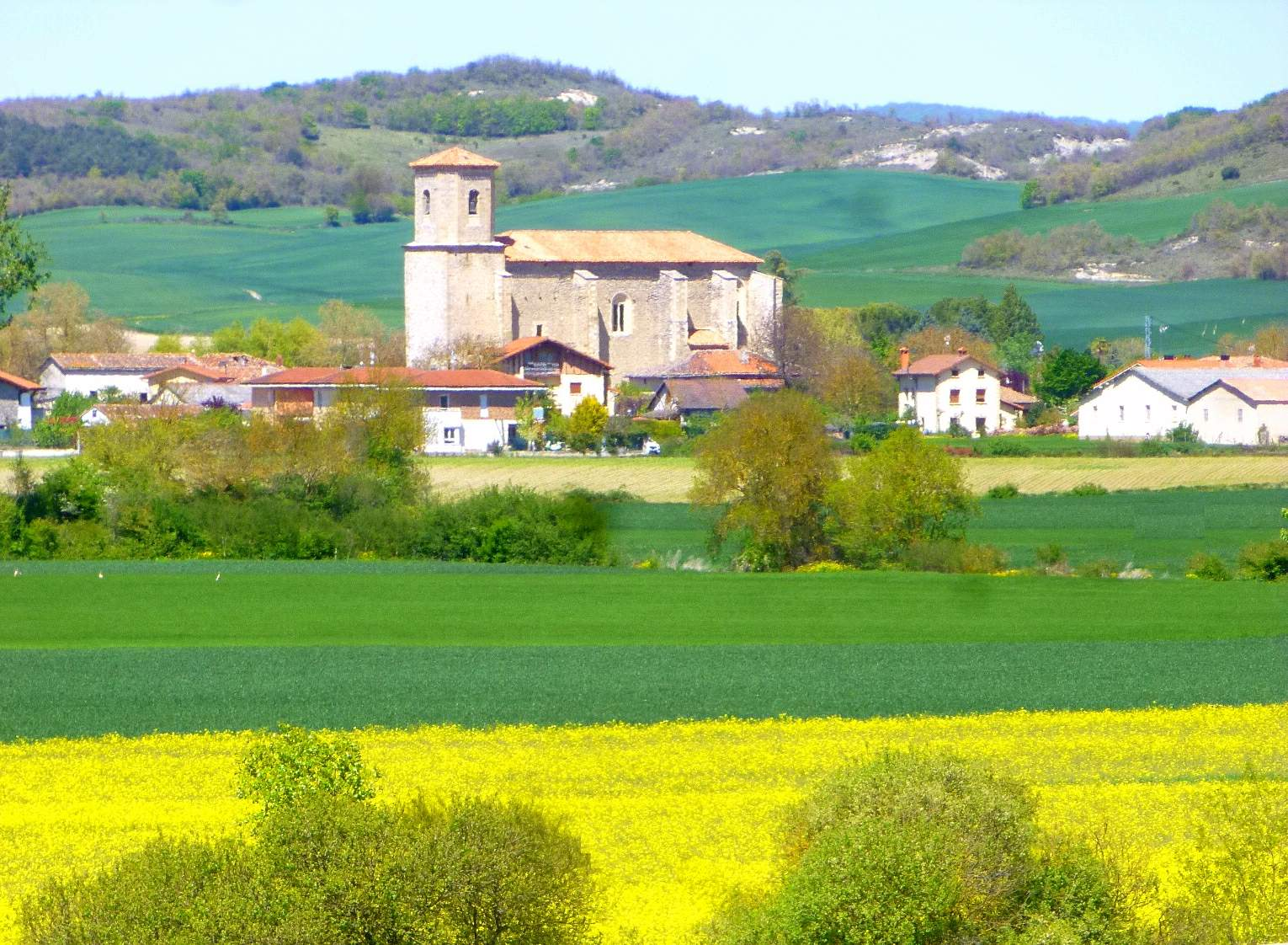
- View of Arangiz

- Coat of arms

- Location within Álava Location within the Basque Country Location within Spain
- Coordinates: 42°53′18″N 2°42′0″W
- Country: Spain
- Autonomous community: Basque Country
- Province: Álava
- Comarca: Vitoria-Gasteiz
- Municipality: Vitoria-Gasteiz

Area
  - Total: 4.36 km^{2} (1.68 sq mi)
- Elevation: 511 m (1,677 ft)

Population (2021)
  - Total: 102
  - Density: 23.4/km^{2} (60.6/sq mi)
- Postal code: 01196

Arangiz (Basque pronunciation: [araŋɡis̻], Spanish: Aránguiz [aˈɾaŋɡiθ]) is a hamlet and concejo located in the municipality of Vitoria-Gasteiz, in Álava province, Basque Country, Spain. It is located between the N-622 motorway and Vitoria Airport.

== History ==
The hamlet was part of the Hermandad de Badayoz, and later belonged to the lands of the Duque del Infantado. It was later part of the municipality of Foronda until it was absorbed by Vitoria in the 1970s.

== Heritage ==
The parish church is dedicated to Saint Peter. The building dates from the late 16th or early 17th centuries. The baroque altarpiece, dating from the early 18th century, was built by Juan Antonio Jáuregui.
