= Murua, Álava =

Hamlet in Álava, Spain

Murua
- Concejo
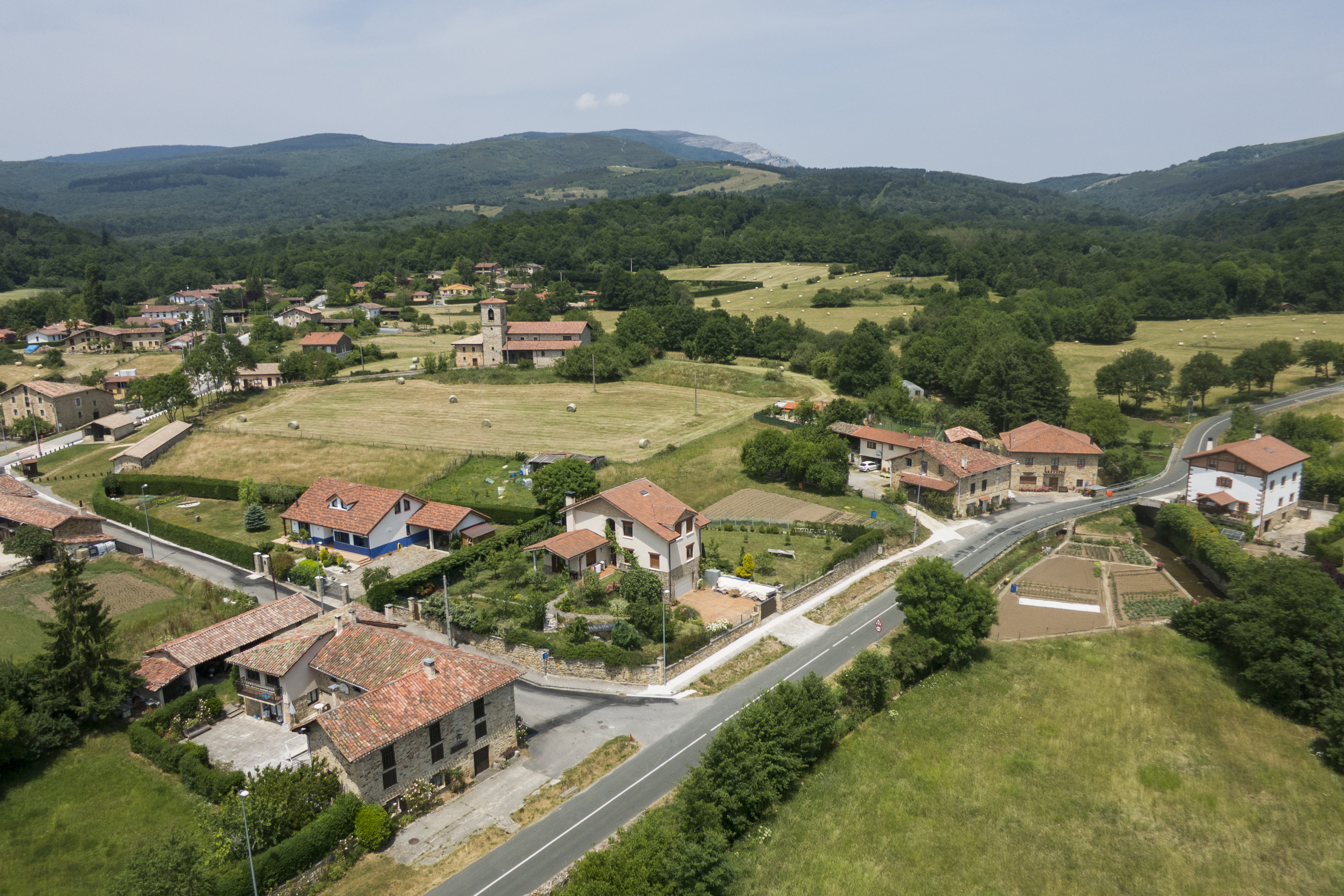

- Location within Álava Location within the Basque Country Location within Spain
- Coordinates: 42°58′32″N 2°44′07″W
- Country: Spain
- Autonomous community: Basque Country
- Province: Álava
- Comarca: Gorbeialdea
- Municipality: Zigoitia

Area
  - Total: 1.94 km^{2} (0.75 sq mi)
- Elevation: 607 m (1,991 ft)

Population (2023)
  - Total: 151
  - Density: 77.8/km^{2} (202/sq mi)
- Postal code: 01138

Murua (Spanish pronunciation: [ˈmuɾwa], Basque pronunciation: [muɾu.a]) is a hamlet and concejo in the municipality of Zigoitia, in Álava province, Basque Country, Spain.
