= Autopista AP-1 =

Autopista AP-1
- Autopista del Norte
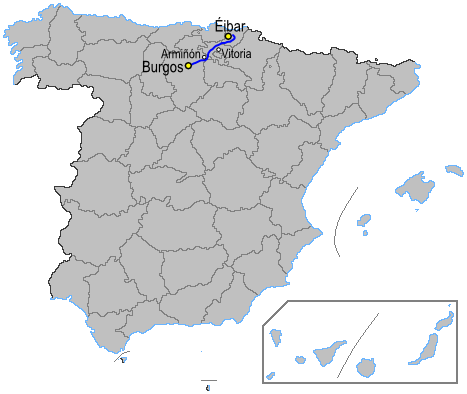

Route information
- Part of E5 / E80
- Length: 175 km (109 mi)

Major junctions
- From: Burgos
- To: Eibar

Location
- Country: Spain

Highway system
- Highways in Spain; Autopistas and autovías; National Roads

The Autopista AP-1 (also known in Spanish as Autopista del Norte) is a Spanish autopista. It has two separate sections: the first from Burgos to Armiñón, and the second from Etxabarri Ibiña (a hamlet close to Vitoria-Gasteiz) to Eibar. In Eibar, at the Malzaga junction, AP-1 meets Autopista AP-8, which connects with Irun and the French border.

The first section became toll-free in 2018. However, it has kept the AP prefix, usually reserved to tolled motorways.

== See also ==
- Autovía A-1
- Carretera Nacional N-I
