= Gopegi =

Village in Álava, Spain

- Concejo
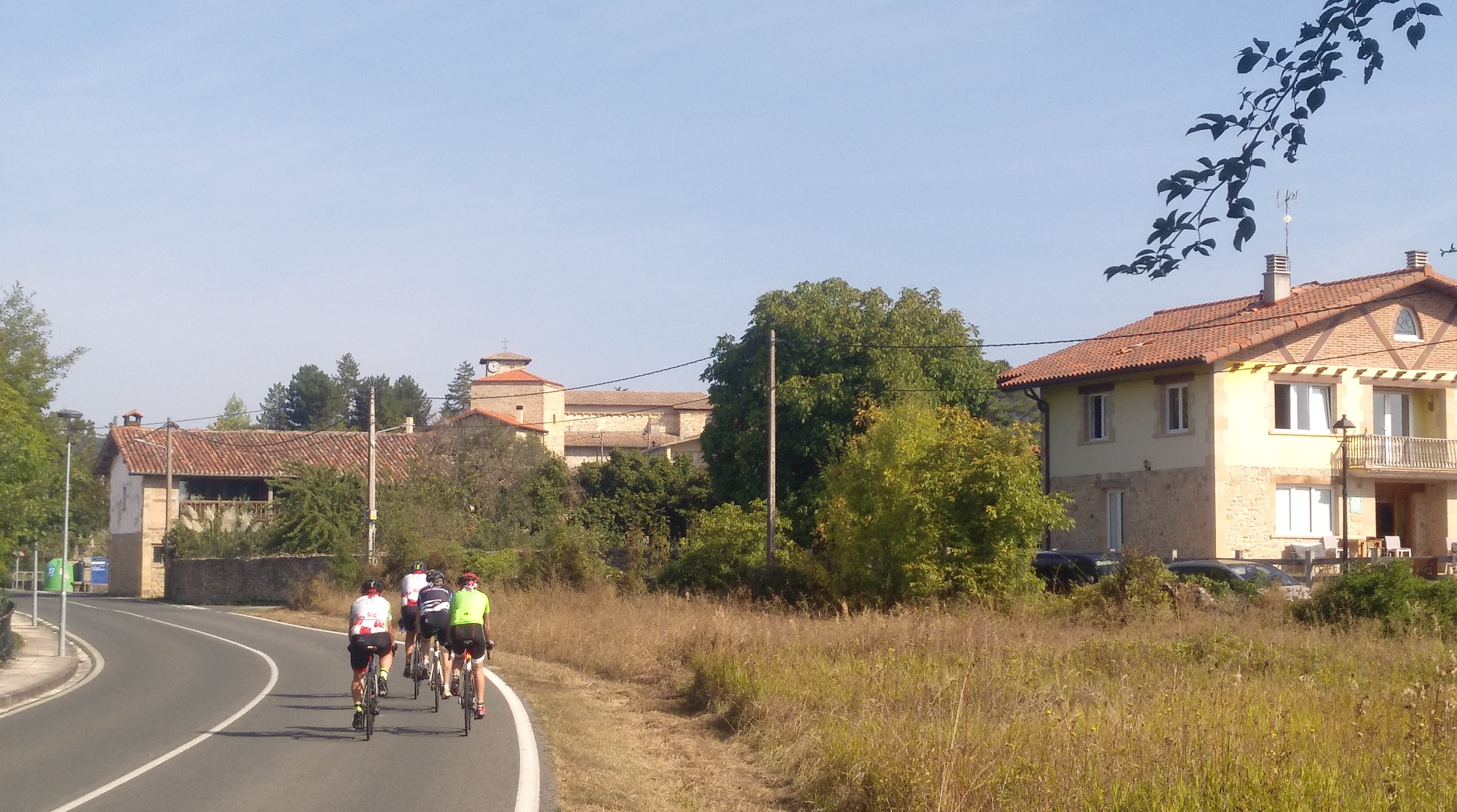
- View of Gopegi

- Location within Álava Location within the Basque Country Location within Spain
- Coordinates: 42°57′50″N 2°43′46″W
- Country: Spain
- Autonomous community: Basque Country
- Province: Álava
- Comarca: Gorbeialdea
- Municipality: Zigoitia

Area
  - Total: 2.35 km^{2} (0.91 sq mi)
- Elevation: 602 m (1,975 ft)

Population (2023)
  - Total: 272
  - Density: 116/km^{2} (300/sq mi)
- Postal code: 01138

Gopegi (Spanish: Gopegui) is a village and concejo in the municipality of Zigoitia, in Álava province, Basque Country, Spain.
