= Daet Airport Road =

Road in the Philippines

Daet Airport Road

Route information
- Maintained by Department of Public Works and Highways
- Length: 4.34 km (2.70 mi)

Major junctions
- West end: N621 (Tagas-Daet Poblacion-Magang Road) in Daet
- East end: President Cory C. Aquino Boulevard in Daet

Location
- Country: Philippines
- Provinces: Camarines Norte
- Towns: Daet

Highway system
- Roads in the Philippines; Highways; Expressways; List
← N621	→ N623

The Daet Airport Road, also known as Ninoy Aquino Avenue and Bagasbas Road and designated as National Route 622 (N622), is part of the Philippine highway network. Until 2025, it was one of the national secondary roads with two non-contiguous sections: one running through the municipalities of Kawit and Noveleta in Cavite, and another running through the municipality of Daet in Camarines Norte; both sections being located on the island of Luzon. The Cavite section of N622 has since received its own designation, N400, while the Camarines Norte section retained the N622 designation as the sole component road.

== Route description ==
N622 runs within the municipality of Daet. Starting from Vinzons Avenue (Tagas–Daet Poblacion–Magang Road) in the town proper of Daet, it serves as an access road to the coastal barangay of Bagasbas and Daet Airport. The route ends at the intersection with President Cory C. Aquino (Bagasbas Boulevard) in Bagasbas, while Daet Airport Road continues southeast as an unnumbered route toward the airport of the same name.

Until 2025, N622 had a non-contiguous section in Cavite, running near the municipal boundary of Kawit and Noveleta as Noveleta–Rosario Diversion Road or EPZA Diversion Road. This section ran between N62 (A. Bonifacio Street) and N64 (Antero Soriano Highway) and has since been redesignated as N400.
