= Ollauri =

- Municipality
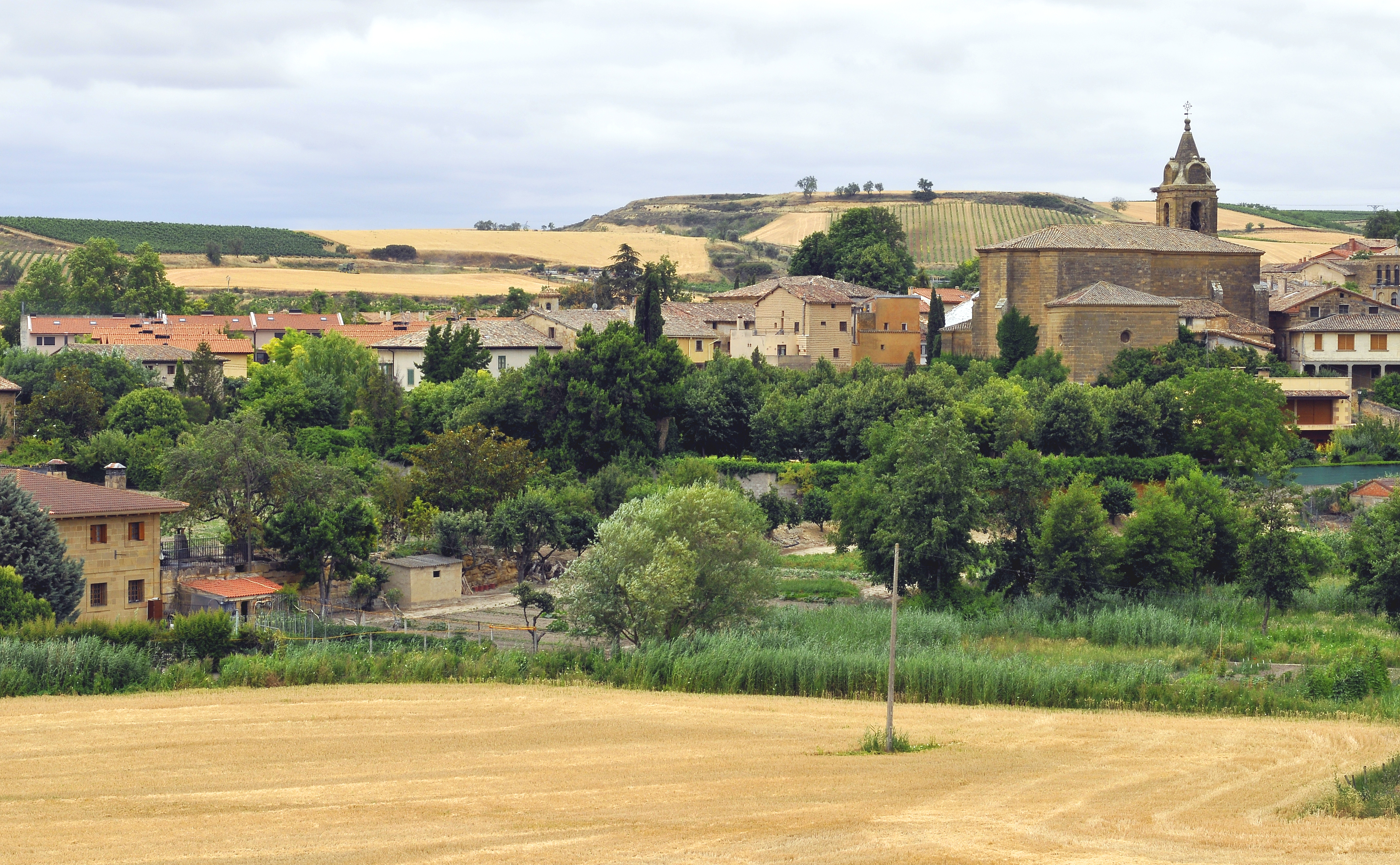
- Skyline of Ollauri

- Location within La Rioja, Spain Location within Spain
- Coordinates: 42°32′31″N 2°49′59″W
- Country: Spain
- Autonomous community: La Rioja
- Comarca: Haro

Government
  - Mayor: Miguel Martínez Orbañanos (PSOE)

Area
  - Total: 2.60 km^{2} (1.00 sq mi)
- Elevation: 507 m (1,663 ft)

Population (2025-01-01)
  - Total: 319
- Postal code: 26220
- Website: www.ollauri.es

Ollauri is a village in the northwest province and autonomous community of La Rioja, Spain. The municipality covers an area of 2.6 square kilometres (1.0 sq mi) and as of 2011 had a population of 311 people.
