= Areta =

Areta is a surname possibly derived from Greek ἀρετή (arete) meaning "virtue". It is also a given name.

== Surname ==
- Esteban Areta (1932–2007), Spanish footballer
- Luis Felipe Areta (born 1942), Spanish triple jumper

== Given name ==
- Areta Konomi (born 1989), Greek volleyball player
- Areta Koopu (born 1941), New Zealand social worker and activist
- Areta Wilkinson (born 1969), New Zealand jeweller
