= Letona, Álava =

Hamlet in Álava, Spain

Letona
- Concejo
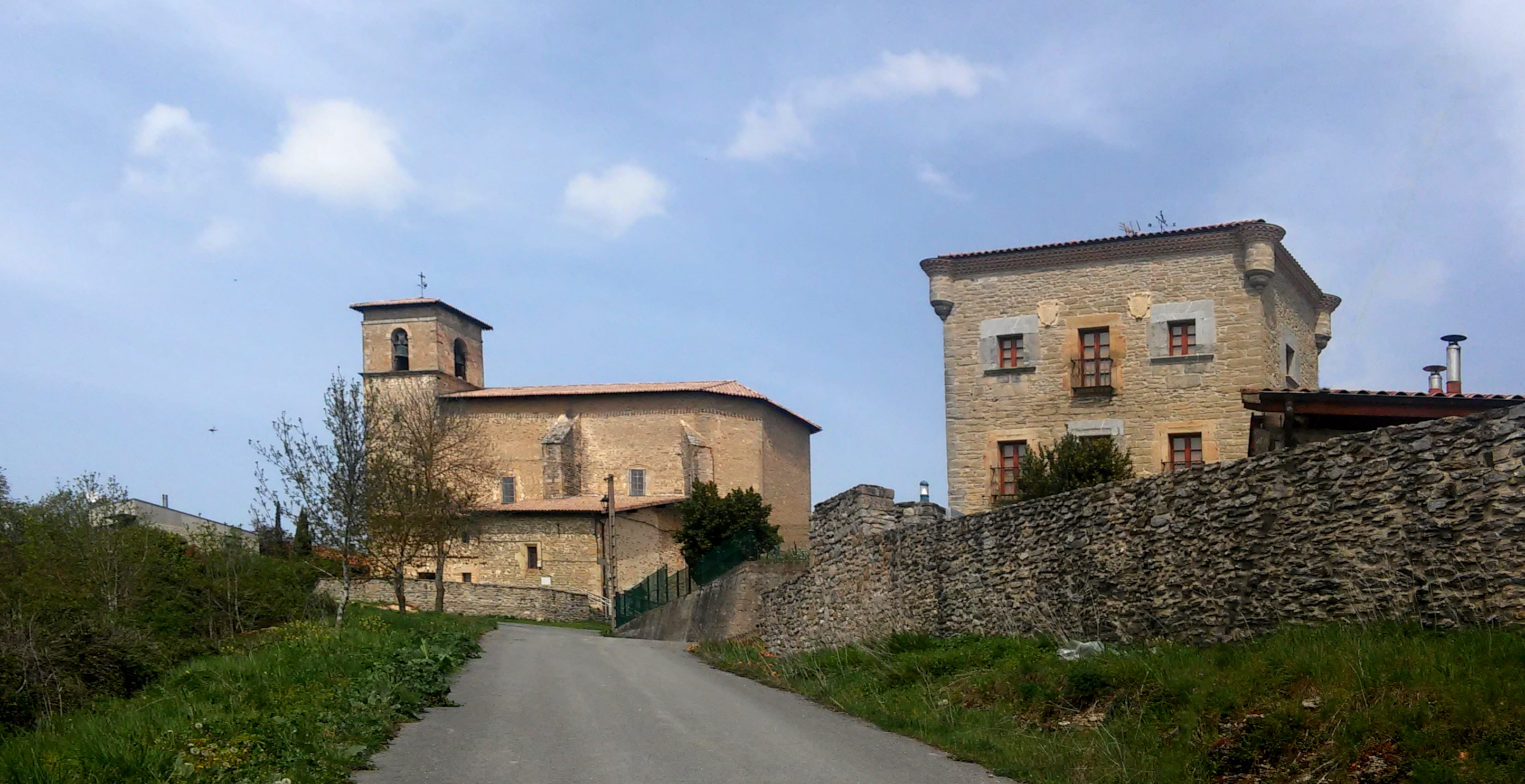
- View of Letona

- Location within Álava Location within the Basque Country Location within Spain
- Coordinates: 42°55′56″N 2°44′54″W
- Country: Spain
- Autonomous community: Basque Country
- Province: Álava
- Comarca: Gorbeialdea
- Municipality: Zigoitia

Area
  - Total: 6.37 km^{2} (2.46 sq mi)
- Elevation: 597 m (1,959 ft)

Population (2021)
  - Total: 44
  - Density: 6.9/km^{2} (18/sq mi)
- Postal code: 01138

Letona (Basque pronunciation: [letona], Spanish pronunciation: [leˈtona]) is a hamlet and concejo located in the municipality of Zigoitia, in Álava province, Basque Country, Spain. It is located 13 km north-northwest of Vitoria-Gasteiz.
