= Acosta, Álava =

Hamlet in Álava, Spain

Acosta/Okoizta
- Concejo
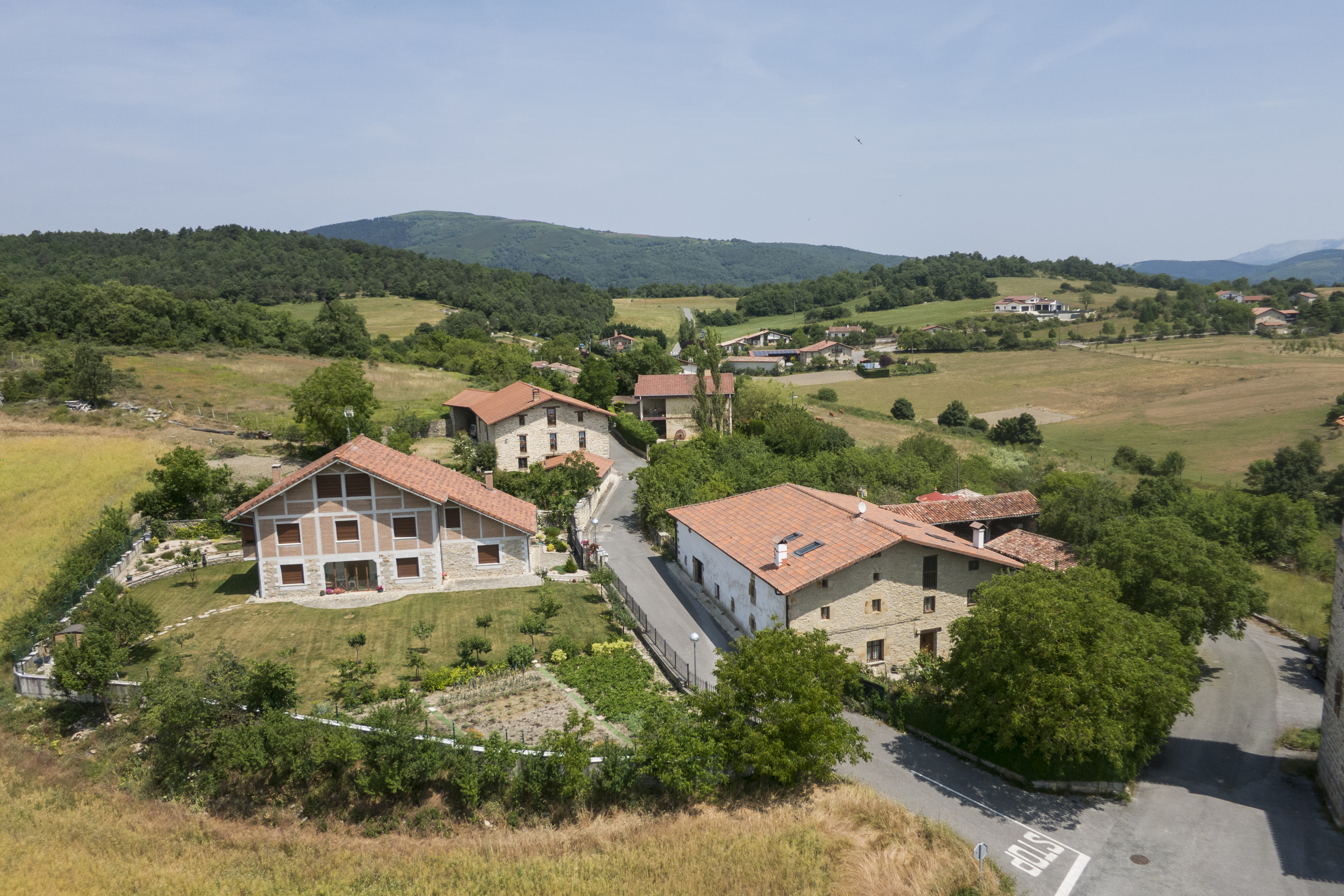

- Location within Álava Location within the Basque Country Location within Spain
- Coordinates: 42°58′27″N 2°42′49″W
- Country: Spain
- Autonomous community: Basque Country
- Province: Álava
- Comarca: Gorbeialdea
- Municipality: Zigoitia

Area
  - Total: 2.01 km^{2} (0.78 sq mi)
- Elevation: 633 m (2,077 ft)

Population (2022)
  - Total: 75
  - Density: 37/km^{2} (97/sq mi)
- Postal code: 01138

Acosta (Spanish pronunciation: [aˈkosta]) or Okoizta (Basque pronunciation: [okois̻ta], alternatively in Basque: Akosta) is a hamlet and concejo located in the municipality of Zigoitia, in Álava province, Basque Country, Spain.
