= Gorbea =

Mountain in the Basque Country, Spain

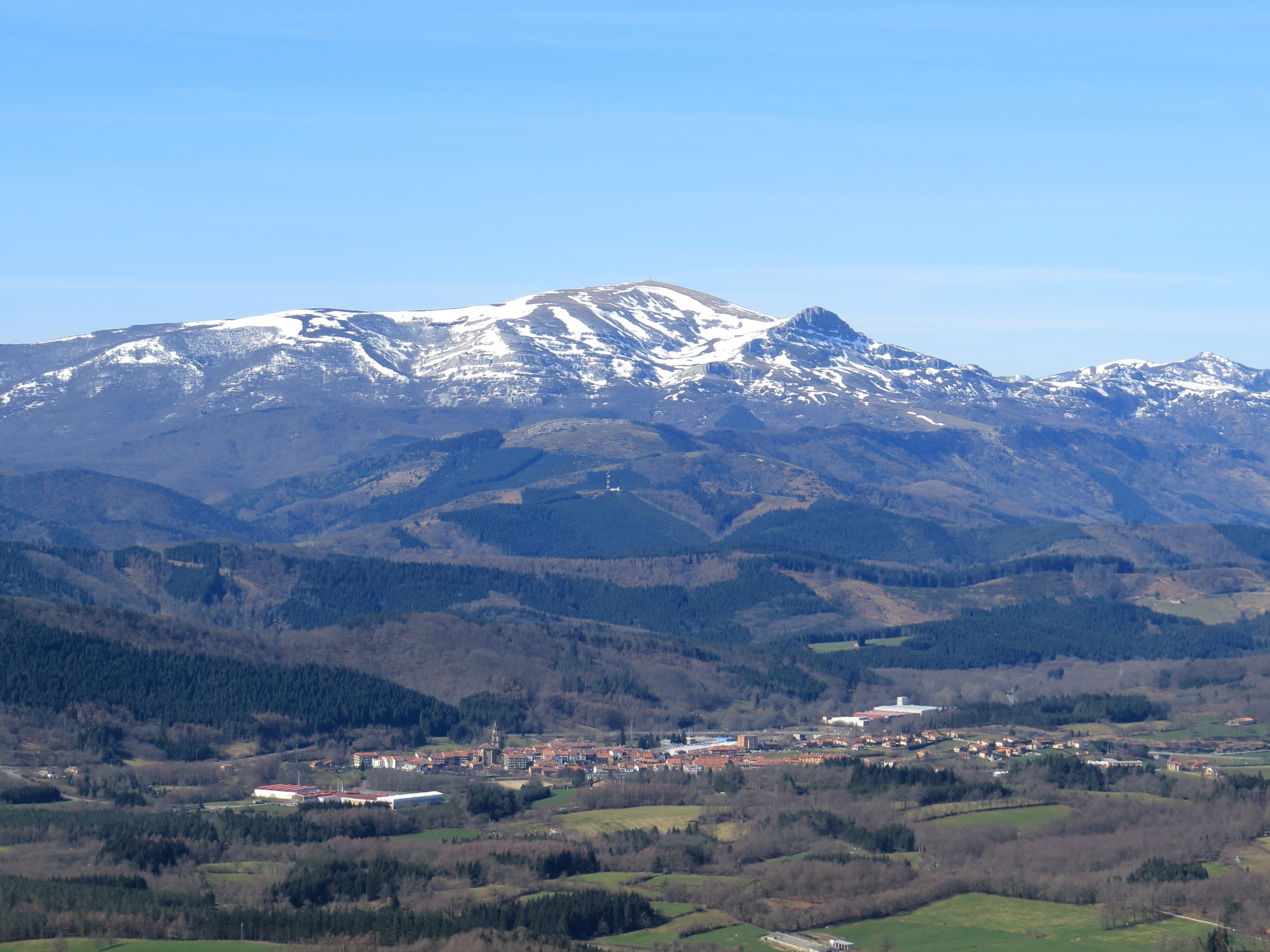
- Gorbea rising over Otxandio

Highest point
- Elevation: 1,482 m (4,862 ft)
- Prominence: 866 m (2,841 ft)
- Isolation: 37.6 km (23.4 mi)
- Coordinates: 43°02′06″N 2°46′48″W

Naming
- Native name: Gorbeia (Basque)

Geography
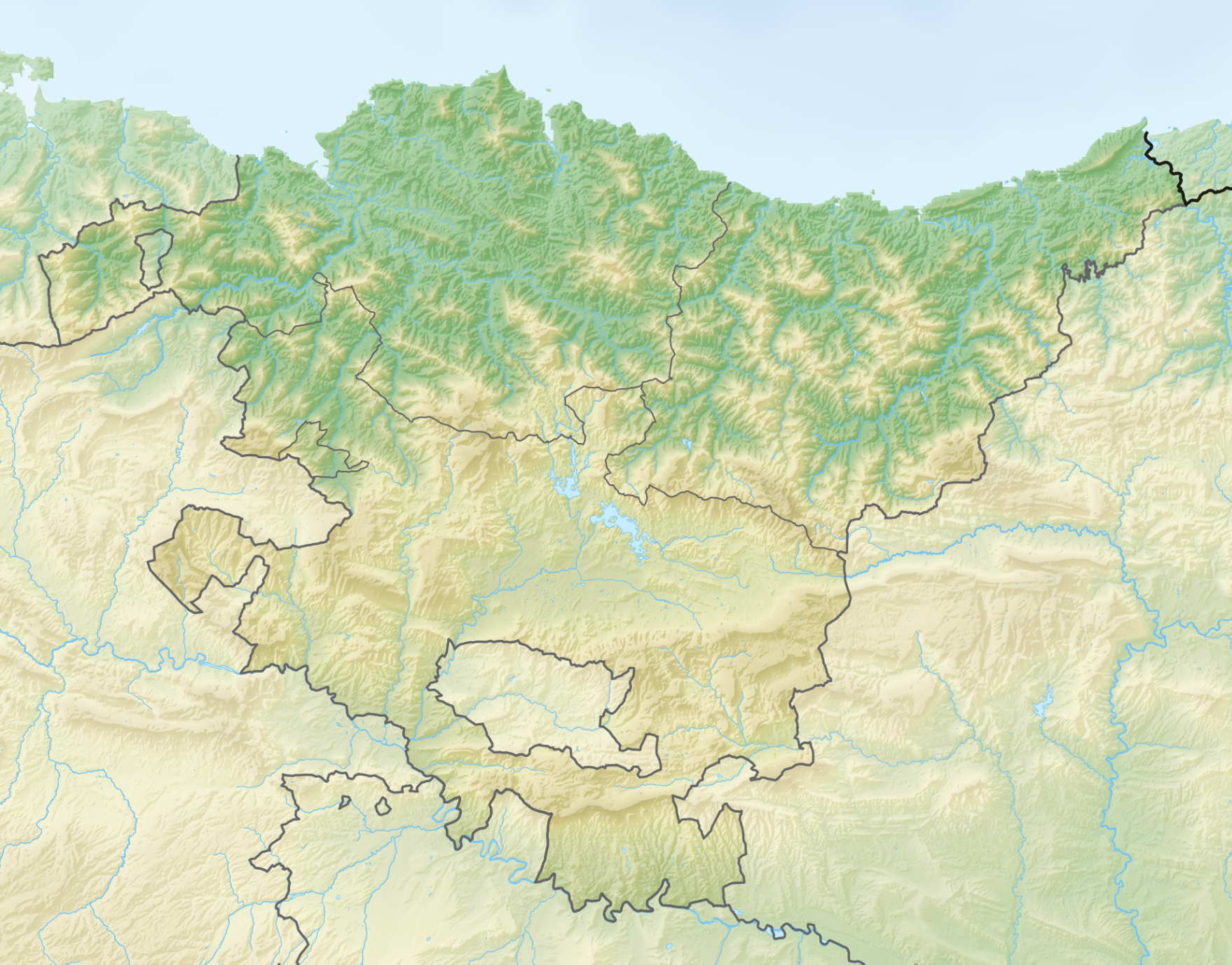
- Location within the Basque Country Location within Spain
- Location: Álava and Biscay, Basque Country, Spain
- Parent range: Basque Mountains

Climbing
- Easiest route: Hike

Gorbea (Spanish pronunciation: [goɾˈβea]) or Gorbeia (Basque pronunciation: [gorβei.a]) is a mountain and massif in the Basque Country, Spain. It is the highest summit in Biscay and Álava, with a height of 1,482 metres (4,862 ft) above sea level. The massif covers a wide area between the two provinces. The main summit is a round grass-covered mountain crowned by a 17-metre-tall metallic cross. Historically, it was one of the five montes bocineros (horning mountains) of Biscay, from where meetings to the Juntas Generales of the Lordship of Biscay were announced.

To the north of the massif lies the karstic plateau of Itxina, an area full of shafts and caves such as Supelegor. The southern side of the mountain is less craggy, being covered by forests. Other notable mountains of the massif are Berretin to the south and the Lekanda and Aldamin limestone peaks to the north.

Since 1994, the whole massif has been part of the Gorbeia Natural Park, established to preserve the local beech and oak forests as well as the populations of wild boars and deer. Its status as the highest summit in two provinces and easy access have made it one of the most emblematic mountains in the Basque Country.

Its popularity among Basque mountaineers, who climb to its summit from all sides, has made it very popular. Its cross, which can be seen from almost every corner of the area, has become a symbol of reference. It is traditional to climb Gorbea on the last and first day of each year, with hundreds of people gathering at the summit to toast with champagne, cava or cider at the cross.

Next to the cross and the Virgin of Begoña, who looks out over Vizcaya, there is a post box where you can leave your mountain competition cards. The post box was installed in 1926 by Athletic Club.

On 14 June 1931, an orientation table was placed there, in the shape of a cylindrical prism 0.80 m in diameter and 1.18 m high, marking 106 mountains (covering mountains up to the central Pyrenees). The project was the brainchild of Lucio Lascaray, who began work on it in 1929. It was installed by the Vitoria mountaineering club. The design on the plaque is by Ángel Aguirre and it was made in the workshops of Puy de Dòme in France.

== Summit cross ==
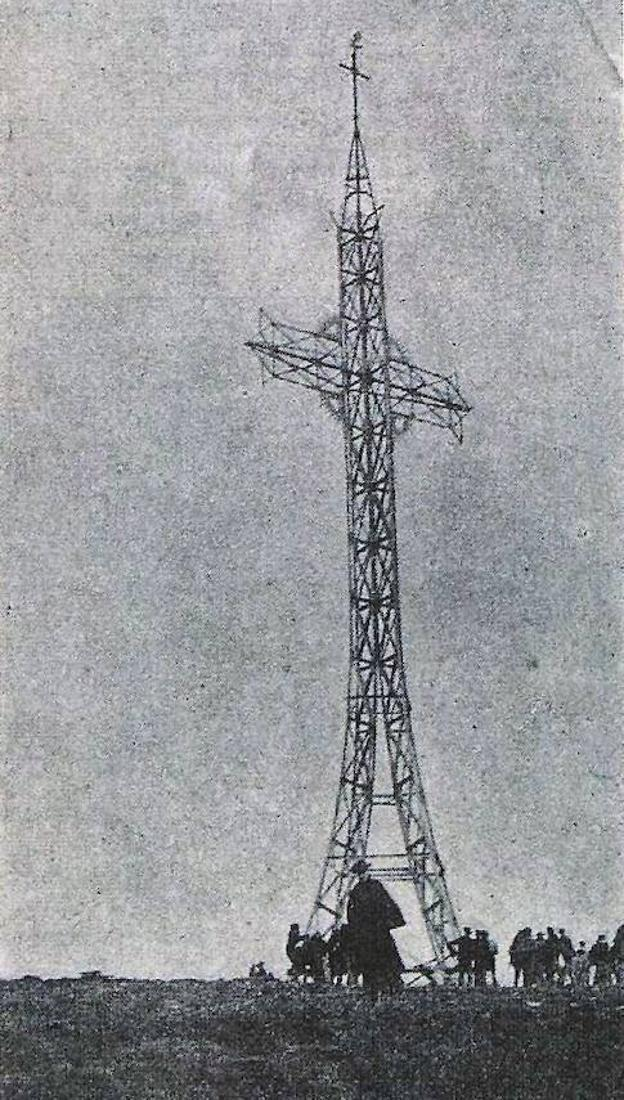
The second cross, circa 1903

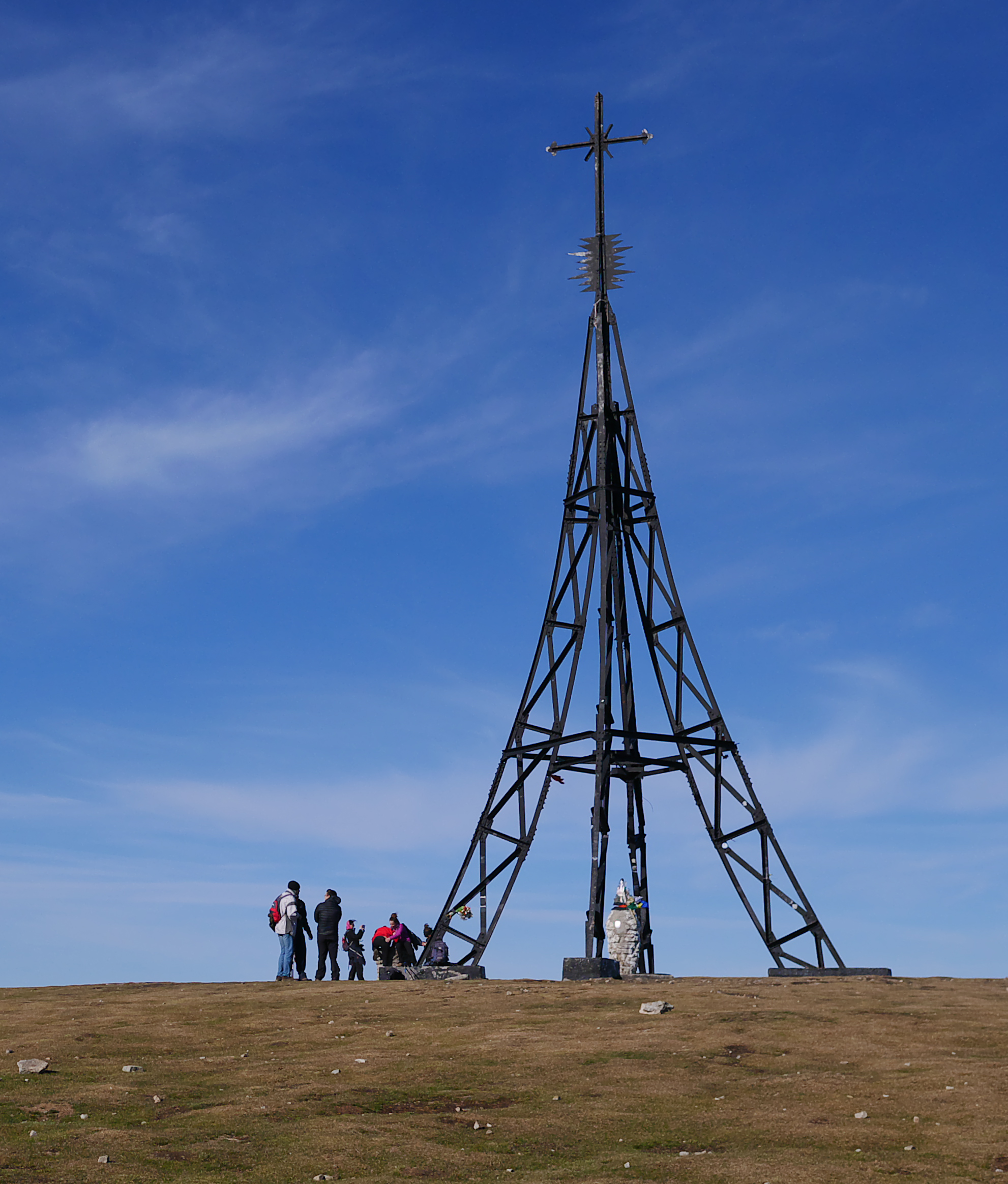
The current cross

=== First cross ===
In 1899, Pope Leo XIII ordered crosses built atop prominent mountains in the Christian world to commemorate the new century. It was decided that a cross would be installed at Gorbea, the highest mountain in Biscay and Álava. The priests of Zeanuri in Biscay and Zigoitia in Álava made the first steps coordinating the construction of the cross. The works, funded by donations, were undertaken by the Diocese of Vitoria. The total budget was of 50,000 pesetas. It was designed by architect Casto de Zavala and built in a factory owned by businessman and politician Serapio de Goicoechea. Works started on 26 July 1901, with the intention of being completed by 14 September (the Feast of the Cross), but it wasn't inaugurated until 12 November.

The construction of the cross was marred with difficulties. The parts of the disassembled cross was hauled by rail to Izarra, and then carried to the summit with the help of working animals. For unknown reasons, the 33.33 metres (109.4 ft) tall cross wasn't built according the plans drawn by Casto de Zavala. The proposed designs included guy-wires to help the structure withstand the strong winds, but due to the hurried construction they weren't added. The crossed collapsed just one month later, on 12 December. Due to the weight of accumulated snow, one of its legs snapped at a height of about 6 metres (20 ft), with the cross falling down the slope and breaking into pieces.

=== Second cross ===
Plans to rebuild the cross started soon after the collapse of the first one. The design was similar to the original. It was inaugurated on 1 October 1903 in a ceremony with a large attendance, which included the blessing of the cross with water from the Jordan River. The second cross lasted for slightly longer than two years, being torn down on 12 February 1906 by the wind.

=== Third cross ===
To avoid the negative impact of the destruction of the first two crosses, the third one was built without publicity. As a result, few details are known about its construction. The cross was finished around 1910, although some sources cite 1907 as either the year in which construction started or was completed. With a height of 17.23 metres (56.5 ft), it is substantially shorter and stronger than the two previous crosses. The cross, reminiscent of the Eiffel Tower in Paris, is supported by four legs which are joined at the top. The two northern legs sit in Biscay while the other two sit in Álava. In June 1963, an image of Our Lady of Begoña was added under the cross. The cross was renovated in 1991 and again in 2019.
