= A-1 (autovía) =

Motorway in Spain

Autovía A-1
- Autovía del Norte
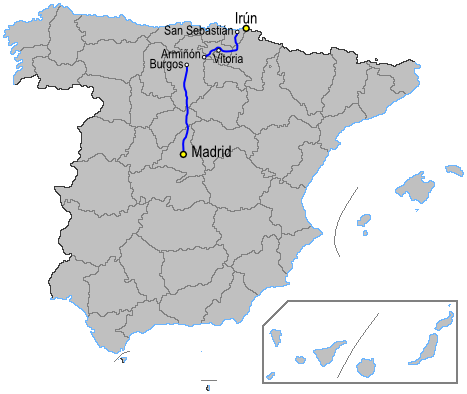

Route information
- Part of E5 / E80
- Length: 371 km (231 mi)

Major junctions
- From: Madrid
- To: Irun

Location
- Country: Spain

Highway system
- Highways in Spain; Autopistas and autovías; National Roads

The A-1 (also informally known as Autovía del Norte; Basque: Iparraldeko Autobia) is a Spanish autovía route which starts in Madrid and ends in Irun. It replaced the former national road from Madrid to France, the N-1 road. It carries the designation of European route E05, and, as one of the major north–south arteries of Spain, is one of the country's busiest highways.

Between Burgos and Armiñón there is an alternative for this autovía, no longer toll, the autopista AP-1.

In 2011, work was ongoing to bring the section between Burgos and Madrid up to modern standards.

== Sections ==
Autovía A-1 currently has two sections: one between Madrid and Burgos and another between Miranda de Ebro and Alsasua. Traffic through the 49.6 km discontinuity between Burgos and Miranda de Ebro is redirected to the N-I. Beyond Altsasu, traffic continues on the N-I to the French border.

| # | From | To | Length | Designation |
|---|---|---|---|---|
| 1 | Madrid | Venturada | 50.11 km | A-1 |
| 2 | Venturada | Santo Tomé del Puerto | | A-1 |
| 3 | Santo Tomé del Puerto | Aranda de Duero | 106.24 km | A-1 |
| 4 | Aranda de Duero | Lerma, Burgos | 42.91 km | A-1 |
| 5 | Lerma, Burgos | Burgos | 37.41 km | A-1 |
| 6 | Burgos | Armiñón | 87.35 km | N-I |
| 7 | Armiñón | Vitoria-Gasteiz | 27.16 km | N-I |
| 8 | Vitoria-Gasteiz | Altsasu/Alsasua | 46.69 km | N-I, A-1 |
| 9 | Altsasu/Alsasua | Idiazabal | 16.05 km | A-1 |
| 10 | Idiazabal | San Sebastián | 45.94 km | N-I |
| 11 | San Sebastián | Irun | 21.58 km | N-I |

== Major cities crossed ==
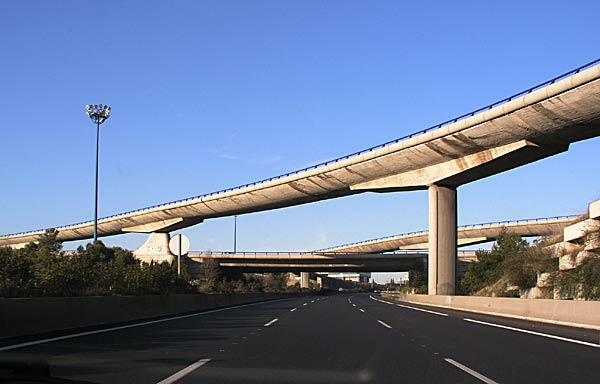
Autovía A-1

- Madrid
- Aranda de Duero
- Burgos
- Vitoria-Gasteiz
- San Sebastián
- Irun
