= Etxabarri Ibiña =

Hamlet in Álava, Spain

- Concejo
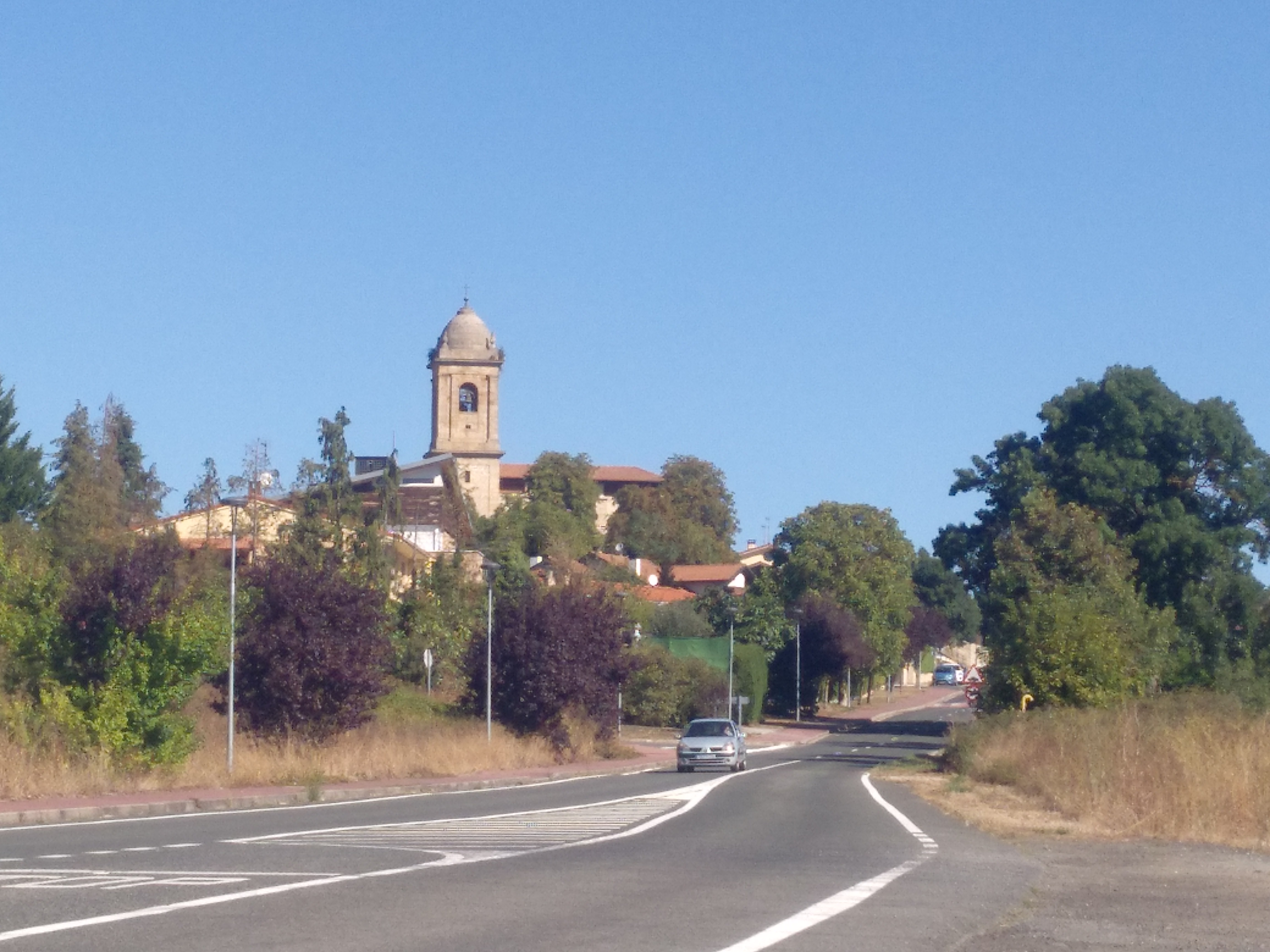
- View of Etxabarri Ibiña

- Location within Álava Location within the Basque Country Location within Spain
- Coordinates: 42°54′58″N 2°42′33″W
- Country: Spain
- Autonomous community: Basque Country
- Province: Álava
- Comarca: Gorbeialdea
- Municipality: Zigoitia

Area
  - Total: 6.20 km^{2} (2.39 sq mi)
- Elevation: 560 m (1,840 ft)

Population (2021)
  - Total: 315
  - Density: 50.8/km^{2} (132/sq mi)
- Postal code: 01196

Etxabarri Ibiña (Basque pronunciation: [etʃaβari iβiɲa], also in Basque: Etxabarri Dibiña, Spanish: Echávarri-Viña [eˈtʃaβari ˈβiɲa]) is a hamlet and concejo located in the municipality of Zigoitia, in Álava province, Basque Country, Spain. The Gorbeia shopping mall is located in the hamlet, it mainly serves the nearby city of Vitoria-Gasteiz.
