= Zigoitia =

Municipality in Spain

- Municipality
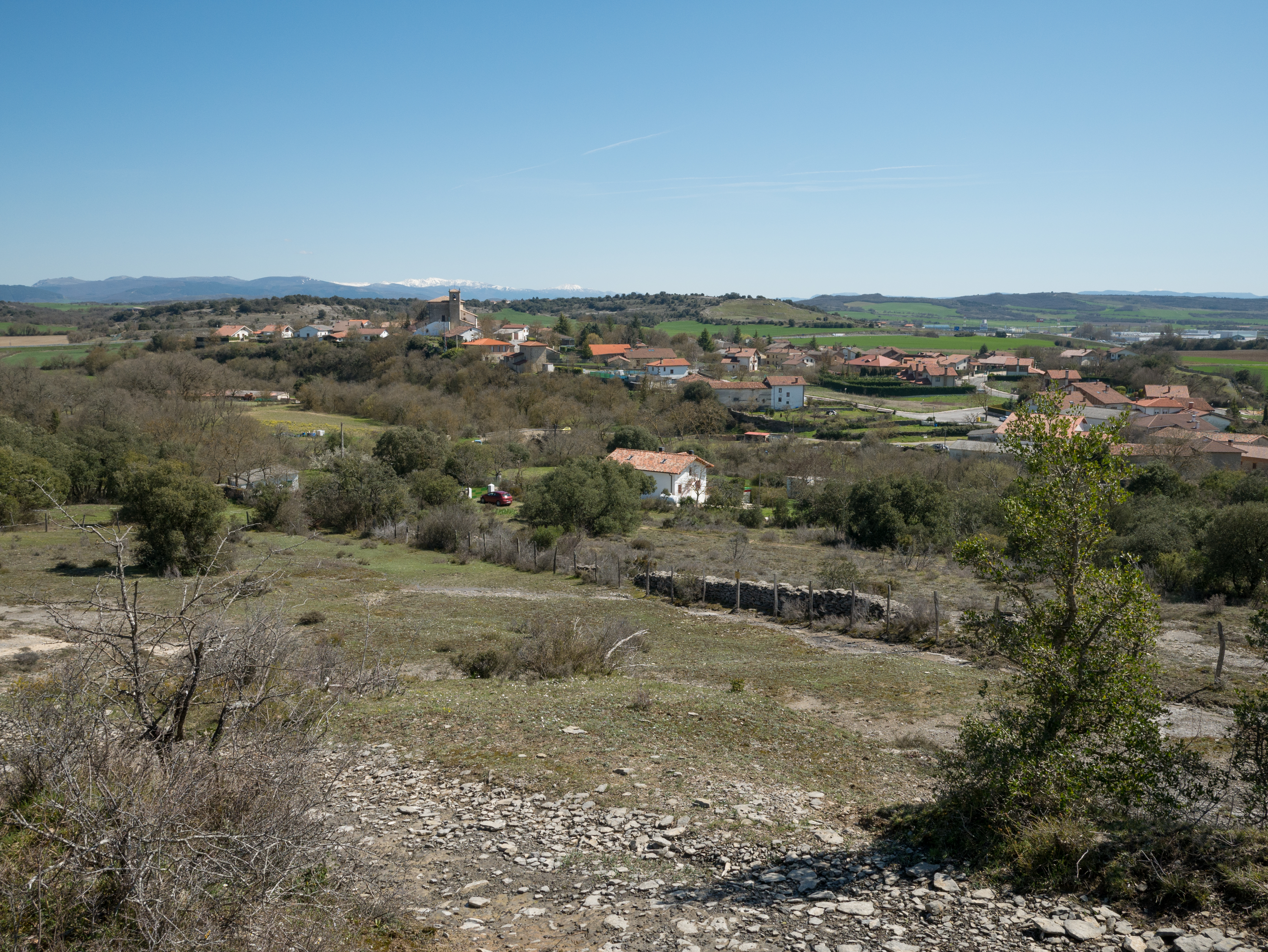
- View of Apodaka, Zigoitia

- Location in Spain Zigoitia (the Basque Country) Zigoitia (Spain)
- Coordinates: 42°58′6″N 2°43′41″W
- Country: Spain
- Autonomous community: Basque Country
- Province: Álava
- Comarca: Gorbeialdea

Government
  - Mayor: Javier Gorbeña García (EAJ/PNV)

Area
  - Total: 102.07 km^{2} (39.41 sq mi)
- Elevation: 600 m (2,000 ft)

Population (2025-01-01)
  - Total: 1,845
  - Density: 18.08/km^{2} (46.82/sq mi)
- Postal code: 01138, 01196
- Website: https://www.zigoitia.eus/

Zigoitia (Basque pronunciation: [s̻iɣoiti.a], Spanish: Cigoitia [θiˈɣojtja]) is a municipality in the province of Álava, in the Basque Country, northern Spain. Its capital is the village of Ondategi. In 2013 the largest common grave from the Spanish Civil War in the Basque Country was excavated in the locality.

== Toponymy ==
The name Zigoitia is usually described as consisting of the Basque elements zuhi- (an aspirated variant of zubi, meaning "bridge") and goitia "upper". The toponym Zuffia de suso, meaning "Upper Zuffia", is attested in the medieval Reja de San Millán; while the neighboring municipality of Zuia, located in a valley, corresponds to Zuffia de yuso, meaning "Lower Zuffia".

Zigoitia is the form of the name in standard Basque orthography. It was adopted in 1995 by the municipal council, and published by the Boletín Oficial del Estado on 13 September 1996.

== Geography ==
=== Administrative subdivisions ===
The municipality contains 17 villages. All of them are organized into concejos with the exception of Larrinoa.

Official name	Basque name	Spanish name	Population (2021)	Area (km^{2})	Notes
Acosta/Okoizta	Okoizta	Acosta	71	2.01	Concejo
Apodaka	Apodaka	Apodaca	155	7.16	Concejo
Berrikano	Berrikano	Berrícano	148	3.41	Concejo
Buruaga	Buruaga	Buruaga	48	5.01	Concejo
Diseminado/Sakabanatua	Sakabanatua	Diseminado	14	–	Isolated houses not belonging to other settlements.
Eribe	Eribe	Eribe	63	3.72	Concejo
Etxabarri Ibiña	Etxabarri Ibiña	Echávarri-Viña	315	6.20	Concejo
Etxaguen	Etxaguen	Echagüen	80	1.53	Concejo
Gopegi	Gopegi	Gopegui	280	2.35	Concejo
Larrinoa	Larrinoa	Larrínoa	34	–	
Letona	Letona	Letona	44	6.37	Concejo
Manurga	Manurga	Manurga	80	4.47	Concejo
Mendarozketa	Mendarozketa	Mendarózqueta	43	3.18	Concejo
Murua	Murua	Murúa	153	1.94	Concejo
Olano	Olano	Olano	24	3.05	Concejo
Ondategi	Ondategi	Ondátegui	169	4.09	Concejo, capital of the municipality
Zaitegi	Zaitegi	Záitegui	44	4.04	Concejo
Zestafe	Zestafe	Cestafe	37	1.80	Concejo

== See also ==
- Cave of Zubialde
