= Armiñón =

Town and municipality in Álava, Basque Country, Spain

- Municipality
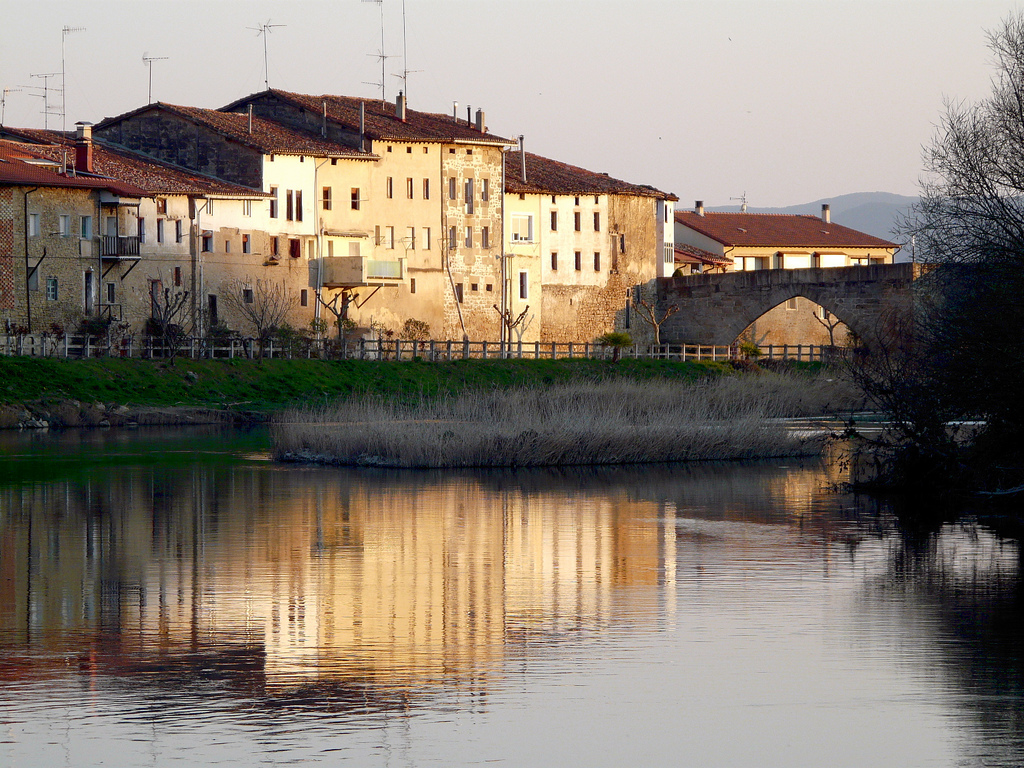

- Coat of arms

- Location of Armiñón within the Basque Country
- Coordinates: 42°43′N 2°52′W
- Country: Spain
- Autonomous Community: Basque Country
- Province: Álava
- Comarca: Cuadrilla de Añana

Government
  - Mayor: Gorka Meana Marcos

Area
  - Total: 10.6 km^{2} (4.1 sq mi)
- Elevation (AMSL): 462 m (1,516 ft)

Population (2025-01-01)
  - Total: 236
  - Density: 22.3/km^{2} (57.7/sq mi)
- Time zone: UTC+1 (CET)
  - Summer (DST): UTC+2 (CEST (GMT +2))
- Postal code: 01220
- Website: www.cuadrilladeanana.es/arminon

Armiñon is a town and municipality located in the province of Álava, in the Basque Country, northern Spain. The municipality also includes the towns of Estavillo and Lacorzana.
