= Sanctuary of Our Lady of Oro =

Church in Zuia, Spain

- Santuario de Nuestra Señora de Oro (Spanish) Oroko Andre Mariaren Santutegia (Basque)
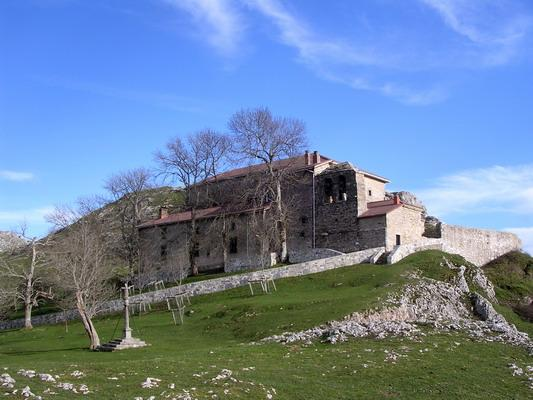
- View of the sanctuary in wintertime
- Sanctuary of Our Lady of Oro
- 42.9314°N 2.8275°W
- Location: Zuia, Álava, Basque Country
- Country: Spain
- Denomination: Catholic Church
- Tradition: Latin Church

Administration
- Archdiocese: Archidiocese of Burgos
- Diocese: Diocese of Vitoria

The Sanctuary of Our Lady of Oro (Spanish: Santuario de Nuestra Señora de Oro, Basque: Oroko Andre Mariaren Santutegia) is a place of worship in the Zuia Valley of northern Spain. It is about 3.5 kilometres (2.2 mi) from Murgia, in the center of the valley. Its altitude is 841 metres (2,759 ft) above sea level. From Murgia, the road towards Vitoriano reaches the sanctuary. The first known document mentioning it dates to 1138.

== History ==
A prehistoric settlement was found at the site in 1918 by Jose Migel Barandiaran. Local archeologists conducted four excavations from 1964 to 1967, and found evidence of human habitation in three eras. The oldest dates to the late Bronze Age (850-700 BC). A later community inhabited the area from 450 to 350 BC, followed by settlement during the later Roman Empire.

The sanctuary probably dates from the late 11th century to the 12th century, although nothing remains from the original Romanesque church. This is supported by the fact that the nearby settlements of Domaikia, Markina and Gillerna have Romanesque churches, as well as the Madonna housed in the sanctuary being of Romanesque style. The main church vaults were apparently constructed from the end of the 14th to the 15th century, with false plaster vaults in the sacristy dating to 1771.

The church's Baroque altar, built by Antonio de Alvarado in 1691, was preserved after the 1964 renovation and the medieval statue of Our Lady of Oro was restored in 1930. There are two chapels, one dating to 1638 and the other to 1761.
