= Aperregi =

Hamlet in Álava, Spain

- Concejo
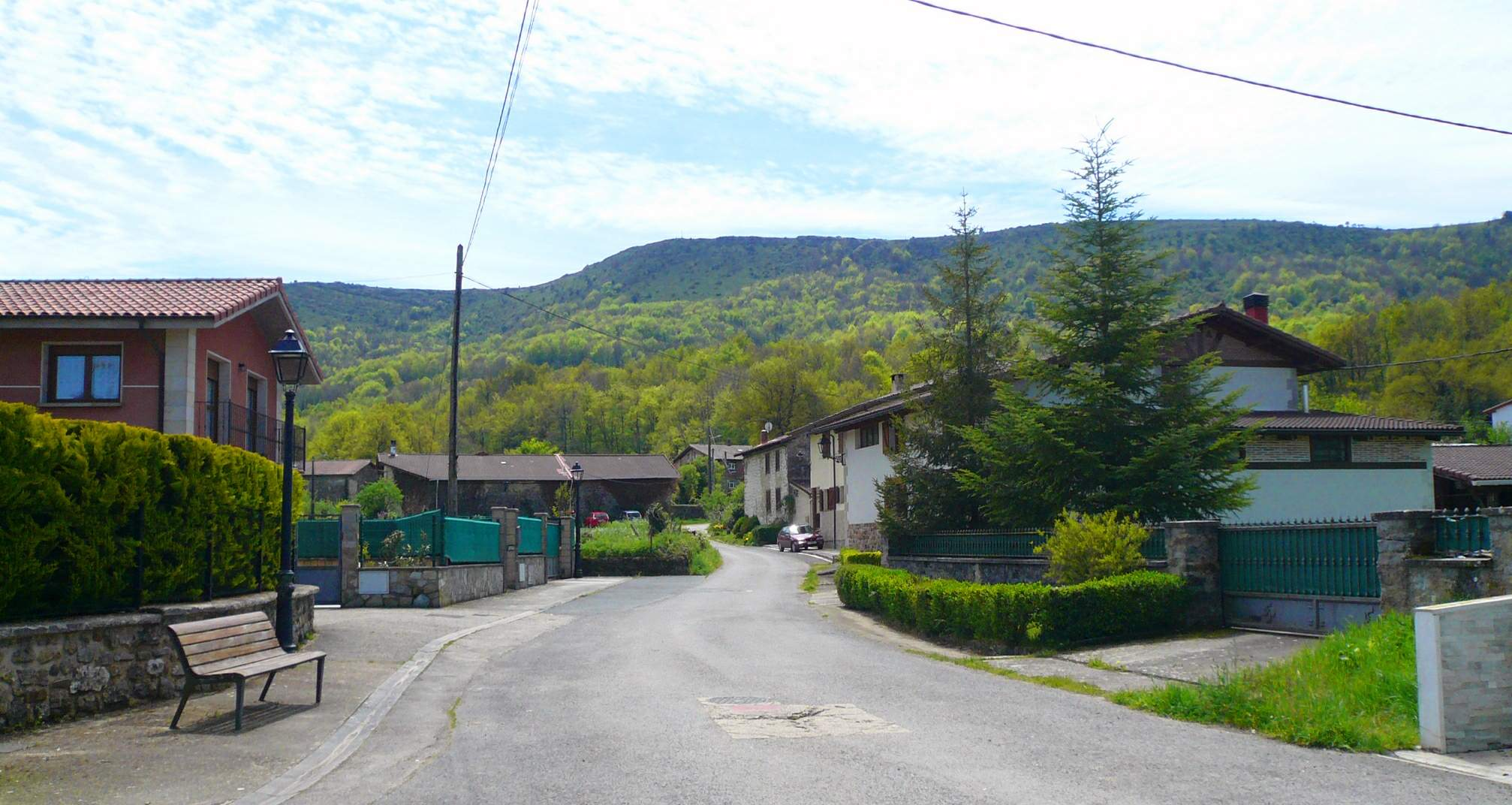
- A street in Aperregi

- Coat of arms

- Location within Álava Location within the Basque Country Location within Spain
- Coordinates: 42°55′24″N 2°50′33″W
- Country: Spain
- Autonomous community: Basque Country
- Province: Álava
- Comarca: Gorbeialdea
- Municipality: Zuia

Area
  - Total: 4.77 km^{2} (1.84 sq mi)
- Elevation: 627 m (2,057 ft)

Population (2021)
  - Total: 39
  - Density: 8.2/km^{2} (21/sq mi)
- Postal code: 01191

Aperregi (Basque pronunciation: [apereɣi], Spanish: Aperregui [apeˈreɣi]) is a hamlet and concejo located in the municipality of Zuia, in Álava province, Basque Country, Spain. It lies between Lukiano and Domaikia.
