= Ullíbarri-Gamboa Reservoir =

Reservoir in the Basque Country, Spain

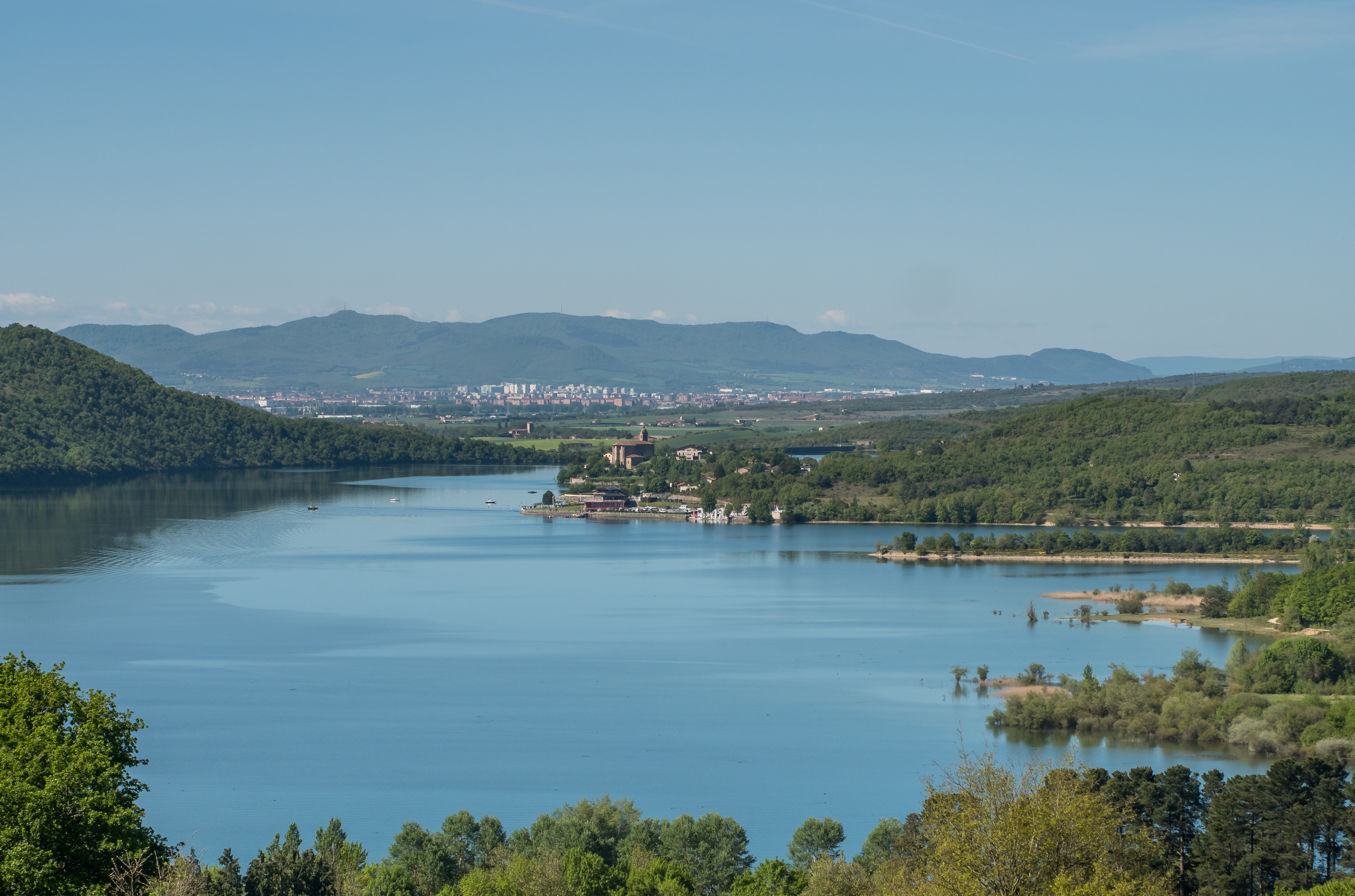
- View of the reservoir

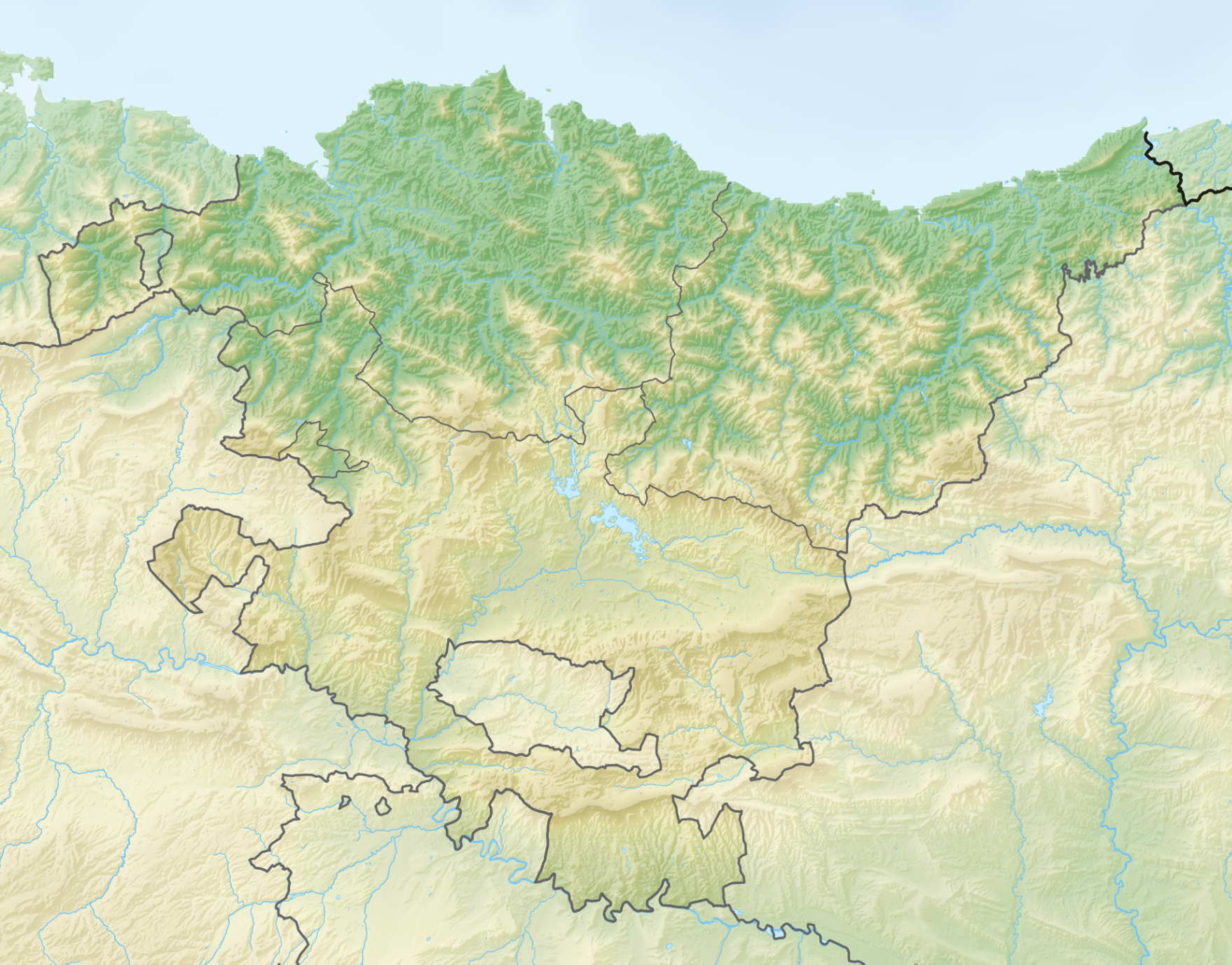
- Location within the Basque Country Ullíbarri-Gamboa Reservoir (Spain)
- Country: Spain
- Location: Álava, Basque Country
- Coordinates: 42.93°N 2.62°W
- Opening date: 31 December 1957

Dam and spillways
- Height: 37 m (121 ft)
- Length: 543 m (1,781 ft)
- Elevation at crest: 548 m (1,798 ft)
- S pillway volumetric flow rate: 6,800 m^{3}/s (240,000 cu ft/s)

Reservoir
- Total capacity: 147.2 hm^{3} (119,300 acre⋅ft)
- Catchment area: 274 km^{2} (106 sq mi)
- Surface area: 16.95 km^{2} (6.54 sq mi)
- Normal elevation: 546.5 m (1,793 ft)

Ramsar Wetland
- Official name: Colas del Embalse de Ullibarri
- Designated: 24 October 2002
- Reference no.: 1255
- Area: 397 ha (980 acres)

Natura 2000 site (SAC)
- Designated: June 2015
- Part of: Zadorraren sistemako urtegiak / Embalses del sistema del Zadorra
- Reference no.: ES2110011

The Ullíbarri-Gamboa Reservoir (Basque: Uribarri Ganboako urtegia, Spanish: Embalse de Ullíbarri-Gamboa) is located in Álava, Basque Country, Spain. With a total capacity of 147.2 hm^{3} (5.20×10^{9} cu ft), it is the largest reservoir in the Basque Country. Together with the nearby Urrunaga Reservoir, it provides water to the nearby city of Vitoria-Gasteiz and to Bilbao and its metropolitan area. The whole reservoir has been designated as a Natura 2000 site, and the southeastern end of the reservoir is also protected as a Ramsar wetland. It is also a popular leisure area, particularly for hiking and bathing.

== History ==
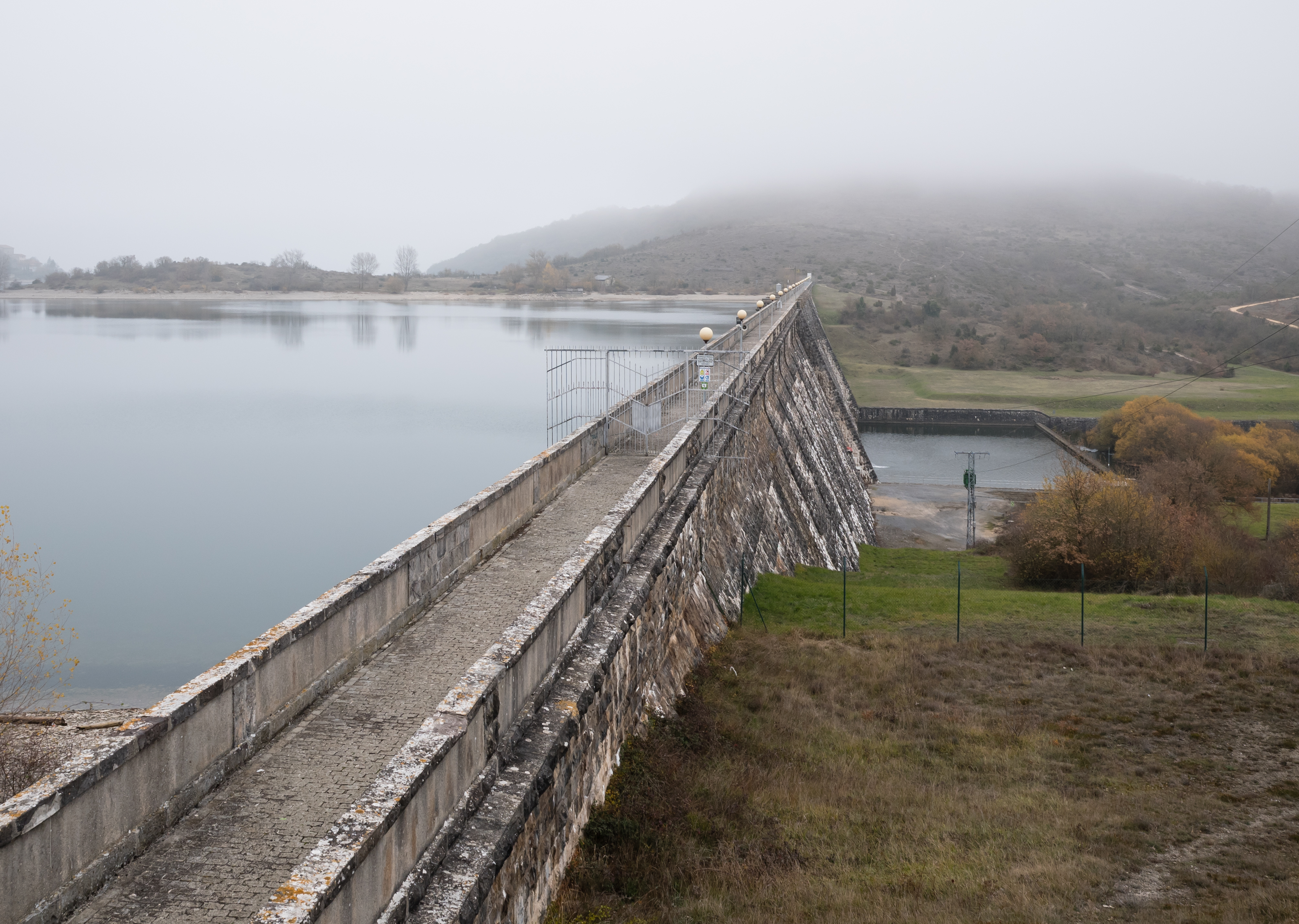
Concrete dam of the reservoir

The first proposal for a reservoir system in the Zadorra river was made by Manuel Uribe-Echevarría in 1926. A concession for the construction of the reservoir was granted by the government in 1935. The concession was taken over by Altos Hornos de Vizcaya in 1945 and by its subsidiary Saltos y Aguas del Zadorra in 1947. The construction of the dam started that year and lasted until 1957.

The reservoir flooded the former valley and municipality of Gamboa, which was formally dissolved in 1957. The settlements of Mendizabal and Zuazo de Gamboa were completely flooded. Ullíbarri-Gamboa and Nanclares de Gamboa were partially submerged but still exist, while Landa was reduced to the station neighborhood. Urizar and Azua were reduced to a few houses each. Orenin wasn't flooded but became an island and was subsequently depopulated. Garaio wasn't flooded either but the lack of arable land resulted in the remaining inhabitants leaving by the early 1960s. The inhabitants of the flooded settlements received eviction letters in the summer of 1957, giving them ten days to leave their homes. Many of them hadn't been compensated yet, so a moratorium was requested. The official response was that the filling of the reservoir would continue as planned. The filling began in January 1958, thus forcing the remaining inhabitants to leave.

The fauna and the flora were also affected by these changes. Some plants were broken and drowned by the water while others adapted to the aquatic life and some seaweed developed. With the time this ecosystem has turned in an aquatic ecosystem and it became a Ramsar Site and part of the Natura 2000 network.

== Islands and recreation ==
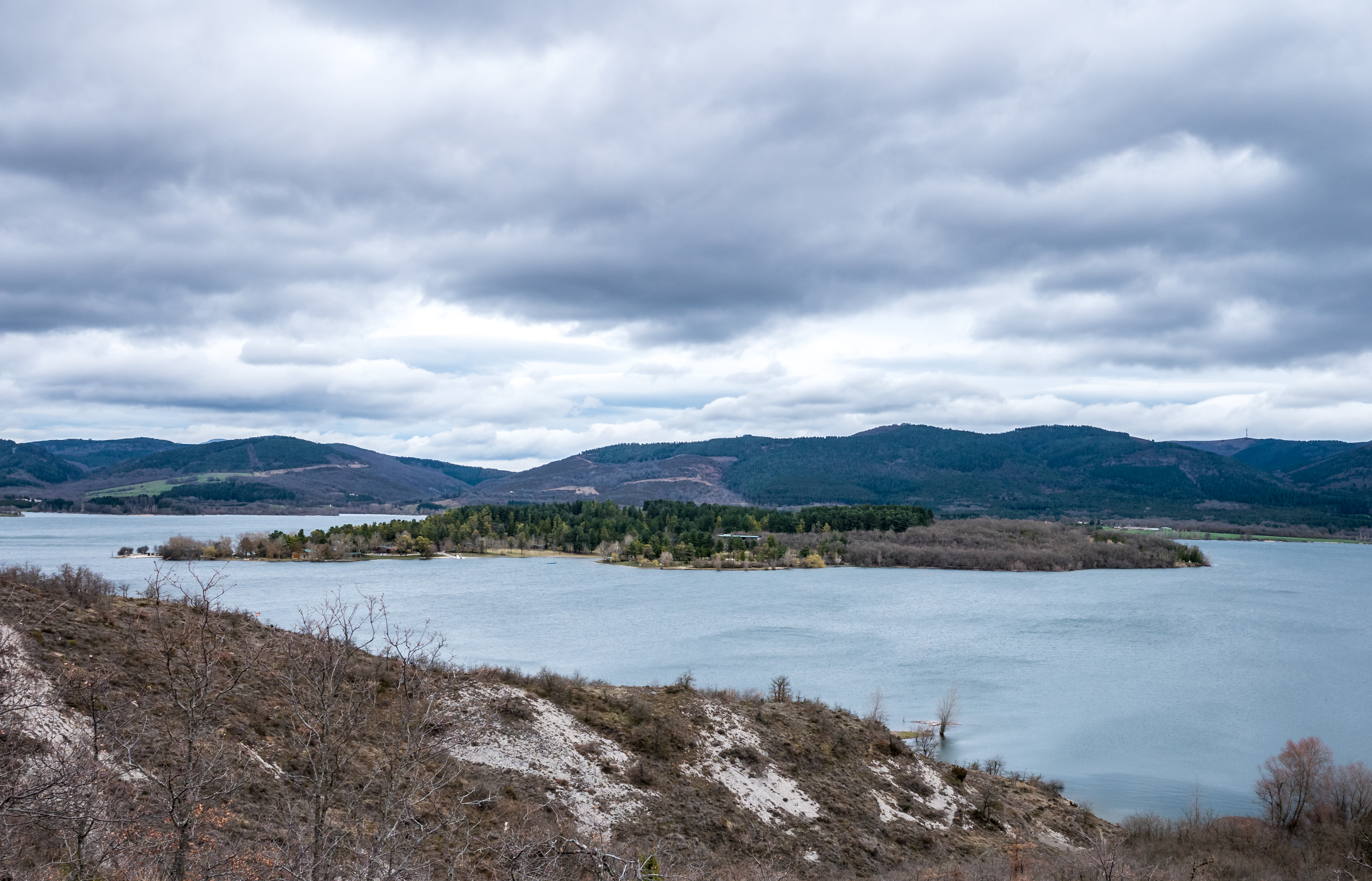
Zuaza Island

There are three islands in the reservoir: Zuhatza, isla de los Caballos and Orenin. Zuhatza, known popularly as isla de los conejos (lit. 'rabbit island'), is the site of a youth hostel; isla de los Caballos is a small islet located next to it. Orenin is a former hamlet which became depopulated after the construction of the reservoir turned it into an island.

The surroundings of Landa and Garaio have been turned into recreational areas with beaches: Landa, Moskurio (Garaio north) and Salurriaga (Garaio south); all of which are Blue Flag certified as of 2023. They tend to be busy during the summer, and there is a recurrent lack of parking space during high season. The Mendijur Ornithological Park, located in the eastern end of the reservoir, is a birdwatching site with adapted paths and two observatories. There is a 44 km (27 mi) circular hiking trail around the reservoir. The reservoir is also a popular site for sailing.

== Supply ==
Currently, the reservoir supplies water for half of the population of the Basque Country. More than 800 litres per second (28 cu ft/s) for Vitoria-Gasteiz are pumped from a pumping station near Ullíbarri-Gamboa. The water supply for Bilbao (obtained from the connected Urrunaga Reservoir) is used to power the Barazar power station. Furthermore, the reservoir is used to control the flooding of the Zadorra river.
