= Aretxaga =

Hamlet in Álava, Spain

- Neighborhood
- Location within Álava Location within the Basque Country Location within Spain
- Coordinates: 42°57′46″N 2°48′32″W
- Country: Spain
- Autonomous community: Basque Country
- Province: Álava
- Comarca: Gorbeialdea
- Municipality: Zigoitia
- Concejo: Murgia
- Postal code: 01130

Aretxaga (Spanish: Arechaga) is a settlement in the municipality of Zuia, in Álava province, Basque Country, Spain. Formerly a village, Aretxaga is now a neighborhood of Murgia.
