= Murgia, Álava =

Village in Álava, Spain

Murgia
- Concejo
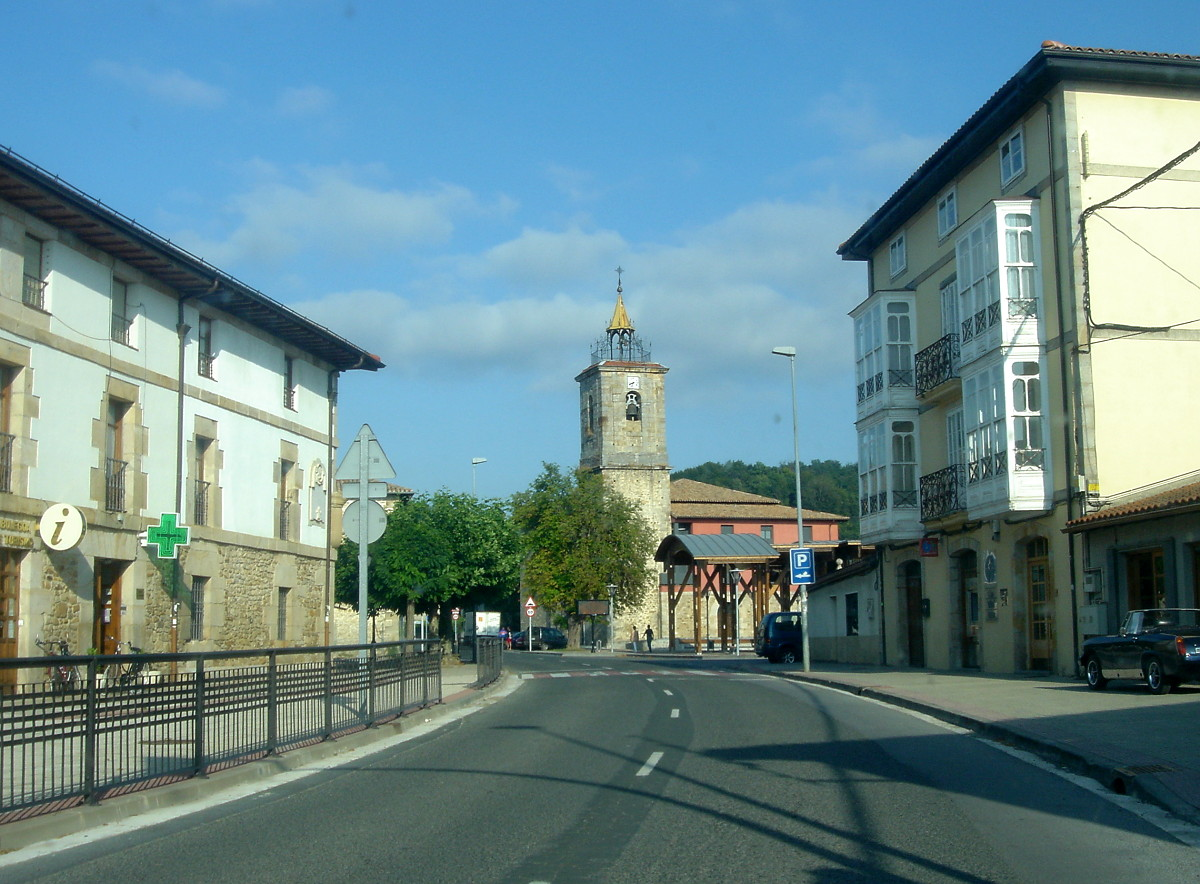
- View of the main street

- Coat of arms

- Location within Álava Location within the Basque Country Location within Spain
- Coordinates: 42°57′25″N 2°49′15″W
- Country: Spain
- Autonomous community: Basque Country
- Province: Álava
- Comarca: Gorbeialdea
- Municipality: Zuia

Area
  - Total: 5.78 km^{2} (2.23 sq mi)
- Elevation: 618 m (2,028 ft)

Population (2021)
  - Total: 1,105
  - Density: 191/km^{2} (495/sq mi)
- Postal code: 01130

Murgia (Basque pronunciation: [murɣi.a], Spanish: Murguía [muɾˈɣi.a]) is a village and concejo located in the municipality of Zuia, in Álava province, Basque Country, Spain. It is the capital of the municipality as well as of the Cuadrilla de Gorbeialdea.

The main road in the village is Domingo de Sautu Street. The Goba River separates a neighborhood called The Cross from the centre of the village. To the north is Sarria, to the northeast Zarate, to the southeast Jugo, to the southwest Bitoriano, and to the west Ametzaga.

== Demographics ==
Historical populations of Murgia
| Year | Pop. | ±% p.a. |
|---|---|---|
| 2000 | 704 | — |
| 2001 | 789 | +12.07% |
| 2002 | 875 | +10.90% |
| 2003 | 1,016 | +16.11% |
| 2004 | 1,086 | +6.89% |
| 2005 | 1,113 | +2.49% |
| 2006 | 1,134 | +1.89% |
| 2007 | 1,169 | +3.09% |
| 2008 | 1,157 | −1.03% |
| 2009 | 1,181 | +2.07% |
| 2010 | 1,190 | +0.76% |
| 2011 | 1,201 | +0.92% |
| 2012 | 1,179 | −1.83% |
| 2013 | 1,186 | +0.59% |
| 2014 | 1,188 | +0.17% |
| 2015 | 1,158 | −2.53% |
| 2016 | 1,139 | −1.64% |
| 2017 | 1,117 | −1.93% |
| 2018 | 1,118 | +0.09% |
| 2019 | 1,099 | −1.70% |
| 2020 | 1,098 | −0.09% |
| 2021 | 1,105 | +0.64% |

== Notable people ==
- Mikel Landa (born 1989), cyclist
- Unai Simón (born 1997), footballer
