= Arroiabe =

Hamlet in Álava, Spain

- Concejo
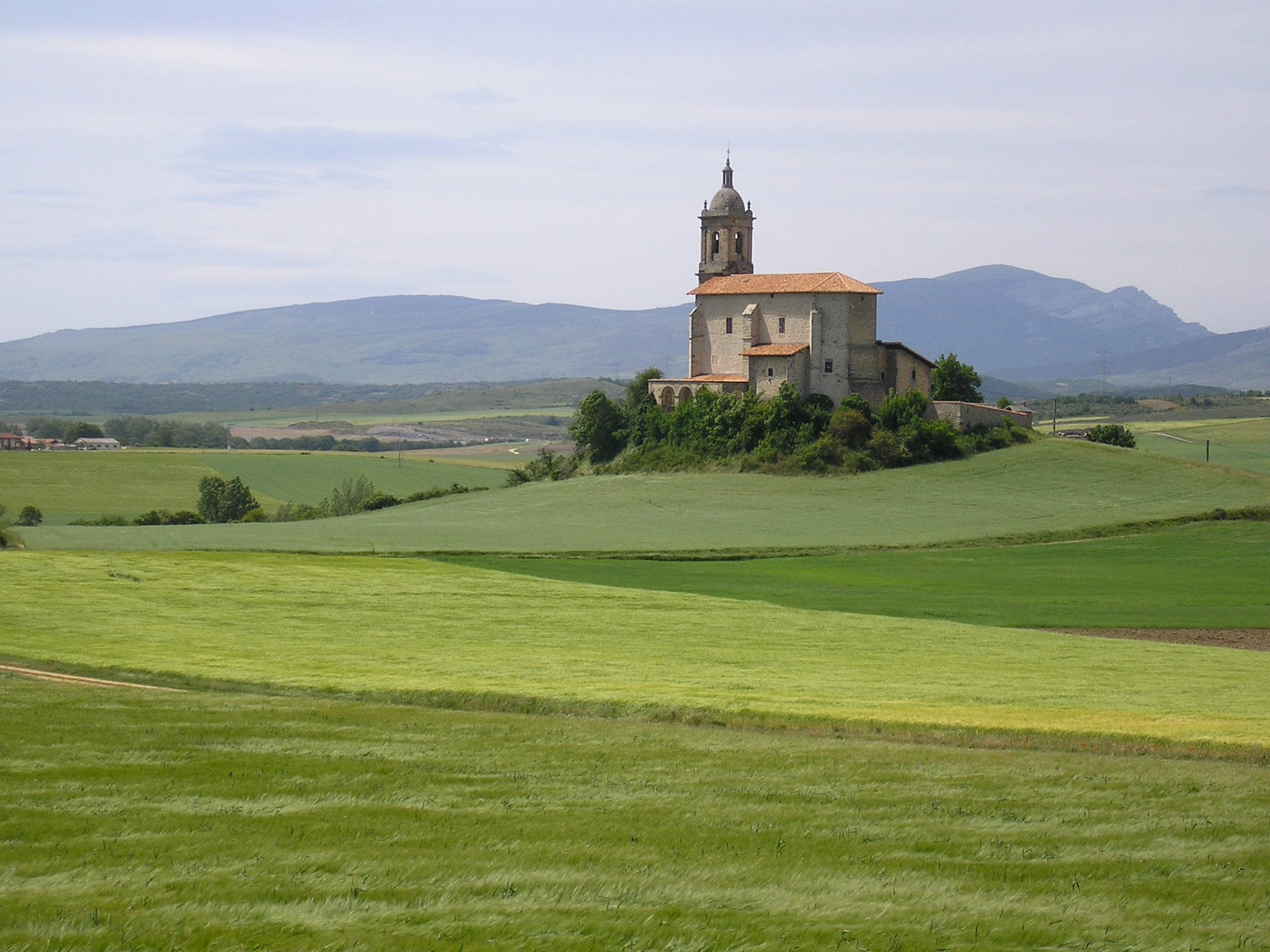
- The parish church as seen from Mendibil

- Location within Álava Location within the Basque Country Location within Spain
- Coordinates: 42°55′N 2°37′W
- Country: Spain
- Autonomous community: Basque Country
- Province: Álava
- Comarca: Gorbeialdea
- Municipality: Arratzua-Ubarrundia

Area
  - Total: 4.70 km^{2} (1.81 sq mi)
- Elevation: 537 m (1,762 ft)

Population (2021)
  - Total: 91
  - Density: 19/km^{2} (50/sq mi)
- Postal code: 01520

Arroiabe (Basque pronunciation: [aroi.aβe], Spanish: Arroyabe [aˈroʝaβe]) is a hamlet and concejo located in the municipality of Arratzua-Ubarrundia, in Álava province, Basque Country, Spain.
