= Jugo, Álava =

Hamlet in Álava, Spain

Jugo
- Concejo
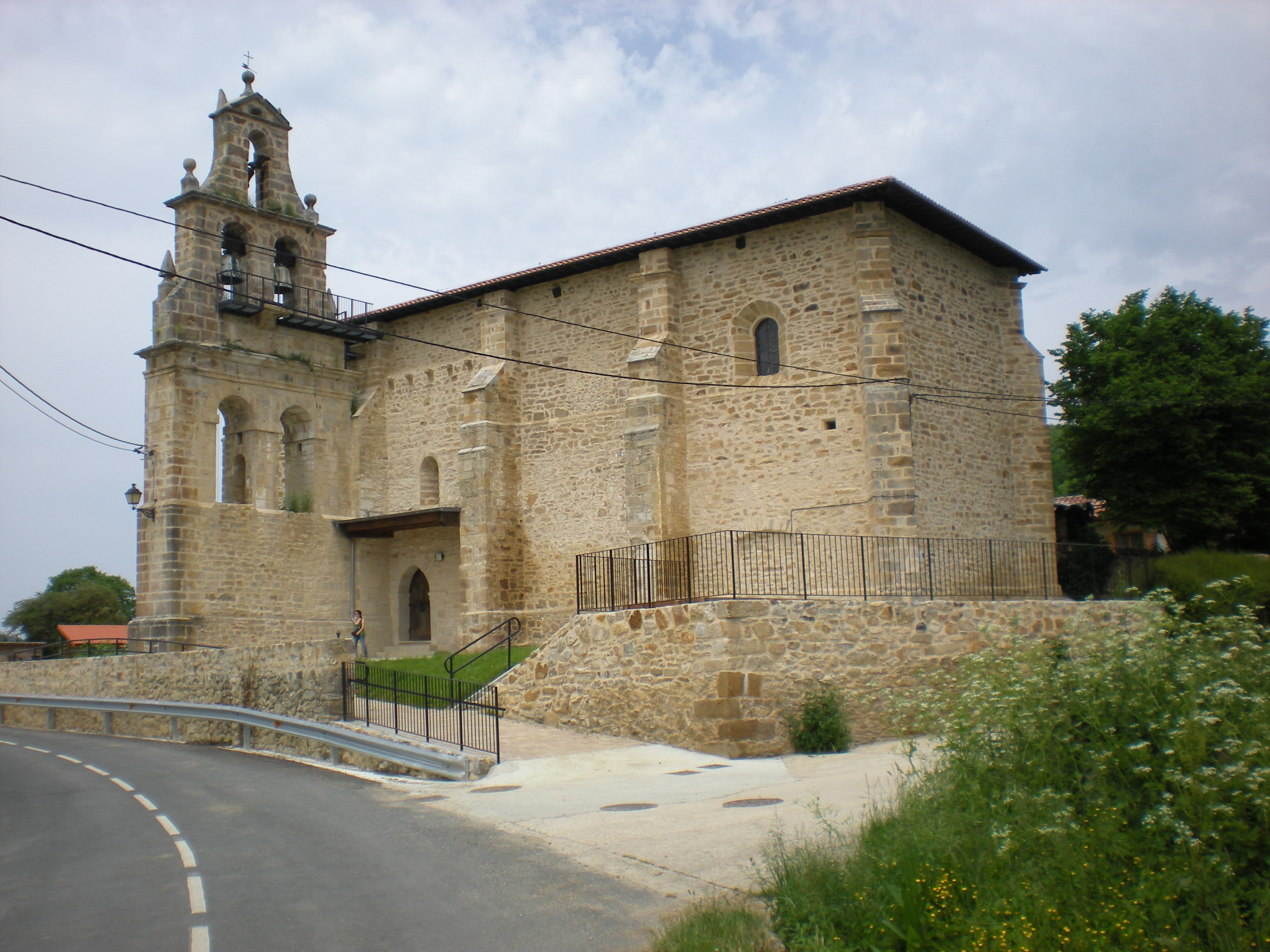
- Church of Jugo

- Coat of arms

- Location within Álava Location within the Basque Country Location within Spain
- Coordinates: 42°56′38″N 2°48′20″W
- Country: Spain
- Autonomous community: Basque Country
- Province: Álava
- Comarca: Gorbeialdea
- Municipality: Zuia

Area
  - Total: 3.93 km^{2} (1.52 sq mi)
- Elevation: 640 m (2,100 ft)

Population (2022)
  - Total: 43
  - Density: 11/km^{2} (28/sq mi)
- Postal code: 01139

Jugo is a hamlet and concejo in the municipality of Zuia, in Álava province, Basque Country, Spain. The Jugatxi chapel, the most important shrine in the municipality after the Sanctuary of Oro, is located on a hill close to Jugo.
