= Durana =

Village in Álava, Spain

- Concejo
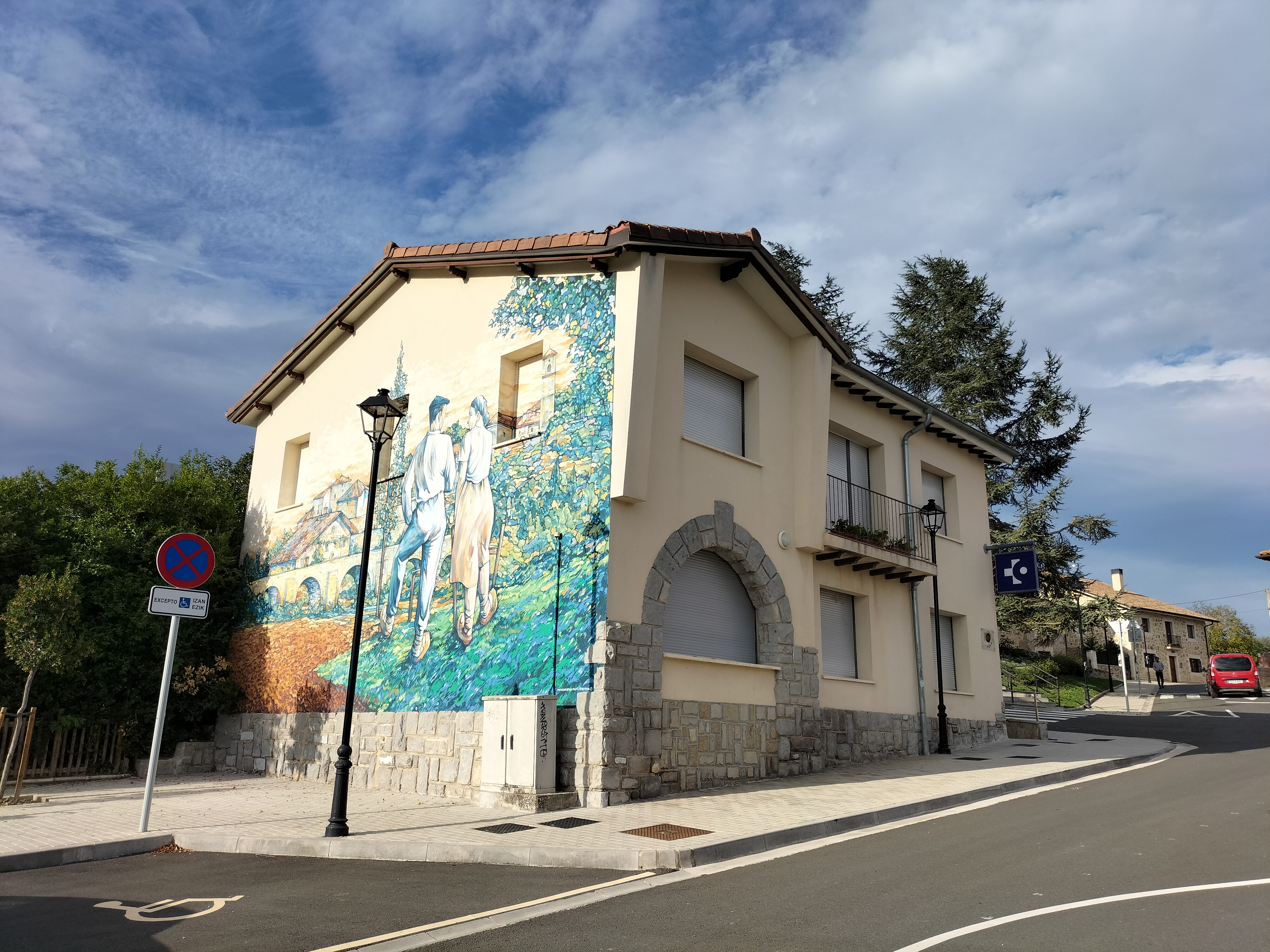
- House in Durana

- Location within Álava Location within the Basque Country Location within Spain
- Coordinates: 42°53′25″N 2°38′25″W
- Country: Spain
- Autonomous community: Basque Country
- Province: Álava
- Comarca: Gorbeialdea
- Municipality: Arratzua-Ubarrundia

Area
  - Total: 3.93 km^{2} (1.52 sq mi)
- Elevation: 541 m (1,775 ft)

Population (2021)
  - Total: 363
  - Density: 92.4/km^{2} (239/sq mi)
- Postal code: 01520

Durana (Spanish pronunciation: [duˈɾana], Basque: Dura [duɾa]) is a village and concejo located in the municipality of Arratzua-Ubarrundia, in Álava province, Basque Country, Spain. It is the capital of the municipality.
