= Zarate, Álava =

Hamlet in Álava, Spain

Zarate
- Concejo
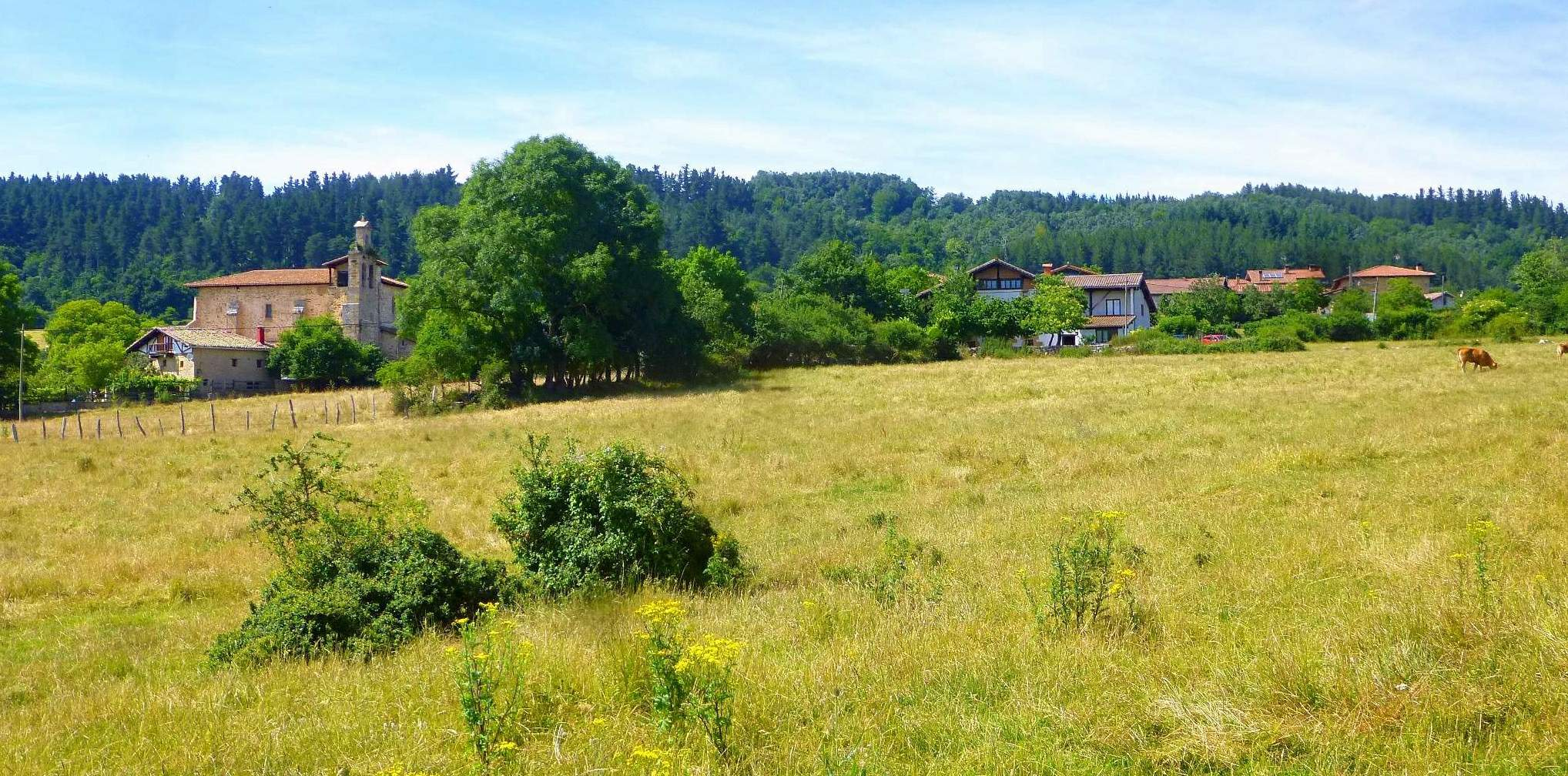
- View of Zarate

- Coat of arms

- Location within Álava Location within the Basque Country Location within Spain
- Coordinates: 42°57′50″N 2°47′10″W
- Country: Spain
- Autonomous community: Basque Country
- Province: Álava
- Comarca: Gorbeialdea
- Municipality: Zuia

Area
  - Total: 7.55 km^{2} (2.92 sq mi)
- Elevation: 730 m (2,400 ft)

Population (2021)
  - Total: 38
  - Density: 5.0/km^{2} (13/sq mi)
- Postal code: 01139

Zarate (Basque pronunciation: [s̻aɾate], Spanish: Zárate [ˈθaɾate]) is a hamlet and concejo located in the municipality of Zuia, in Álava province, Basque Country, Spain. It is located 20 km north-northwest of Vitoria-Gasteiz.
