= Ullíbarri-Gamboa =

Hamlet in Álava, Spain

- Concejo
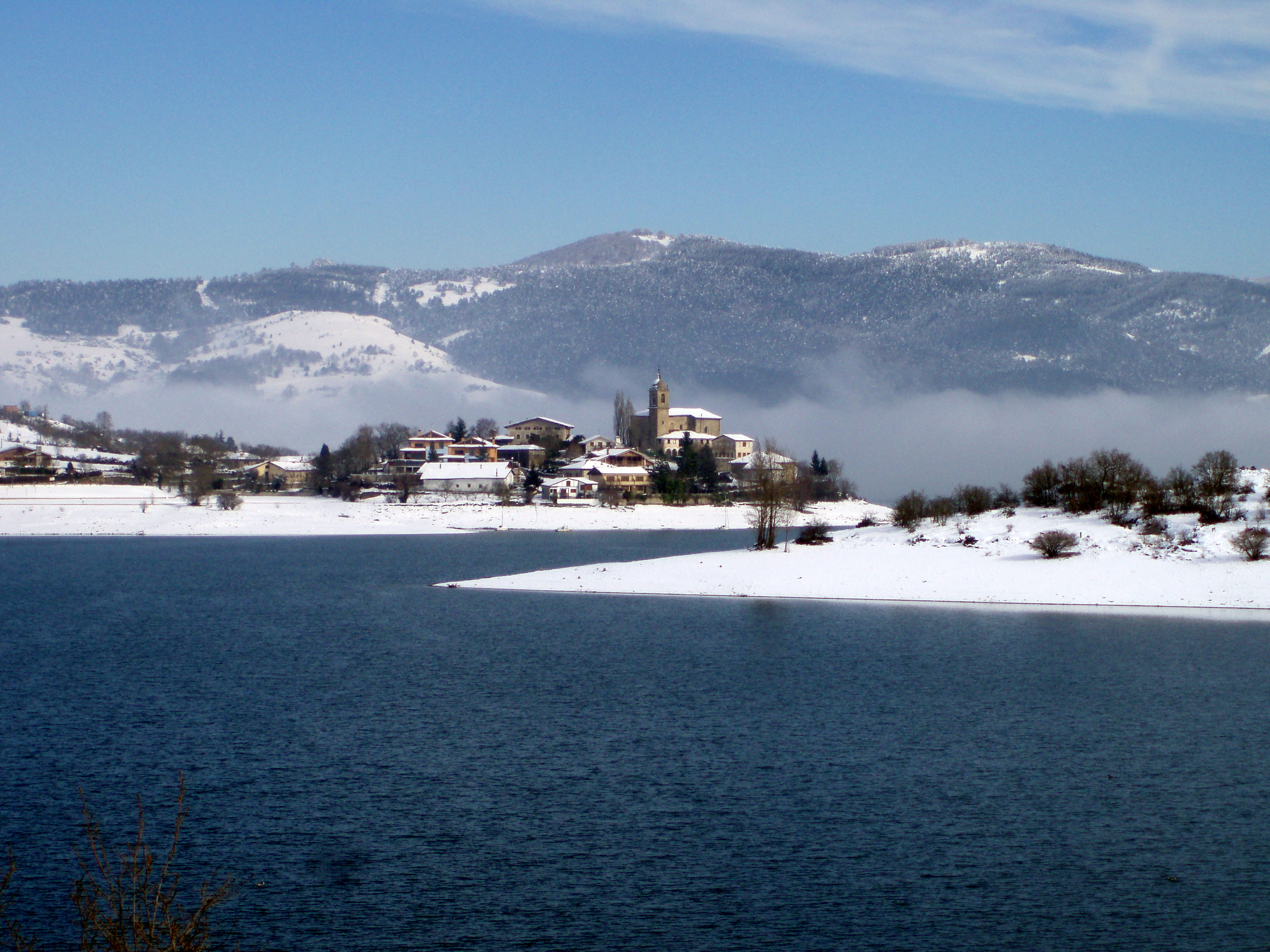
- Ullíbarri-Gamboa in the winter, view from the dam

- Location within Álava Location within the Basque Country Location within Spain
- Coordinates: 42°56′14″N 2°36′31″W
- Country: Spain
- Autonomous community: Basque Country
- Province: Álava
- Comarca: Gorbeialdea
- Municipality: Arratzua-Ubarrundia

Area
  - Total: 7.23 km^{2} (2.79 sq mi)
- Elevation: 559 m (1,834 ft)

Population (2021)
  - Total: 81
  - Density: 11/km^{2} (29/sq mi)
- Postal code: 01520

Ullíbarri-Gamboa (Spanish: [uˈʎiβari ɣamˈboa], Basque: Uribarri Ganboa Basque pronunciation: [uɾiβari ɣamboa]) is a hamlet and concejo located in the municipality of Arratzua-Ubarrundia, in Álava province, Basque Country, Spain.

The hamlet gives its name to the Ullíbarri-Gamboa Reservoir, the largest in the Basque Country, The construction of the dam, between 1947 and 1956, flooded part of the village as well as most of its farmland, forcing many residents to move to nearby Vitoria-Gasteiz.

== Etymology ==
The word Ullíbarri literally means "new town" in Basque, from uri (an archaic form of hiri, meaning "city") and barri (a dialectal form of berri, meaning "new"). Gamboa is the name of the valley which was flooded by the reservoir, as well as a former municipality in the area (Ullíbarri-Gamboa was not part of the municipality).

== Notable people ==
- Bartolomé de Letona, a 17th-century Franciscan friar who held important positions in Mexico and the Philippines. He wrote several works about religion and the Philippine Islands.
- Tomás Ruiz de Azúa (1659–1731), a military officer who developed his career in Chile, where he became ordinary mayor of Santiago de Chile and governor of Valparaíso.
- Francisco Ruiz de Azúa (1868-1929), a Benedictine monk and missionary who became Bishop of Eastern Tonkin in 1919.
