= Olaeta =

Hamlet in Álava, Spain

- Concejo
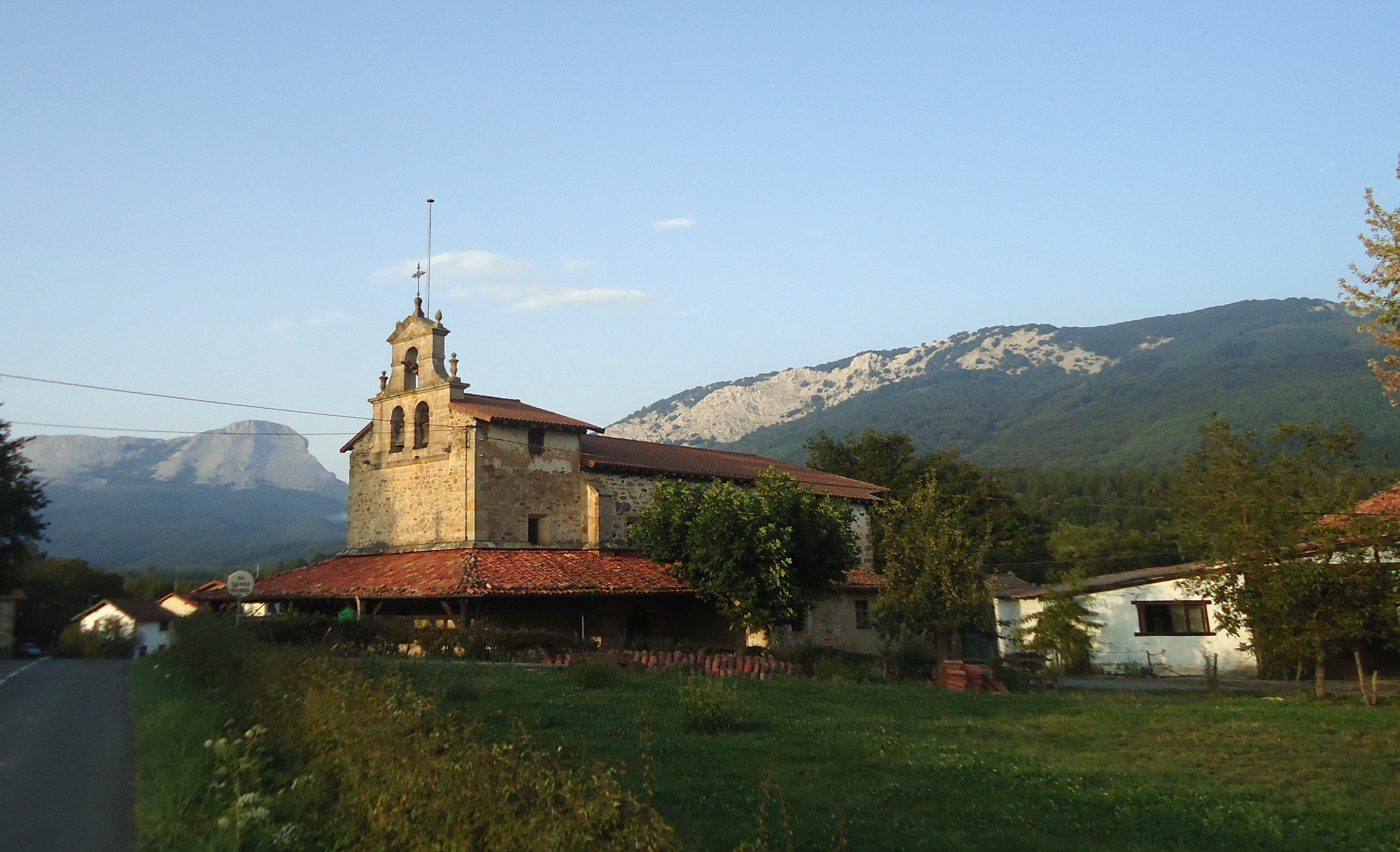
- View of Olaeta with Anboto in the background

- Location within Álava Location within the Basque Country Location within Spain
- Coordinates: 43°03′N 2°38′W
- Country: Spain
- Autonomous community: Basque Country
- Province: Álava
- Comarca: Gorbeialdea
- Municipality: Aramaio
- Elevation: 582 m (1,909 ft)

Population (2024)
  - Total: 109
- Postal code: 01165

Olaeta (Basque: Oleta) is a hamlet and concejo located in the municipality of Aramaio, in Álava province, Basque Country, Spain. El Limitado, a territory disputed between Álava and Biscay, is located next to Olaeta.
