= Ziorraga =

Hamlet in Álava, Spain

- Hamlet
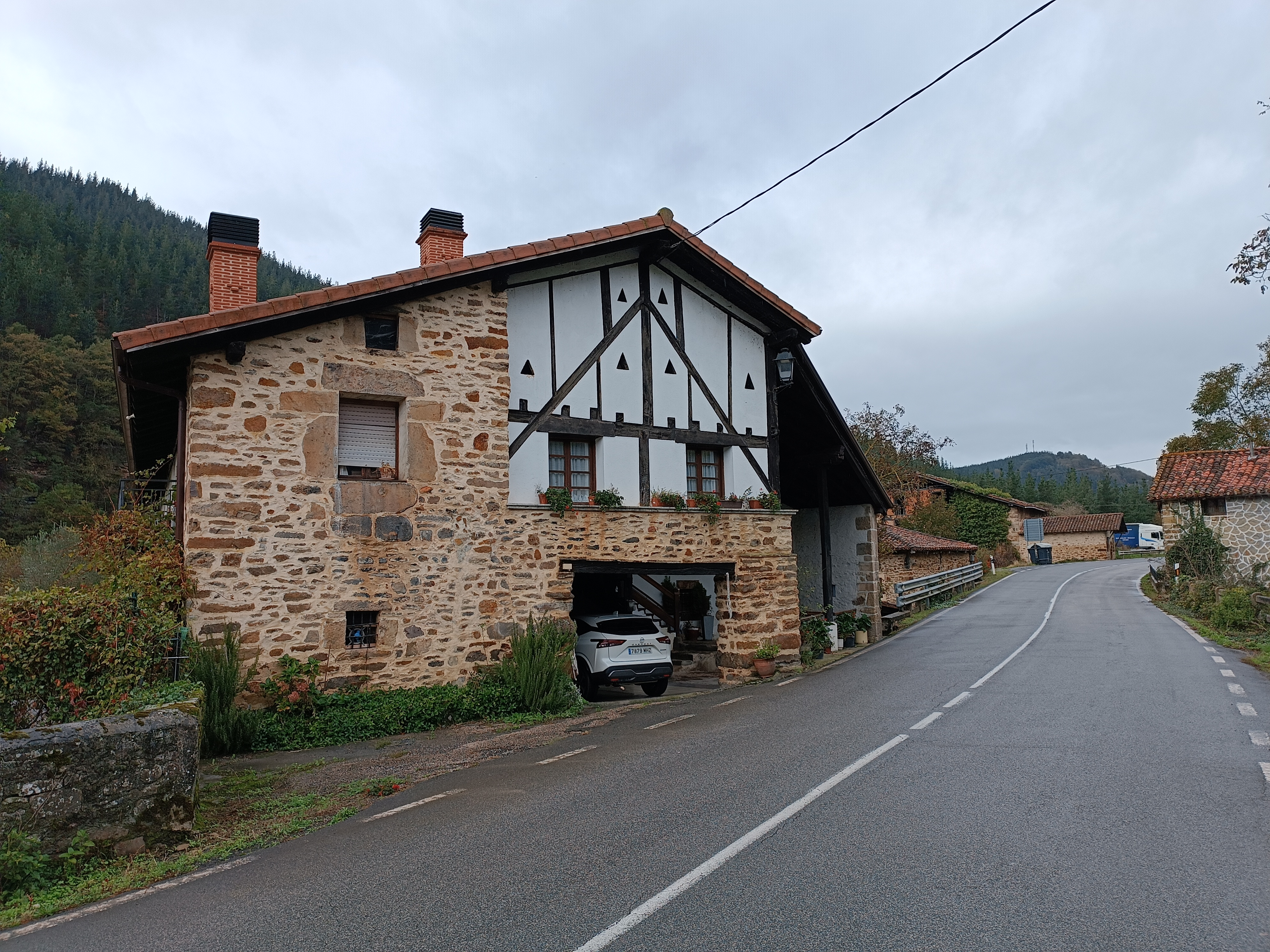
- Houses in Ziorraga

- Coat of arms

- Location within Álava Location within the Basque Country Location within Spain
- Coordinates: 43°01′55″N 2°54′53″W
- Country: Spain
- Autonomous community: Basque Country
- Province: Álava
- Comarca: Gorbeialdea
- Municipality: Zuia
- Elevation: 320 m (1,050 ft)

Population (2023)
  - Total: 11
- Postal code: 01139

Ziorraga (Spanish: Ciorraga) is a hamlet located in the municipality of Zuia, in Álava province, Basque Country, Spain.
