= Betolaza =

Hamlet in Álava, Spain

- Concejo
- Location within Álava Location within the Basque Country Location within Spain
- Coordinates: 42°56′19″N 2°39′59″W
- Country: Spain
- Autonomous community: Basque Country
- Province: Álava
- Comarca: Gorbeialdea
- Municipality: Arratzua-Ubarrundia

Area
  - Total: 4.29 km^{2} (1.66 sq mi)
- Elevation: 546 m (1,791 ft)

Population (2023)
  - Total: 27
  - Density: 6.3/km^{2} (16/sq mi)
- Postal code: 01510

Betolaza (Basque: Betolatza) is a hamlet and concejo in the municipality of Arratzua-Ubarrundia, in Álava province, Basque Country, Spain.
