= Zurbano =

Village in Álava, Spain

Zurbano/Zurbao
- Concejo
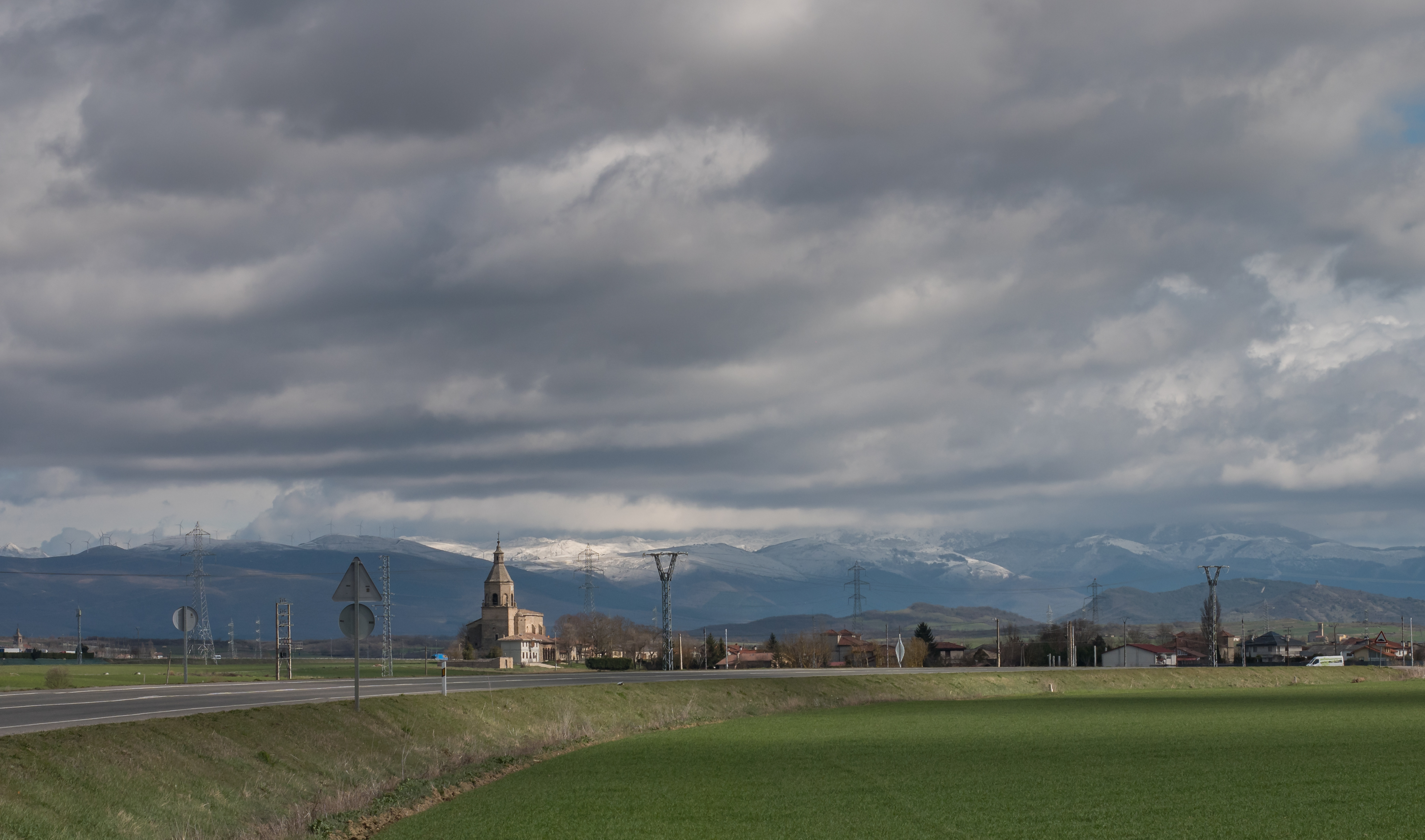
- View of Zurbano

- Location within Álava Location within the Basque Country Location within Spain
- Coordinates: 42°52′N 2°37′W
- Country: Spain
- Autonomous community: Basque Country
- Province: Álava
- Comarca: Gorbeialdea
- Municipality: Arratzua-Ubarrundia

Area
  - Total: 4.77 km^{2} (1.84 sq mi)

Population (2023)
  - Total: 277
  - Density: 58.1/km^{2} (150/sq mi)
- Postal code: 01520

Zurbano (Spanish pronunciation: [θuɾˈβano]) or Zurbao (Basque pronunciation: [s̻urβao]) is a village and concejo in the municipality of Arratzua-Ubarrundia, Álava, Basque Country, Spain. It lies on the northeastern rural outskirts of Vitoria-Gasteiz.

== Landmarks ==
Zurbano is notable for having numerous palaces dating from the seventeenth and eighteenth centuries. Of them, the Zurbano Palace is listed as a Bien de Interés Cultural. The other palaces are the Ortiz de Zárate Palace, the Otazu Palace and the Otalora-Guevara Palace, which was restored in 2023. The parish church, dedicated to Saint Stephen, dates from the fifteenth century.
