= Arzubiaga =

Hamlet in Álava, Spain

- Concejo
- Location within Álava Location within the Basque Country Location within Spain
- Coordinates: 42°53′N 2°37′W
- Country: Spain
- Autonomous community: Basque Country
- Province: Álava
- Comarca: Gorbeialdea
- Municipality: Arratzua-Ubarrundia

Area
  - Total: 2.58 km^{2} (1.00 sq mi)
- Elevation: 549 m (1,801 ft)

Population (2021)
  - Total: 20
  - Density: 7.8/km^{2} (20/sq mi)
- Postal code: 01520

Arzubiaga (Basque pronunciation: [ars̻uβi.aɣa], Spanish pronunciation: [aɾ.θuˈβjaɣa]) is a hamlet and concejo located in the municipality of Arratzua-Ubarrundia, in Álava province, Basque Country, Spain.
