= Ziriano =

Hamlet in Álava, Spain

- Concejo
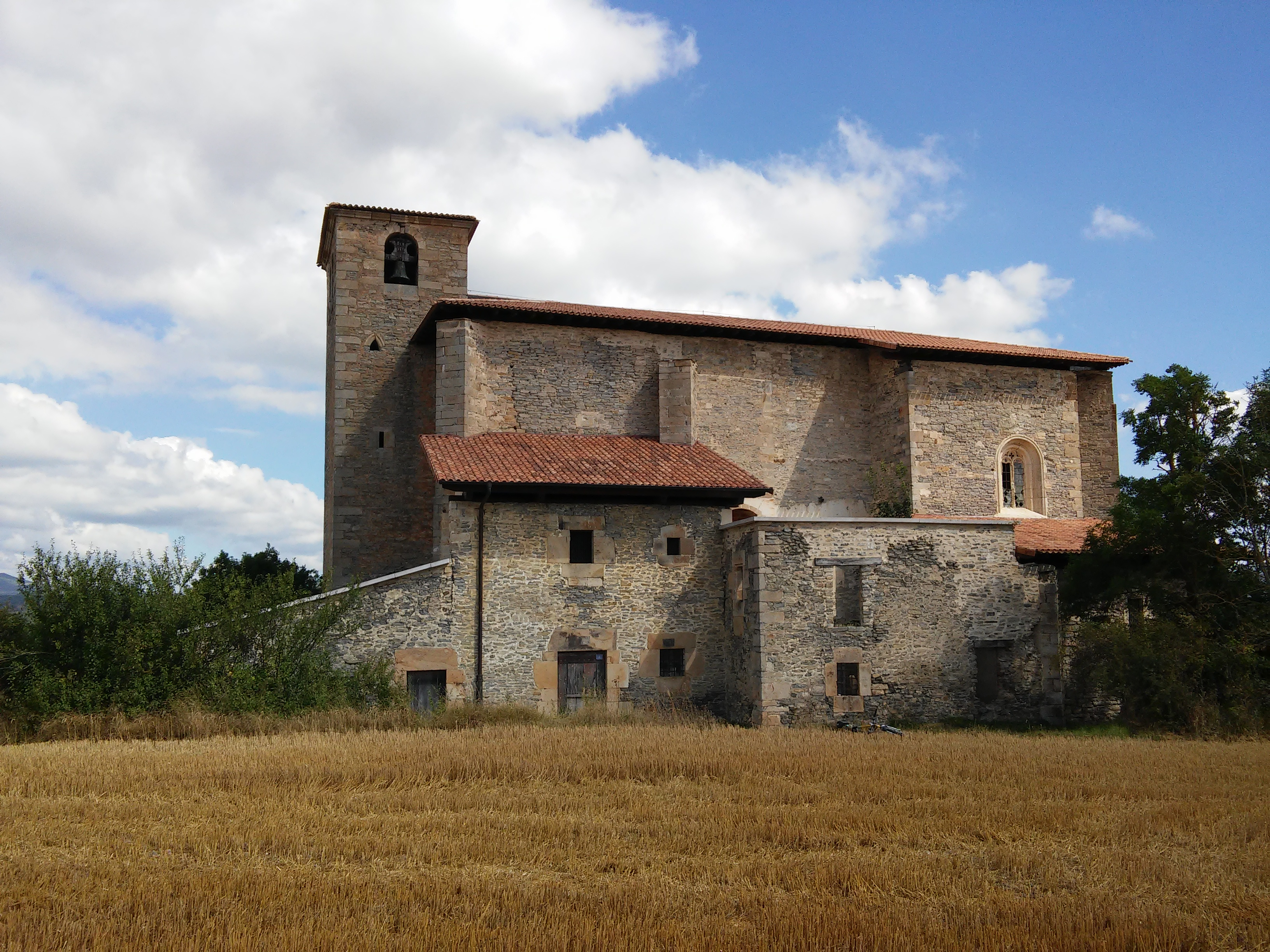
- Church of San Juan Evangelista

- Location within Álava Location within the Basque Country Location within Spain
- Coordinates: 42°55′46″N 2°40′27″W
- Country: Spain
- Autonomous community: Basque Country
- Province: Álava
- Comarca: Gorbeialdea
- Municipality: Arratzua-Ubarrundia

Area
  - Total: 3.24 km^{2} (1.25 sq mi)
- Elevation: 575 m (1,886 ft)

Population (2023)
  - Total: 8
  - Density: 2.5/km^{2} (6.4/sq mi)
- Postal code: 01510

Ziriano (Spanish: Ciriano, alternatively in Basque: Zirao) is a hamlet and concejo in the municipality of Arratzua-Ubarrundia, Álava, Basque Country, Spain.
