= Orisol =

Mountain in Álava, Spain

Oriol
- Orisol, Orixol
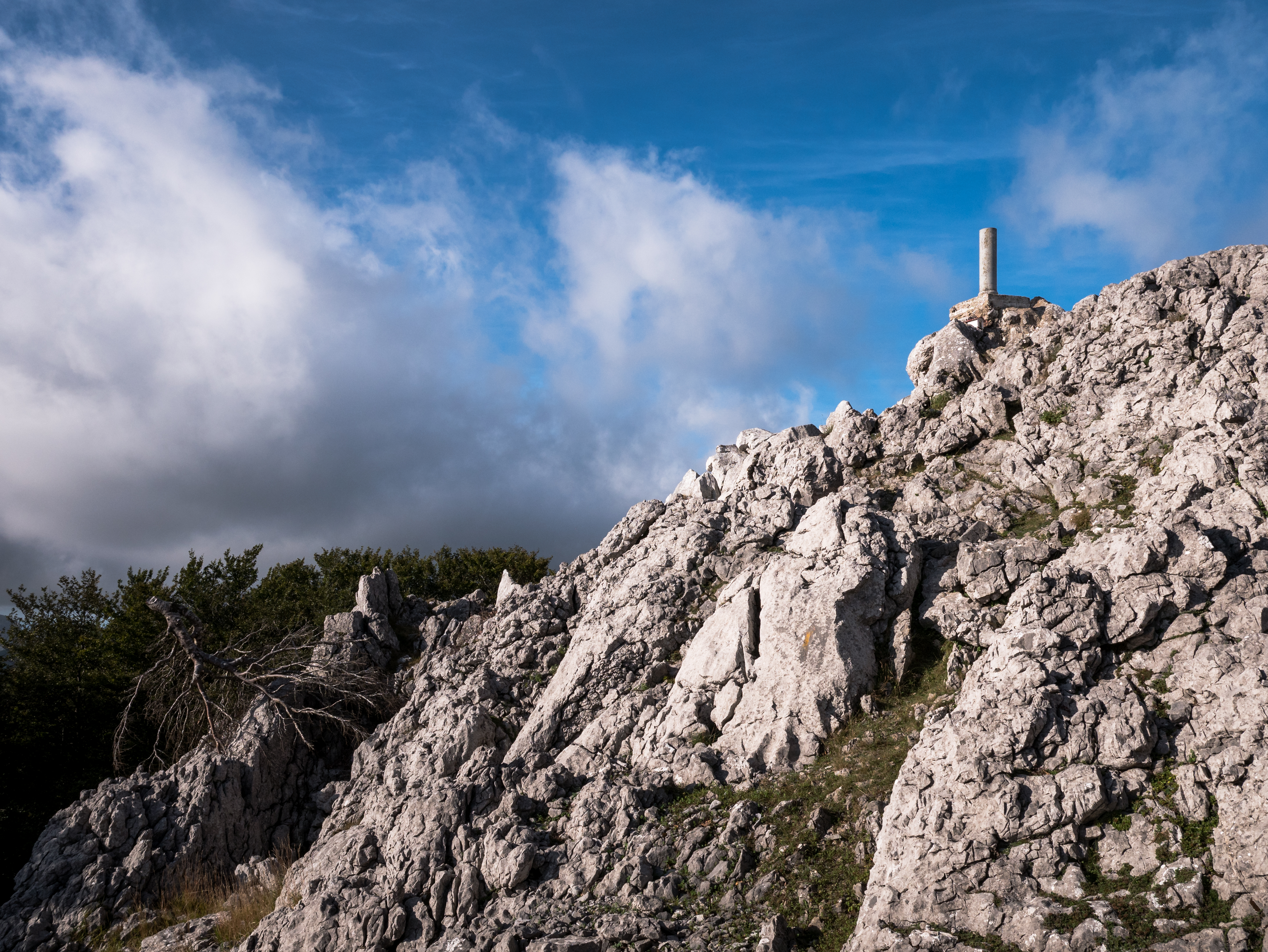
- View of the summit

Highest point
- Elevation: 1,132 m (3,714 ft)
- Prominence: 262 m (860 ft)
- Coordinates: 43°3′28″N 2°35′59″W

Geography
- Location: Álava, Basque Country, Spain
- Parent range: Anboto range

Climbing
- Easiest route: Hike

Oriol (also known as Orisol or Orixol) is a mountain located in the Basque Mountains of the Spanish province of Álava. It overlooks the valley of Aramaio. The most popular trail starts at the Kurtzeta pass.
