= Aramaio =

Town and municipality in Basque Country, Spain

- Municipality
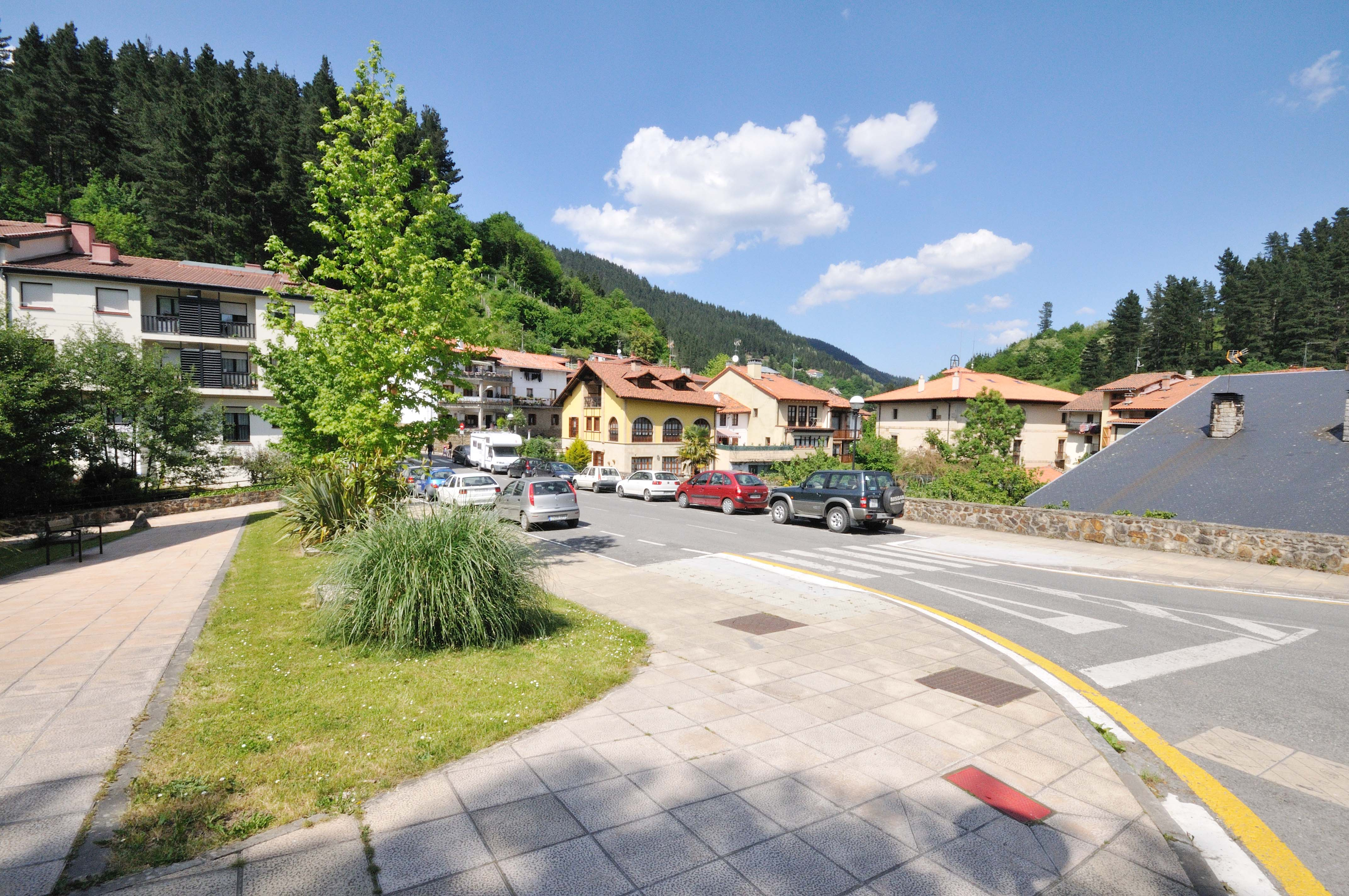

- Coat of arms

- Location of Aramaio within the Basque Country Location of Aramaio within Spain
- Coordinates: 43°2′7″N 2°35′7″W
- Country: Spain
- Autonomous Community: Basque Country
- Province: Álava
- Comarca: Gorbeialdea

Government
  - Mayor: Martin Arriolabengoa Unzueta

Area
  - Total: 73.27 km^{2} (28.29 sq mi)
- Elevation (AMSL): 333 m (1,093 ft)

Population (2025-01-01)
  - Total: 1,354
  - Density: 18.48/km^{2} (47.86/sq mi)
- Time zone: UTC+1 (CET)
  - Summer (DST): UTC+2 (CEST (GMT +2))
- Postal code: 01169

Aramaio (Spanish: Aramayona) is a town and municipality located in the province of Álava, in the Basque Country, northern Spain.

== Elizate ==
- Arexola, elizate
- Azkoaga, elizate
- Barajuen, elizate
- Etxaguen, elizate
- Gantzaga, elizate
- Ibarra, capital and main population of the municipality including the following hamlets: Arraga, Eguzkierripa, Errotabarri et Salgo
- Oleta, elizate and concejo
- Untzilla, elizate
- Uribarri, elizate

== Geography ==
=== Mountains ===
- Orisol
