= Lukiano =

Hamlet in Álava, Spain

- Concejo
- Coat of arms

- Location within Álava Location within the Basque Country Location within Spain
- Coordinates: 42°55′53″N 2°51′25″W
- Country: Spain
- Autonomous community: Basque Country
- Province: Álava
- Comarca: Gorbeialdea
- Municipality: Zuia

Area
  - Total: 3.74 km^{2} (1.44 sq mi)
- Elevation: 620 m (2,030 ft)

Population (2023)
  - Total: 41
  - Density: 11/km^{2} (28/sq mi)
- Postal code: 01139

Lukiano (Spanish: Luquiano) is a hamlet and concejo in the municipality of Zuia, in Álava province, Basque Country, Spain.
