= Mendibil, Álava =

Hamlet in Álava, Spain

Mendibil
- Concejo
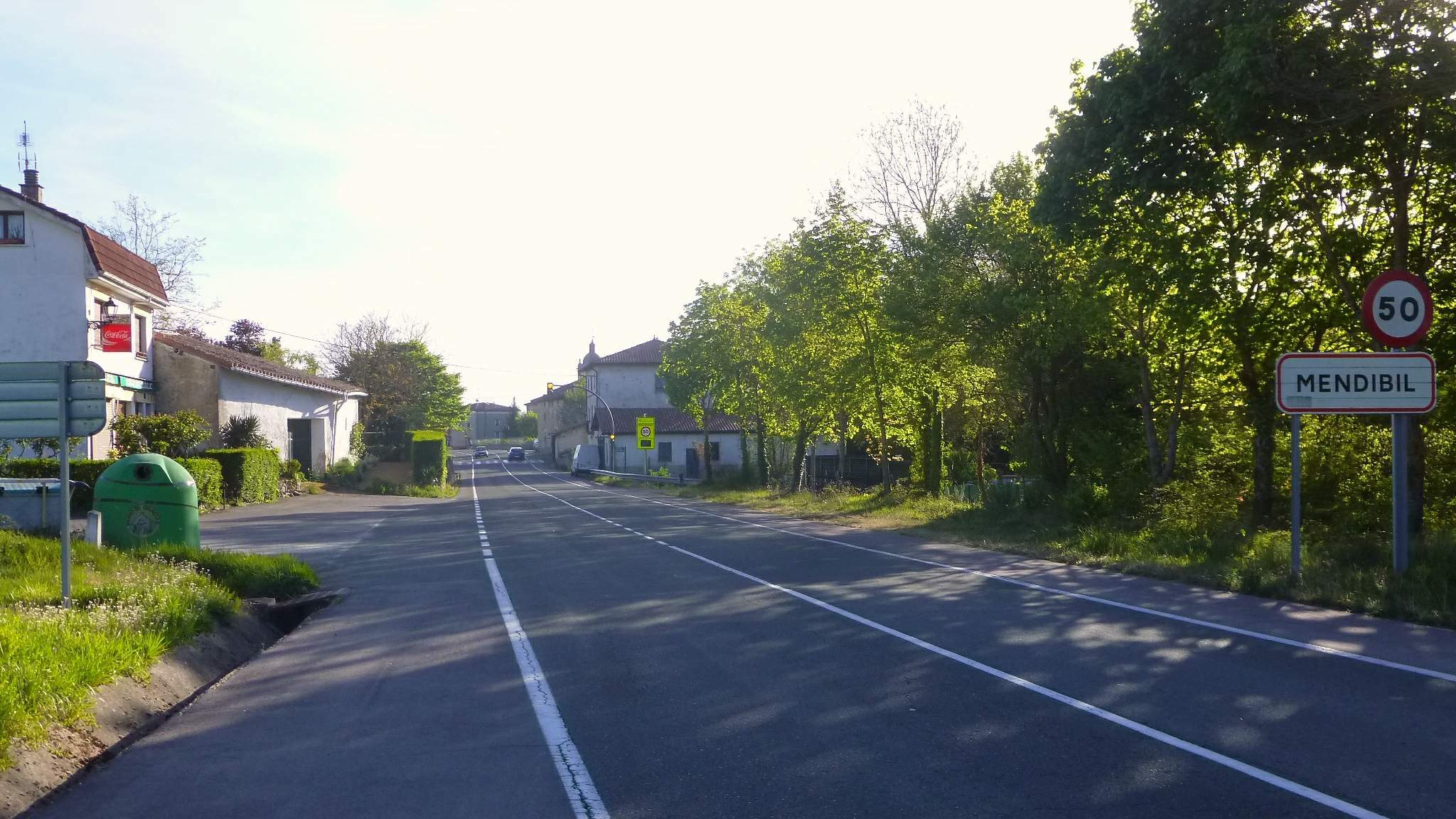

- Coat of arms

- Location within Álava Location within the Basque Country Location within Spain
- Coordinates: 42°54′22″N 2°37′39″W
- Country: Spain
- Autonomous community: Basque Country
- Province: Álava
- Comarca: Gorbeialdea
- Municipality: Arratzua-Ubarrundia

Area
  - Total: 3.18 km^{2} (1.23 sq mi)
- Elevation: 518 m (1,699 ft)

Population (2021)
  - Total: 40
  - Density: 13/km^{2} (33/sq mi)
- Postal code: 01520

Mendibil (Basque pronunciation: [mendiβil], Spanish: Mendívil [menˈdiβil]) is a hamlet and concejo located in the municipality of Arratzua-Ubarrundia, in Álava province, Basque Country, Spain.
