= Zuia =

Zuia Zuya
- Municipality
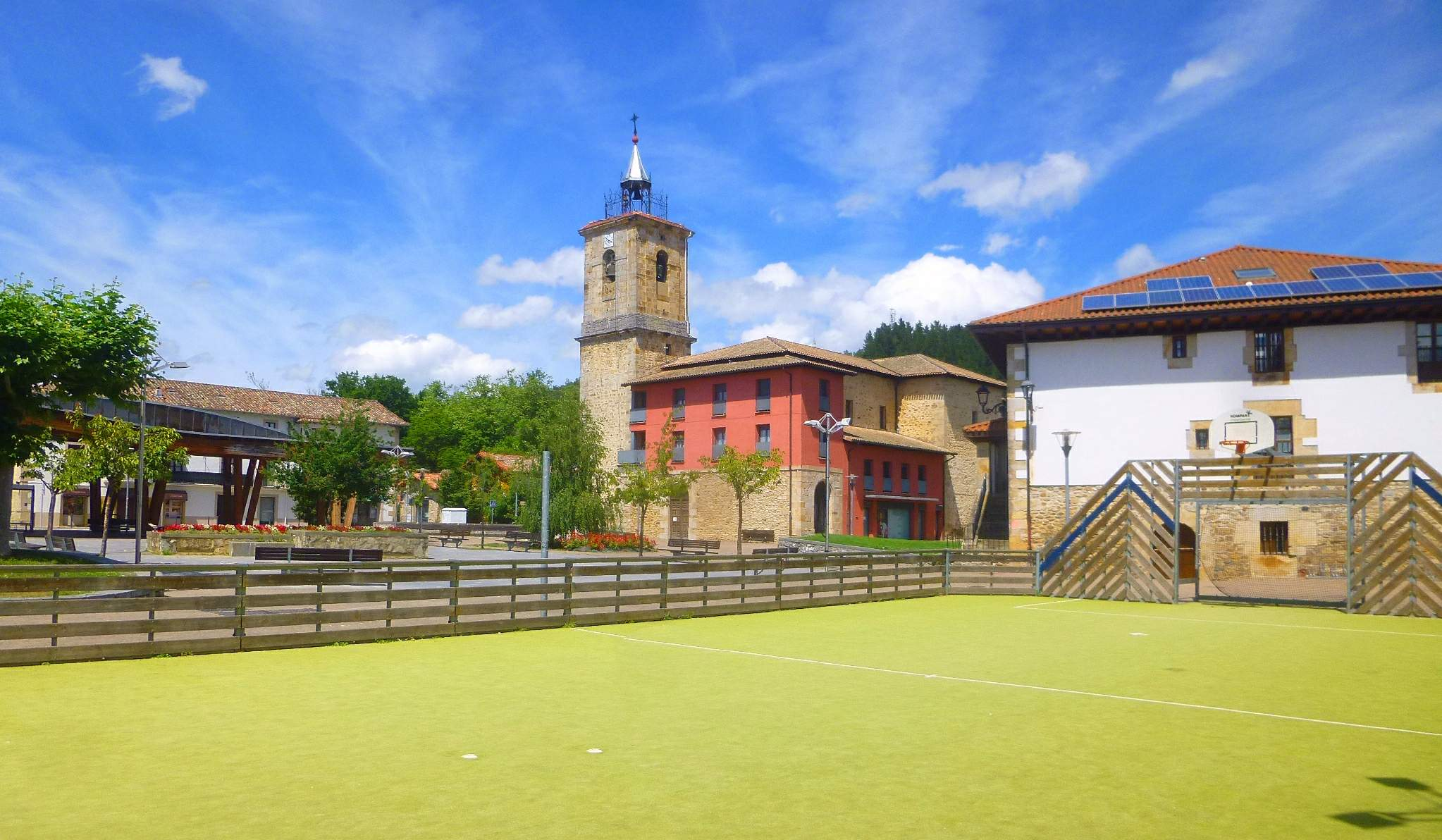
- Church of San Miguel in Murgia, Zuia

- Flag Coat of arms

- Location within Álava Location within the Basque Country Location within Spain
- Coordinates: 42°58.9′N 2°50.64′W
- Country: Spain
- Autonomous community: Basque Country
- Province: Araba/Álava
- Eskualdea / Comarca: Gorbeialdea

Government
  - Mayor: Unai Gutierrez Urquiza

Area
  - Total: 122.49 km^{2} (47.29 sq mi)
- Elevation: 617 m (2,024 ft)

Population (2025-01-01)
  - Total: 2,350
  - Density: 19.2/km^{2} (49.7/sq mi)
- (INE)
- Demonym: Zuiar
- Time zone: UTC+1 (CET)
  - Summer (DST): UTC+2 (CEST)
- Postal code: 01430

Zuia (Spanish: Zuya) is a town and municipality located in the province of Álava, in the Basque Country, northern Spain.

== History ==
The first mention of the Zuia Valley is in the document Reja de San Millán from the year 1025 (though some authors argue that it is posterior, probably twelfth century), a document conserved in the Monastery of San Millán (La Rioja). The document states that every ten neighbors must deliver a grating iron to a religious institution; according to the document, nine bars correspond to Zuia, 13 to Zigoitia, 12 to Kuartango, etc. In 1752, after repeated attempts, the king approved the establishment of a highway through the valley of Zuia to facilitate communication between Vitoria and Bilbao. Work was supposed to be completed by the year 1798. In 1763, they voted to enlarge the town hall, under Mayor Francisco Vea Murgia. In 1767 the city council house of Zuia was finished. However, in 1795, after 6 years of poor harvests and a draining war with France, the Valley remained mired in abject poverty, so they sold half of the town hall for 4300 ducats to Don Domingo Ortiz de Zarate, the patron of Luquiano, who lived in Murgia.

== Geography ==
Geographically, the municipio of Zuia borders the province of Biscay (Orozko and Zeanuri) and Álava municipalities: Urkabustaiz, Amurrio, Zigoitia, Kuartango and Vitoria-Gasteiz. Within its limits is located a large portion of the Gorbea massif (73.5 km^{2} (28.4 sq mi)), including its most important summits: Gorbea (1,482 m), Nafakorta (1.017 m) Burbona (935 m) and Berretín (1.226 m). The sources of several rivers are located here, including the Baias, the Ugalde, and the Larreakorta, which as they flow from North to South have carved steep watersheds into the valley of Zuia, around river Baias. Although part of the original vegetation of Gorbeia has been cleared (nowadays occupied by heath and pine), beech woods are still found in Berretín (Larreakorta), Arlobi, and Ilunbe; an extensive Pyrenean in the ravine of the river Ugalde (Aldamiz, Arazo and Southeast of Berretín); and a strip of alder groves on the banks of the Baias. But, without a doubt, the best preserved enclave is the beech forest of Altube, where the part of Zuia, has been developed around the canyons that descend from Burbona: the Bortal/Rekandi and Katxandiano. In the area of Zuia Valley, oaks remain next to the Baias (in Bitoriano, Ametzaga Lukiano and Gillerna in Basubitxi and San Fausto), distributed like islets between large areas of pasture that occupy the entire Valley of Zuia. Peñas de Oro/Atxabal (896 m) and Ganalto (Badaia saw, 900 m.), close the Zuia Valley, sheltering patches of beech and oak on its slopes. These places offer views over all Oro, a place of great botanical, geological (calcareous Islet in the diapiric area of Murgia) and artistic (Sanctuary of Oro) interest.

== Economy ==
Zuia was historically a farming and ranching municipio. The first industries appeared here in the twentieth century; today it is basically becoming a residential area. As in the rest of the region, livestock and forestry were once the primary economical activities of the area. Though agriculture is no longer a major component of the local economy, there are still important sheep and cattle farms here, in some of which (Sarria) Idiazabal cheese is made. The beekeeping sector is growing in importance, with the production of honey and derivatives, which are promoted from the Honey museum in Murgia. The industrial sector is located in the industrial estates of Murgia and Islarra (next to the motorway A-68), with an area of over 100,000 m2 of industrial land. Services are undoubtedly the most important sector of Zuia's economy. The growth of tourism and nature-related sport activities have driven this industry in a municipality with a long tourism tradition.

Murgia has become a center of services whose sphere of influence goes far beyond municipal boundaries. This way, it hosts numerous shops, bars, restaurants, hotels, sports center, technical services, tourist office, etc. Other villages of the Valley also host such services: farmhouses and cottages (Lukiano, Markina and Sarria), bars and restaurants (Bitoriano and Sarria), Zuia Golf Club in Altube, Service Areas in the motorway (restaurant and hotel in Altube), etc.

== Villages ==
The villages in the municipality are:

- Ametzaga
- Aperregi
- Aretxaga
- Bitoriano
- Domaikia
- Gilierna-Guillerna
- Jugo (Itzugo)
- Lukiano
- Markina
- Murgia, the capital
- Sarria
- Zarate-Zárate
- Ziorraga

== See also ==
- Sanctuary of Our Lady of Oro
