= Sarria, Álava =

Village in Álava, Spain

Sarria
- Concejo
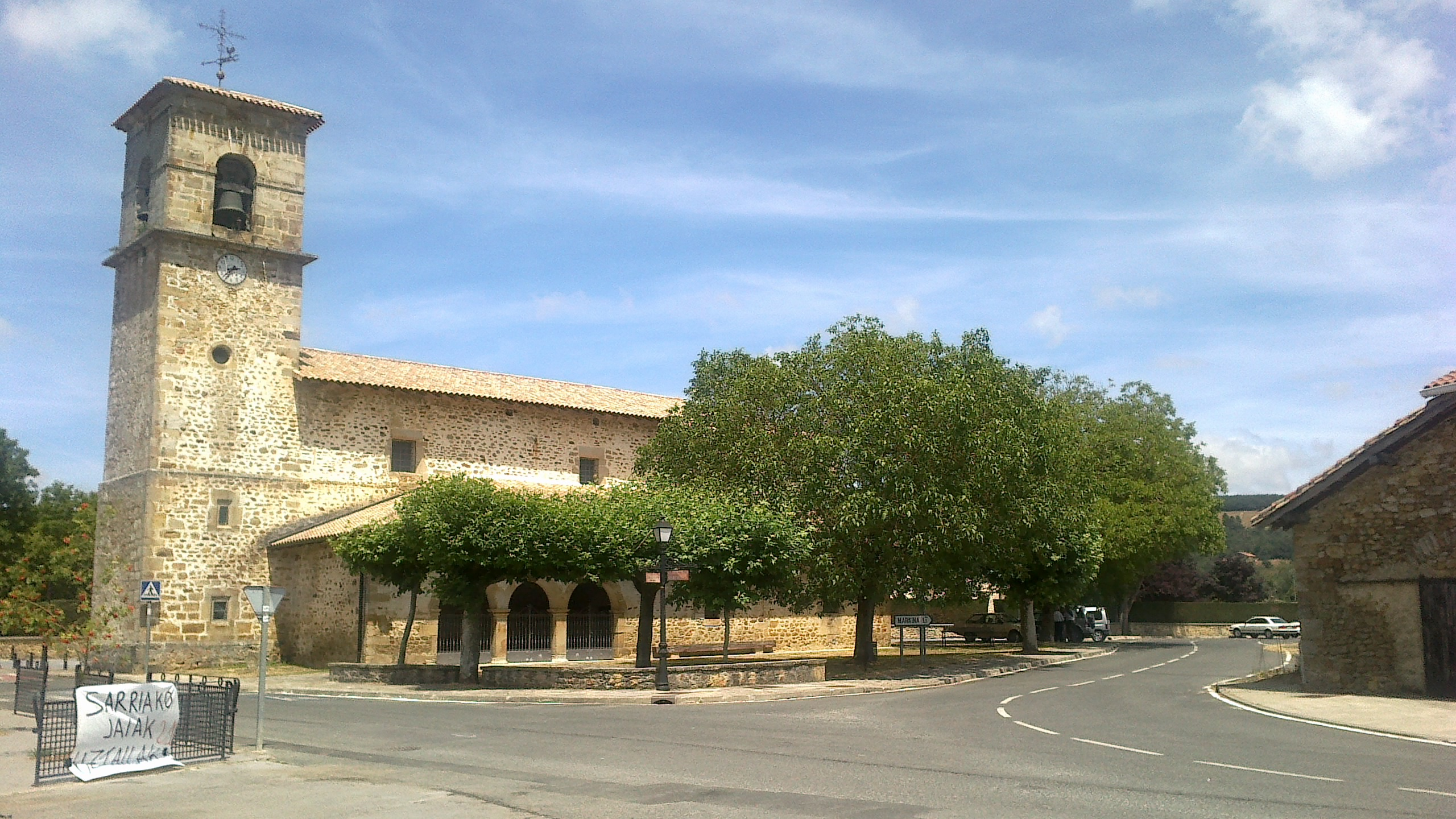
- The church of Sarria

- Coat of arms

- Location within Álava Location within the Basque Country Location within Spain
- Coordinates: 42°57′59″N 2°49′26″W
- Country: Spain
- Autonomous community: Basque Country
- Province: Álava
- Comarca: Gorbeialdea
- Municipality: Zuia

Area
  - Total: 2.75 km^{2} (1.06 sq mi)
- Elevation: 627 m (2,057 ft)

Population (2023)
  - Total: 271
  - Density: 98.5/km^{2} (255/sq mi)
- Postal code: 01139

Sarria (Spanish: Sarría) is a village and concejo in the municipality of Zuia, in Álava province, Basque Country, Spain.
