= Landa, Álava =

Hamlet in Álava, Spain

Landa
- Concejo
- Location within Álava Location within the Basque Country Location within Spain
- Coordinates: 42°57′37″N 2°35′25″W
- Country: Spain
- Autonomous community: Basque Country
- Province: Álava
- Comarca: Gorbeialdea
- Municipality: Arratzua-Ubarrundia

Area
  - Total: 7.62 km^{2} (2.94 sq mi)
- Elevation: 555 m (1,821 ft)

Population (2023)
  - Total: 29
  - Density: 3.8/km^{2} (9.9/sq mi)
- Postal code: 01520

Landa is a hamlet and concejo in the municipality of Arratzua-Ubarrundia, in Álava province, Basque Country, Spain.
