= Markina, Álava =

Hamlet in Álava, Spain

Markina
- Concejo
- Coat of arms

- Location within Álava Location within the Basque Country Location within Spain
- Coordinates: 42°58′34″N 2°49′05″W
- Country: Spain
- Autonomous community: Basque Country
- Province: Álava
- Comarca: Gorbeialdea
- Municipality: Zuia

Area
  - Total: 4.80 km^{2} (1.85 sq mi)
- Elevation: 650 m (2,130 ft)

Population (2023)
  - Total: 76
  - Density: 16/km^{2} (41/sq mi)
- Postal code: 01139

Markina (Spanish: Marquina) is a hamlet and concejo in the municipality of Zuia, in Álava province, Basque Country, Spain.
