= Arratzua-Ubarrundia =

Municipality in Spain

- Municipality
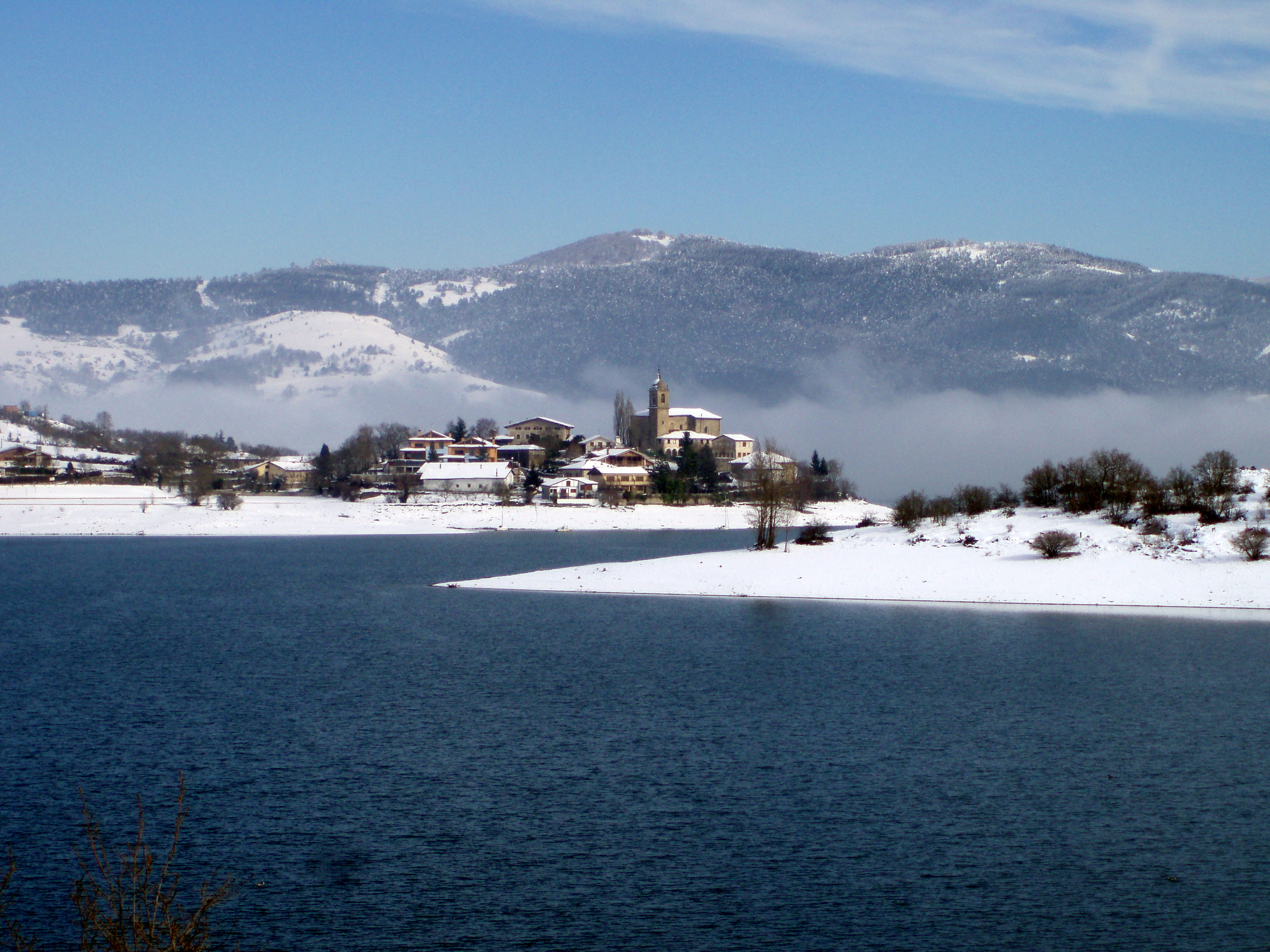
- View of Ullíbarri-Gamboa

- Coat of arms

- Location of Arratzua-Ubarrundia within the Basque Country
- Coordinates: 42°53′25″N 2°38′21″W
- Country: Spain
- Autonomous community: Basque Country
- Province: Álava
- Comarca: Gorbeialdea

Government
  - Mayor: Blanca Antépara Uribe (EAJ/PNV)

Area
  - Total: 57.41 km^{2} (22.17 sq mi)
- Elevation: 541 m (1,775 ft)

Population (2025-01-01)
  - Total: 1,056
  - Density: 18.39/km^{2} (47.64/sq mi)
- Time zone: UTC+1 (CET)
  - Summer (DST): UTC+2 (CEST)
- Postal code: 01510, 01520
- Official language(s): Basque; Spanish
- Website: Official website

Arratzua-Ubarrundia (Basque pronunciation: [arats̻u.a uβarundi.a], Spanish: Arrazua-Ubarrundia [aˈraθwawβaˈrundja]) is a municipality located in the province of Álava, in the Basque Country, northern Spain. Its capital is the village of Durana.

== Geography ==
=== Administrative subdivisions ===
Arratzua-Ubarrundia is divided into 11 villages, of which 10 are organized as concejos.

Official name	Basque name	Spanish name	Population (2021)	Area (km^{2})	Notes
Arroiabe	Arroiabe	Arróyabe	91	4.70	Concejo
Arzubiaga	Arzubiaga	Arzubiaga	20	2.58	Concejo
Betolaza	Betolatza	Betolaza	27	4.28	Concejo
Durana	Dura	Durana	363	3.92	Concejo, capital of the municipality
Landa	Landa	Landa	39	7.60	Concejo
Luko	Luku	Luco	60	4.57	Concejo
Mendibil	Mendibil	Mendívil	40	3.18	Concejo
Nanclares de Gamboa/Langara Ganboa	Nanclares de Gamboa	Langara Ganboa	20	–	
Ullíbarri-Gamboa	Ullíbarri-Gamboa	Uribarri Ganboa	81	7.19	Concejo
Ziriano	Zirao	Ciriano	7	3.23	Concejo
Zurbano/Zurbao	Zurbao	Zurbano	269	4.75	Concejo
