= Ametzaga Zuia =

Village in Álava, Spain

- Concejo
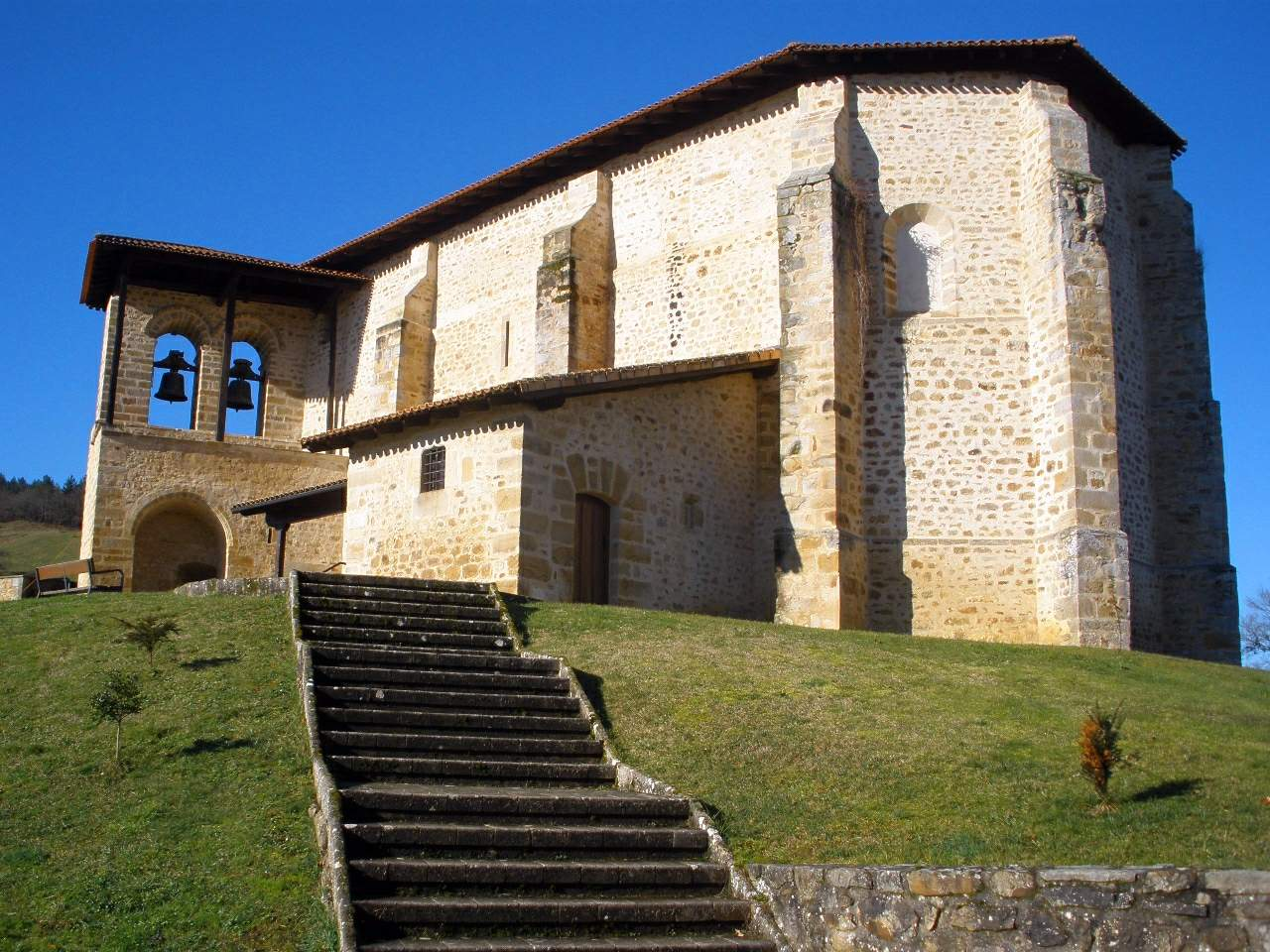
- The church of Ametzaga Zuia

- Coat of arms

- Location within Álava Location within the Basque Country Location within Spain
- Coordinates: 42°57′35″N 2°50′29″W
- Country: Spain
- Autonomous community: Basque Country
- Province: Álava
- Comarca: Gorbeialdea
- Municipality: Zuia

Area
  - Total: 3.05 km^{2} (1.18 sq mi)
- Elevation: 616 m (2,021 ft)

Population (2023)
  - Total: 289
  - Density: 94.8/km^{2} (245/sq mi)
- Postal code: 01139

Ametzaga Zuia (Spanish: Amézaga de Zuya, alternatively in Basque: Ametzaga) is a village and concejo in the municipality of Zuia, in Álava province, Basque Country, Spain.
