= Gillerna =

Hamlet in Álava, Spain

- Concejo
- Coat of arms

- Location within Álava Location within the Basque Country Location within Spain
- Coordinates: 42°57′N 2°51′W
- Country: Spain
- Autonomous community: Basque Country
- Province: Álava
- Comarca: Gorbeialdea
- Municipality: Zuia

Area
  - Total: 2.87 km^{2} (1.11 sq mi)
- Elevation: 659 m (2,162 ft)

Population (2023)
  - Total: 56
  - Density: 20/km^{2} (51/sq mi)
- Postal code: 01139

Gillerna (Spanish: Guillerna) is a hamlet and concejo in the municipality of Zuia, in Álava province, Basque Country, Spain.
