= Domaikia =

Hamlet in Álava, Spain

- Concejo
- Coat of arms

- Location within Álava Location within the Basque Country Location within Spain
- Coordinates: 42°55′39″N 2°48′22″W
- Country: Spain
- Autonomous community: Basque Country
- Province: Álava
- Comarca: Gorbeialdea
- Municipality: Zuia

Area
  - Total: 5.77 km^{2} (2.23 sq mi)
- Elevation: 652 m (2,139 ft)

Population (2022)
  - Total: 69
  - Density: 12/km^{2} (31/sq mi)
- Postal code: 01139

Domaikia (Spanish: Domaiquia) is a hamlet and concejo in the municipality of Zuia, in Álava province, Basque Country, Spain.
