= Bitoriano =

Hamlet in Álava, Spain

- Concejo
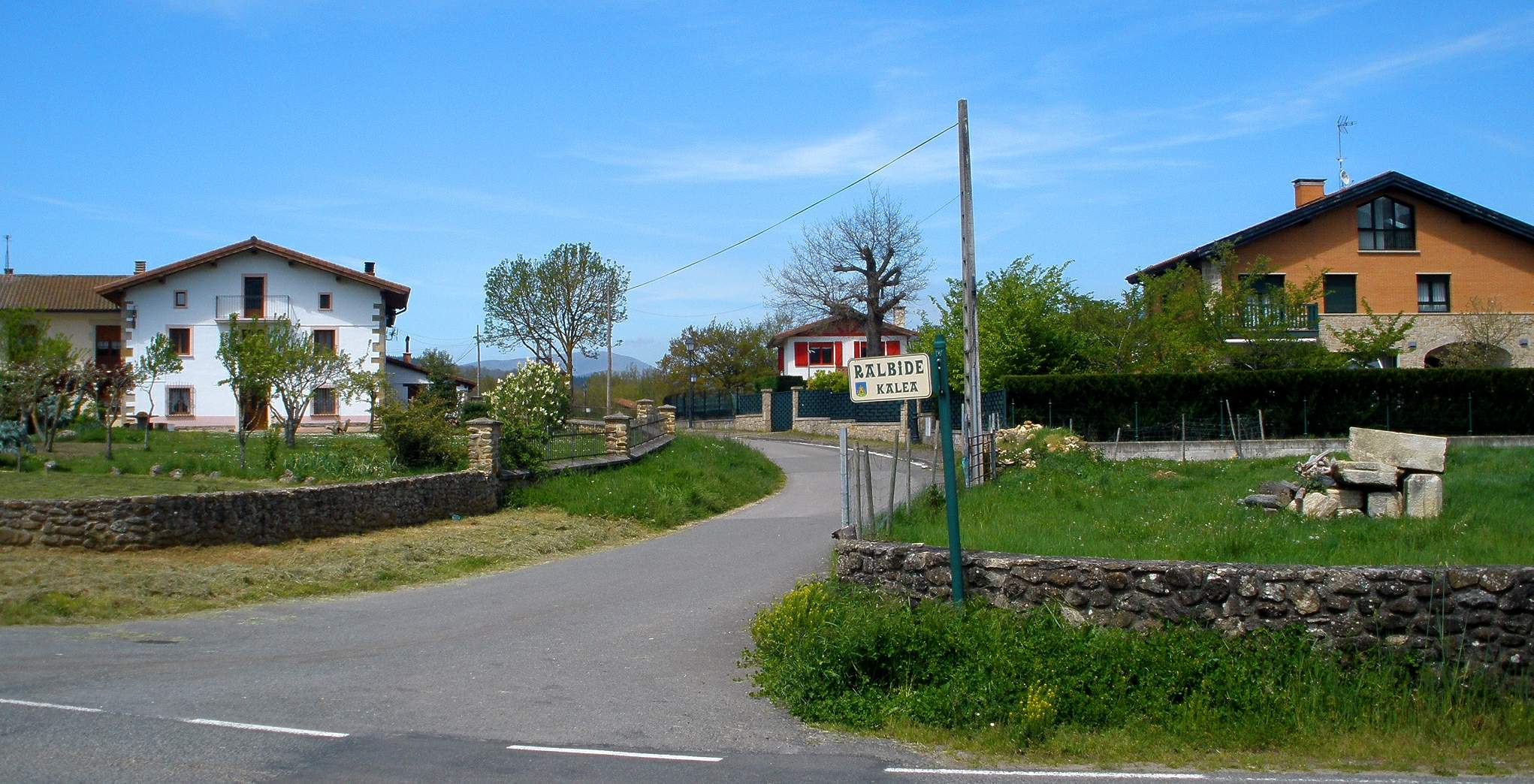
- Houses in Bitoriano

- Coat of arms

- Location within Álava Location within the Basque Country Location within Spain
- Coordinates: 42°57′01″N 2°49′45″W
- Country: Spain
- Autonomous community: Basque Country
- Province: Álava
- Comarca: Gorbeialdea
- Municipality: Zuia

Area
  - Total: 4.53 km^{2} (1.75 sq mi)
- Elevation: 683 m (2,241 ft)

Population (2021)
  - Total: 281
  - Density: 62.0/km^{2} (161/sq mi)
- Postal code: 01139

Bitoriano (Basque pronunciation: [bitoɾjano], [bitoɾi.ano]; Spanish: Vitoriano [bitoˈɾjano]) is a hamlet and concejo located in the municipality of Zuia, in Álava province, Basque Country, Spain.
