= Mendijur Ornithological Park =

Spanish Park

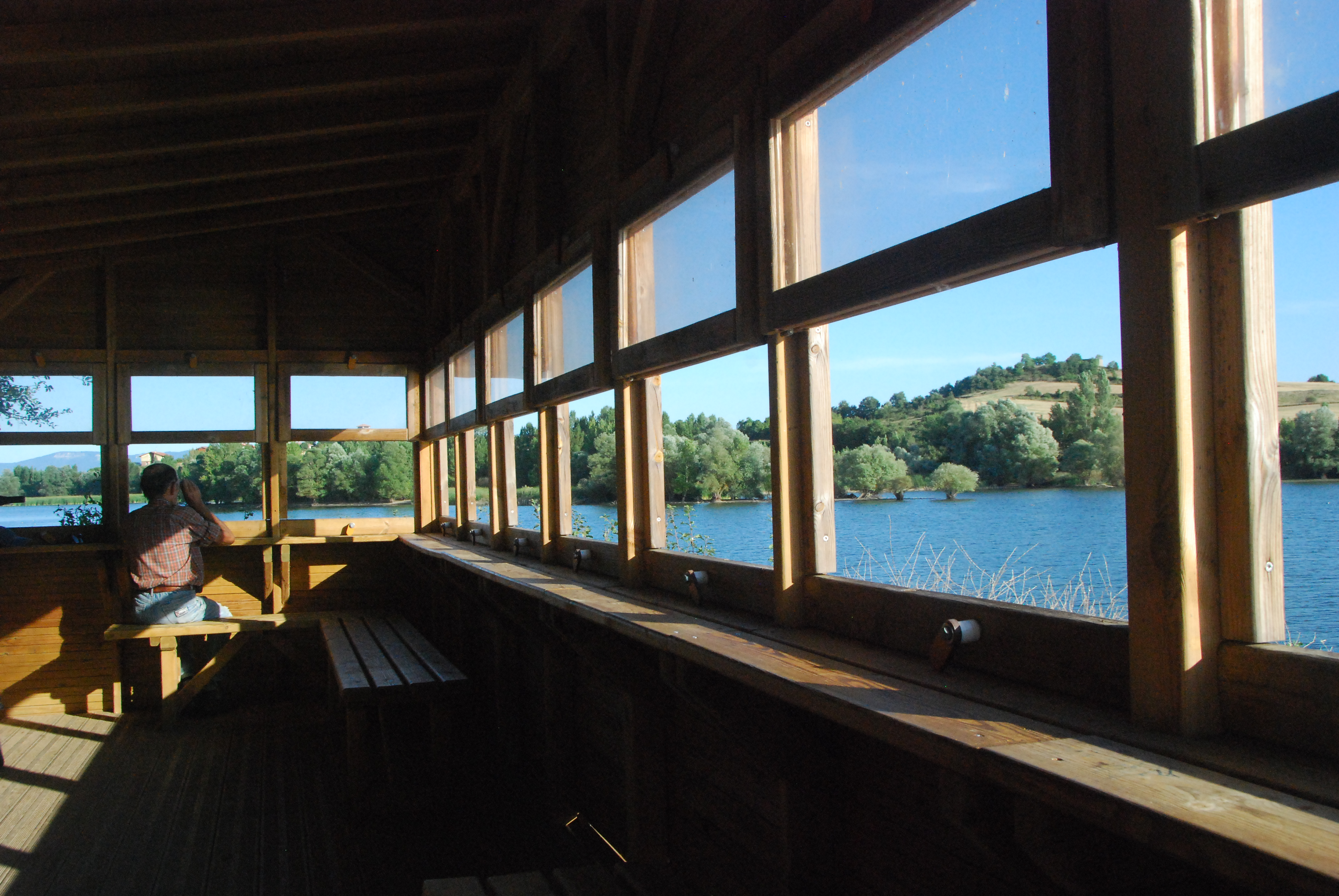
Bird blind at the park.

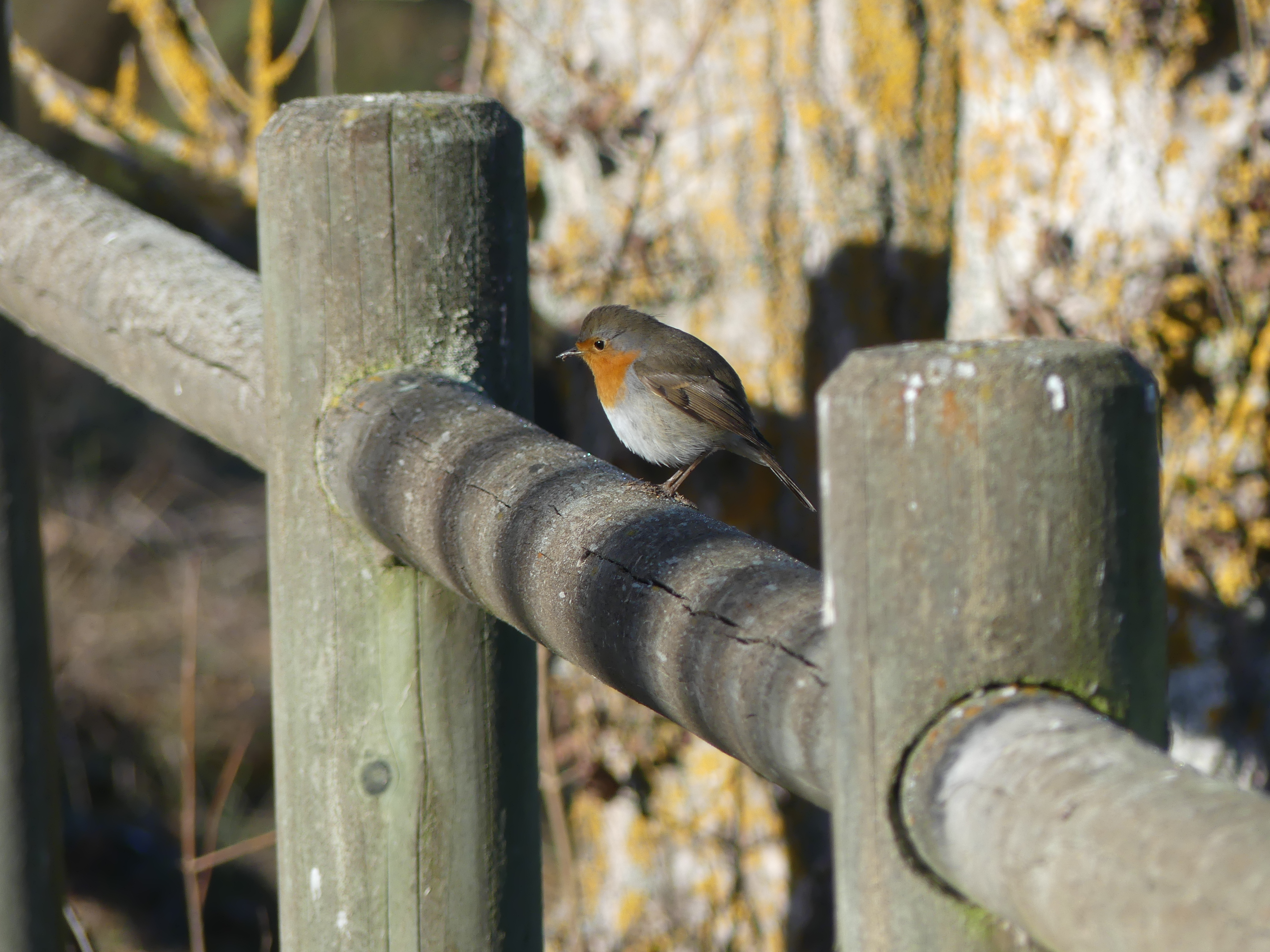
European robin (Erithacus rubecula) at the park.

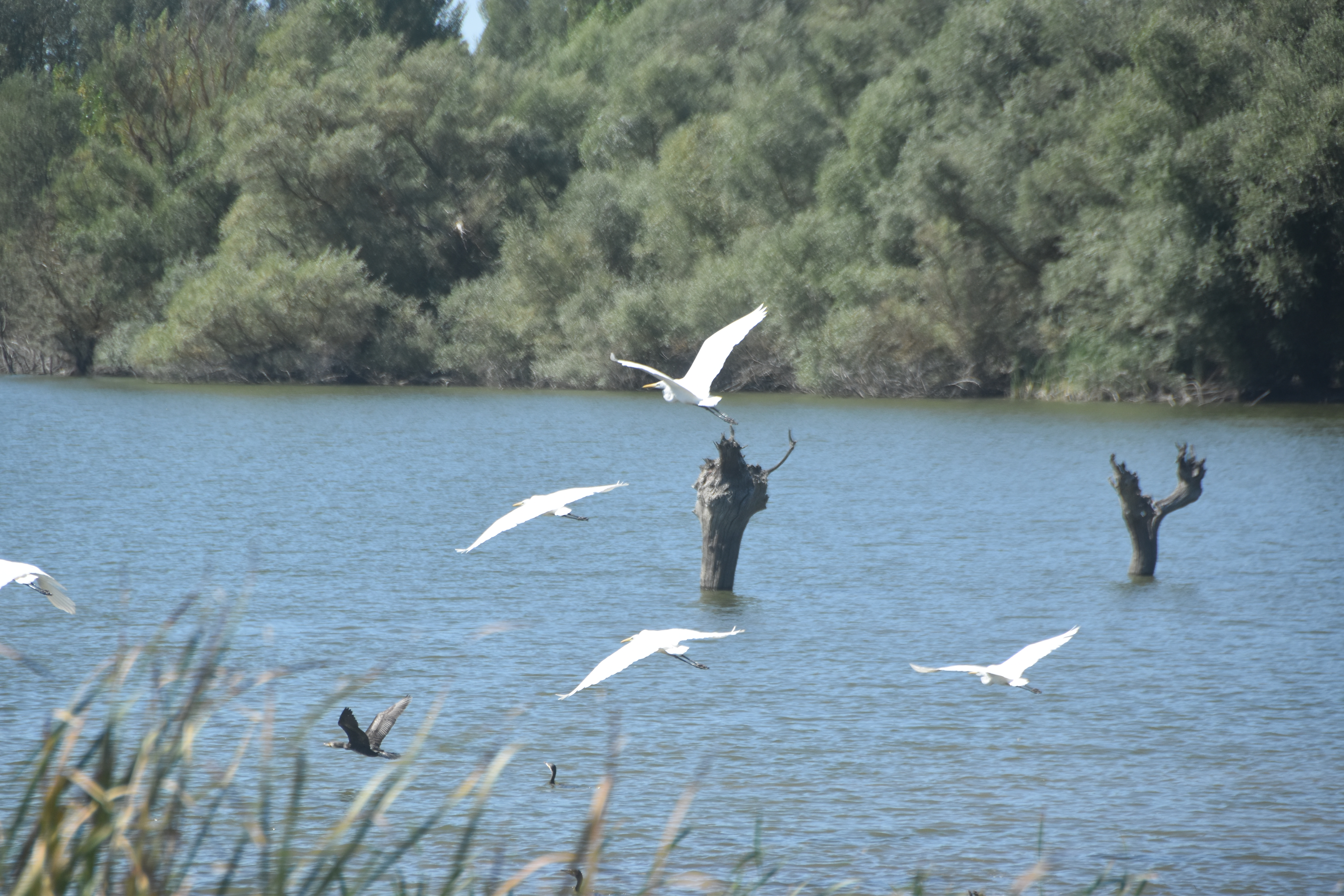
Egrets flying at the park.

The Mendijur Ornithological Park is located in Alava, Basque Country, Spain. The park has trails and bird blinds for visitor use. The park consists mainly of wetlands, along with forested areas, making it a home for a wide variety of waterfowl and other birds. Frequently spotted birds include various egrets and grebes, grey herons, and white storks.
