= Gorbeialdea =

Comarca in Álava, Spain

- Comarca
- Coat of arms

- Location within Álava
- Country: Spain
- Autonomous community: Basque Country
- Province: Álava
- Seat: Murgia

Government
  - President of the Council: Xabier Álvarez de Arkaia

Area
  - Total: 461.58 km^{2} (178.22 sq mi)

Population (2021)
  - Total: 10,011
  - Density: 21.689/km^{2} (56.173/sq mi)
- Time zone: UTC+1 (CET)
  - Summer (DST): UTC+2 (CEST)

Gorbeialdea (Note: Basque pronunciation: [gorβei.aldea], Spanish pronunciation: [ɡoɾbeʝalˈdea]. Formally in Basque: Gorbeialdeako kuadrilla, Spanish: Cuadrilla de Gorbeialdea. Until 2016, it was officially known as Zuia (unofficially in Spanish: Zuya).) is a comarca of the province of Álava, Basque Country, Spain. The capital is Murgia, in the municipality of Zuia.

== Municipalities ==
Municipality	Population (2021)	Surface (in km²)
Aramaio	1,457	73.27
Arratzua-Ubarrundia	1,017	57.41
Legutio	1,997	45.85
Urkabustaiz	1,420	60.49
Zigoitia	1,802	102.07
Zuia	2,318	122.49
Total	10,011	461.58
