= Araba Euskaraz =

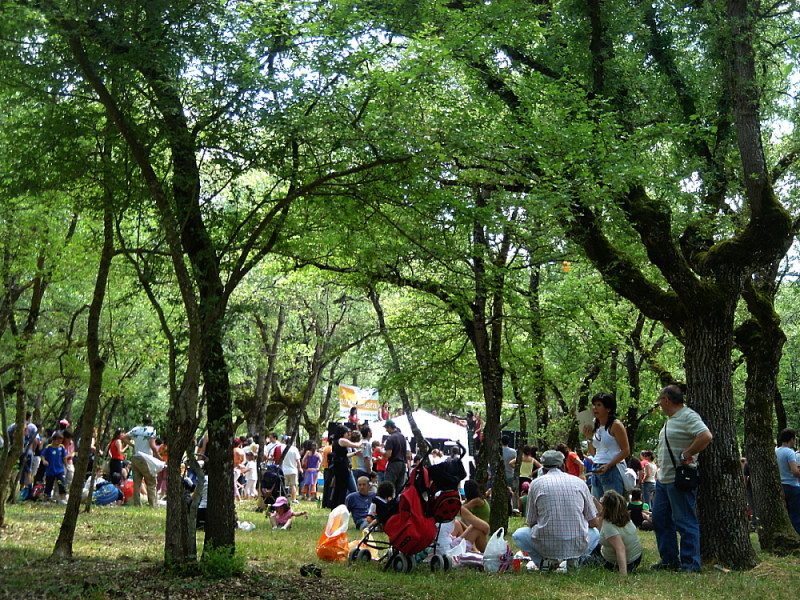
- Dates: Mid-June
- Frequency: Annually
- Location(s): Álava, Spain
- Years active: 1981–present
- Organised by: Ikastola-s from Álava

Araba Euskaraz is the festivity that ikastola-s (schools in which Basque is the language of instruction) of Álava celebrate. The Ikastola-s' Association organizes it annually in mid-June, and it was first organized in 1981 in Vitoria, capital of Álava.

Every year it is celebrate it in a different place by a different ikastola, with the aim of promote the use of Euskara in Álava, as well as helping to collect money to improve the infrastructures of the ikastola-s.

The celebration is organized around a circuit, where you are involve in certain activities that are aimed at the general public (concerts, performers, etc.). Different music groups get together this day to make a memorable and entertaining festival.

In 2015, it celebrated the 45th edition, which took place on June 14 under the theme "Piztu Euskara" and the logo of a bulb, an invitation to "turn on" the use of the Basque language. It has been decided to organize it in the capital mainly for economic reasons.

== All editions ==
- 1981 - Olarizu, Gasteiz (Theme: Araba Zazpi talde-bat euskararen alde).
- 1982 - Mendizorrotza, Gasteiz (Theme: Irakaskuntza publikoa: Euskara denontzat).
- 1983 - Laudio.
- 1984 - Oion.
- 1985 - Agurain.
- 1986 - Amurrio (Theme: Araban bultza euskararen martxa).
- 1987 - Kanpezu.
- 1988 - Izarra (Theme: Lurra goldatu, euskara loratu).
- 1989 - Bastida.
- 1990 - Abetxuku (Theme: Ikastolan arin arin, euskara zabal dadin).
- 1991 - Armentia, Gasteiz (Theme: Euskara bizia; ikastola, hazia).
- 1992 - Armentia, Gasteiz (Theme: Ikastolan geurea lantzen).
- 1993 - Laudio (Theme: Etorkizuna euskaraz!).
- 1994 - Lapuebla Labarka (Theme: Non eta mugan ).
- 1995 - Gasteiz (Theme: Baietz atera!).
- 1996 - Amurrio (Theme: Euskara guztiona).
- 1997 - Oion (Theme: Gorabidean).
- 1998 - Araia-Zalduondo (Theme: Orain dugu garaia).
- 1999 - Lapuebla Labarka (Theme: Uztaz uzta, alez ale).
- 2000 - Laudio (Theme: Txikia zainduz handitu).
- 2001 - Argantzun (Theme: Hazteko erein).
- 2002 - Zigoitia (Theme: Gure erronka).
- 2003 - Oion (Theme: Oro bil borobil).
- 2004 - Bastida (Theme: Uzta hartu, uztartuaz).
- 2005 - Amurrio (Theme: Ekiozu bideari).
- 2006 - Armentia, Gasteiz (Theme: Barruan daramagu).
- 2007 - Argantzun (Theme: Garenaren jostun).
- 2008 - Bastida (Theme: Ametsak dirau).
- 2009 - Oion (Theme: Hauspoari eraginez).
- 2010 - Agurain (Theme: Gogo biziz).
- 2011 - Laudio (Theme: Izan zirelako gara, garelako izango dira).
- 2012 - Bastida (Theme: Barneratu, Barreiatu).
- 2013 - Amurrio (Theme: Mihian kili-kili, euskaraz ibili).
- 2014 - Lapuebla de Labarca (Theme: Mugan Bizi, Bizi).
- 2015 - Armentia, Gasteiz (Organized by Oiongo ikastola; theme: Piztu euskara).
- 2016 - Agurain, (Organized by Lautada ikastola; theme: Geroari begira).

== Other similar celebrations ==
- Herri Urrats(Place: Ipar Euskal Herria).
- Ibilaldia (Place: Bizkaia).
- Kilometroak (Place: Gipuzkoa).
- Nafarroa Oinez (Place: Nafarroa).
