= Green Belt of Vitoria-Gasteiz =

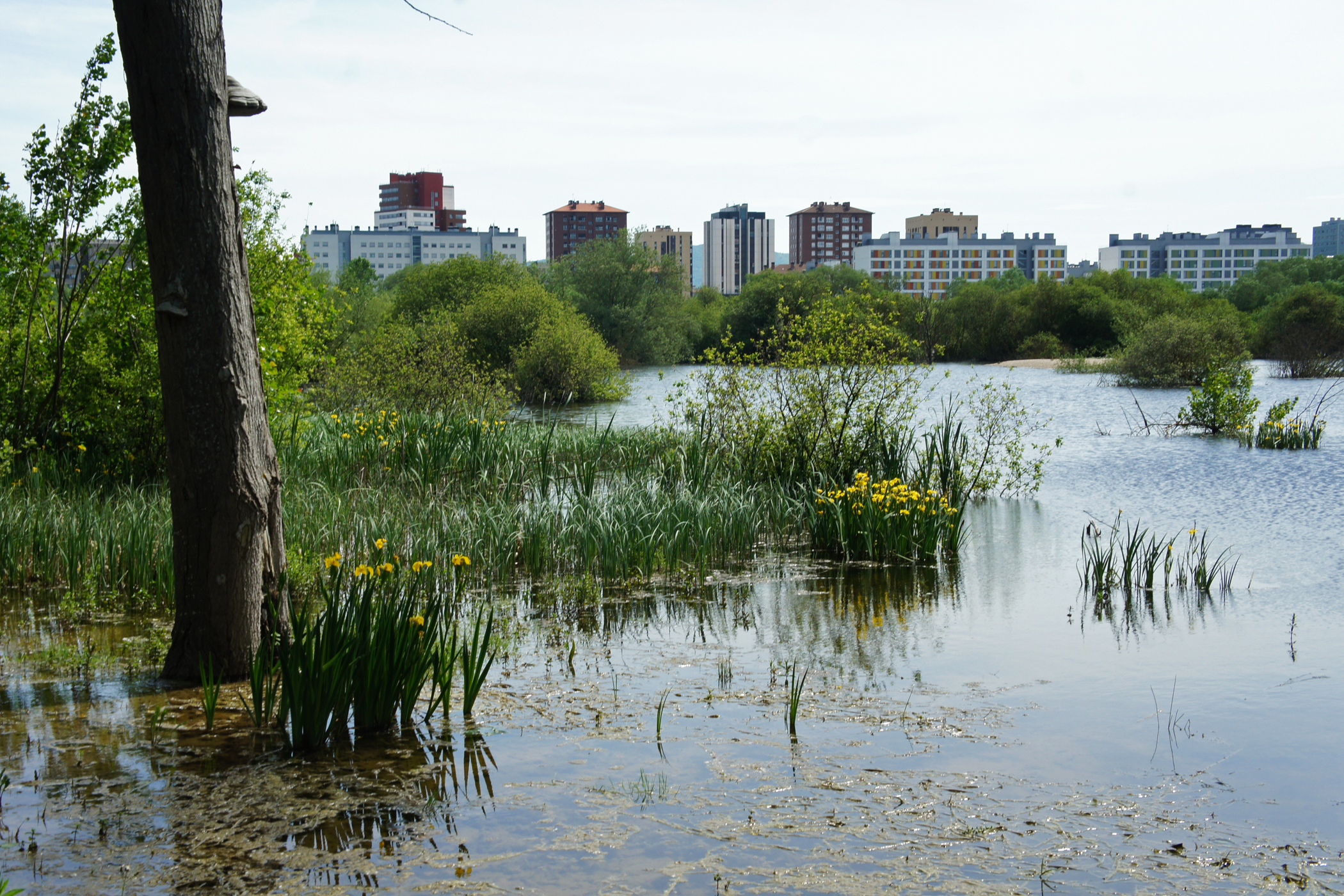
Salburua

The Green Belt of Vitoria-Gasteiz is a set of urban parks with high ecological value, strategically linked by eco-recreational corridors. It is the result of an ambitious plan of restoration and reclamation on the outskirts of the city that seeks to recover the ecological and social value of this space through the creation of a nature tour around the city articulated by various enclaves of high ecological value and landscape. It is the result of a project which began in the early 1990s and was selected by the UN among the 100 best global performances of the III International Competition "Best Practices for improving the living conditions of the cities", held in Dubai in the year 2000. Currently, it has five established parks: Armentia, Olarizu, Salburua, Zabalgana and Zadorra.

== History ==
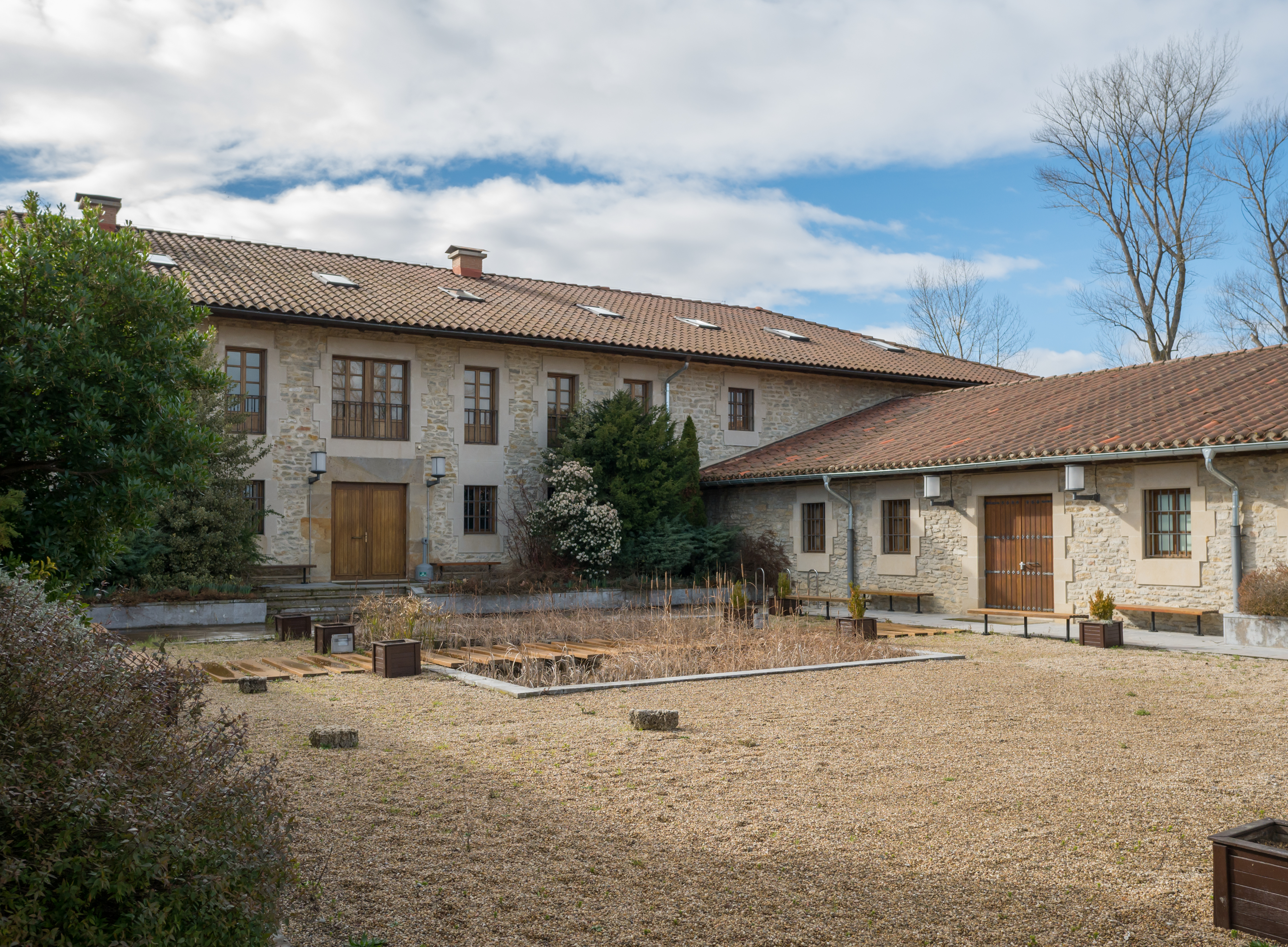
Casa de la Dehesa, seat of the Environmental Studies Center

The idea of the Green Belt came in the early 1990s in order to provide a comprehensive solution to the problems of the urban periphery of Vitoria-Gasteiz and the general state of disrepair that the area presented.

When the project began, on the outskirts of the city coexisted with high ecological value areas such as forests or Zabalgana Armentia that, although affected by problems of erosion, fire ... had managed to survive the urban and industrial expansion of the city, with gravel pits, dumps and other degraded sites that threatened the fragile survival of relict existing natural enclaves. The area offered a precarious and insecure to stay and ride, having become a physical and social barrier between the urban and rural adjacent.

To address existing problems and convert and / or enhance the value, if any, the suburbs, and residual clearly undervalued, Environmental Studies Center of the City of Vitoria-Gasteiz decided to undertake a large-scale project that encompasses all the periphery of the city and provide a solution to both areas operated as natural enclaves.

It was basically to create a network of suburban green spaces, an idea also found support and rationale within the management framework established by the General Urban Plan of 1986 that it proposed extending the system of urban green areas to areas peripherals.

== Parks ==
=== Alegria ===
Situated between the river Zadorra and wetlands of Salburua, the river Alegría and its banks represent today an important ecological corridor between these two valuable ecosystems, allowing the movement of such representative species as the European mink. It is a space for leisure activities, which connects the periurban Salburua park with the future fluvial park of the river Zadorra, in the Gamarra area.

=== Armentia ===
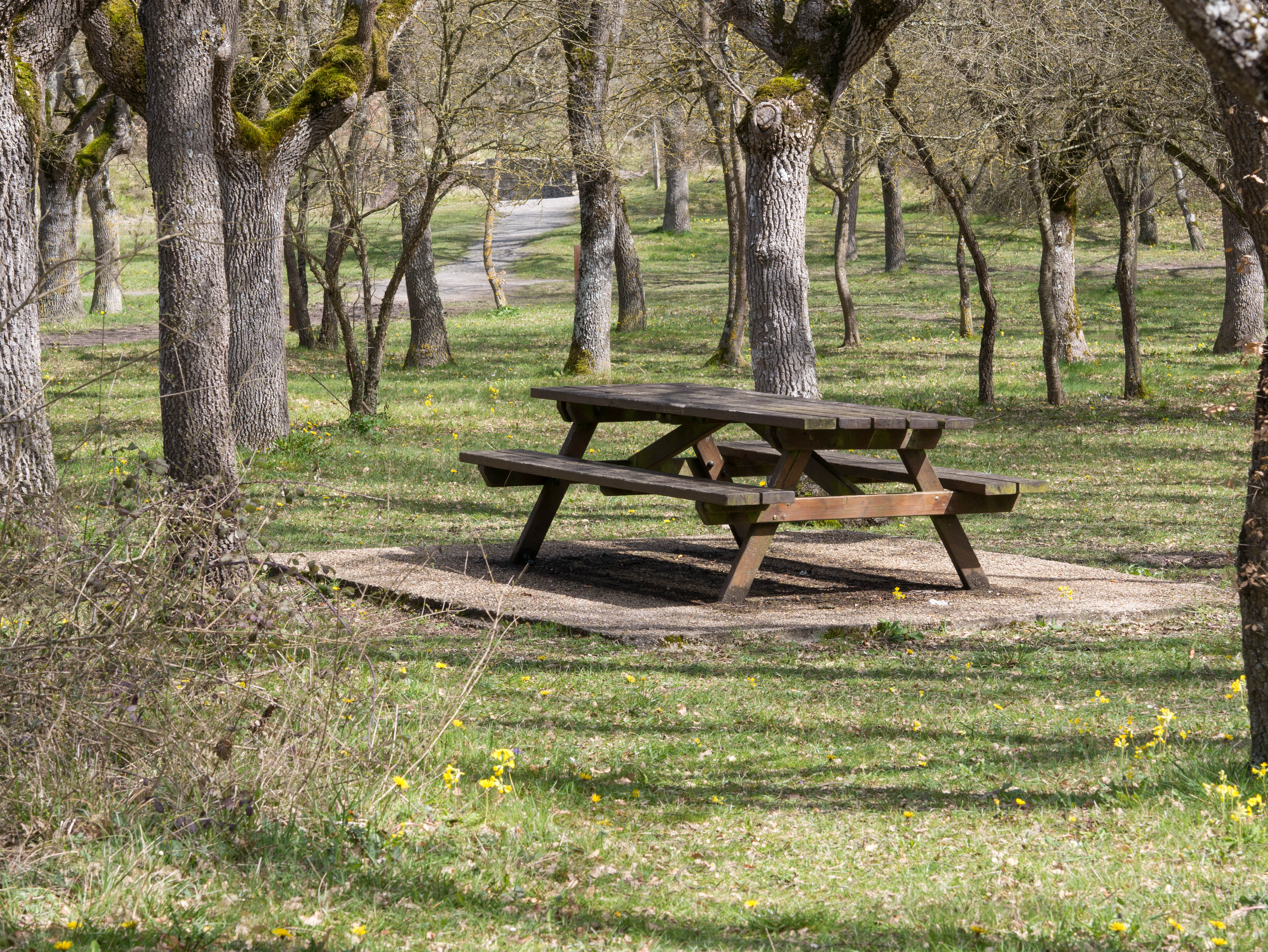
Picnic site in the Armentia Forest

This is a large natural oak forest, located between the city and the Mountains of Vitoria, the main mountain range and one of the most valuable natural areas in the municipality of Vitoria-Gasteiz. Precisely its location makes the Forest of Armentia a real biological corridor between the forest areas, green areas and peri-urban ecosystem, and in this paper lies the main value Armentia Park.

=== Olárizu ===
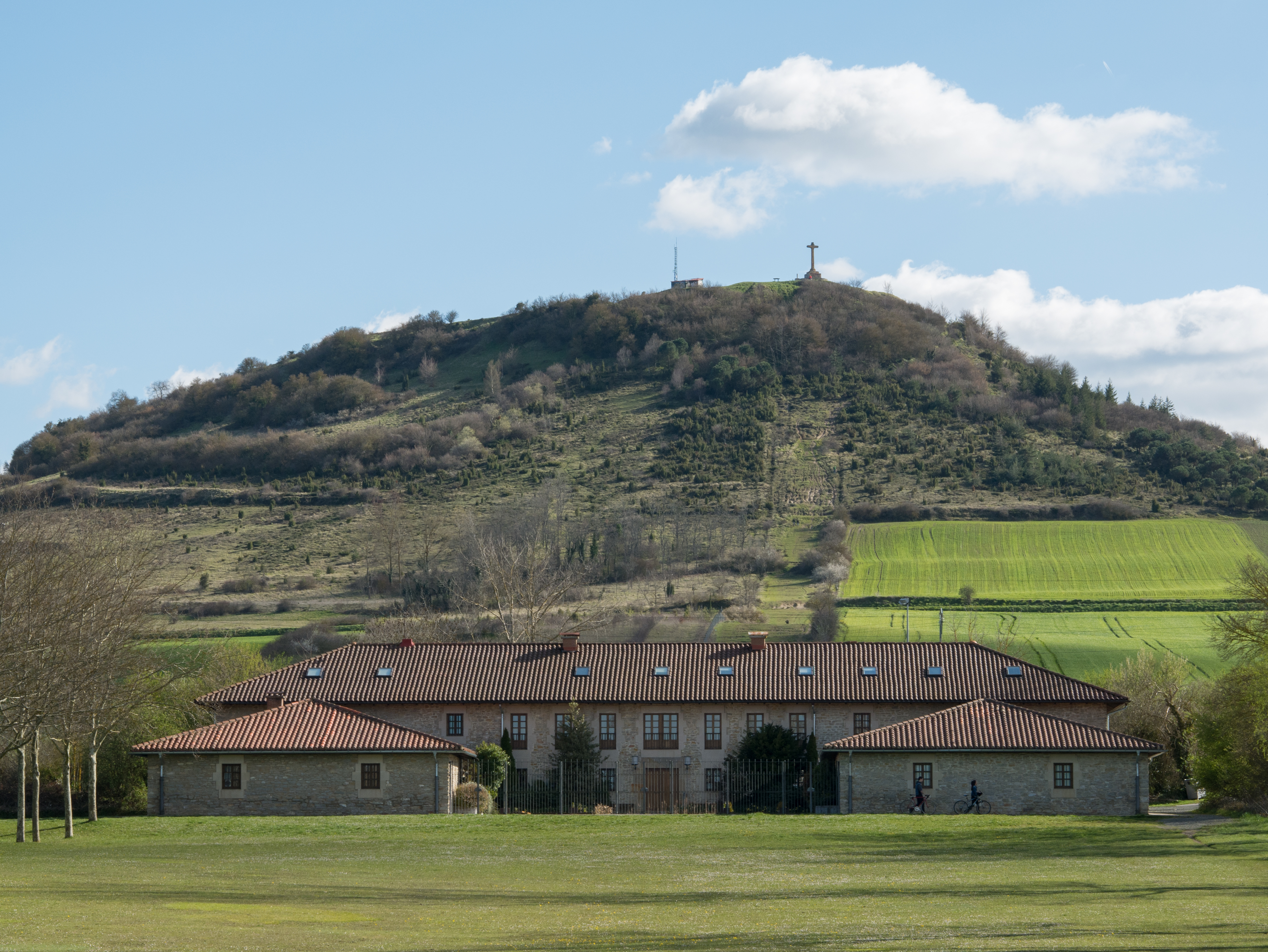
Olarizu mountain, Casa de la Dehesa and Olarizu meadows

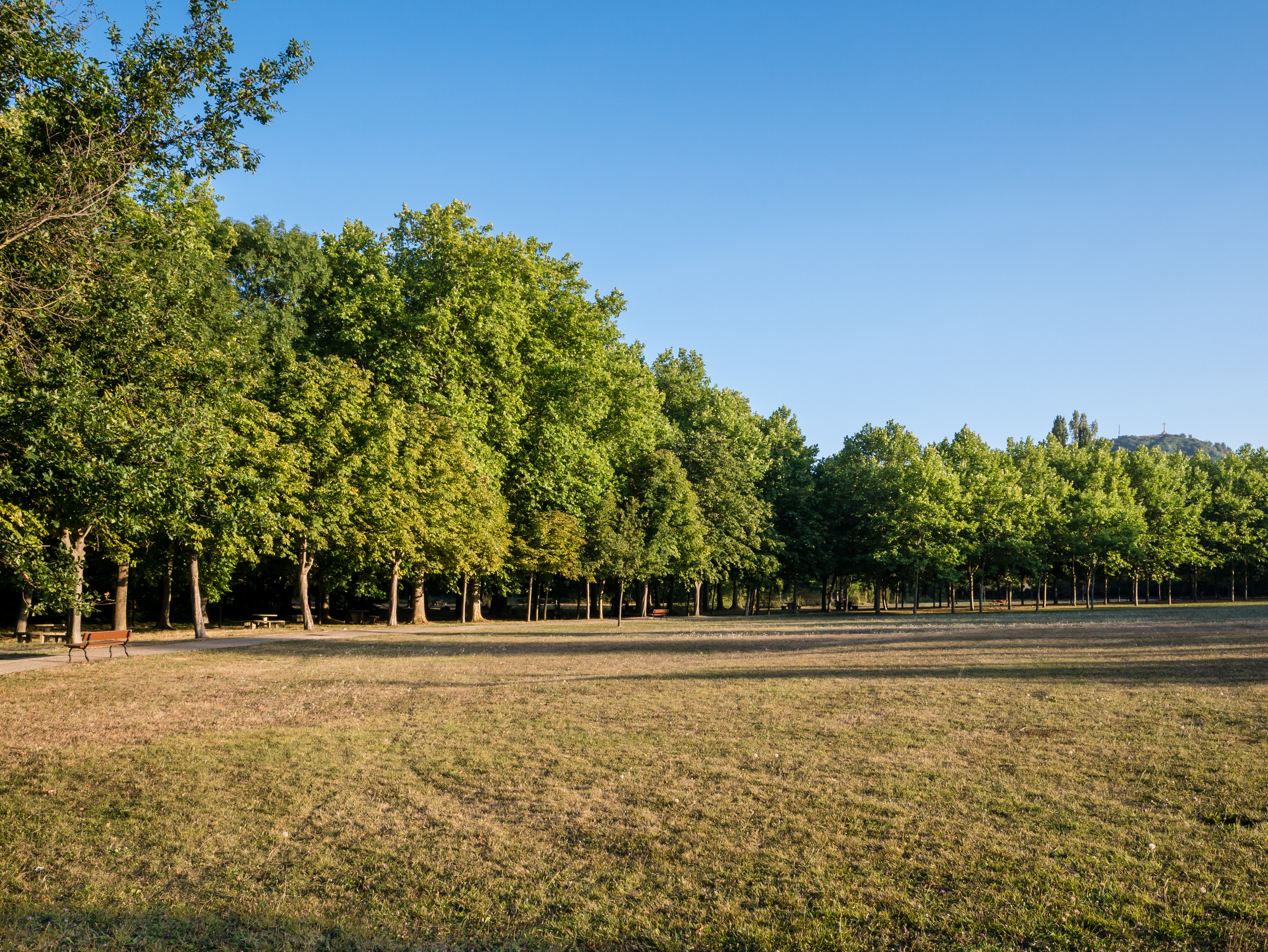
Olarizu Meadows

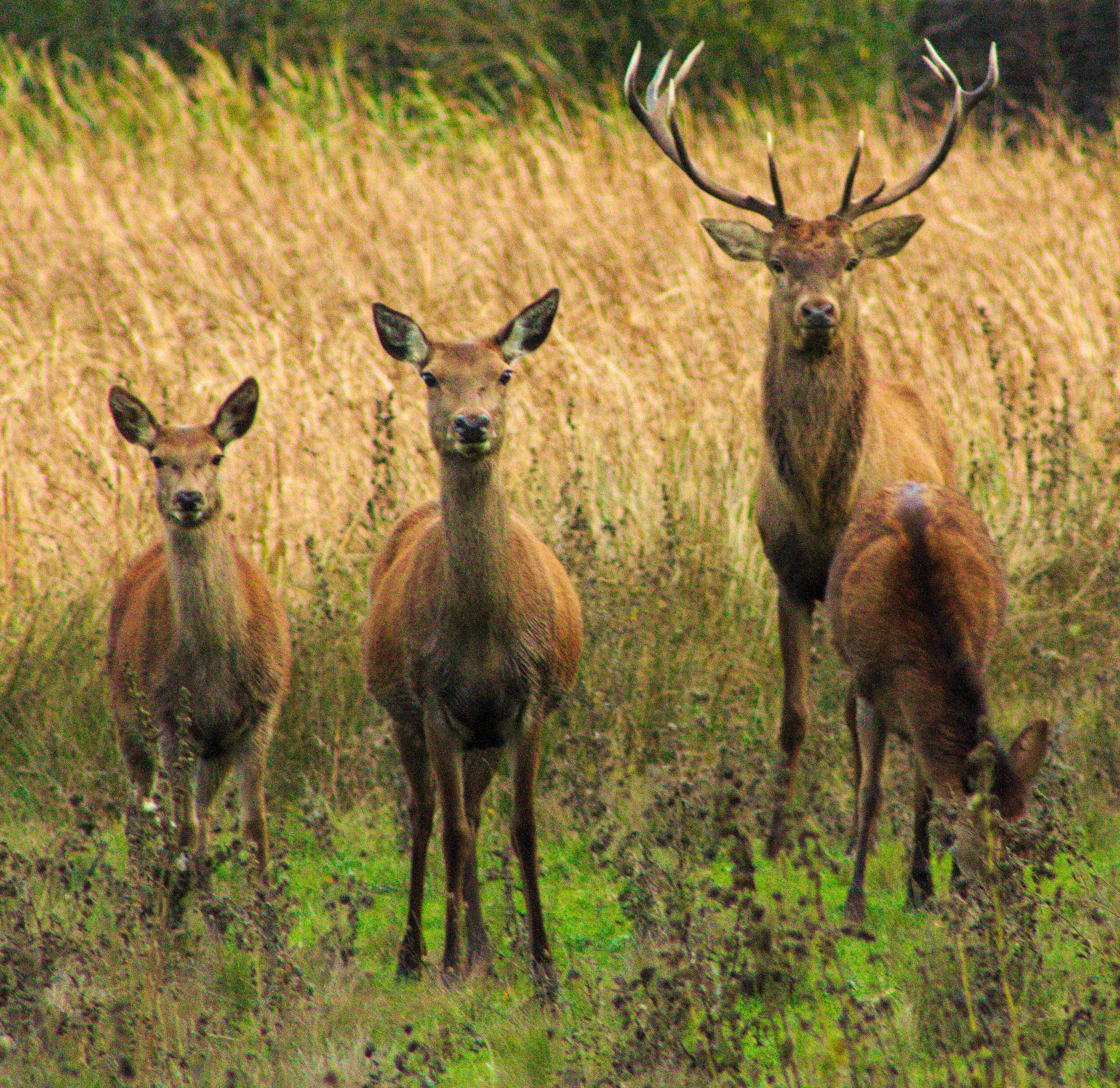
Deer in the Green Ring

The fields open stands of Olárizu, an iconic mountain and the many trails that run through there and connects the city with the nearby towns, make this park a popular spot that is ideal for walking or just stay (in authorized areas). Unlike the other parks in the Green Belt, Olarizu Park has a "less natural" and closer to the typically urban park concept, as it is with this character as originally conceived. Created in 1984 to the mid-90 becomes part of the Green Belt. Since then, his conditioning has been directed mainly to public use and to accept training and environmental education. Included among the grounds the Botanical Garden Olárizu.

=== Salburua ===
Salburua a wetland formed by several lakes (Arcaute and Betoño are the main ones), along with spaces and a small oak empradizados. The lakes dried centuries ago to transform the area into farmland, the restoration work started in 1994 have reversed this situation and now Salburua is one of the most valuable inland wetlands of the Basque Country and Ramsar Wetland of International Importance. The park can be visited through various routes that surround and connect major gaps. Facilities include the 'Interpretation Centre ATARIA' and two bird observatories.

=== Zabalgana ===
This park is the result of an intensive restoration process, which has become an area of old gravel pits, very degraded, in an area of natural interest suitable for leisure and recreation of the population. In the park of Zabalgana there are alternating meadows, scattered woodlots, ponds, small hills and ridges, sitting areas, trails and natural forest gall; it is a forest-island surrounded by a sea of crops.

=== Zadorra ===
The Zadorra river runs along the north part of the city acting as a limit to the city's expansion. Holder of important natural values that have motivated his statement as space SCI (Site of Community Interest) within the European Natura 2000 Network of Protected Natural Spaces, the Zadorra and its surroundings are an ideal space for walks. In the near future it will be possible to have an extensive river park 13 km long and a surface of 213 ha, which will act as a key link in the Green Ring, including wetlands and Salburua and Zabalgana.

== Future expansions ==
=== Errekaleor ===
The future park is bounded on the south Olarizu Park and north to wetlands Salburua, being included within the new residential expansion Salburua. Its location makes this place an important connecting element between the Green Belt parks located south and east of the city. The river Errekaleor ensure ecological connectivity while the Cerro de Las Neveras, noteworthy from the standpoint of landscape, will be included in the Green Belt as a promenade a must for great views. The design of this environment, which is provided as part of the redevelopment project of Salburua, will involve the expansion of the area of the Green Ring in 28 hectares.

== Objectives ==
- Promote the conservation of natural sites and ecological restoration per other recoverable peripheral areas, creating a natural continuum around the city.
- Integrate suburban parks in the urban fabric, while connecting with the natural environment, thus improving the accessibility and environmental security among urban green areas and natural areas of the municipality.
- Put up the suburbs to promote the public use them, helping to meet the public demand for more outdoor recreation while lessening the pressure on other fragile natural areas.
- Take advantage of the recovery and conditioning of new spaces to promote awareness and environmental education with the last attempt to involve citizens in conservation.

== Maintenance ==
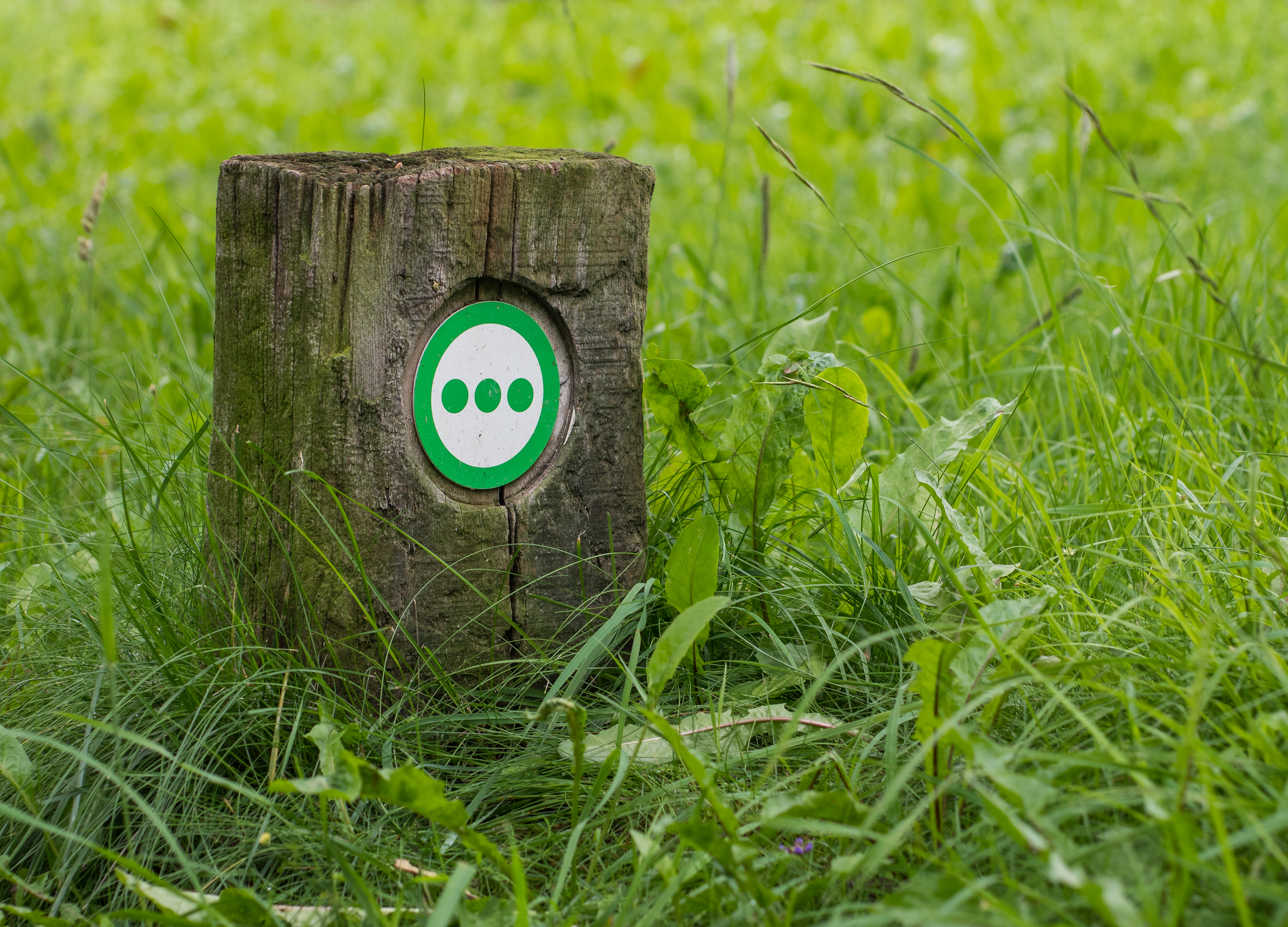
Green Belt trail marking

There is a permanent maintenance service in the Green Belt that monitors the state of conservation of the plants in the Parks including the mowing of grass and treed meadows, irrigation, digging, fertilising, hoeing, pruning, replacing dead plants, sowing and planting, as well as other related tasks.

There is also a service responsible for maintaining the equipment and signposting in the Green Belt. Its work includes ensuring that these are kept in the best possible state of conservation, as well as the repair, refitting and replacement of damaged equipment due to normal wear and tear or due to accidents or vandalism.

The overall maintenance of the Belt includes a general cleaning service that comprises the clearing of riverbanks after periods of flooding, the removal of rubbish and graffiti from signposts and equipment and other tasks.

== See also ==
- Vitoria-Gasteiz
- Álava
- Park of Armentia
