= Ibilaldia =

Annual festival in Biscay, Spain

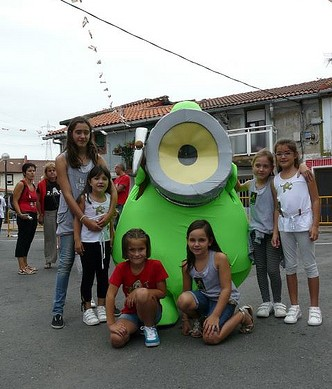
- Ibiltxo, the mascot of Ibilaldia'2012, with children from Trapagaran
- Genre: Basque culture
- Date: End of May
- Frequency: Annual
- Locations: Trapagaran, Biscay, Basque Country
- Years active: 1978-present
- Inaugurated: 1978
- Website: www.ibilaldia.com

Ibilaldia (Basque: Ibilaldia), meaning trip, journey, or march in English, is a festival organized every year the last Sunday of May or first of June to help the ikastolak (schools in the Basque language) in Biscay, Basque Country in Spain.

Ibilaldia is essentially a volunteer walk around a circuit of 5-10 kilometers, that is surrounded by food stands and entertainment, and walkers sometimes make the walk in support of an organization. The money they collect it is used to help the Basque schools in the province of Biscay. It is celebrated too to reinforce Basque culture and language. As a solidary fest, everything is organized by the Ikastolas. Each year a different village is the organizer. Parents, teachers and students help to have everything prepared for the main day.

== History ==
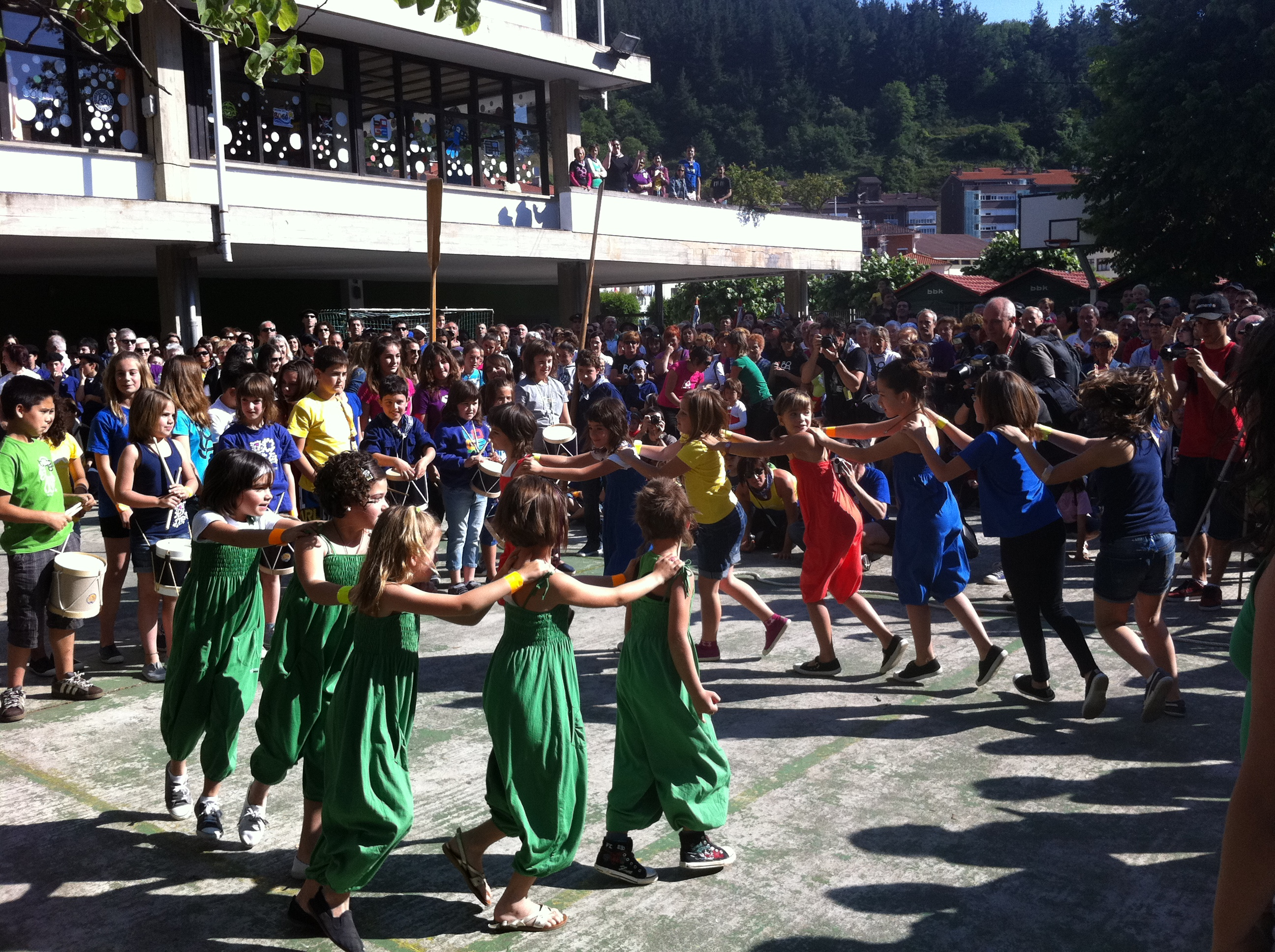
Ibilaldia festival held in Biscay, 2011

At the end of the 1970s the movement created to promote the use of Basque language in schools grew a lot and started to be structured. The festival of Ibilaldia was born in 1978 in Getxo promoted by this general context of creation of new ikastolas. From 1981 it became an annual public event organized in these villages:

1978. Getxo
1980. Durango-Abadiano
1981. Bilbao
1982. Portugalete
1983. Lekeitio
1984. Getxo-Berango
1985. Bermeo. Organized by the "Ikastola Eleizalde"
1986. Arrigorriaga
1987. Amorebieta-Etxano. 1987/06/21.
1988. Bilbao (Txurdinaga). 1988/05/29.
1989. Muskiz. 1989/05/21.
1990. Sopelana. 1990/05/27.
1991. Gernika. 1991/06/02.
1992. Durango. 1992/05/31.
1993. Ondarroa. 1993/05/23.
1994. Bilbao-La Peña-Abusu-Arrigorriaga. 1994/05/29. Organized by the "Ikastola Abusu".
1995. Santurtzi. Organized by the "Bihotz Gaztea Ikastola" 1995/06/06.
1996. Valle de Trápaga. Organized by the "Itxaropena Ikastola" 1996/05/26.
1997. Getxo-Leioa. 1997/05/25.
1998. Munguia. 1998/05/31.
1999. Elorrio. 1999/06/06.
2000. Balmaseda. 2000/05/28. Organized by the "Ikastola Zubi Zaharra".
2001. Bilbao-La Peña-Abusu-Arrigorriaga. 2001/05/27. Organized by the "Ikastola Abusu".
2002. Getxo. 2002/05/26. Organized by the "Ikastola San Nikolas".
2003. Lekeitio. 2003/05/18.
2004. Leioa - Sopelana. 30/05/2004. Organized by the "Ikastolas Ander Deuna" and "Betiko".
2005. Durango. 29/05/2005. Organized by the "Ikastolas Ibaizabal" and "Kurutziaga".
2006. Elorrio. 29/05/2006. Organized by the "Ikastola Txintxiki".
2007. Balmaseda. 20/05/2007. Organized by the "Ikastola Zubi Zaharra".
2008. Amorebieta-Etxano. 2008/05/25. Organized by the "Ikastola Andra Mari".
2009. Galdakao. Organized by the "Ikastola Eguzkibegi".
2010. Bermeo. Organized by the"Ikastola Eleizalde".
2011. Ondarroa. Organized by the "Ikastola Zubi Zahar".
2012. Trapagaran. Organized by the "Ikastola Itxaropena"
2013. Portugalete. Organized by the "Asti-Leku Ikastola"
2014. Gernika-Lumo. 2014/06/07. Organized by theSeber Altube ikastola.
2015. Bilbao. 2015/05/31. Organized by theHarrobia ikastola.

== Similar festivals ==
These are the festivals organized in other provinces of the Basque Country:

- Kilometroak in Gipuzkoa.
- Nafarroa Oinez in Navarre.
- Herri Urrats in the Northern Basque Country in France
- Araba Euskaraz in Araba.
