= Cascada de Gujuli =

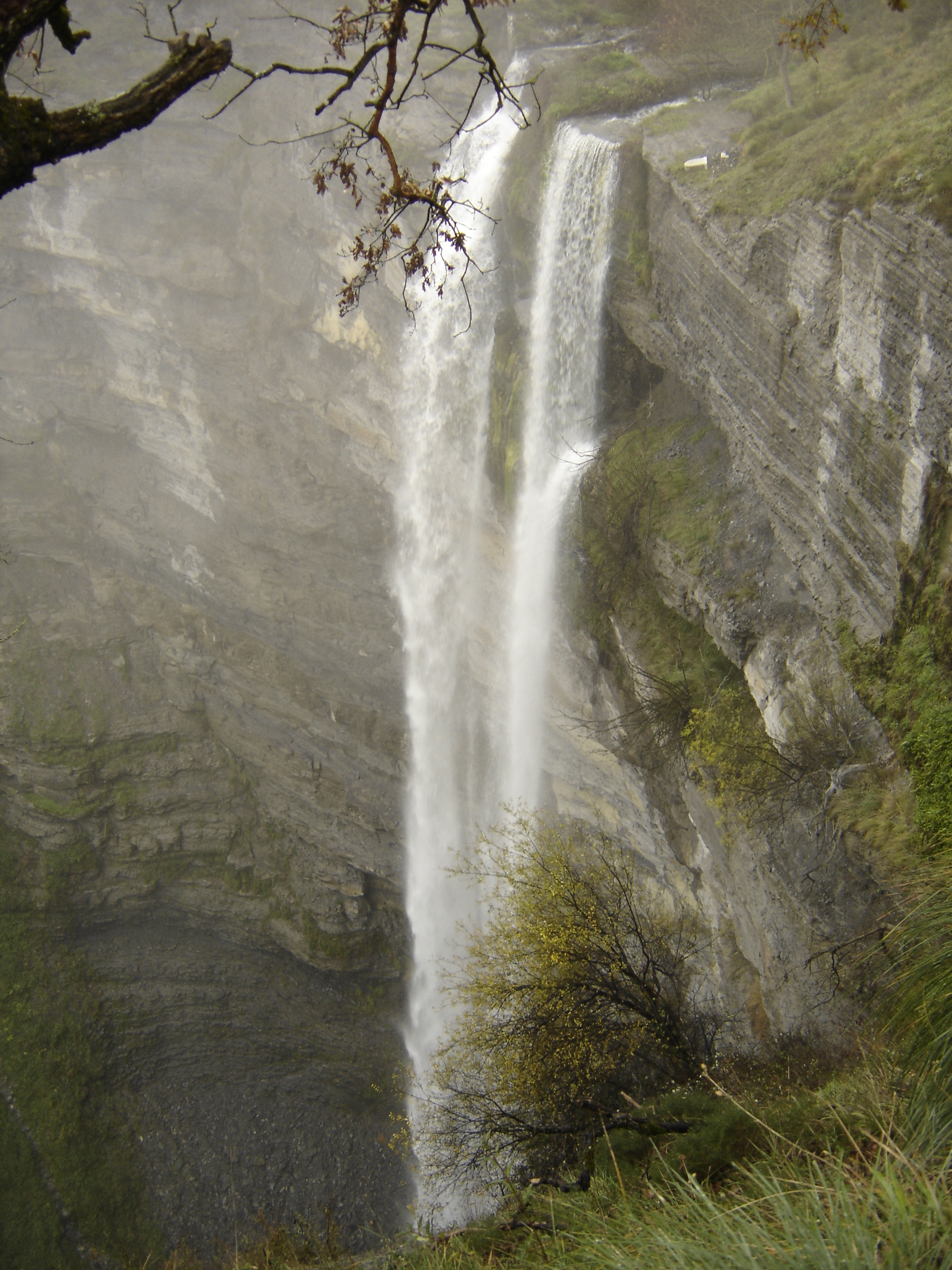
- Cascada de Gujuli
- Interactive map of Cascada de Gujuli
- Location: Spain
- Coordinates: 42°59′00″N 2°55′00″W
- Total height: 100 m (330 ft)
- Number of drops: 1
- Watercourse: Oiardo stream

The Cascada de Gujuli (Basque: Goiuriko ur-jauzia) is a waterfall with a vertical drop of over 100 m (330 ft) near the village of Gujuli, in the municipality of Urkabustaiz, Álava province, Spain. The waterfall is found along the Arroyo Oiardo in Gorbea Natural Park, about 30 km northwest of Vitoria-Gasteiz on the road between Orduña and Murgia.

The flow of the waterfall practically ceases during the summer.
