= Izarra =

Izarra can refer to:

- Izarra, Álava, a village in Álava, Spain
- Izarra (liqueur), a herbal liqueur from the Northern Basque Country
- Adina Izarra (born 1959), a Venezuelan musician, music educator and composer
- CD Izarra, a football club from Navarre
