= Nivelle (disambiguation) =

Nivelle is a commune in northern France.

Nivelle may also refer to:

- Nivelle (river), a river in southwestern France
- Robert Nivelle (1856–1924), French artillery officer who became Commander-in-Chief of the French Army on the Western Front in 1916

== See also ==
- Nivelles, a town in central Belgium
- Nivelle offensive, in World War I, named after General Robert Nivelle
- Battle of Nivelle, in 1813 near the river Nivelle
