= Unzá-Apreguíndana =

Concejo in Álava, Spain

Untza-Apregindana
- Concejo
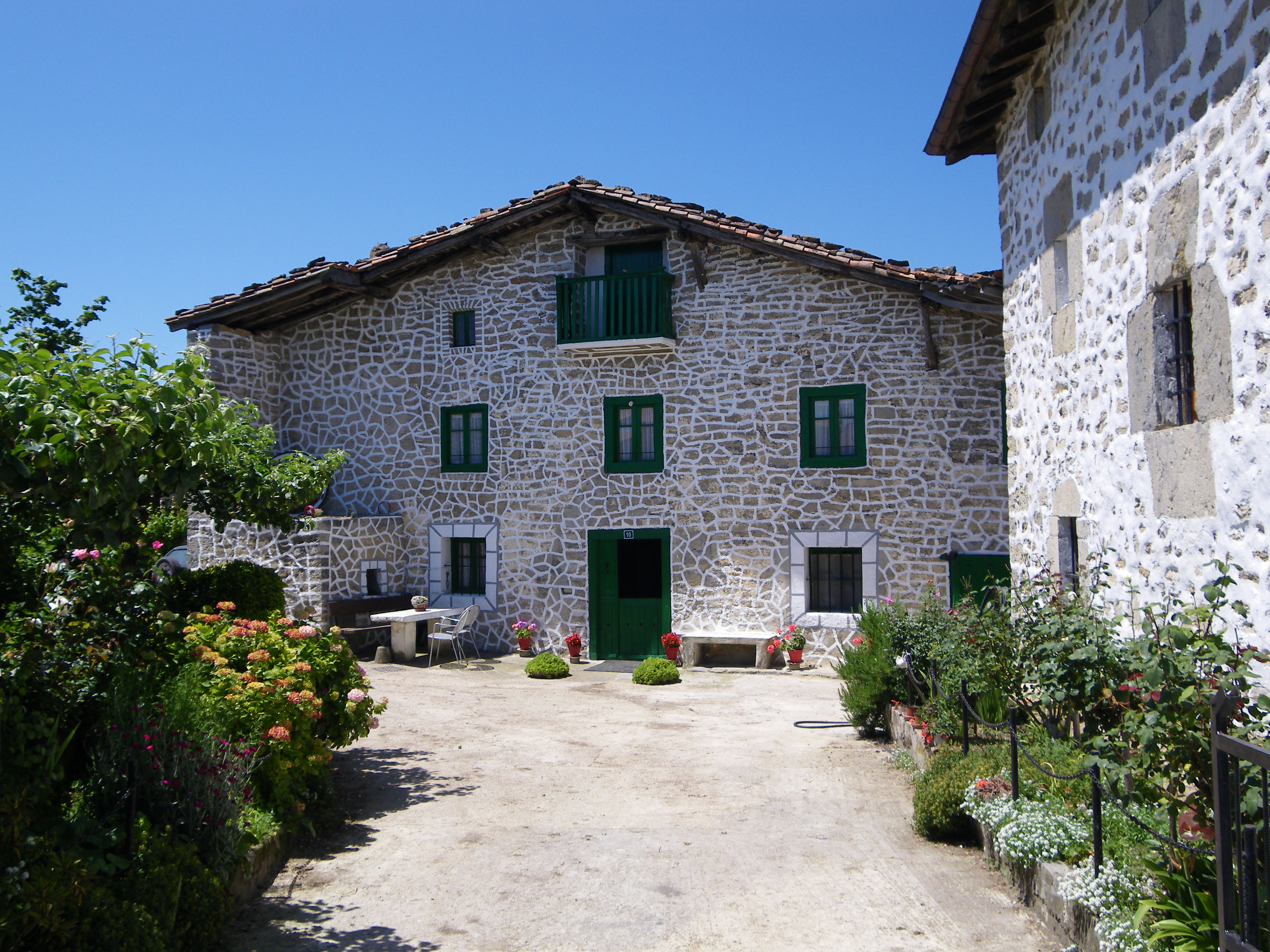
- A house in Untza

- Location within Álava Location within the Basque Country Location within Spain
- Coordinates: 43°N 3°W
- Country: Spain
- Autonomous community: Basque Country
- Province: Álava
- Comarca: Gorbeialdea
- Municipality: Urkabustaiz
- Elevation: 663 m (2,175 ft)

Population (2023)
  - Total: 62
- Postal code: 01449

Untza-Apregindana (Spanish: Unzá-Apreguíndana) is a concejo in the municipality of Urkabustaiz, in Álava province, Basque Country, Spain. It includes the hamlets of Untza (Spanish: Unzá, alternatively in Basque: Untzaga) and Apregindana (Spanish: Apreguíndana).
