= Goiuri-Ondona =

Concejo in Álava, Spain

- Concejo
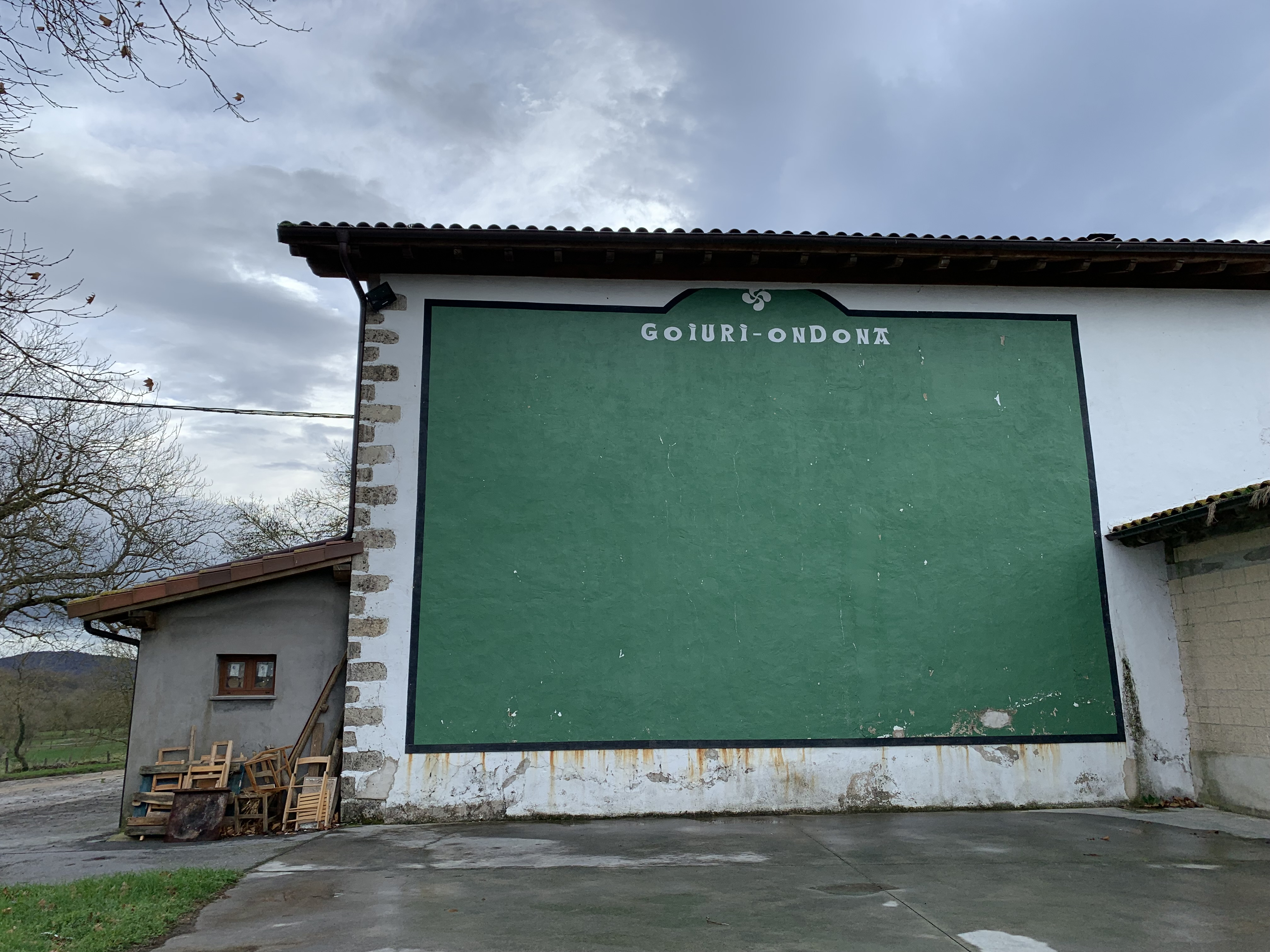

- Location within Álava Location within the Basque Country Location within Spain
- Coordinates: 42°58′36″N 2°55′06″W
- Country: Spain
- Autonomous community: Basque Country
- Province: Álava
- Comarca: Gorbeialdea
- Municipality: Urkabustaiz

Area
  - Total: 4.11 km^{2} (1.59 sq mi)
- Elevation: 622 m (2,041 ft)

Population (2023)
  - Total: 56
  - Density: 14/km^{2} (35/sq mi)
- Postal code: 01449

Goiuri-Ondona (Spanish: Gujuli-Ondona) is a concejo in the municipality of Urkabustaiz, in Álava province, Basque Country, Spain. It includes the hamlets of Goiuri (Spanish: Gujuli) and Ondona. One of the highest waterfalls in Spain is located nearby.
