= Kilometroak =

- Genre: Basque culture
- Date: First Sunday of October
- Frequency: Annual
- Locations: Gipuzkoa, Basque Country
- Years active: 1977–present
- Inaugurated: 1977
- Website: www.kilometroak.eus

Kilometroak (lit. 'kilometres' in Basque) is a festival organized every year on the first Sunday of October to reach out to the ikastolas (Basque language schools) in Gipuzkoa, Basque Country, Spain.

Kilometroak consists of walking down a circuit of 5–10 kilometers, one dotted with food stands and entertainment. Participants sometimes represent a certain organization, and the money collected is used to assist the Basque language schools in the province of Gipuzkoa. It also aims at raising Basque culture and language awareness, as well as highlighting community bonds. Each year a different town organizes the event. Parents, teachers and students volunteer and plan ahead to have everything arranged for the day of the festival, and contribute until it is over at dusk.

== History and description ==
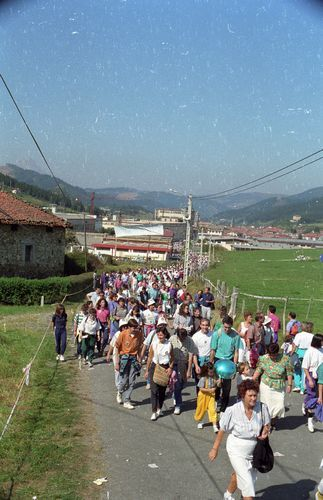
Kilometroak 1989 in Oñati

The festival is organized by the Ikastola Federation of the Basque Country on a yearly basis in different locations. It first took place on October 16, 1977 (Beasain-Lazkao) along the lines of Josu Ergüin's design, modeled after a similar Californian event. He was assisted in the design by J. Ramon Beloqui and Martin Ibarbia. When other Basque districts followed suit creating their own similar marches, the Kilometroak turned into a Gipuzkoa-specific festival.

The participation consists of marching for a number of kilometers, paying a voluntary admission to the organization. The circuit features and showcases cultural and sport activities, farmer products, or entertainment shows, such as concerts, theater, or rural sports.

The sponsors may be individuals, renowned personalities, or entities. Usually tens of thousands turn out, including personalities of Basque art, sports, politics and culture. The funds raised are managed by the Ikastola Federation, who destines a share to the Basque language schools lying on the area where the festival takes place.

== List of towns hosting the event ==
1977: Beasain-Lazkao; 1978: Zubieta; 1979: Azpeitia; 1980: Tolosa; 1981: Mondragón; 1982: Hernani; 1983: San Sebastián; 1984: Errenteria; 1985: Zumarraga-Urretxu-Legazpi; 1986: Deba; 1987: Zarautz; 1988: Irun; 1989: Oñati; 1990: Andoain; 1991: Bergara; 1992: Oiartzun; 1993: Ordizia; 1994: Legazpi; 1995: San Sebastián; 1996: Elgoibar; 1997: Pasaia-Lezo; 1998: Tolosaldea; 1999: Errenteria; 2000: Azpeitia; 2001: Beasain; 2002: Zumarraga-Urretxu; 2003: Lazkao; 2004: Orio -Zarautz; 2005: Leintz; 2006: Oiartzun; 2007: Bergara; 2008: Irura; 2009: San Sebastián; 2010: Lezo; 2011: Azpeitia; 2012: Andoain; 2013: Tolosa; 2014: Orio; 2015: Usurbil

== Similar festivals ==
- Ibilaldia in Biscay
- Nafarroa Oinez in Navarre
- Araba Euskaraz in Álava
- Herri Urrats in the French Basque Country
