= Park of Armentia =

Coordinates: 42°49′19″N 2°42′46″W

The park of Armentia (Spanish: El bosque de Armentia) is a gall-oak forest located between Vitoria-Gasteiz and the Mountains of Vitoria, in the province of Álava and of the autonomous community of the Basque Country in northern Spain. It has a surface area of 165 hectares (410 acres) and it is one of the main biological areas in the surroundings because it has a variety of flora and fauna.

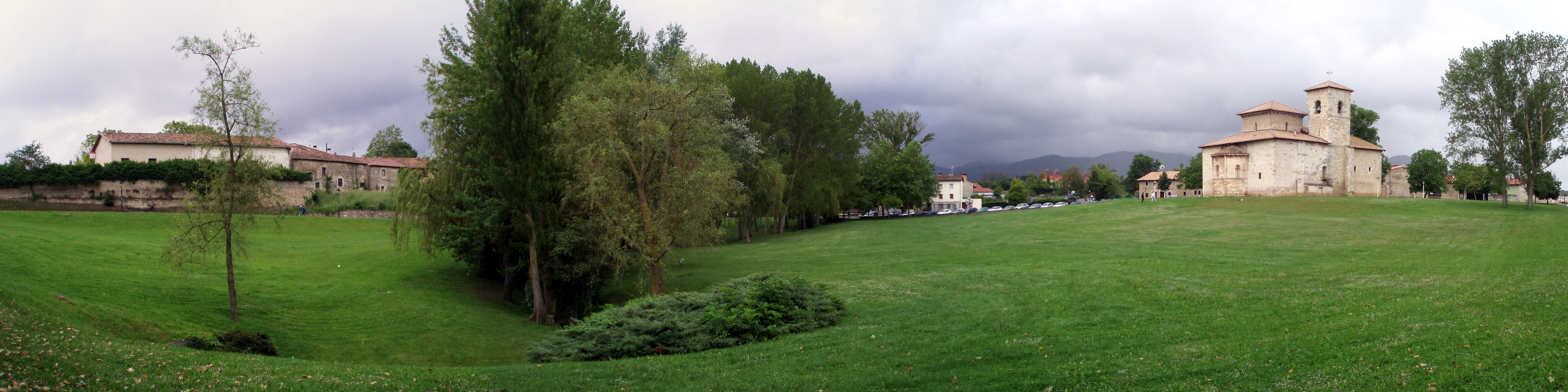
A panoramic of Armentia.

== Biodiversity ==
The Park of Armentia stands out due to the vast area of natural trees it includes, over 70% of the whole surface. This significant forest mass has been enlarged in the last 25 years, including a great variety of trees which broaden and enrich the park.

=== Fauna ===
The different environments that exist in the park are home to a rich and varied fauna including wild boars, squirrels, birds of prey and even about 30 species of small birds such as goldfinches, chaffinches, robins and great tits. Specially, birds are the most common residents of the forest, among many others, goshawks and falcons.

=== Flora ===
The forest of Armenia contains a number of different environments. There are areas of thick vegetation in which, in addition to gall oaks, there are maples, hawthorns, blackthorns and blackberry bushes, followed by areas of more scattered woodland with large clearings in some places, in which heather, badassi and juniper grow. Another thing worth mentioning is that many beginner biologists come and pick the leaves of the different trees, due to the large variety.

The Artetxo sitting area contains a number of outstanding examples of mature gall oaks with a curious "candelabra-like" shape, a consequence of pruning done over a number of years for firewood. On the ridges beech, holly and rowan can be found and along the edges of the small streams that flow through the Park, maple, hazel and ash are very common too.

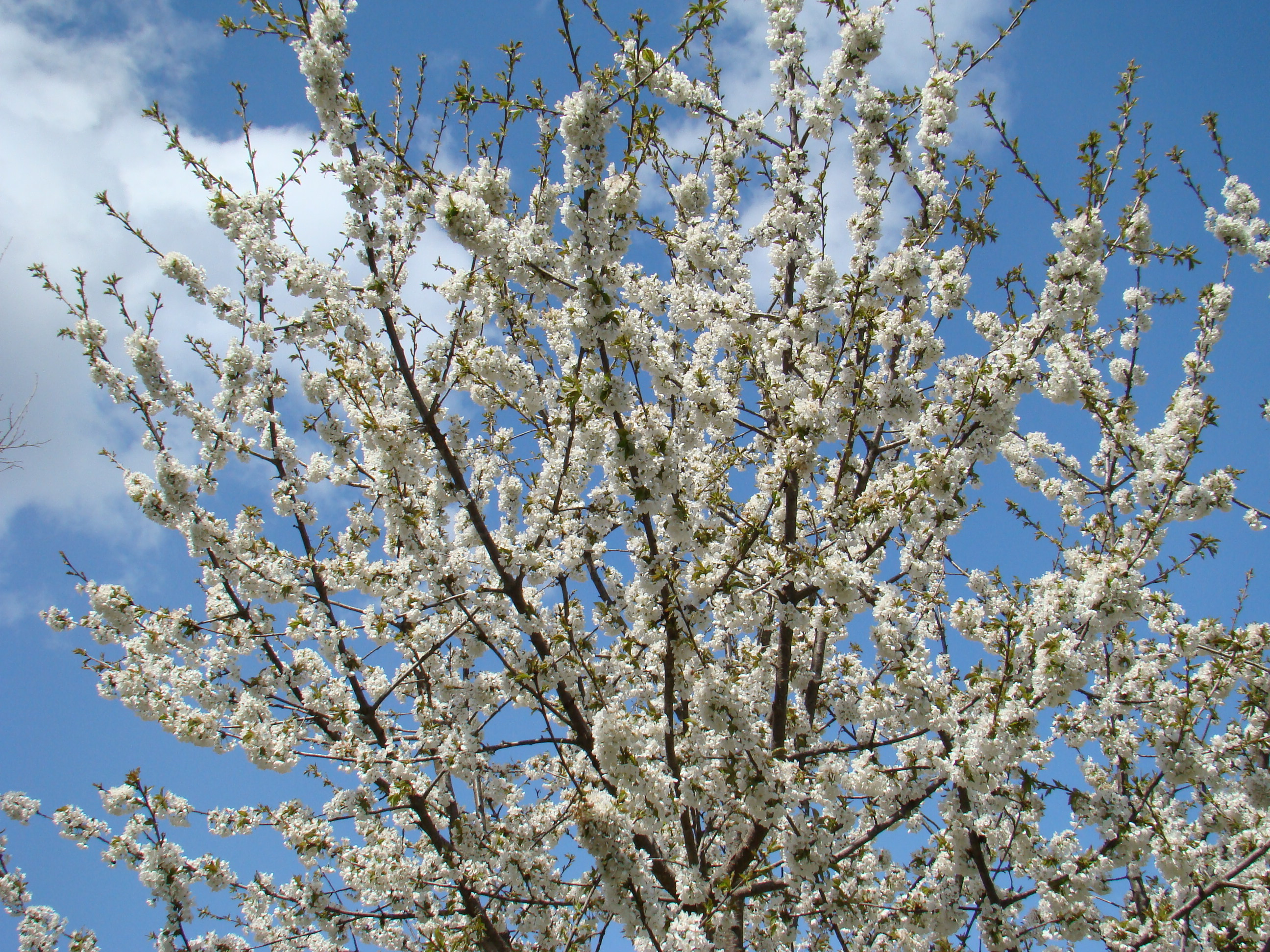
Cherry tree

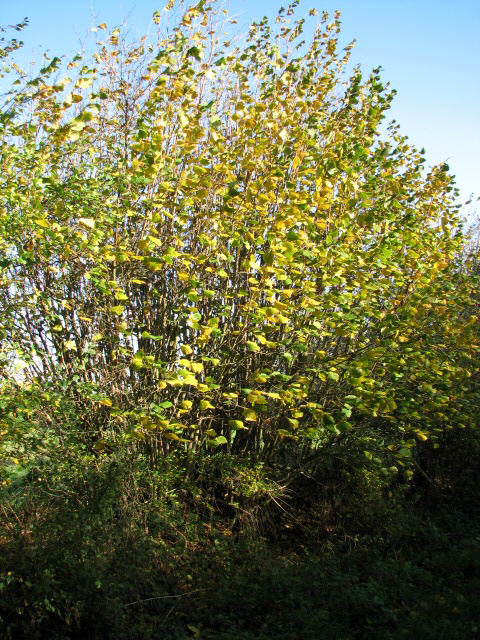
Hazel tree

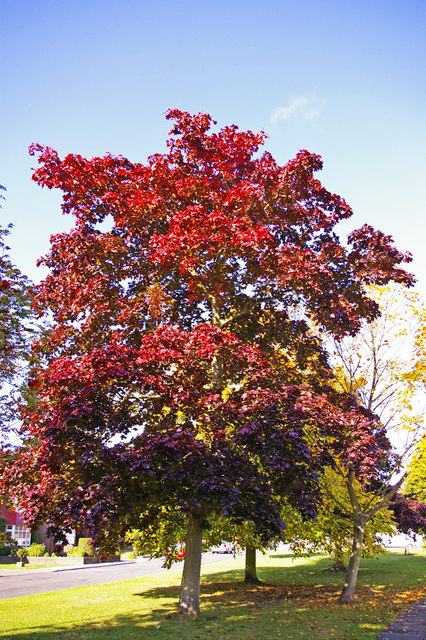
Maple tree

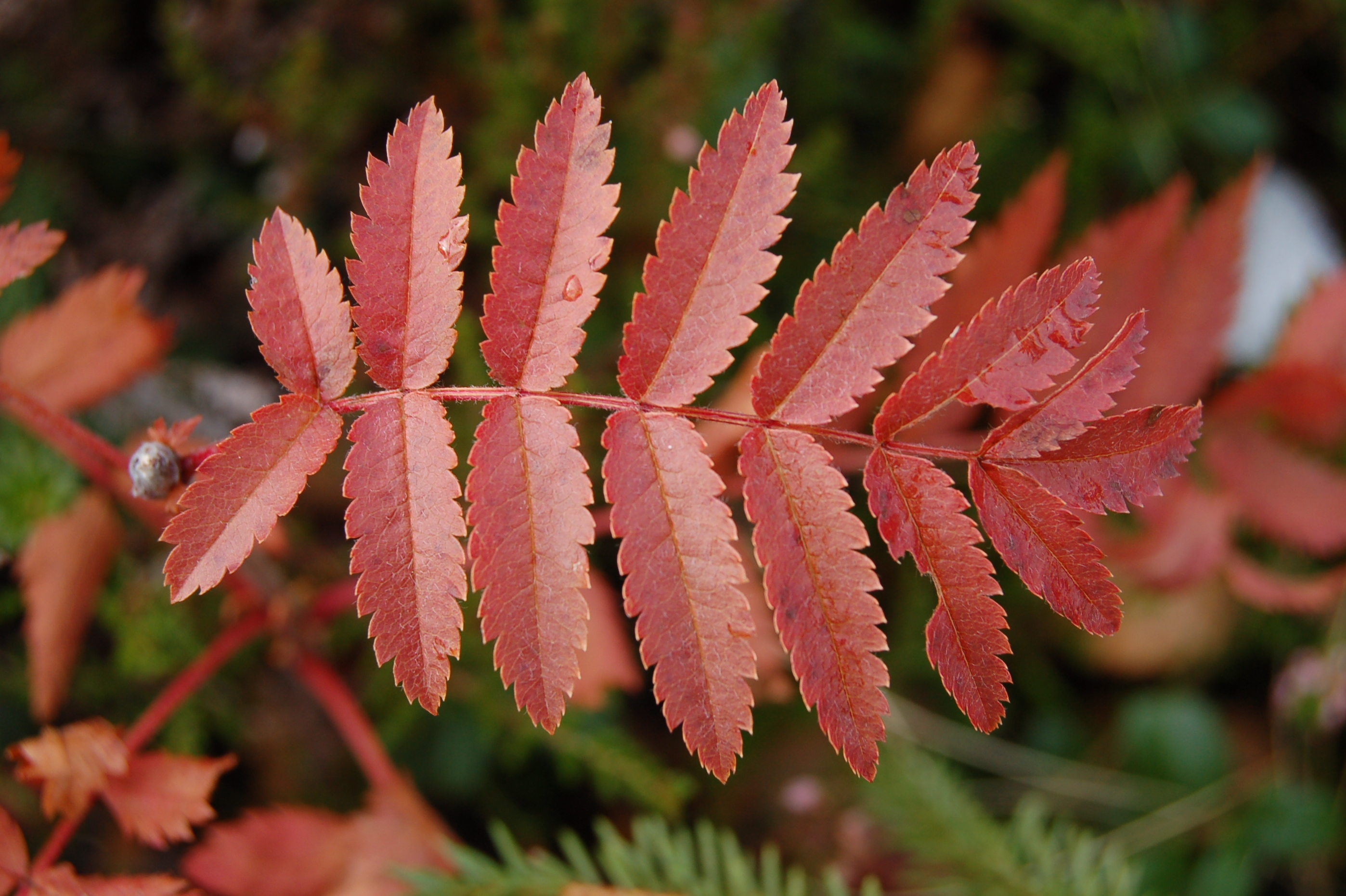
Sorbus aucuparia

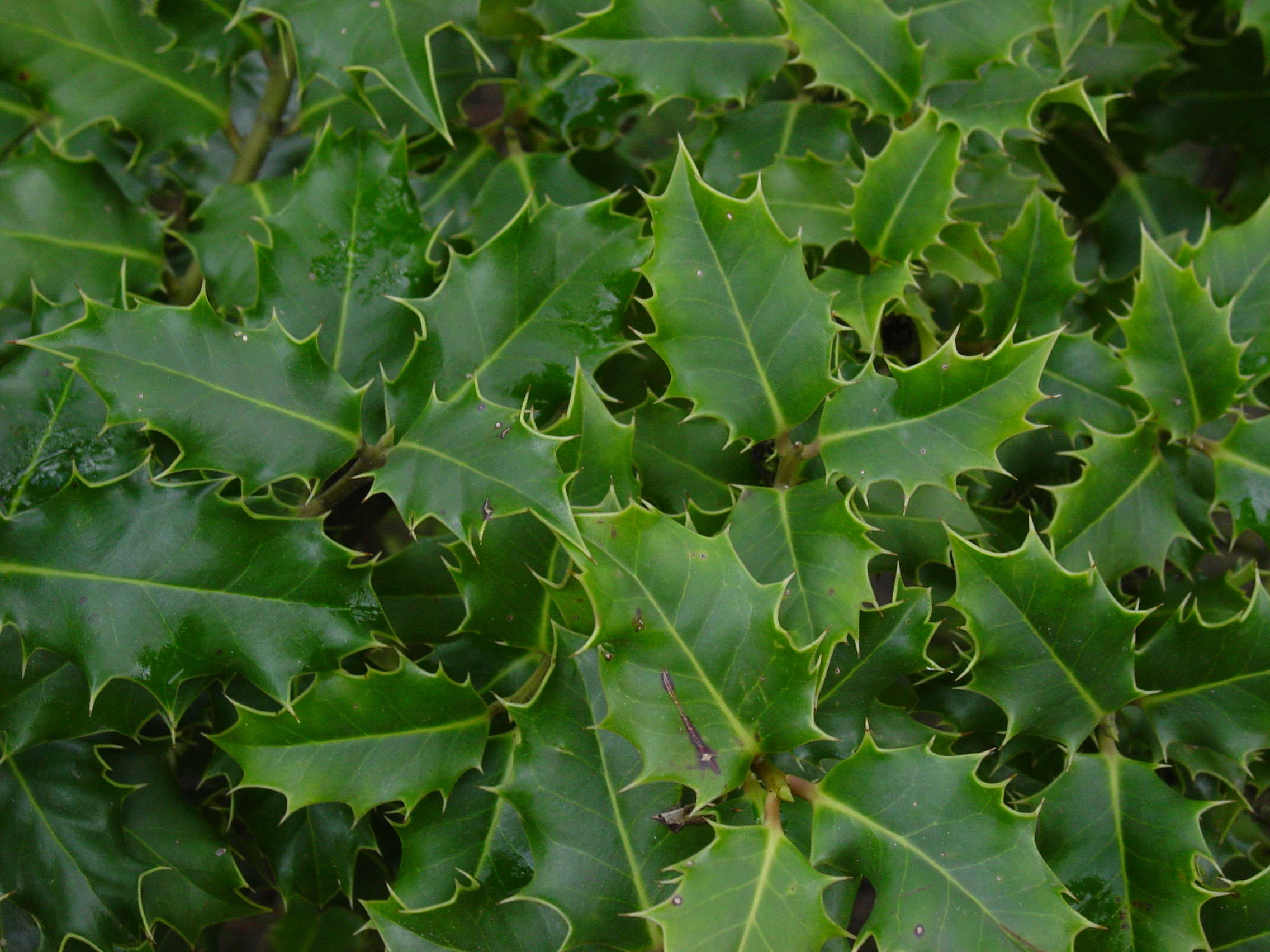
Holly

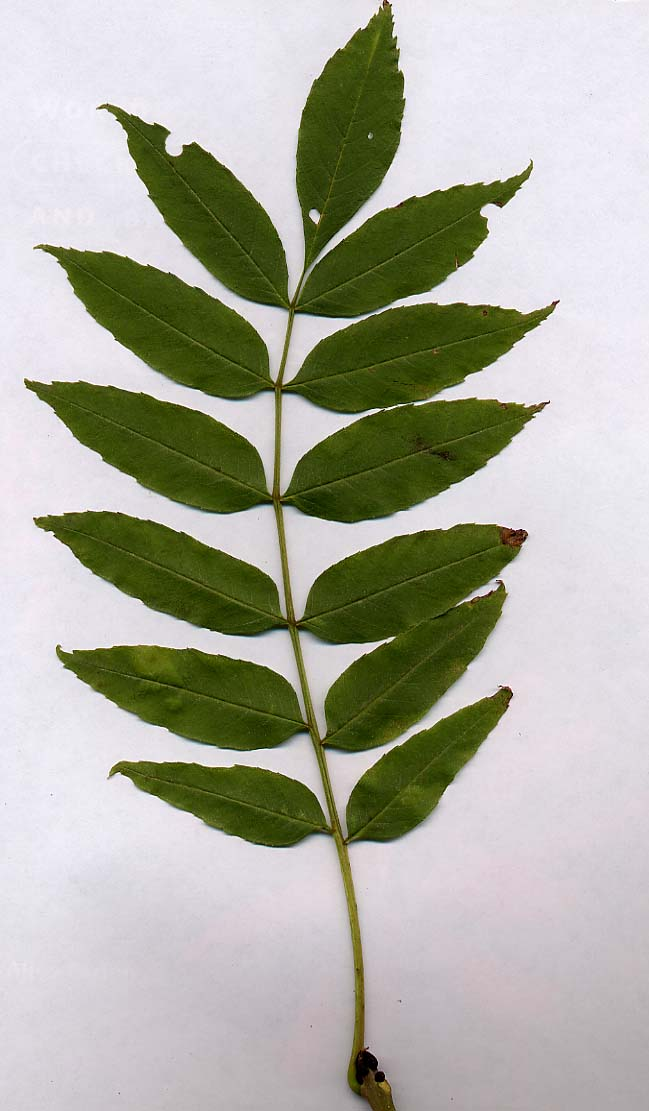
Ash leaf

== Places of historical interest ==
The village of Armentia was the most important religious centre in the Middle Ages. Since it was the see of the Bishop, the cathedral of Armentia was the only cathedral in the Basque Country until the 11th century. Armentia was placed at a strategic point at that time. On the one hand it stood on the route of the El Camino de Santiago and on the other hand, it stood on the Roman roads.

=== Basilica of San Prudencio ===
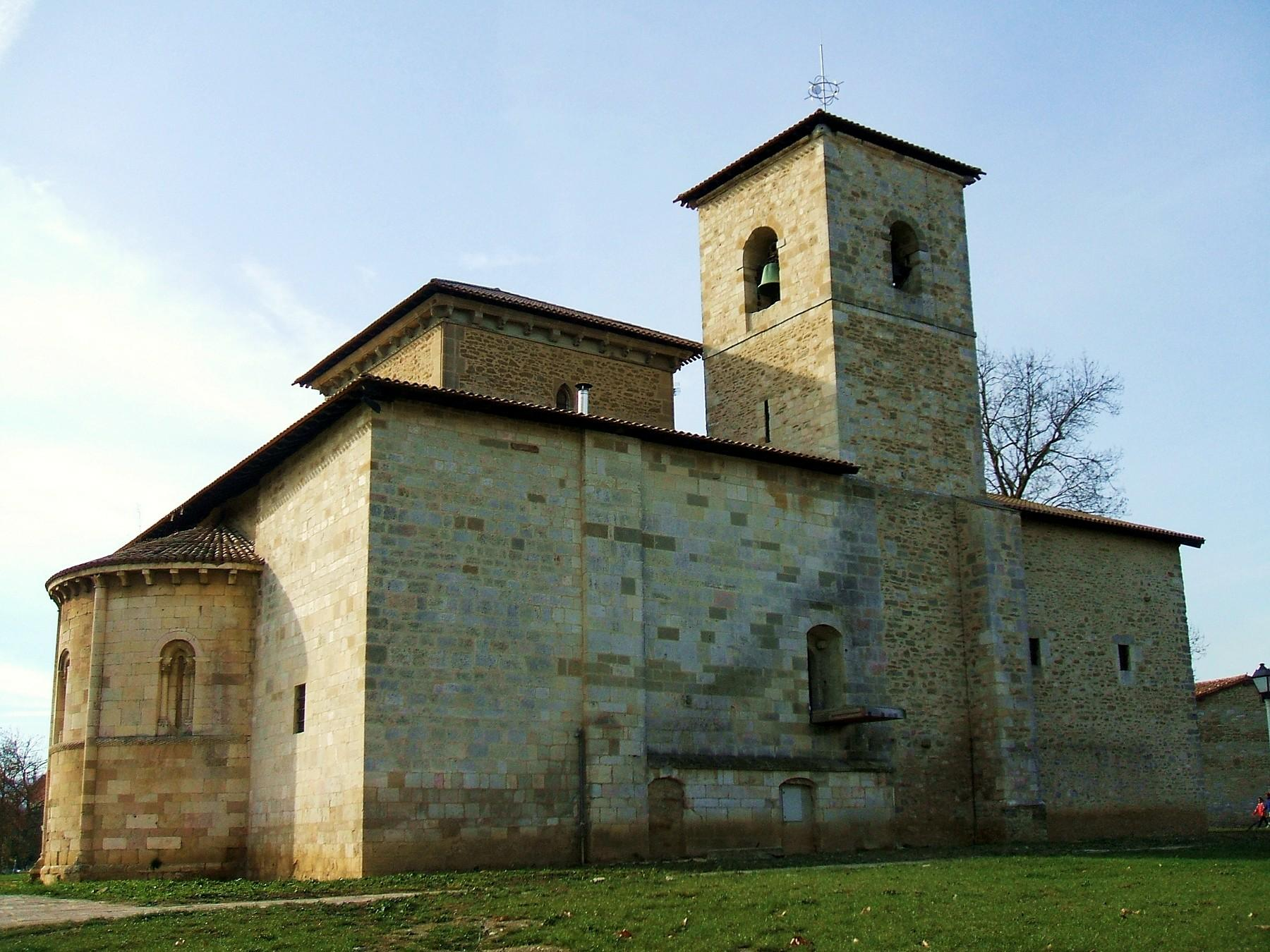
A panoramic of the Basilica of Armentia.

The Basilica of San Prudencio is a small church set on a terrace at the entrance of the forest. It dates from the 12th century, possibly at the same time as the birth of Vitoria, and it was built in a Romanesque style. Originally this building was dedicated to Saint Andrew, and reconstructed from the remains of an 8th-century. It underwent a refurbishment, and parts of the inner structure were modified, though it retained its apse and other isolated elements such as its original door.

The church was built with a Latin cross layout; the vaults over the apse and crossing of its two arms are of special interest. The bases of the arches of the second of these vaults contain sculptures of the evangelists. The capitals of the church are decorated with plant and animal motifs, as well as war scenes between landers and centaurs. The atrium maintains some of the remains of the original doorway. After being dismantled, stones from the doorway were embedded in the walls in a disorderly fashion: the tympanum of the Lamb and that of Christ with the Apostles and the bas-reliefs of the Descent of Christ into Hell and the Sepulchre of Jesus, represent one of the best Romanesque sculptural groups in the Basque Country.

== Further projects ==
Armentia is part of the Green Belt of Vitoria-Gasteiz, together with Salburua, Olarizu, Alegria, Zabalgana, Errekaleor and Zadorra.

=== The last two decades ===
Due to the numerous fires and erosions of land in the forest, the park of Armentia experienced a very precarious state of conservation. The Provincial Council of Alava decided to restore and to renew the forest, introducing new species of plants, in order to improve the park. The maples, rowan trees, cypresses and many other species date from that period.

In the 1990s, the forest went through several bonfires and degradation because of accumulation of rubbish, excessive number of pathways and tracks and numerous eroded and flooded areas.

After joining up the Green Belt, the first work consisted of restructuring the network of paths, improving the main tracks and closing the smaller ones, and the creation of a network of pathways for pedestrians, cyclists and horse riders. The areas where the degradation had left marks were considerably restored (acondicionamiento literally means conditioned), by introducing car parks on the entrances to the park. Finally, two main sitting places were created.

== See also ==
- Vitoria-Gasteiz
- Basílica de San Prudencio de Armentia
- Salburua
