= Lac de Saint-Pée-sur-Nivelle =

Lake in Pyrénées-Atlantiques, France

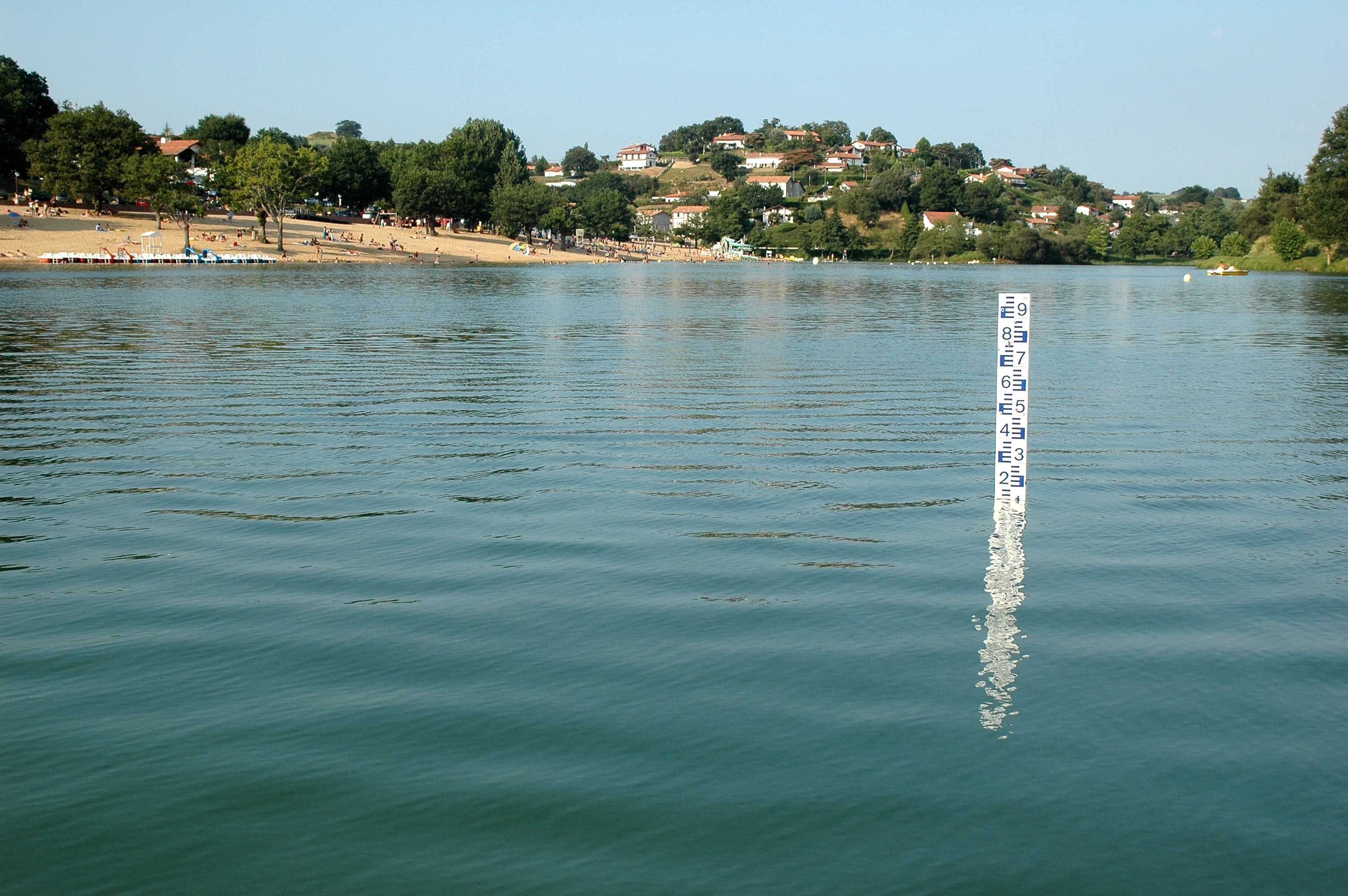

- Location within Pyrenees
- Location: Saint-Pée-sur-Nivelle, Pyrénées-Atlantiques
- Coordinates: 43°20′48″N 1°31′15″W
- Basin countries: France
- Surface area: 0.12 km^{2} (0.046 sq mi)

Lac de Saint-Pée-sur-Nivelle (Occitan: Lac de Sent Pèr de Nivèla; Basque: Don Pe Nibelan aintzira) is a lake located in Pyrénées-Atlantiques, Nouvelle-Aquitaine, France. Its surface area is 0.12 km².
