= Uzkiano =

Village in Álava, Spain

- Concejo
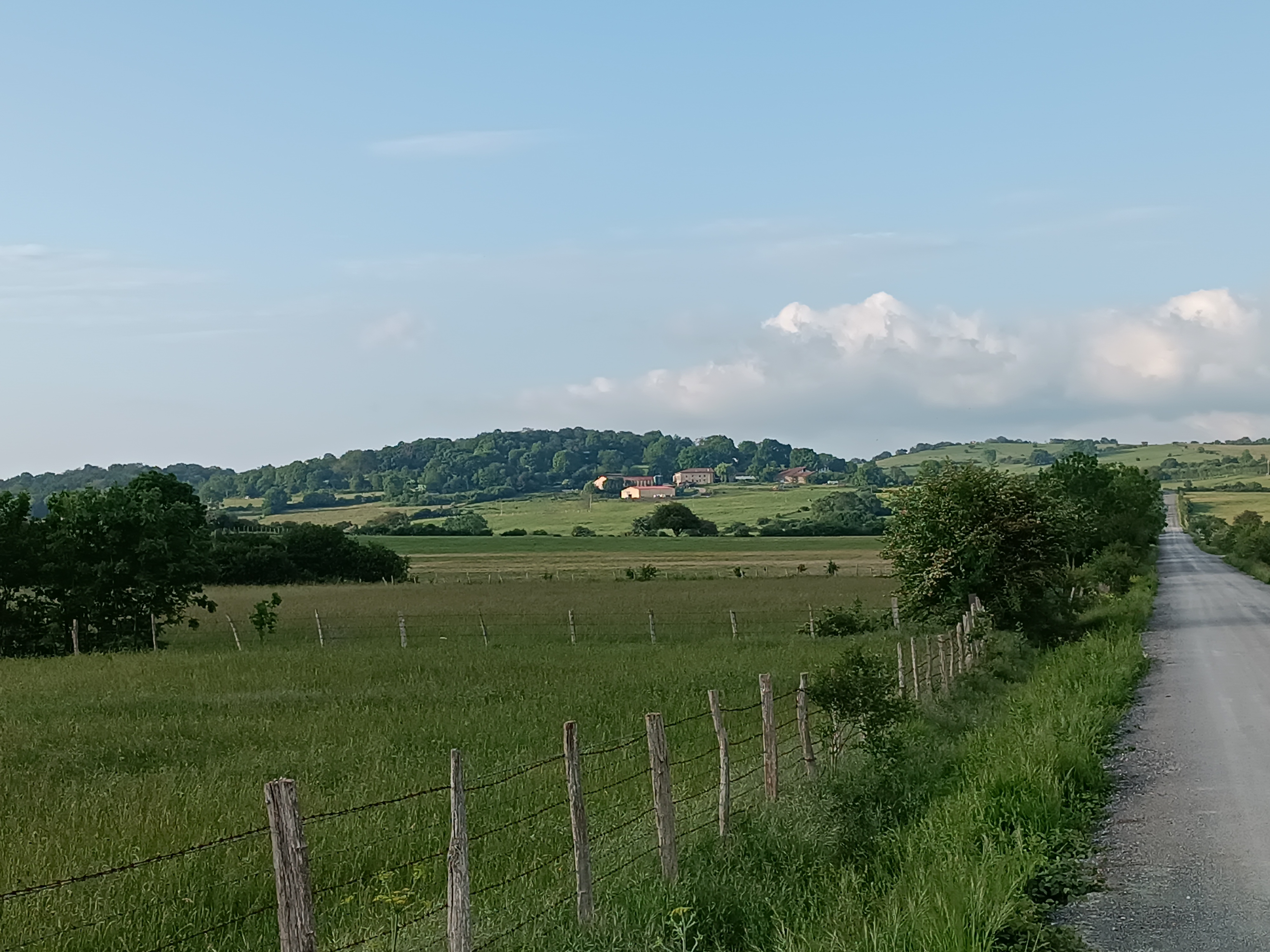

- Location within Álava Location within the Basque Country Location within Spain
- Coordinates: 42°59′50″N 2°56′32″W
- Country: Spain
- Autonomous community: Basque Country
- Province: Álava
- Comarca: Gorbeialdea
- Municipality: Urkabustaiz
- Elevation: 691 m (2,267 ft)

Population (2023)
  - Total: 21
- Postal code: 01449

Uzkiano (Spanish: Uzquiano) is a hamlet and concejo in the municipality of Urkabustaiz, Álava province, Basque Country, Spain. There is a church dedicated to Saint Michael.
