= Saint-Pée-sur-Nivelle =

Saint-Pée-sur-Nivelle Senpere (Basque)
- Commune
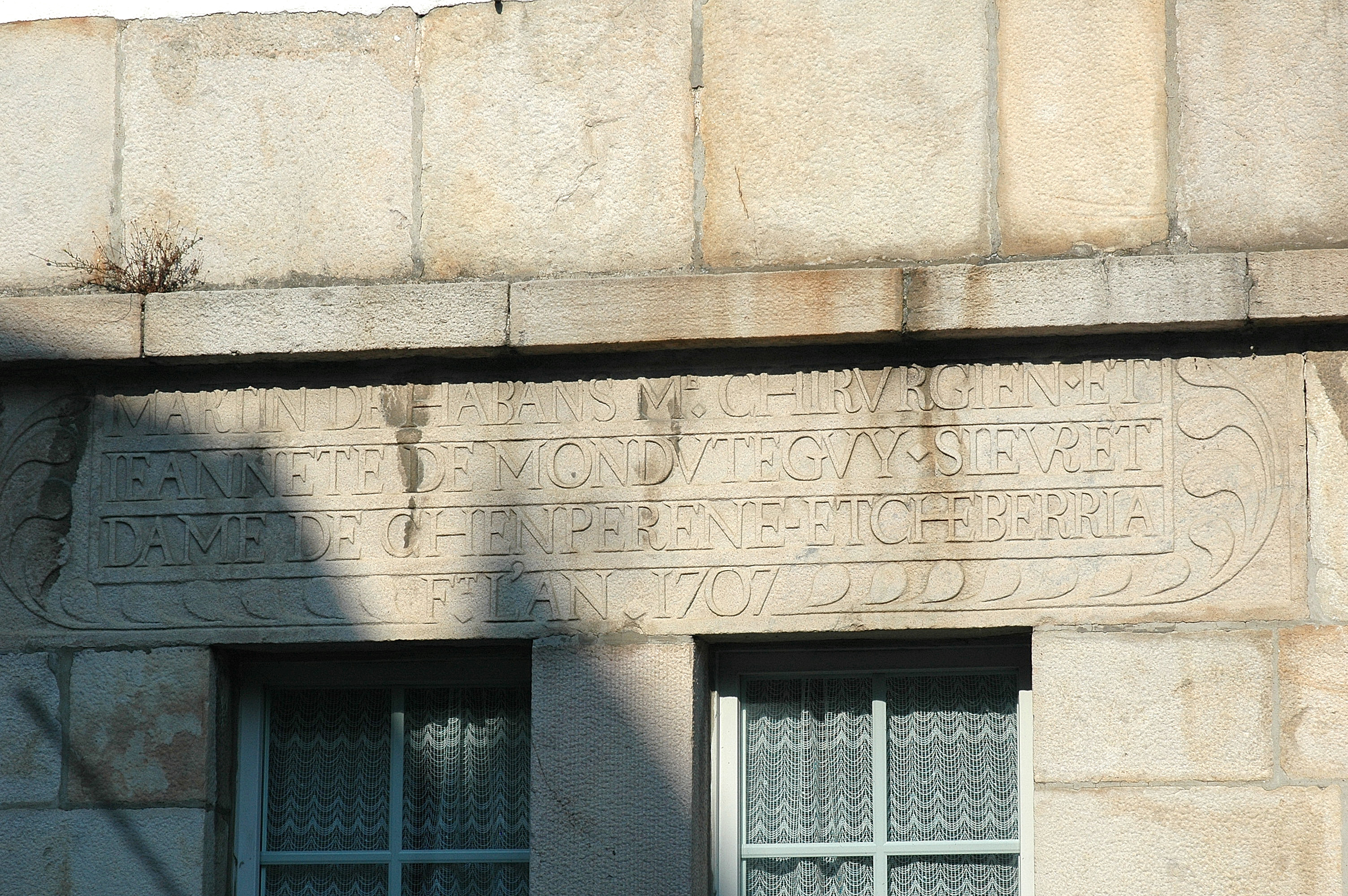
- Atalburu

- Coat of arms
- Location of Saint-Pée-sur-Nivelle
- Location within France Location within Nouvelle-Aquitaine
- Coordinates: 43°21′27″N 1°32′58″W
- Country: France
- Region: Nouvelle-Aquitaine
- Department: Pyrénées-Atlantiques
- Arrondissement: Bayonne
- Canton: Ustaritz-Vallées de Nive et Nivelle
- Intercommunality: CA Pays Basque

Government
  - Mayor (2023–2026): Bernard Elhorga
- Area^{1}: 65 km^{2} (25 sq mi)
- Elevation: 20 m (66 ft)
- Highest elevation: 227 m (745 ft)
- Lowest elevation: 10 m (33 ft)
- Population (2023): 7,264
  - Density: 110/km^{2} (290/sq mi)
- Time zone: UTC+01:00 (CET)
  - Summer (DST): UTC+02:00 (CEST)
- INSEE/Postal code: 64495 /64310
- ^{1} French Land Register data, which excludes lakes, ponds, glaciers > 1 km^{2} (0.386 sq mi or 247 acres) and river estuaries.

Saint-Pée-sur-Nivelle (French pronunciation: [sɛ̃ pe syʁ nivɛl], literally Saint Peter on Nivelle; Basque: Senpere; Occitan: Sent Pèr de Nivèla) is a village and a commune in the Pyrénées-Atlantiques department in southwestern France. It is part of the traditional Basque province of Labourd.

The village is scattered in several neighbourhoods, with the main nucleus located at a crossroads. As its name in French conveys, the village is located on the river Nivelle.

The village is renowned for the "Herri Urrats" festival in support of the Basque-language schools (ikastolak) held in May on a yearly basis at the Lake of Senpere since the early 1980s. Tens of thousands of people turn out. It is located in the Arrondissement of Bayonne.

== Population ==
Historical population
Year	Pop.	±% p.a.
1968	2,422	—
1975	2,567	+0.83%
1982	3,056	+2.52%
1990	3,463	+1.58%
1999	4,331	+2.52%
2007	5,251	+2.44%
2012	5,954	+2.54%
2017	6,849	+2.84%
2023	7,264	+0.99%
Source: INSEE

== See also ==
- Communes of the Pyrénées-Atlantiques department
