= Urkabustaiz =

Urkabustaiz Urcabustaiz
- Municipality
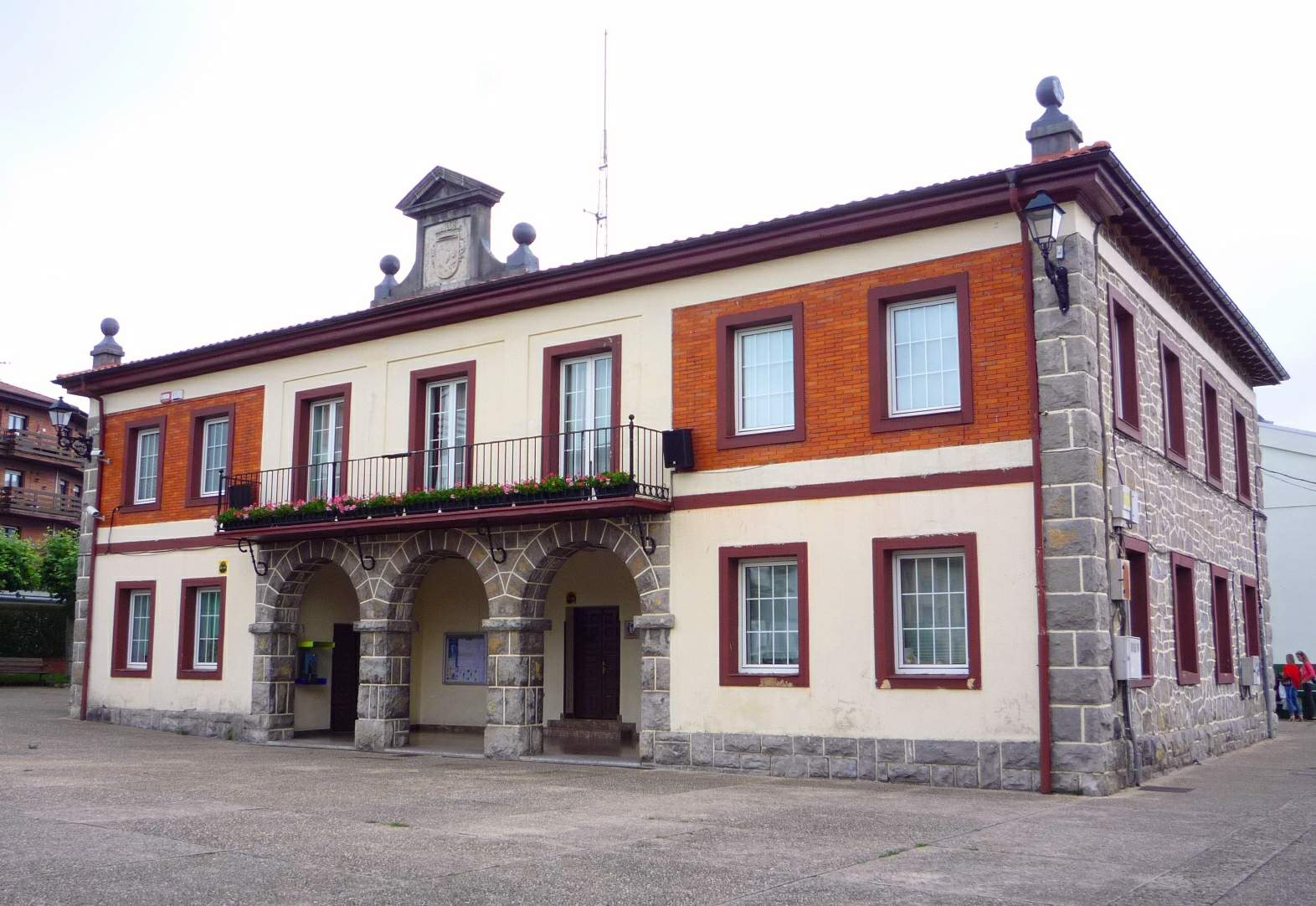
- Town hall of Urkabustaiz in Izarra

- Coat of arms

- Location of Urkabustaiz in the Basque Country Urkabustaiz (the Basque Country) Urkabustaiz (Spain)
- Coordinates: 42°58′19″N 2°55′20″W
- Country: Spain
- Autonomous community: Basque Country
- Province: Araba/Álava
- Eskualdea / Comarca: Gorbeialdea

Government
  - Mayor: Jose Antonio Lopez Goitia

Area
  - Total: 60.49 km^{2} (23.36 sq mi)
- Elevation: 633 m (2,077 ft)

Population (2025-01-01)
  - Total: 1,470
  - Density: 24.3/km^{2} (62.9/sq mi)
- Postal code: 01440

Urkabustaiz (Spanish: Urcabustaiz) is a municipality located in the province of Araba (Álava), in the Basque Country, northern Spain. Its capital is the town of Izarra.

== Councils ==
The municipality consists of 12 towns governed by 10 administrative boards. As of 2018, their populations are as follows:

Name		Population
Spanish	Basque	Population
Abecia	Abezia	41
Abornicano	Abornikano	60
Belunza	Beluntza	35
Gujuli-Ondona: Gujuli; Ondona	Goiuri-Ondona: Goiuri; Ondona	61
Inoso	Inoso	26
Izarra	Izarra	986
Larrazcueta	Larrazkueta	14
Oyardo	Oiardo	36
Unzá-Apreguíndana: Apreguíndana; Unzá	Untzaga-Apregindana: Apreguíndana; Unzá	58
Uzquiano	Uzkiano	20
