= Nivelle (river) =

River in Spain

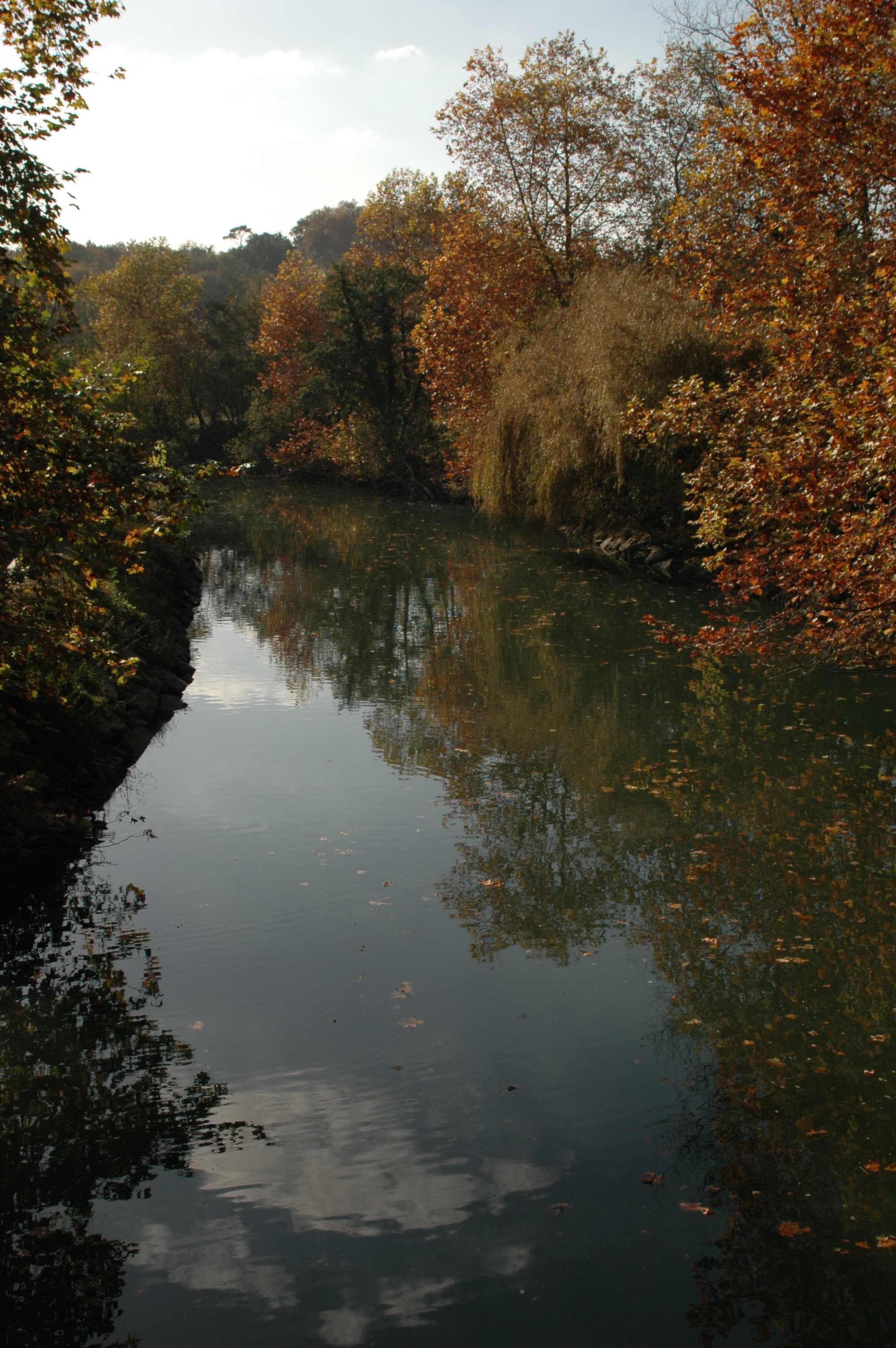
- Nivelle at Ascain

- Location within France Location within Nouvelle-Aquitaine
- Native name: La Nivelle (French); Urdazuri (Basque)

Location
- Countries: Spain and France

Physical characteristics
- Source
  - location: Western Pyrenees
  - elevation: 520 m (1,710 ft)
- Mouth
  - location: Bay of Biscay
  - coordinates: 43°23′15″N 1°40′9″W
- Length: 39 km (24 mi)
- Basin size: 233 km^{2} (90 sq mi)
- Discharge
  - average: 5 m^{3}/s (180 cu ft/s) (measured at Saint-Pée-sur-Nivelle)

The Nivelle (French pronunciation: [nivɛl]; Occitan: Nivèl; widest accepted Basque forms: Ugarana or Urdazuri) is a 39-kilometre (24 mi) long river French department of the Pyrénées-Atlantiques (France) flowing largely south-east to north-west, with only 7 km of its length being considered navigable. The river results from the union of various streams in Urdazubi (Navarre), going on to cross the Spanish-French border at Dantxarinea after 14 kilometres (8.7 mi) meandering across Navarrese soil. The river pours into the Bay of Biscay on the bay of Saint-Jean-de-Luz (French for Donibane Lohizune) after cutting its way between this town and Ciboure (French for Ziburu) on its final stage. At this point, celebrated Basque French composer and arranger Maurice Ravel was born in one of the front houses overlooking the channel.

== Variety of Basque names ==
For all its shortness, the river takes on several names in Basque language at different stretches of the course, e.g. Sarrakaria, Urma, Uhertsi (spelled sometimes Ur Ertsi), besides the above Ugarana and Urdazuri. This conspicuous diversity reflects the historic situation of the native language, deprived of official recognition whatsoever or transmission through formal schooling up to recent times (and still). Locals, when asked for the name of the river in Basque, often may answer U(r)handi, meaning "big water", a descriptive naming that has sometimes applied to the neighbouring and main river of Labourd the Errobi/Nive.

== Troubled waters ==
The geographical situation of the basin makes its climate mild (average temperature 14 °C) under the influence of humid air masses blowing from the sea. Yet the clash between these air currents and the Pyrenean region spurs sudden showers frequently (average annual rainfall on the watershed 2,000 mm). On May 4, 2007, like in 1983, the banks of the river go through dire consequences on account of floods (170 mm pour down in 24 hours at Saint-Pée-sur-Nivelle). Many in the village and the whole basin were subject to extensive damage and injuries, including the facilities and equipment of the touristy caves of Urdazubi/Urdax. Echoing a long-running claim of the inhabitants, the dam Lurberria was built in 2008 to contain swollen waters.

== Fishing and river fauna ==
Brown trout is well entrenched in the river, especially in its upstream tributaries (more than 90 brooks). In contrast, salmon, trout and shad stick to the lower stretch of the Nivelle, where they fall prey to fishers. Actually, since the 1990s a noticeable fail to achieve the upstream spawning areas has been detected in the salmon population, i.e. 470 individuals in 1993 vs 88 in 2003 (checked at Saint-Pée-sur-Nivelle), the fish remaining largely in the estuary where they are subject to fishing activity. This erratic behaviour has been put down to rising water temperature and climate change. Actually, the threshold of the 12 °C was topped 60% of the days from 2000 to 2002.

== See also ==
- Battle of Nivelle
