= Herri Urrats =

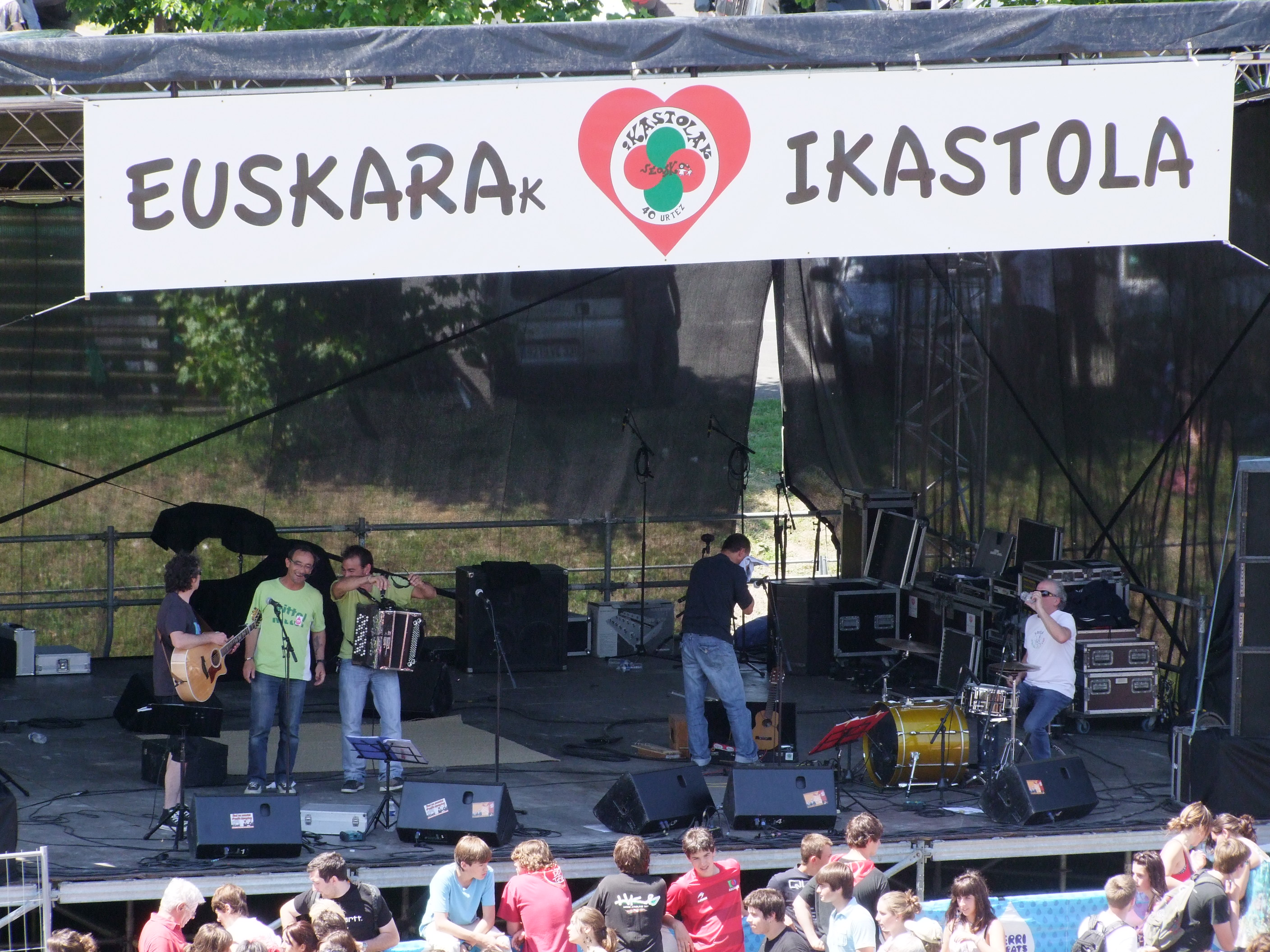
- Herri Urrats festival held in 2011
- Genre: Basque culture
- Date: Second Sunday of May
- Frequency: Annual
- Locations: Saint-Pée-sur-Nivelle, Northern Basque Country, France
- Years active: 1984-present
- Inaugurated: 1984
- Website: www.herriurrats.eus

Herri Urrats (Basque for 'a people's step') is an annual festival held the second Sunday of May to reach out to the ikastolak ('Basque language schools') in the Northern Basque Country, France. In the Southern Basque Country (Spain), Basque is taught in all public schools, but in the French Basque Country, students wishing to be taught in Basque must attend an ikastola school.

== History ==
The first festival was held in 1984 in the town of Saint-Pée-sur-Nivelle (Senpere in Basque) on the banks of the Lac de Sain-Pée . The small town has come to be renowned for its regular Herri Urrats celebration, which remains one of the largest of its kind. Herri Urrats consists basically of a walk around the Saint-Pée lake. The circuit laid out around an artificial lake is dotted with food stands and entertainment all along. Walkers sometimes march in support of an organization.

Its first edition was attended by five thousand people, but in later years the attendance has risen as high as seventy thousand. In 2011, the money collected was used to fund the Kanbo Xalbador Ikastola. The funds collected provide financial support to the Basque schools across the three traditional provinces of Iparralde (French Basque Country): Lapurdi, Lower Navarre and Zuberoa. Contributions of participants and popular subscription have helped build twenty-five ikastolas, three primary schools, and one secondary school. The festival also celebrates Basque culture and language.

== World celebration ==
Herri Urrats is celebrated in many major cities the world over, including Buenos Aires, Argentina, Paris and London.
