= Izarra, Álava =

Village in Álava, Spain

Izarra
- Concejo
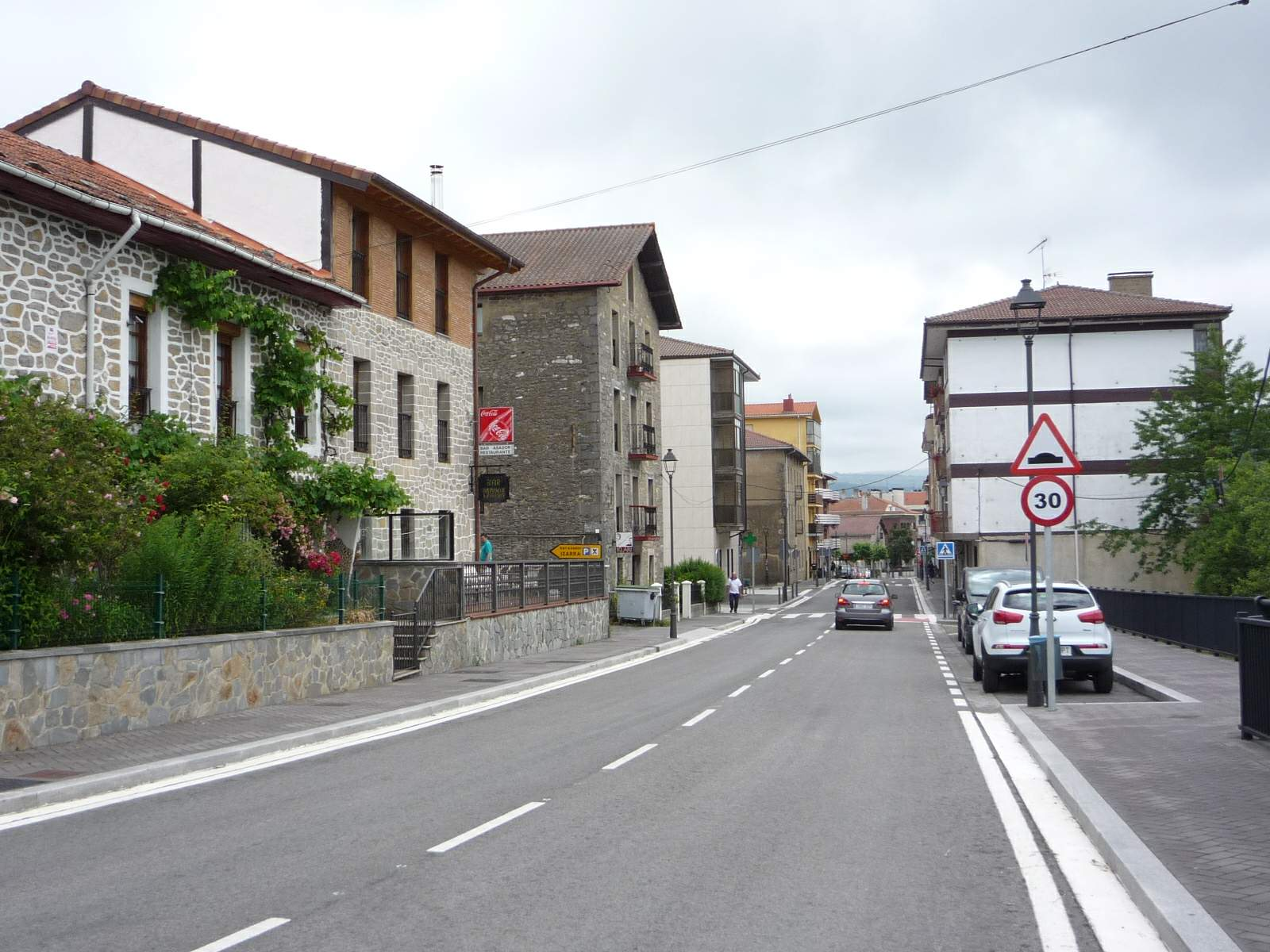

- Location within Álava Location within the Basque Country Location within Spain
- Coordinates: 42°57′N 2°54′W
- Country: Spain
- Autonomous community: Basque Country
- Province: Álava
- Comarca: Gorbeialdea
- Municipality: Urkabustaiz

Area
  - Total: 4.46 km^{2} (1.72 sq mi)
- Elevation: 634 m (2,080 ft)

Population (2022)
  - Total: 1,058
  - Density: 237/km^{2} (614/sq mi)
- Postal code: 01440

Izarra is a village and concejo in the municipality of Urkabustaiz, in Álava province, Basque Country, Spain. It is the capital of the municipality.
