= Olárizu =

Coordinates: 42°49′32″N 2°39′38″W

Olárizu is the name of a meadow area and hill in the province of Álava, Spain, in the outskirts of Vitoria-Gasteiz. The name was given originally to a now deserted village in the fourteenth century.

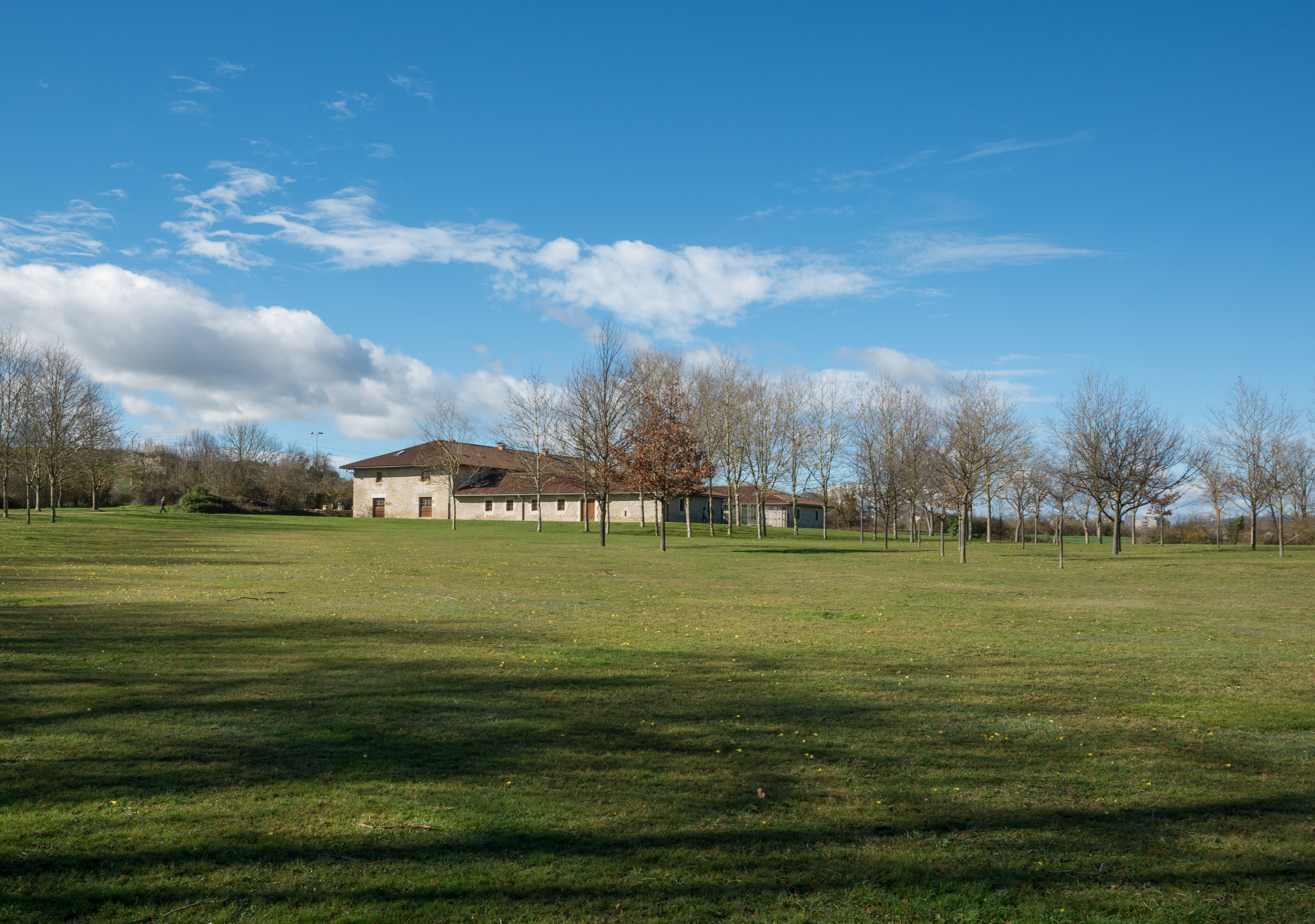
Olarizu meadows

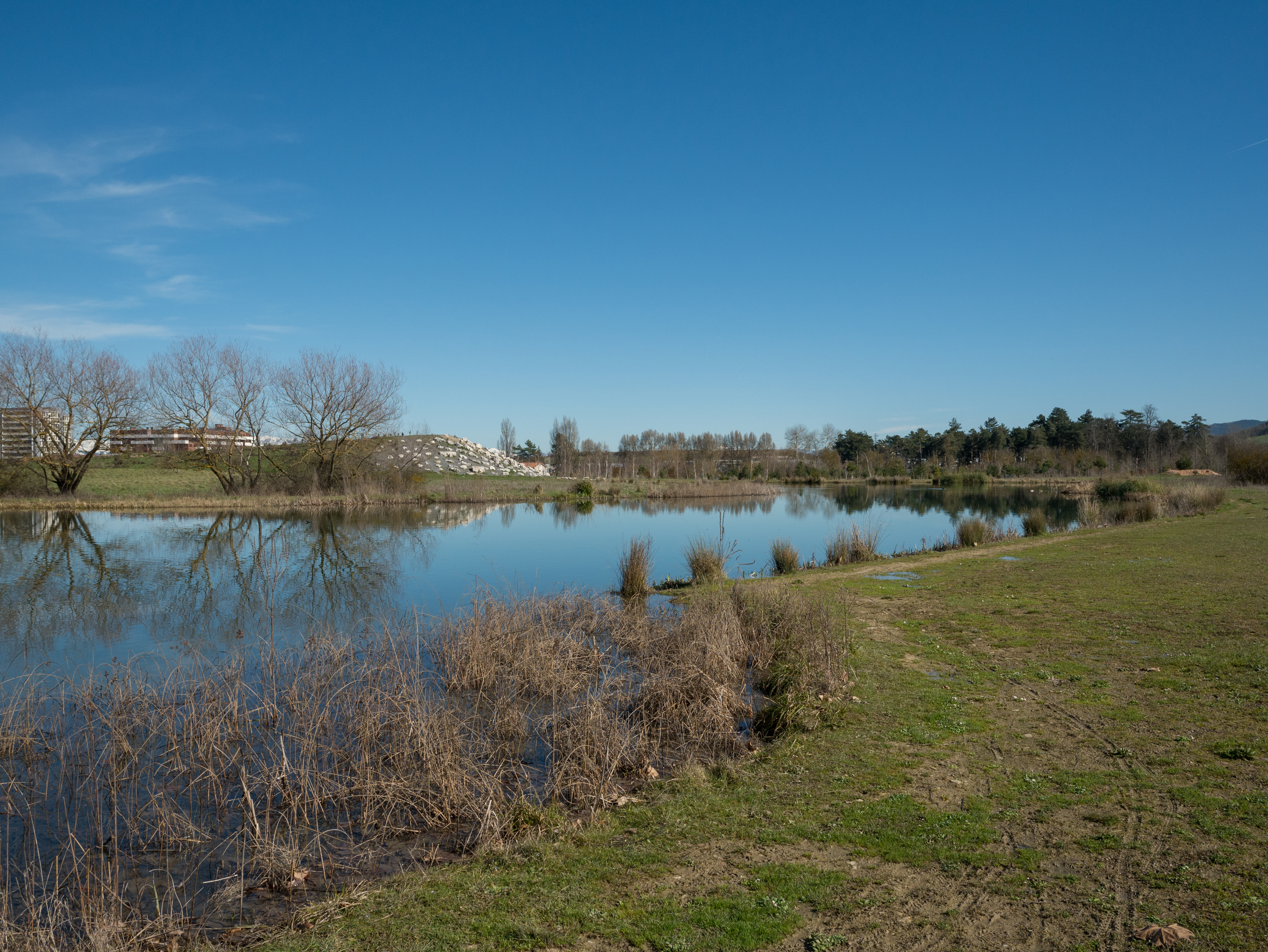
Olarizu Lake

Since the nineteenth century, its fields have become popular as part of a procession and festivity to honor the Virgin on the Monday after September 8.
