= 1962 in association football =

The following are the football (soccer) events of the year 1962 throughout the world.

== Events ==
- Copa Libertadores 1962: Won by Santos FC after defeating Peñarol on an aggregate score of 3–0.
- 1962 International Soccer League
  - League: America-RJ defeated Belenenses 3–1 on aggregate.
  - Cup: Dukla Prague defeated America-RJ, 3–2, on aggregate.

== Winners club national championship ==
- Argentina: Club Atlético Boca Juniors
- Brazil: Santos
- Chile: Universidad de Chile
- England: Ipswich Town
- France: Stade de Reims
- Ireland: Shelbourne
- Italy: A.C. Milan
- Mexico: Chivas Guadalajara
- Netherlands: Feyenoord
- Northern Ireland: Linfield
- Paraguay: Olimpia Asunción
- Scotland: Dundee
- Spain: Real Madrid
- Sweden: IFK Norrköping
- Turkey: Galatasaray S.K.

== International tournaments ==
- African Cup of Nations in Ethiopia (14–21 January 1962)
  1. Ethiopia
  2. Egypt
  3. Tunisia
- 1962 British Home Championship (7 October 1961 – 11 April 1962)

Scotland

- FIFA World Cup in Chile (30 May – 17 June 1962)
  1. Brazil
  2. Czechoslovakia
  3. Chile
- 1962 Asian Games in Indonesia (25 August – 4 September 1962)
- (gold) India
- (silver) South Korea
- (bronze) Malaya

== Births ==
- 5 January – Aleksandr Podolyak, Russian club footballer
- 6 January – Mark Ellis, English club footballer
- 11 January – Farkhad Magametov, Uzbekistani international footballer
- 12 January – Alfred Schön, German footballer and manager
- 20 January – Thomas Deligiannis, retired Greek footballer
- 21 January – Gabriele Pin, Italian footballer and coach
- 23 January – Stephen Keshi, Nigerian international footballer (died 2016)
- 26 January – Marco Antonio Barrero, Bolivian international footballer
- 5 February – Felipe Peralta, Paraguayan international footballer
- 13 February – Héctor Morán, Uruguayan international footballer
- 9 March – Jan Furtok, Polish international footballer
- 16 March – Lars Larsson, Swedish international footballer and coach (died 2015)
- 30 March
  - Dariusz Raczyński, Polish footballer (died 2022)
  - Gary Stevens, English football player and manager
- 10 April – Hubert Thomann, retired Swiss footballer
- 13 April
  - Edivaldo, Brazilian footballer (died 1993)
  - Nelson Gutiérrez, Uruguayan footballer
- 26 April – Colin Anderson, English club footballer
- 28 May – Mats Johansson, retired Swedish footballer
- 4 June – Per Frimann, Danish footballer
- 6 June – Jonas Lind, Swedish former footballer
- 7 July – Bernardo Tapia, Spanish retired footballer
- 14 July – Patricio Toledo, Chilean international footballer
- 17 July – Patricio Mardones, Chilean footballer
- 18 August – Hólger Quiñónez, Ecuadorian footballer
- 1 September
  - Tony Cascarino, Irish footballer
  - Ruud Gullit, Dutch international footballer and manager
- 6 September – Holger Fach, German international footballer and manager
- 10 September – Wiljan Vloet, Dutch football manager
- 17 September – Luis Caballero, Paraguayan international footballer (died 2005)
- 30 September – Frank Rijkaard, Dutch international footballer and manager
- 1 October – Attaphol Buspakom, Thai international footballer and coach (died 2015)
- 5 October – David Boulter, English retired professional footballer
- 26 October – Wilbert Suvrijn, Dutch international footballer
- 30 October – Stefan Kuntz, German international footballer
- 12 November – Wim Kieft, Dutch international footballer
- 15 November – Kim Vilfort, Danish international footballer
- 20 November
  - Paul Birch, English club footballer (died 2009)
  - Chris Foy, English referee
  - Gerardo Martino, Argentine football player and coach
- 23 November – Rob Vincent, English former professional footballer
- 3 December – Mark McNeil, English former professional footballer
- 8 December – Berry van Aerle, Dutch international footballer
- 10 December – John de Wolf, Dutch footballer

== Deaths ==
- 28 March – David Wijnveldt, Dutch international footballer (born 1891)
- 20 October – Jesús Herrera, Spanish international footballer (born 1938)
