= Armentia =

- Village
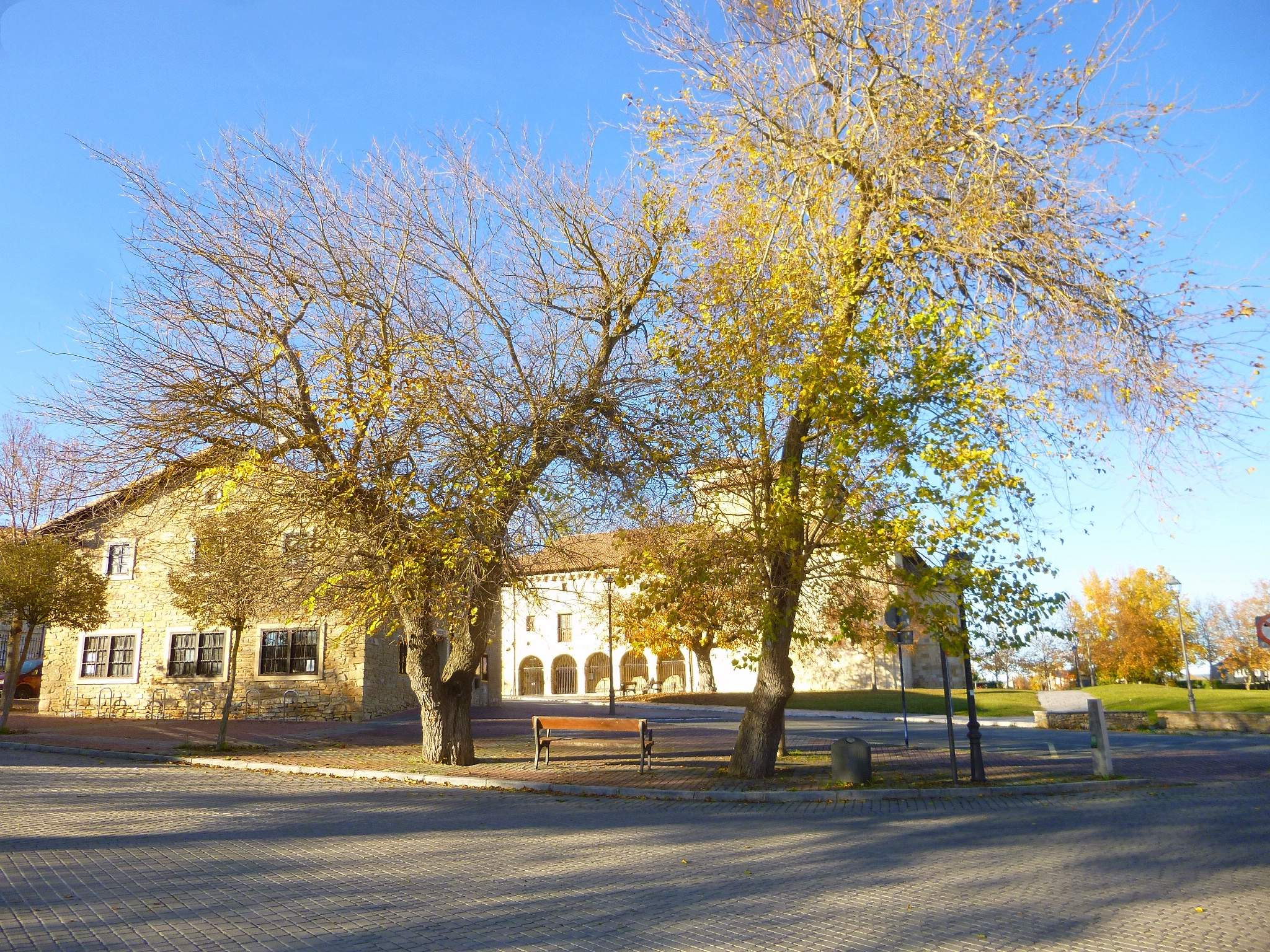

- Location in Spain
- Coordinates: 42°50′N 2°42′W
- Country: Spain
- Autonomous Community: Basque Country
- Province: Álava
- Comarca: Cuadrilla de Vitoria

Government
  - Alcalde: Gorka Urtaran (Basque Nationalist Party)
- Elevation (AMSL): 550 m (1,800 ft)

Population (2011)
  - Total: 215
- Time zone: UTC+1 (CET)
  - Summer (DST): UTC+2 (CEST)
- Postal code: 01007
- Area code: +34 (Spain) + 945 (Álava)
- Official language(s): Spanish, Basque

Armentia is one of the villages associated with Vitoria-Gasteiz. Its name comes from the Latin word armentum, which translated into English means "intensive farming". The village is well known for its 161 hectare park created in 1998. The northern boundary of the village is formed by the Ariznavarra neighborhood.

== Village ==
Armentia was a Spanish village in Álava, Basque Country and is at present one quarter of Vitoria-Gasteiz as a result of the city's expansion.

=== History ===
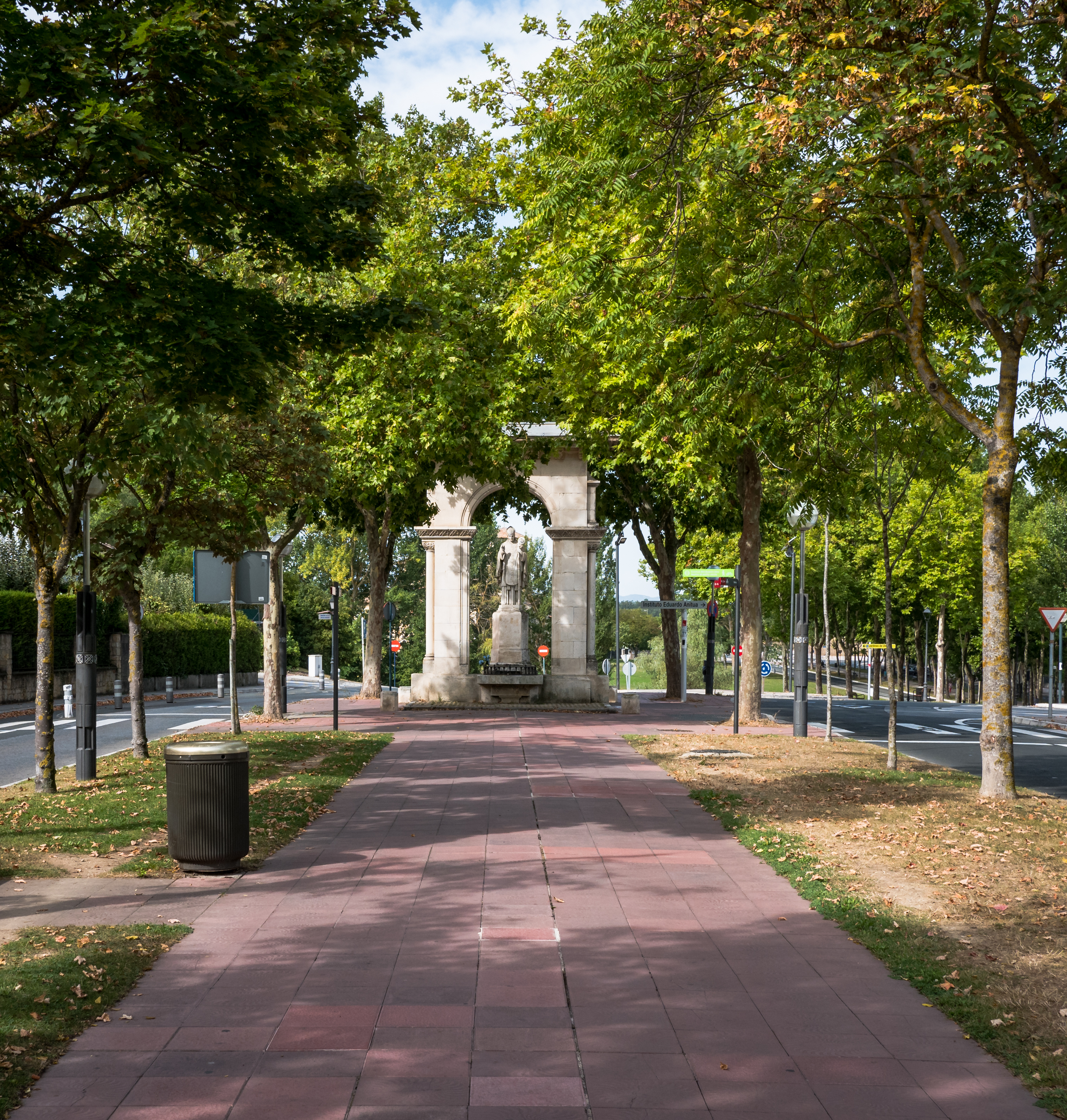
San Prudencio statue

The village of Armentia was the most important religious centre in Álava in the late Middle Ages and as it was the see of the bishop, its church was the first cathedral in the Basque Country until the end of the 11th century, a time when the southern part of the Iberian Peninsula was dominated by Muslim forces. Later, the bishop's see was moved to Calahorra. Now it is a titular see. Armentia was a strategic point on the communications networks in Roman and late medieval times and stood on the crossroads of two important routes: the Way of Saint James towards Gometxa, and the Roman road, which, after passing by the Mariturri Spring, headed towards Zuazo, and from there to Lermanda, Margarita and Iruña.

==== Basilica of San Prudencio ====
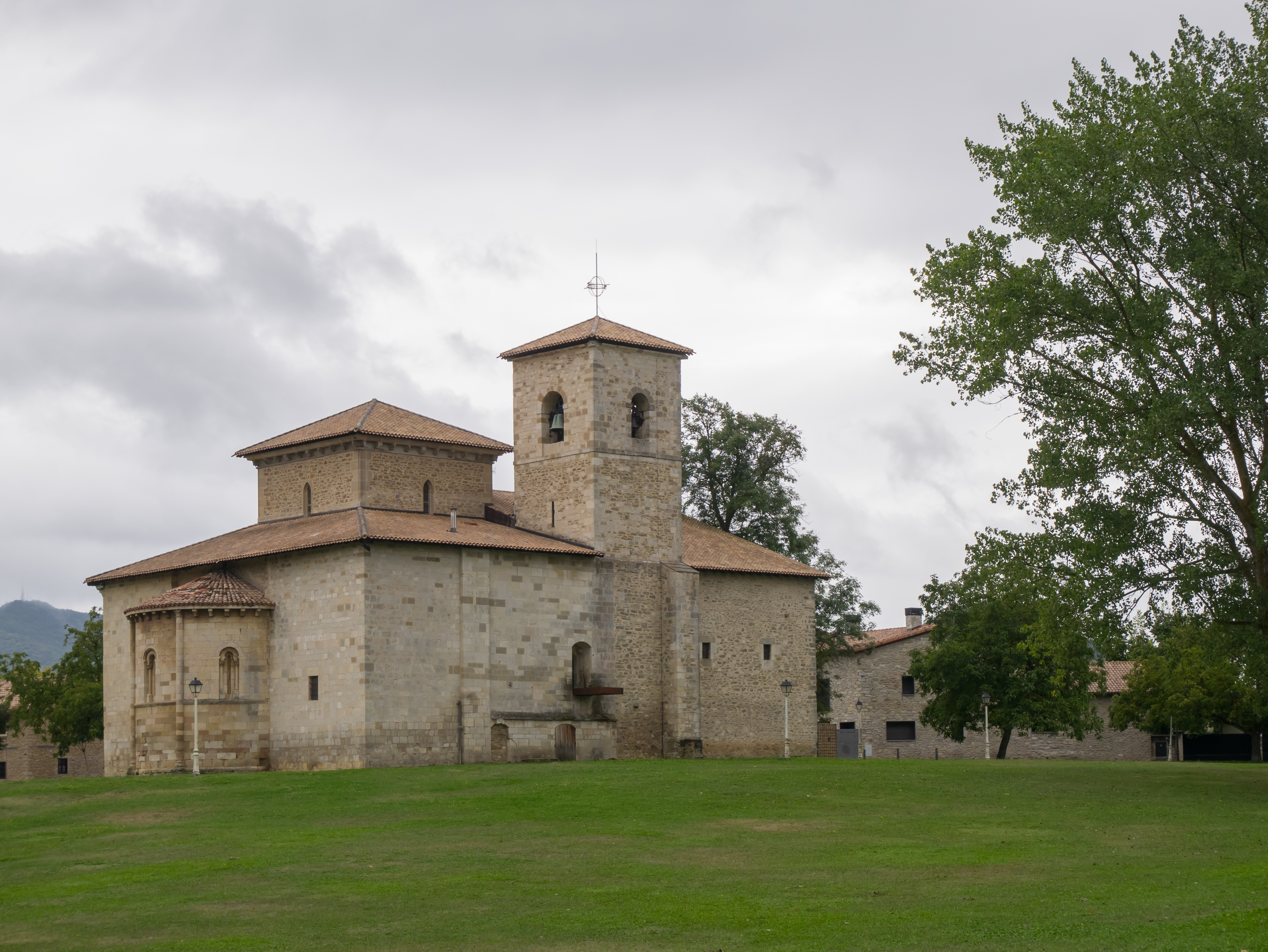
A panoramic of the Basilica of Armentia.

Armentia has one of the most important Romanesque churches dating from the 12th century in the province, which is the Basilica of San Prudencio de Armentia. References during the late Middle Ages describe it as the most important spiritual centre in Álava. The current building is twelfth century Romanesque and has a Latin cross plan, a transept and a semicircular apse.

=== Population ===
Evolution of the population in Armentia
2000	2001	2002	2003	2004	2005	2006	2007
215	221	222	217	225	222	213	227

== Park ==
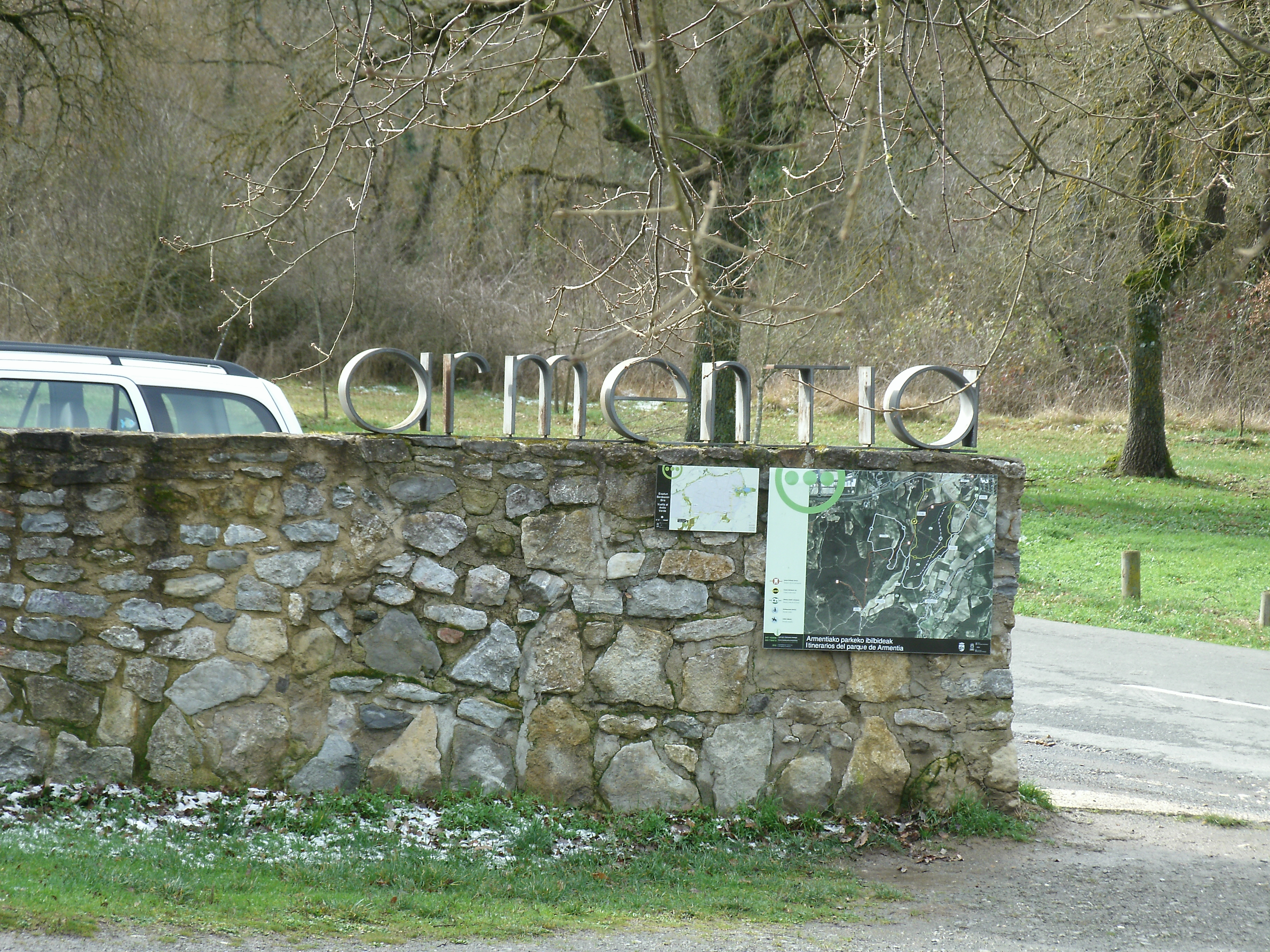
Armentia park gateway

Armentia park consists of a large natural gall-oak wood, located between the city and the Mountains of Vitoria, the main mountain system and one of the most valuable natural spaces in the municipality of Vitoria-Gasteiz. It is precisely its location that converts the forest of Armentia into a real biological corridor between forested areas, the green periurban areas and the urban ecosystem, and this constitutes the main value of Armentia park.

=== Flora and fauna ===
A major feature of the Armentia park is its extensive covering of natural woodland (104 ha), representing more than 70% of its surface area. The dominating species of the forest of Armentia is the gall oak. The park has grown over the last 25 years with the plantation of a wide variety of tree species, distributed over 40 ha of land formerly used for farming.

The forest of Armentia contains a number of different environments. There are areas of thick vegetation in which, in addition to gall oaks, there are maples, hawthorns, blackthorns and blackberry bushes, followed by areas of more scattered woodland with large clearings in some places, in which heather, badassi and juniper grow.

The Artetxo sitting area contains a number of mature gall oaks with an unusual candelabra-like shape, a consequence of pruning done over a number of years for firewood. On the ridges you can find beech, holly and rowan and along the edges of the small streams that flow through the park, maple, hazel and ash are very common.

The park is home to a variety fauna including wild boars, squirrels, birds of prey and about 30 species of small birds such as goldfinches, chaffinches, robins and great tits.

The environmental value of Armentia park consists of the fact that it is an ecological corridor between the green urban areas and the Mountains of Vitoria.

=== Development ===
The fires and excessive exploitation of the last two decades placed the forest of Armentia in a very precarious state of conservation. In 1974, the Provincial Council of Álava, the owner of this land, began work to improve the gall oak wood and thus initiated the creation of a botanical park in the deforested areas, including native species together with other, more exotic plants and trees. The maples, rowan trees, cypresses and many other species date from that period.

In the mid-90s, the wood showed clear signs of degradation such as the accumulation of rubbish, remains of bonfires, and excessive number of pathways and tracks and numerous eroded and flooded areas. The disorderly influx of visitors and especially vehicles were the main threat for the conservation of this park. The natural gall oak wood contained a large number of small, bushy trees with badly formed bases, and there were few well-developed mature trees.

After being included in the Green Belt, the first work consisted of restructuring the network of paths, improving the main tracks and closing the smaller ones, and the creation of a network of pathways for pedestrians, cyclists and horse riders. The degraded areas were restored, such as rubbish dumps, eroded areas and riverbanks. Additionally, car parks were prepared at the main entrances to the park and two sitting areas were created.

Work to maintain the wood has been and continues to be a key contributing factor to the healthy state of conservation that is apparent today in Armentia park.

=== Map and aerial views ===
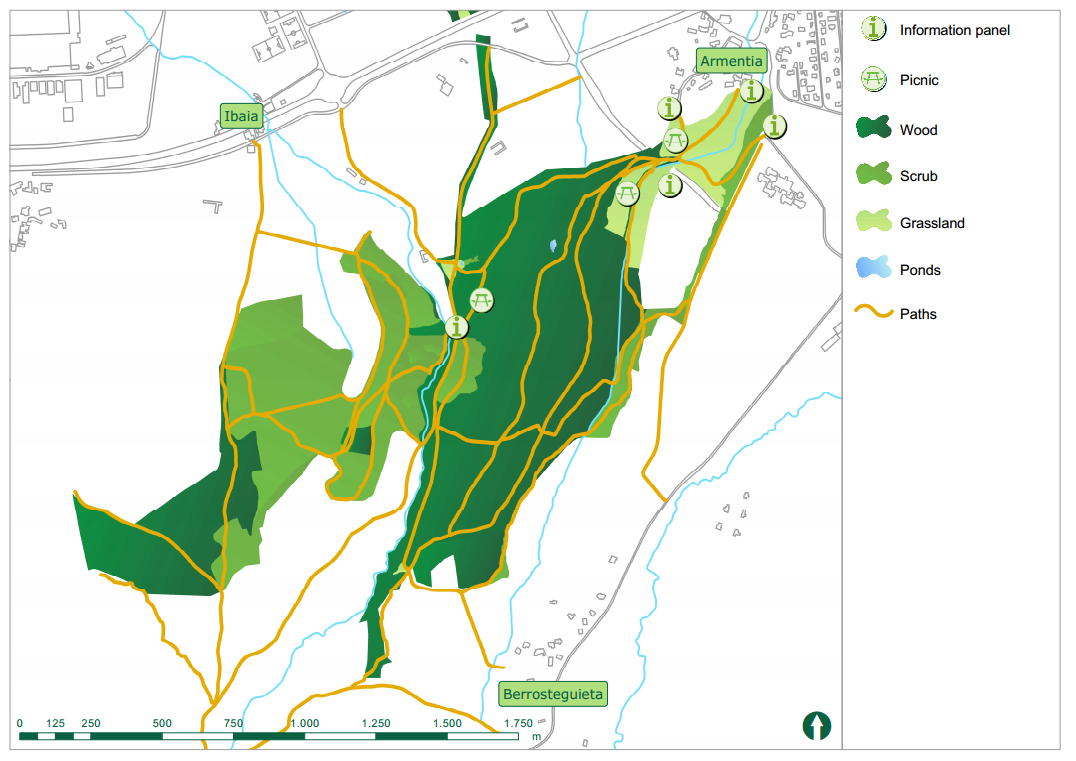
Map of Armentia park

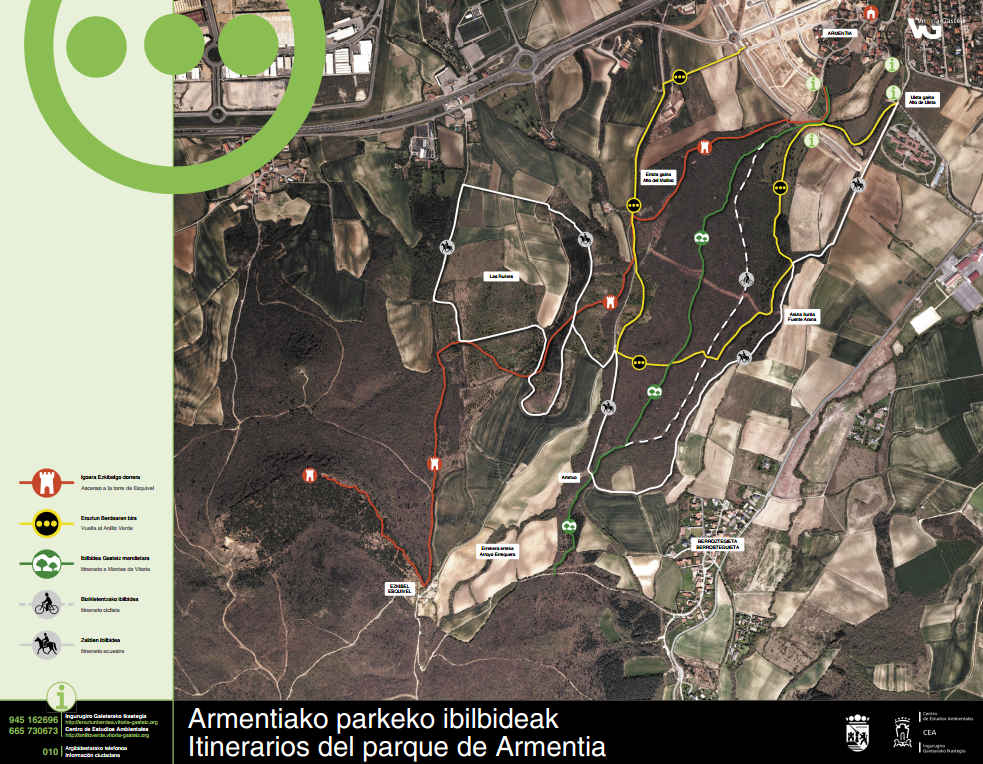
Map of different routes in Armentia park

== Gallery ==
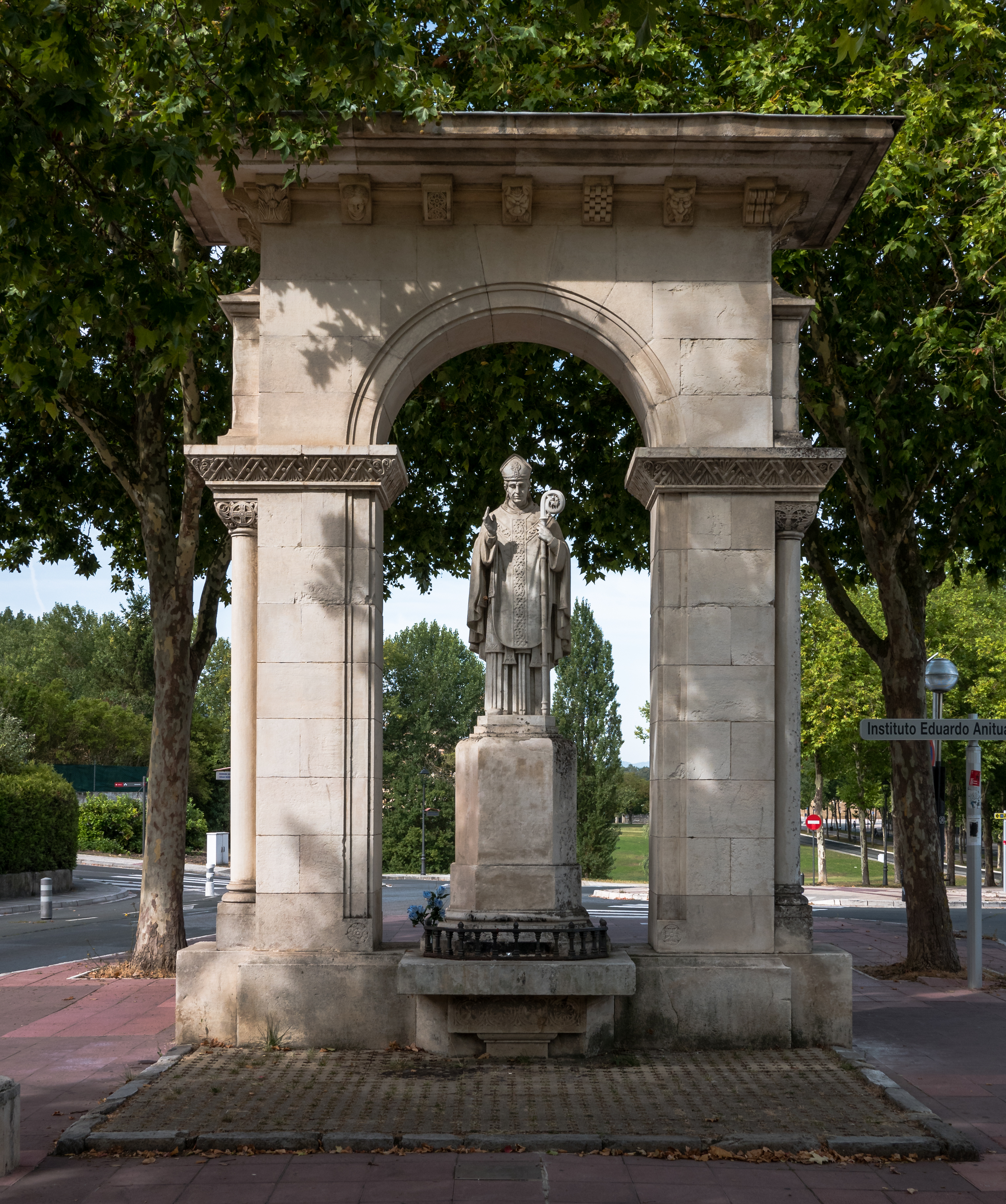
Sculpture of San Prudencio

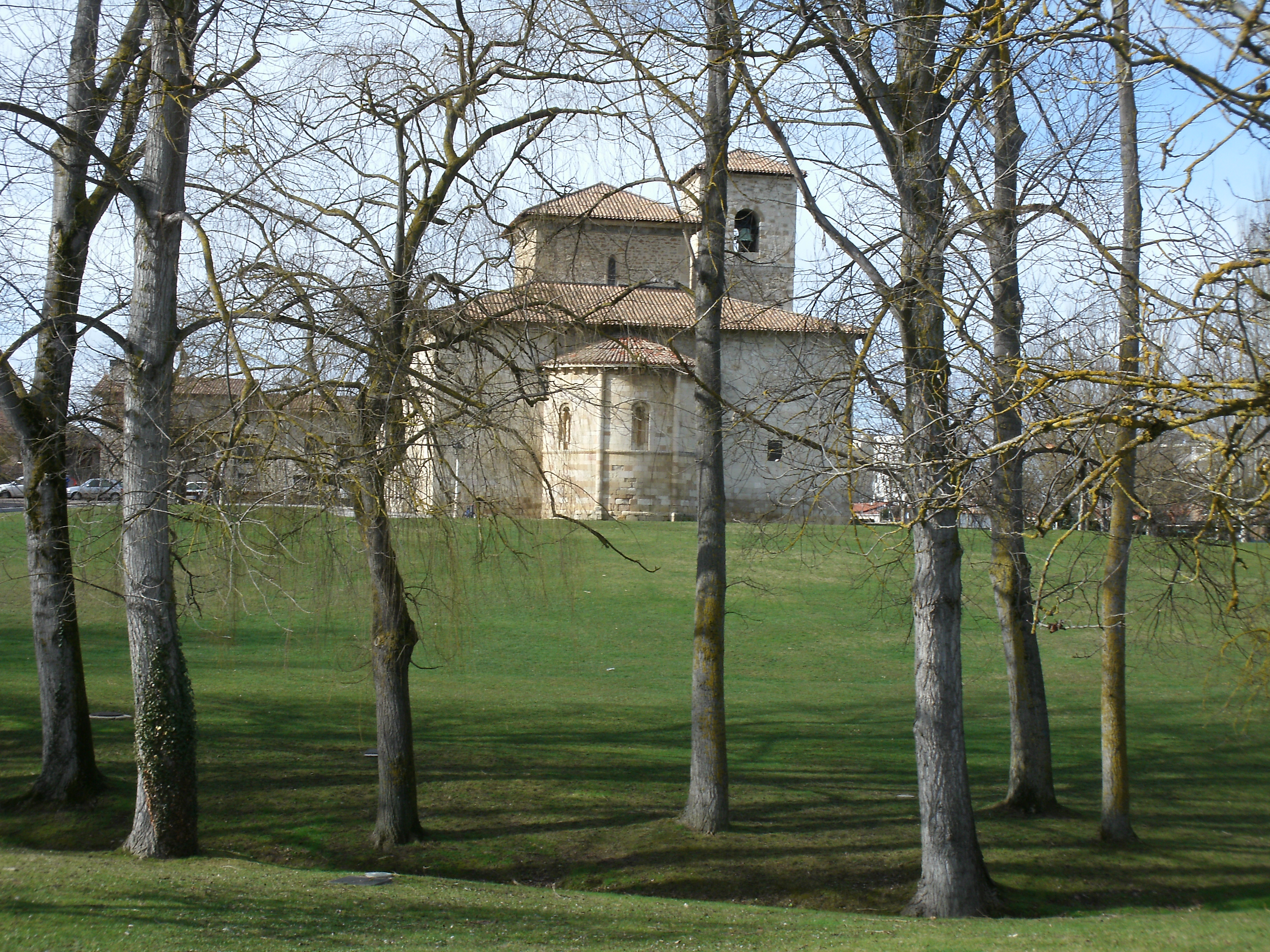
Basilica of San Prudencio

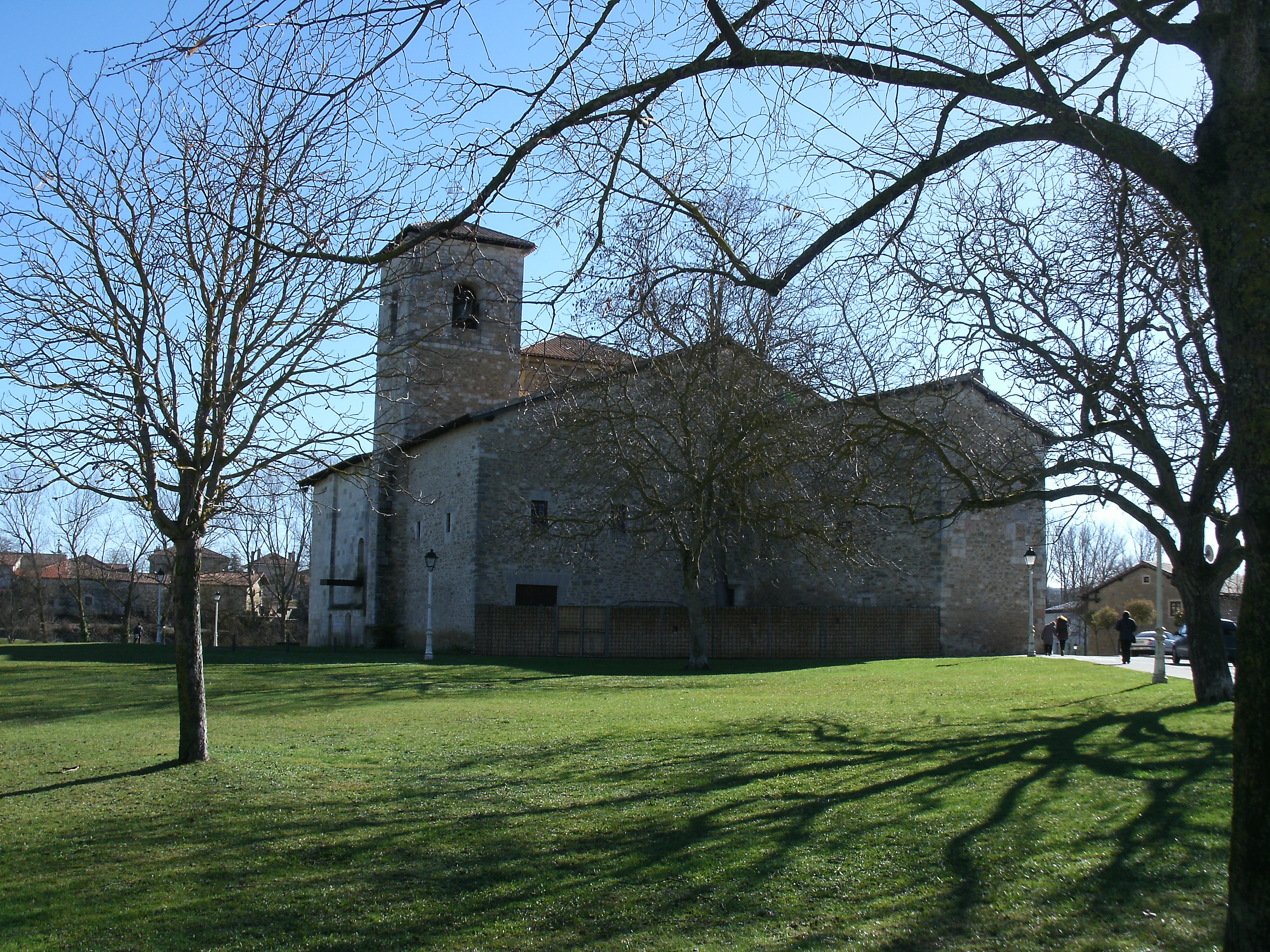
Basilica of San Prudencio

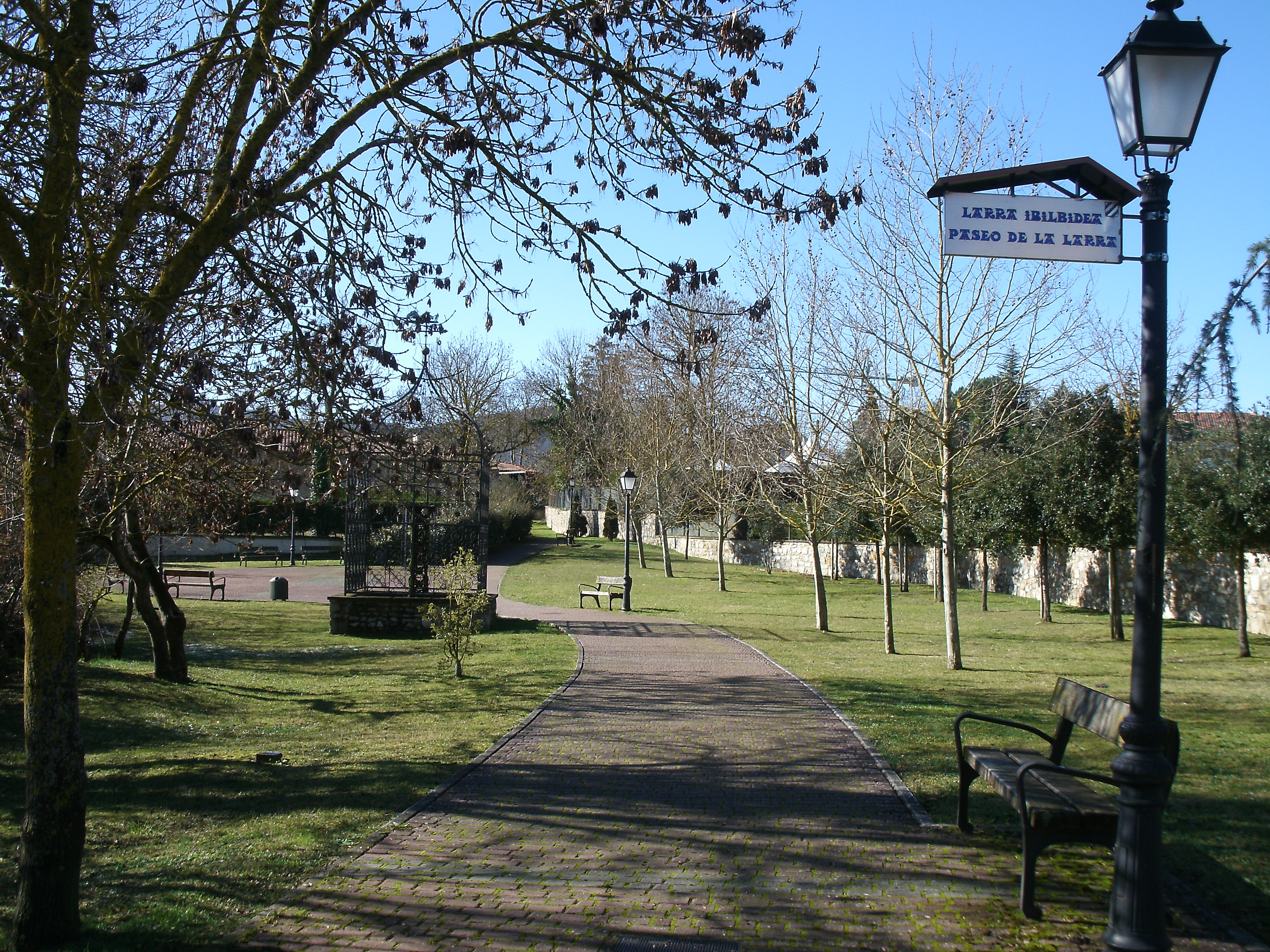
Larra footpath in Armentia

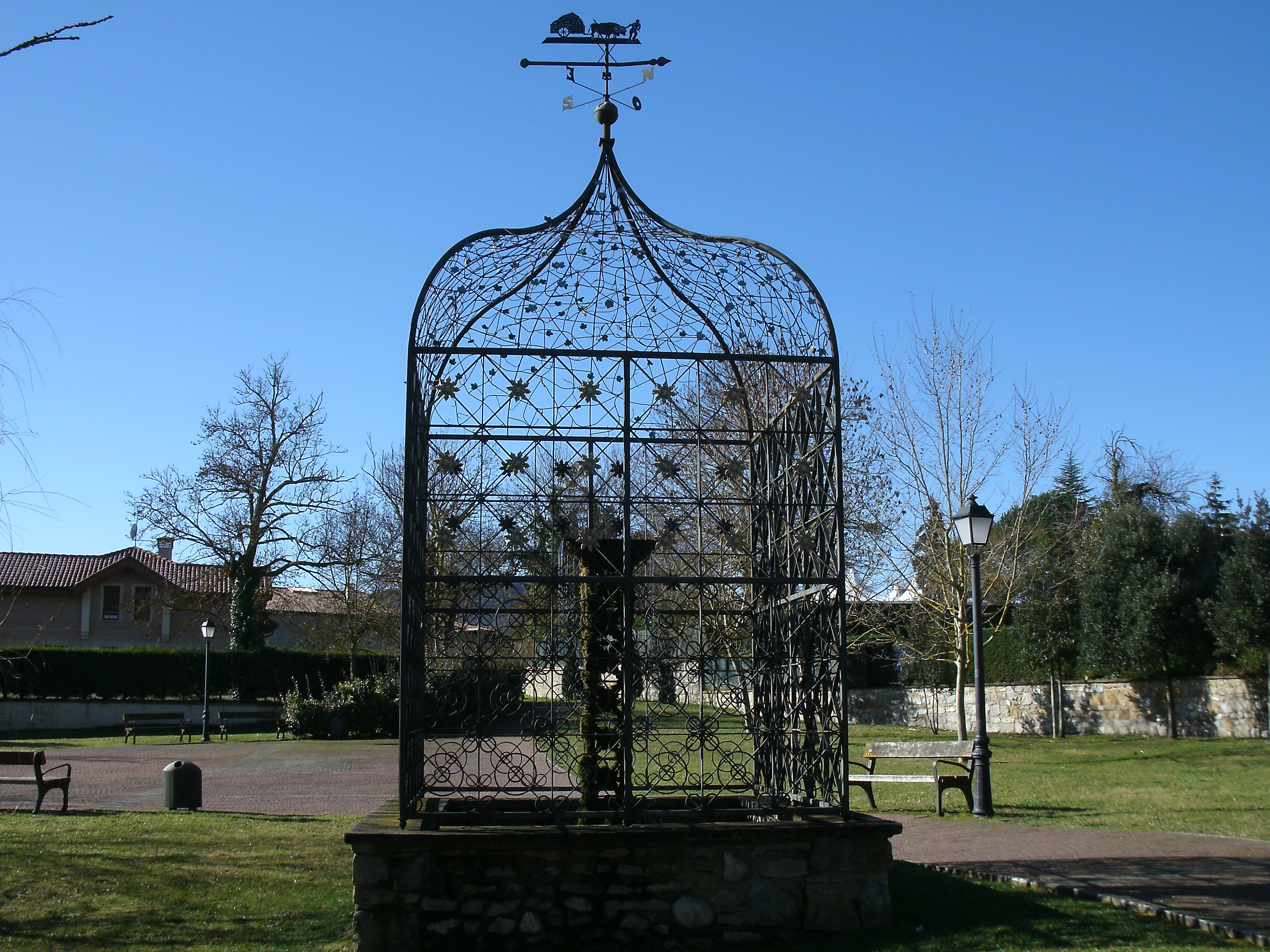
Fountain in Armentia

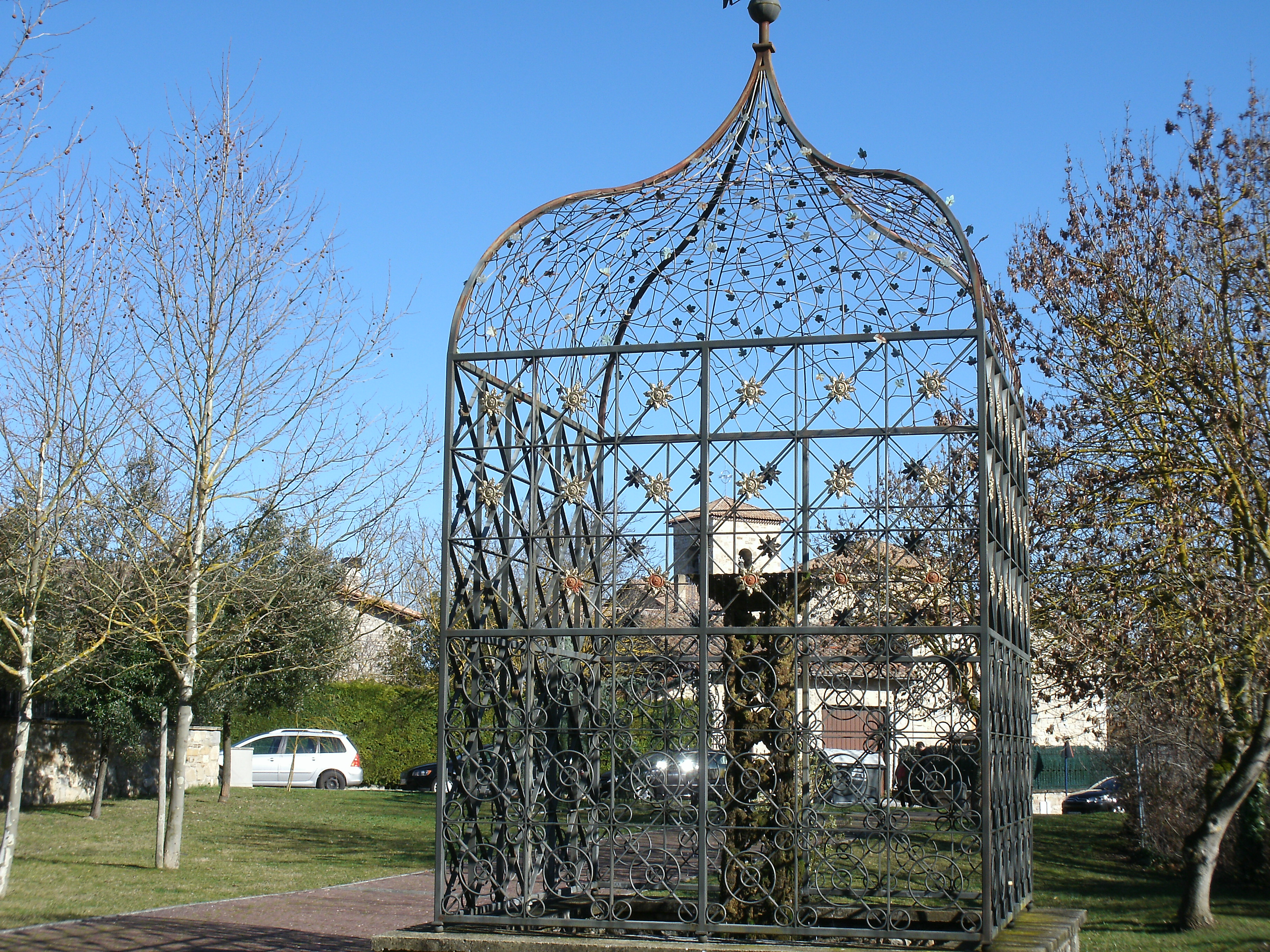
Fountain in Armentia

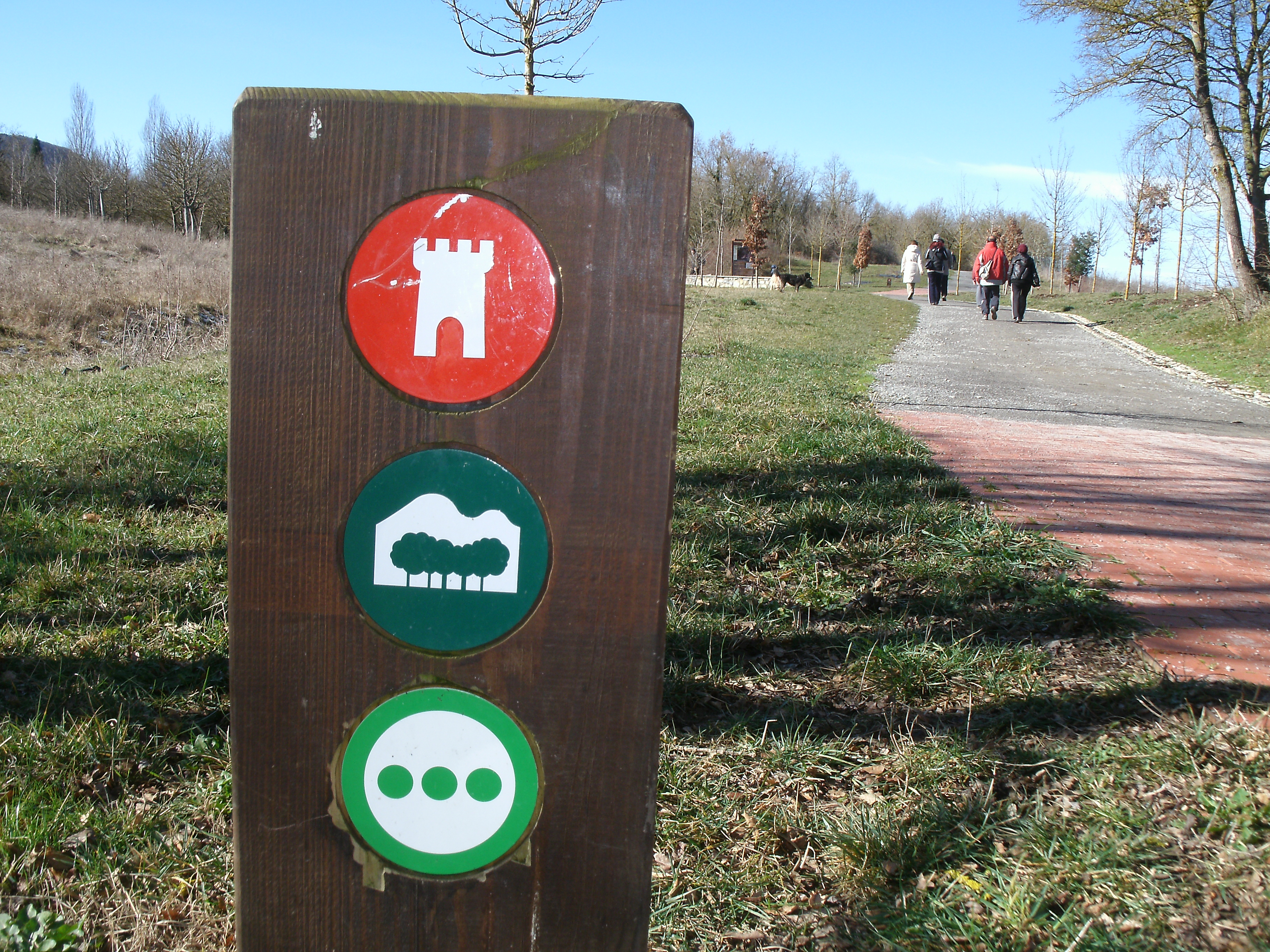
Markers for different ways in Armentia park

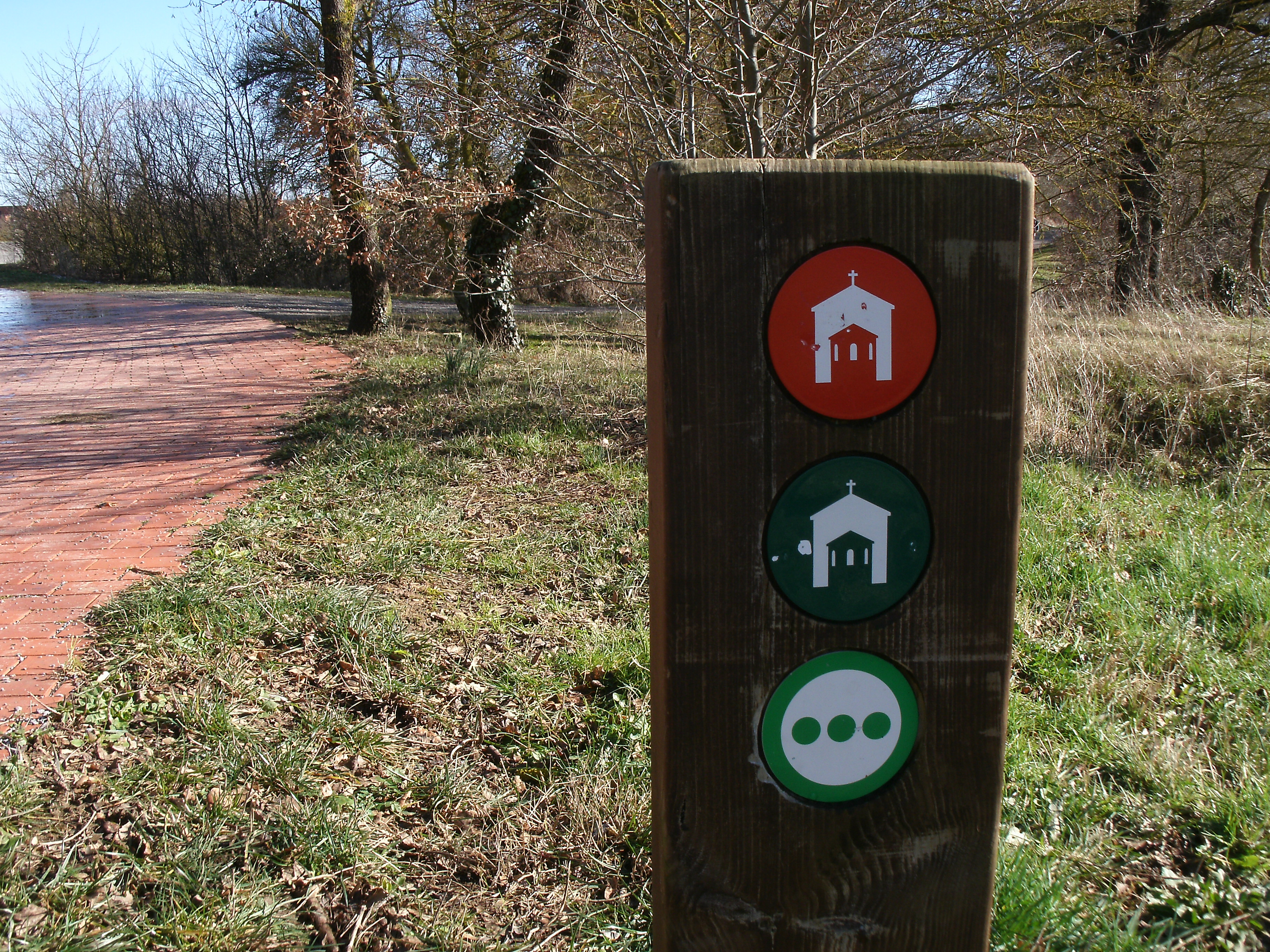
Markers for different ways in Armentia park

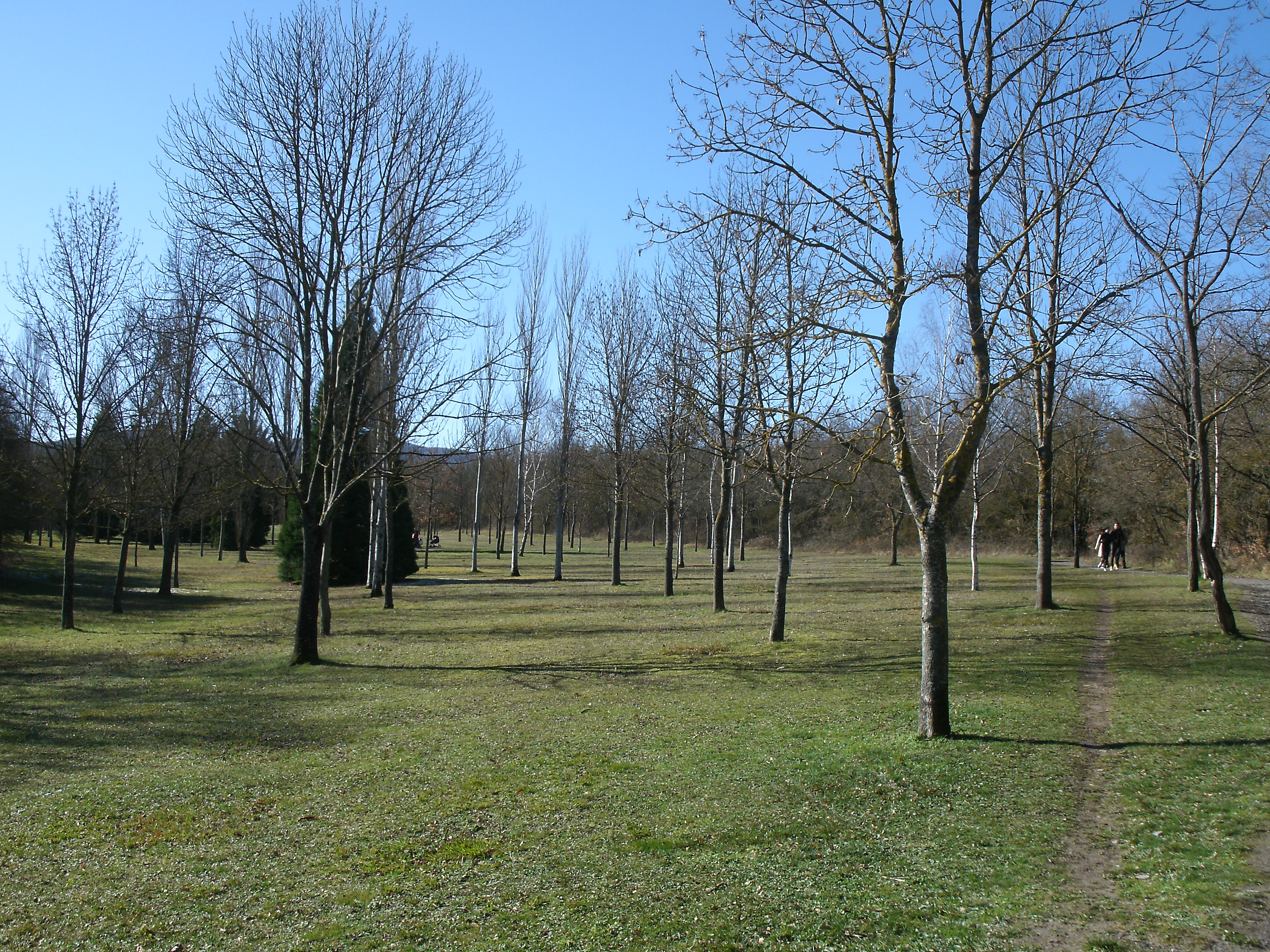
Armentia park

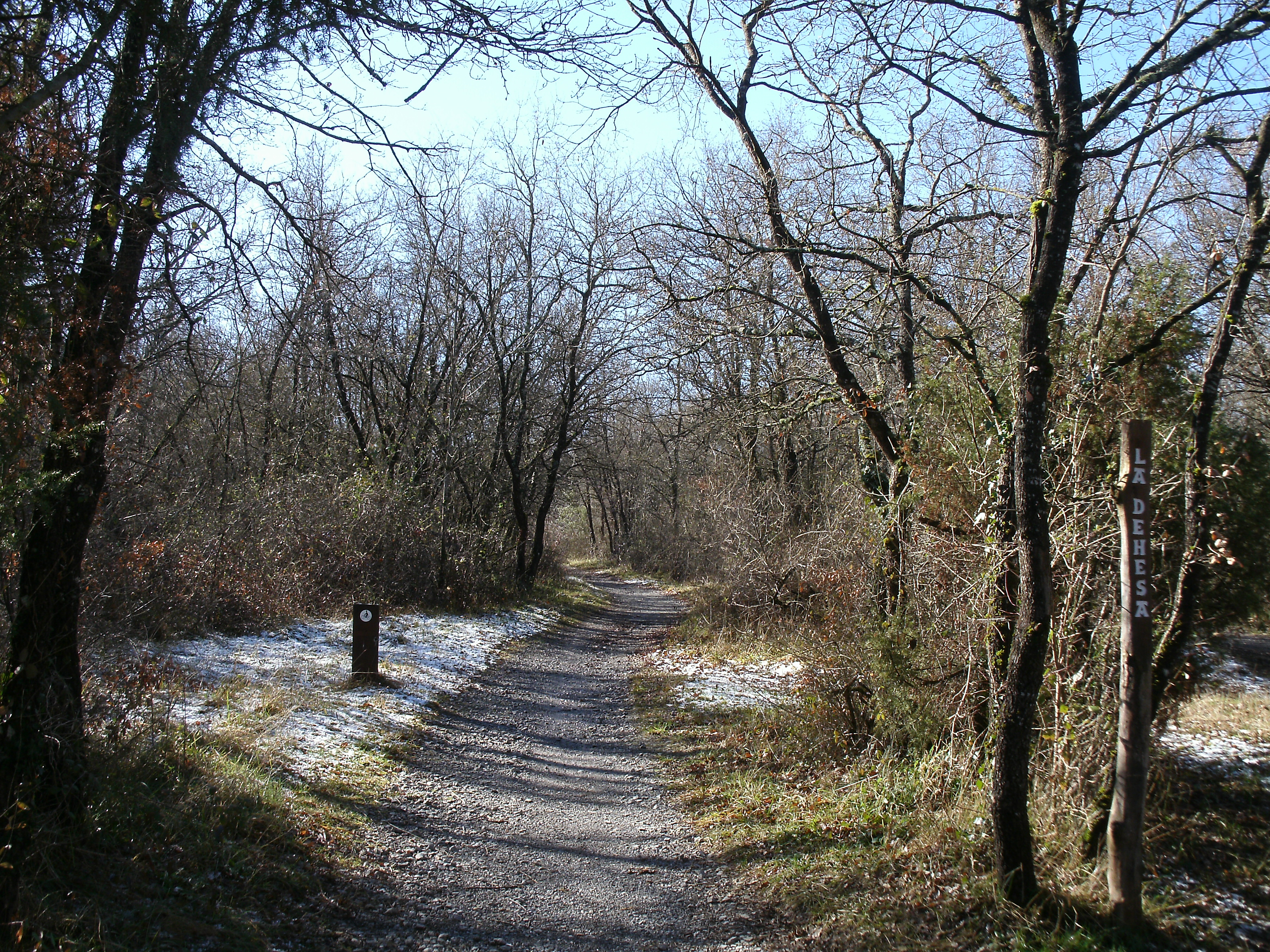
Armentia park after having snowed a little bit. La Dehesa.

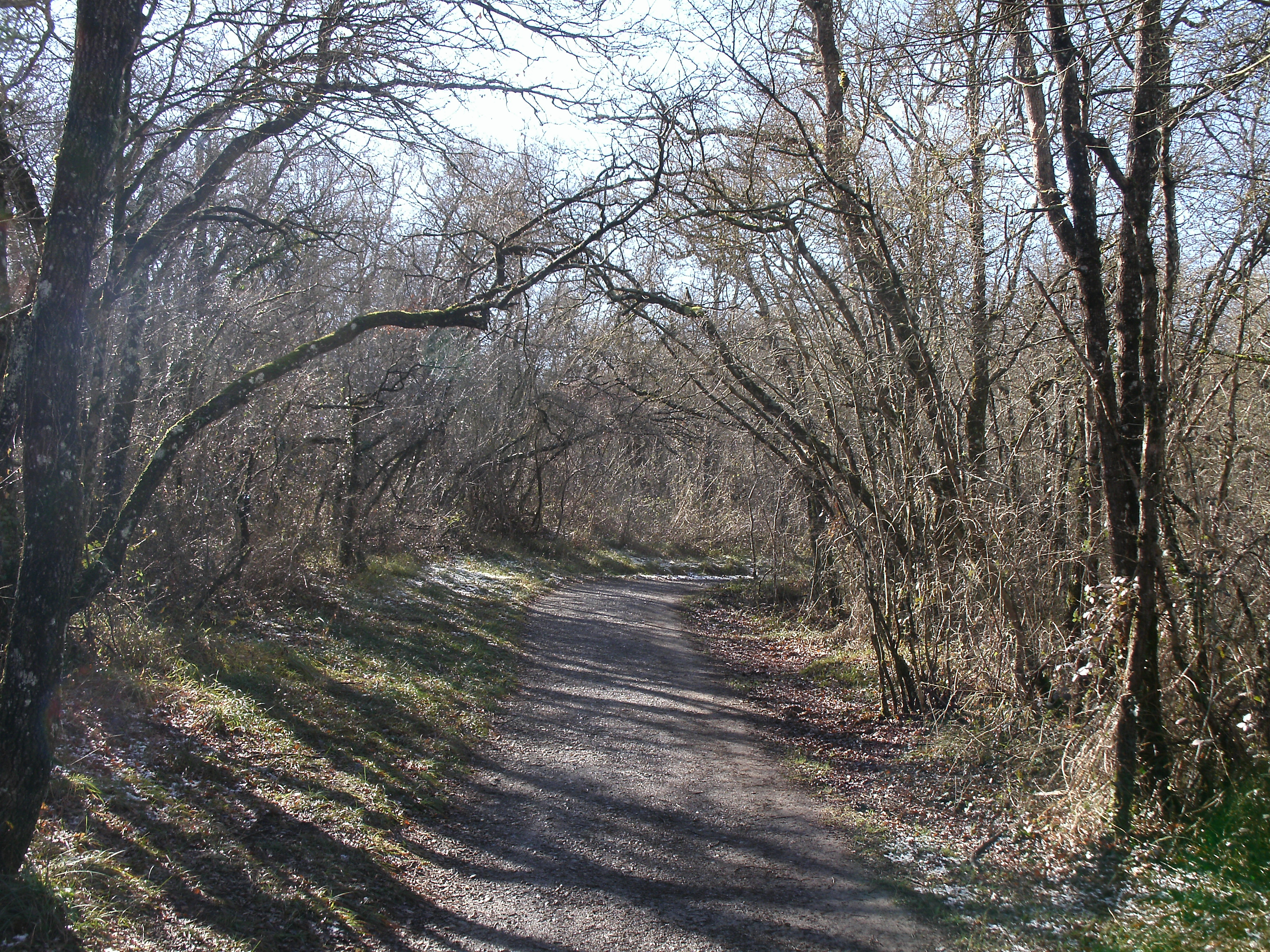
Armentia park after having snowed a little bit

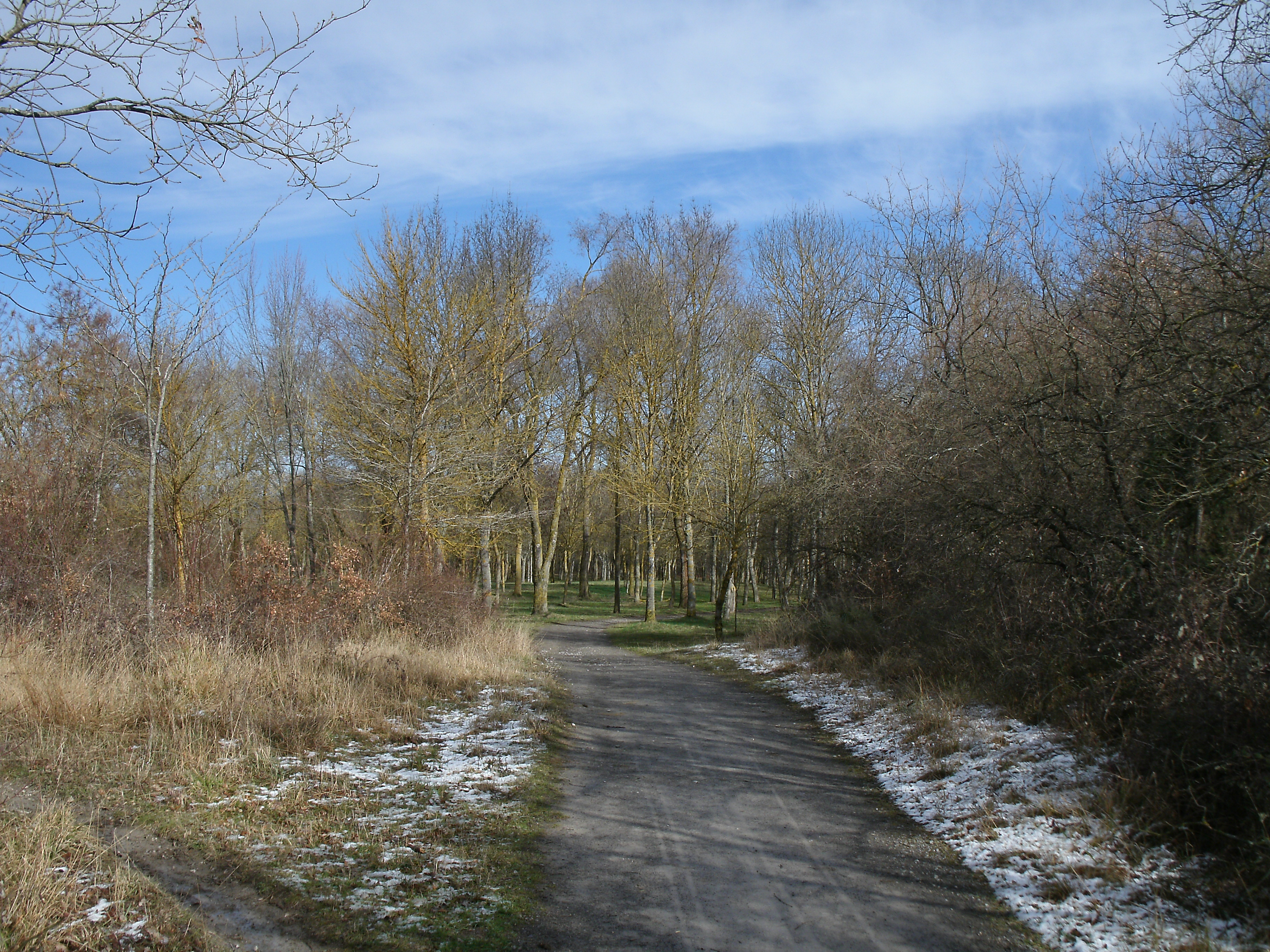
Armentia park after having snowed a little bit

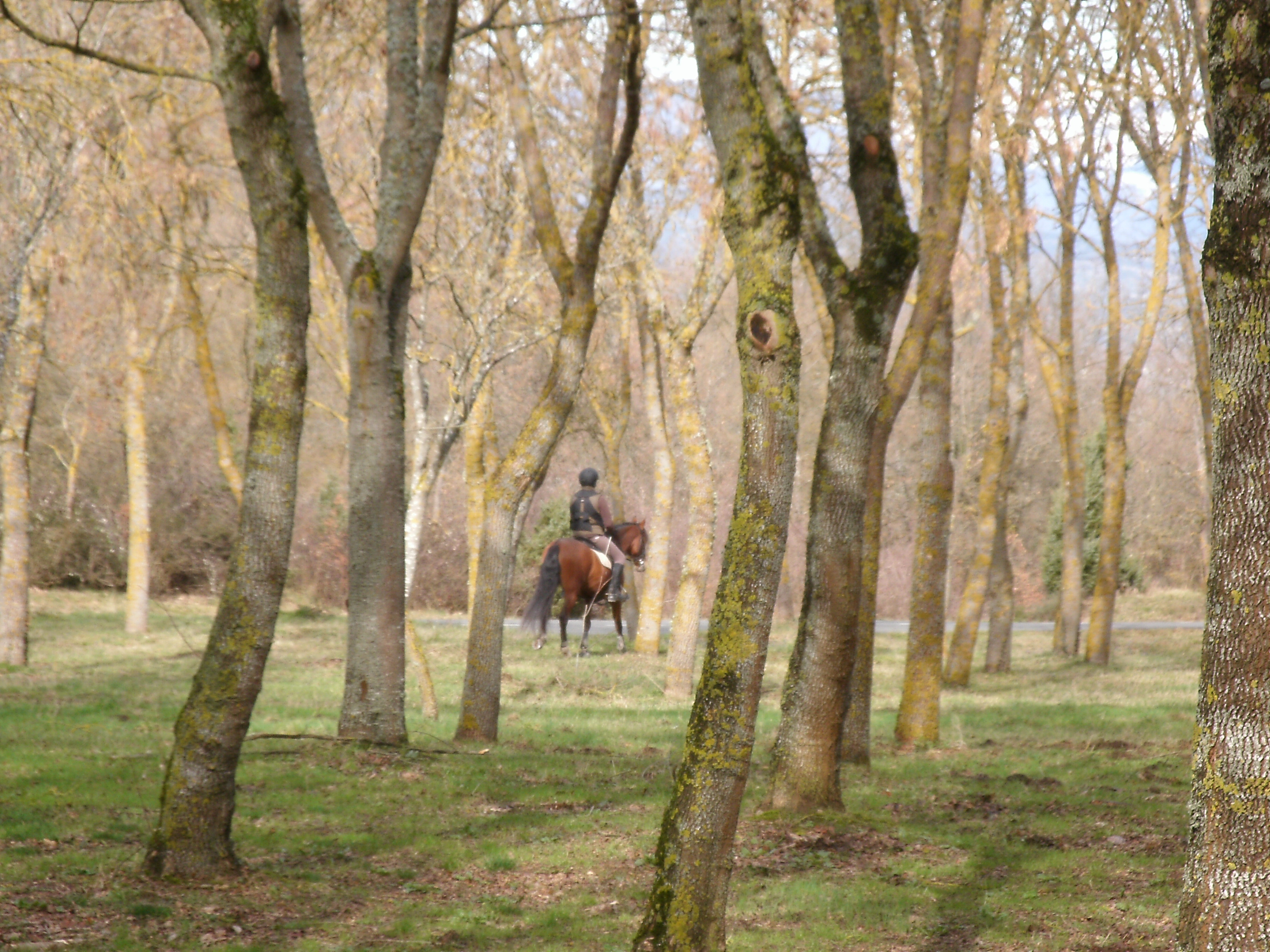
Horse rider in Armentia park

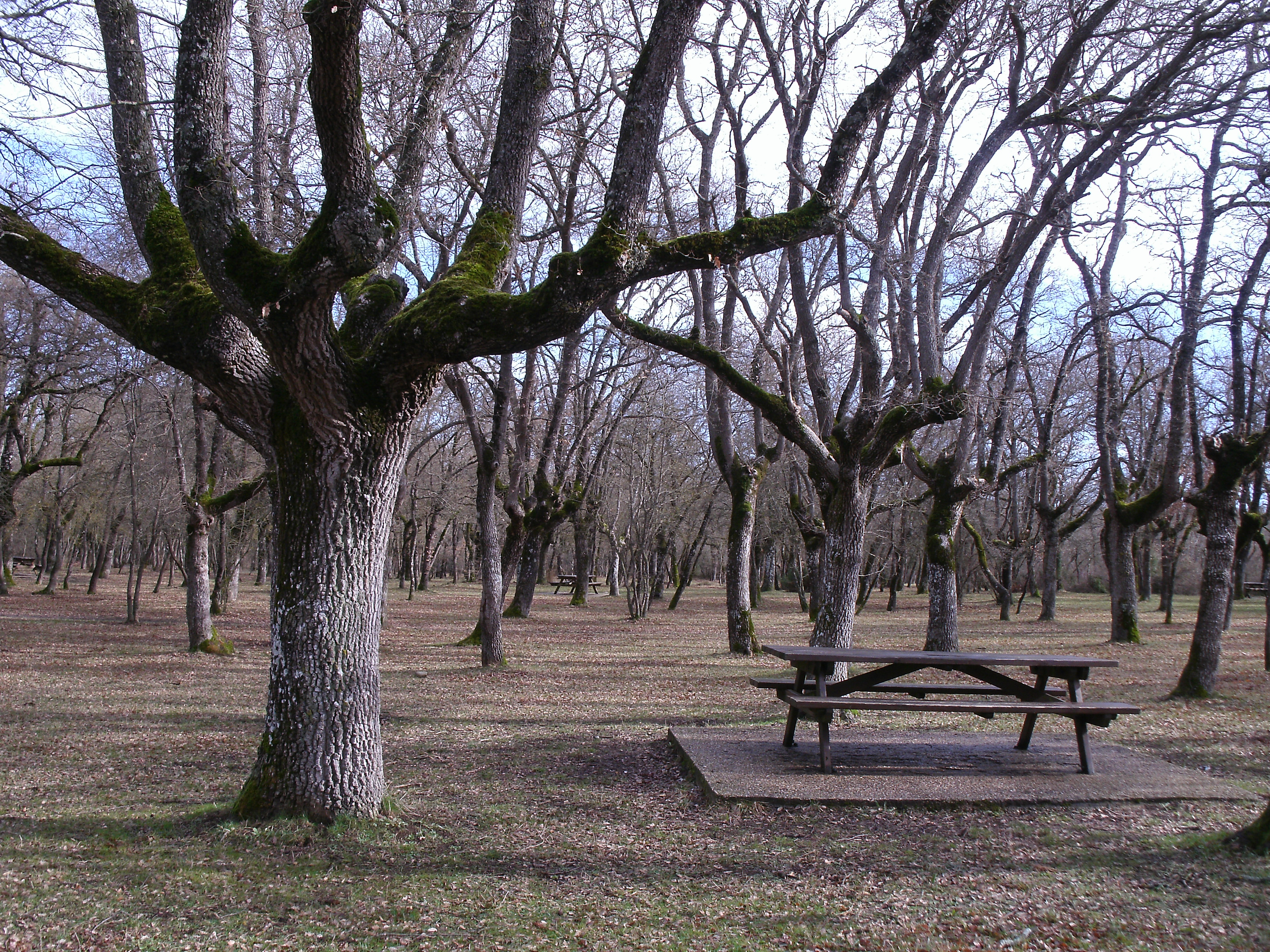
Armentia park

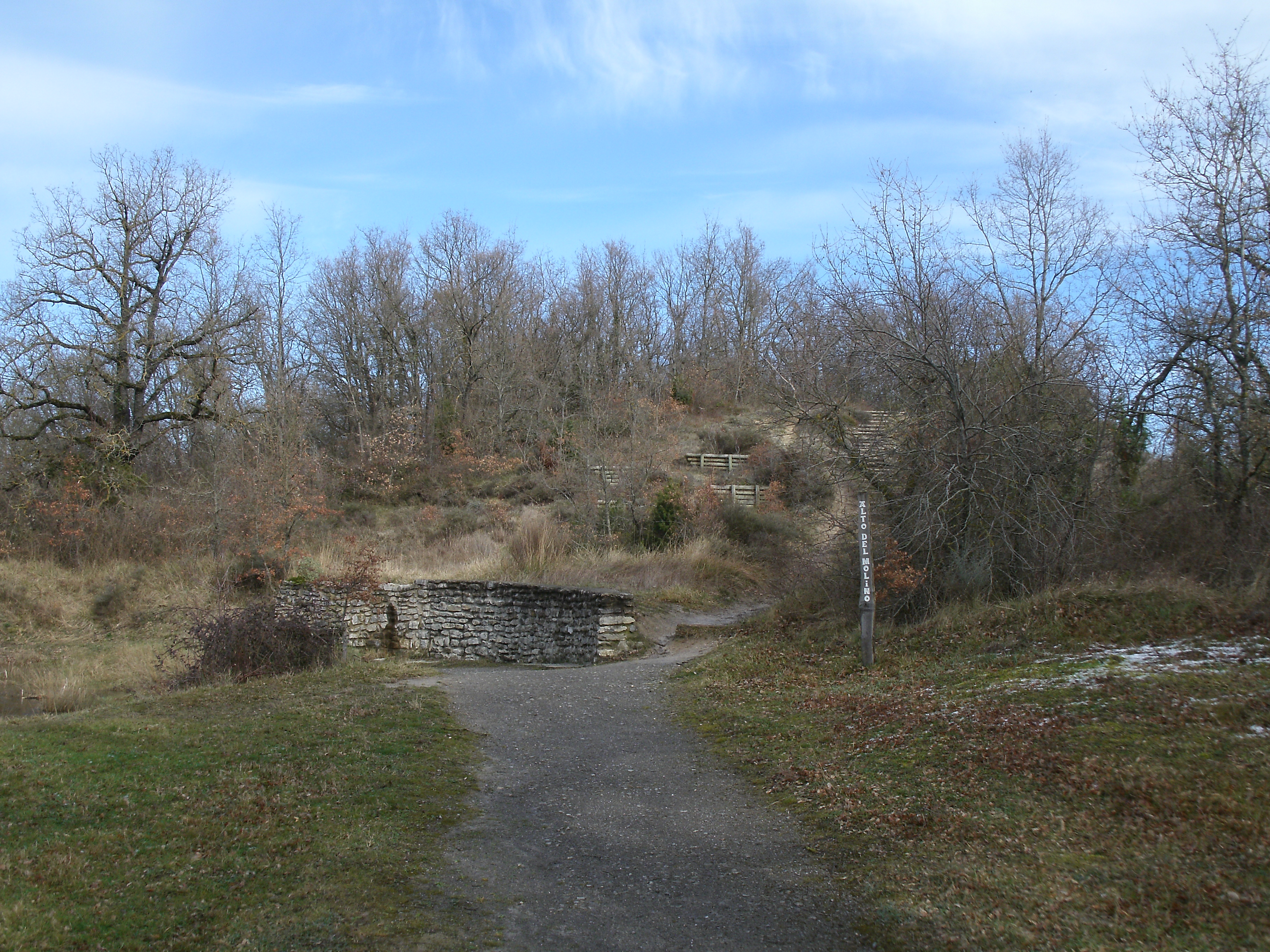
Armentia park. Alto del Molino.

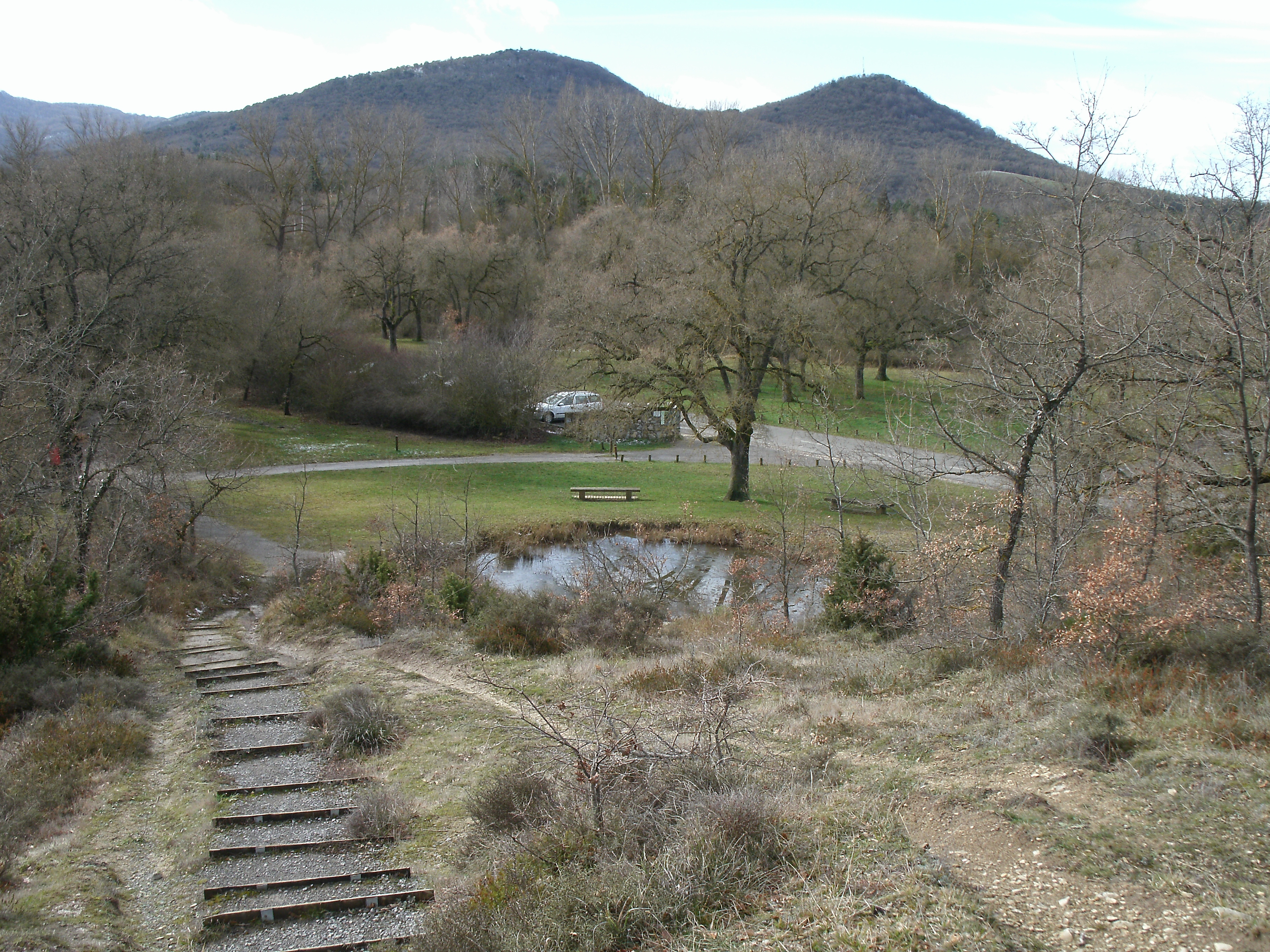
Armentia park. Alto del Molino.

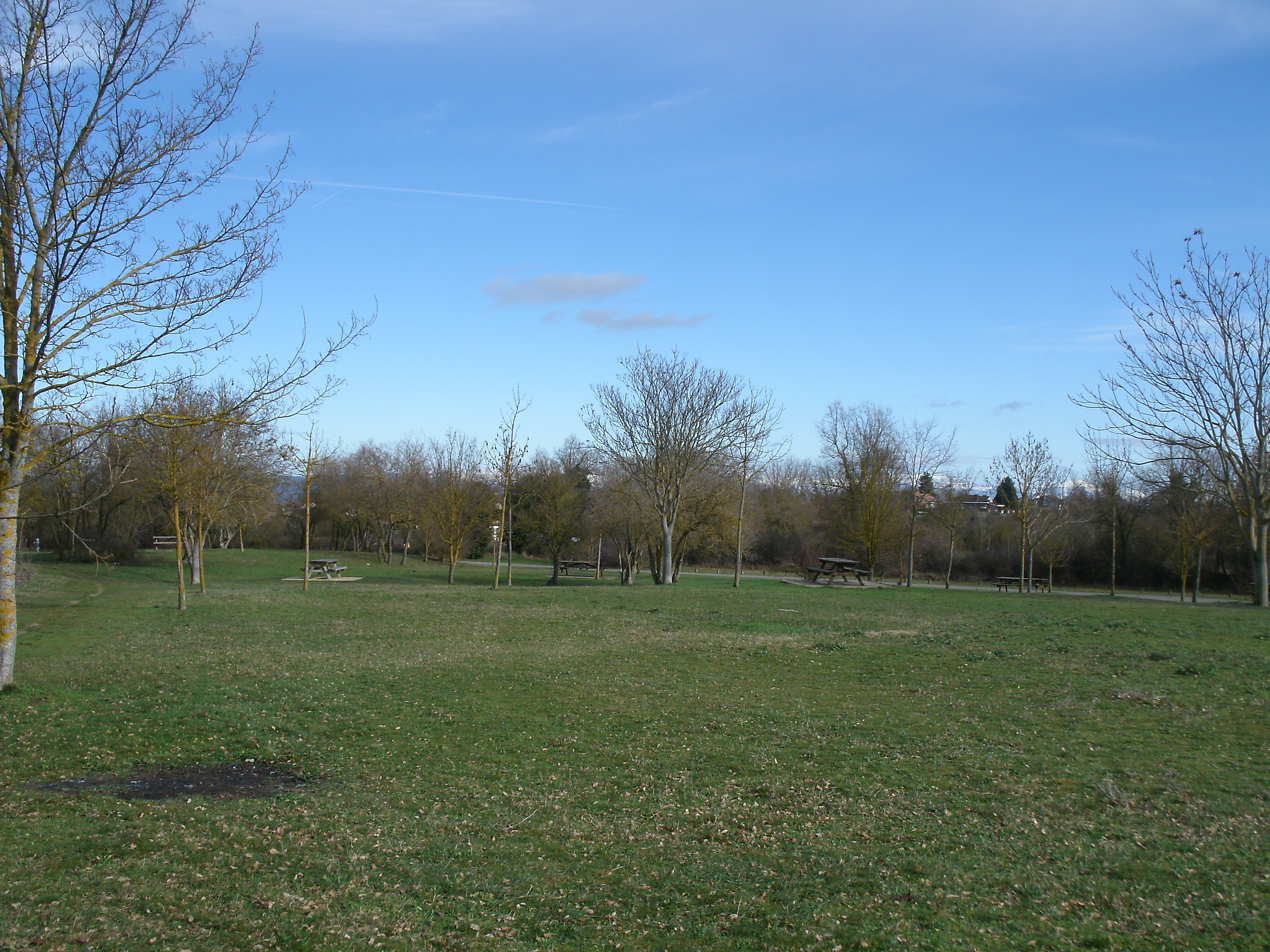
Armentia park

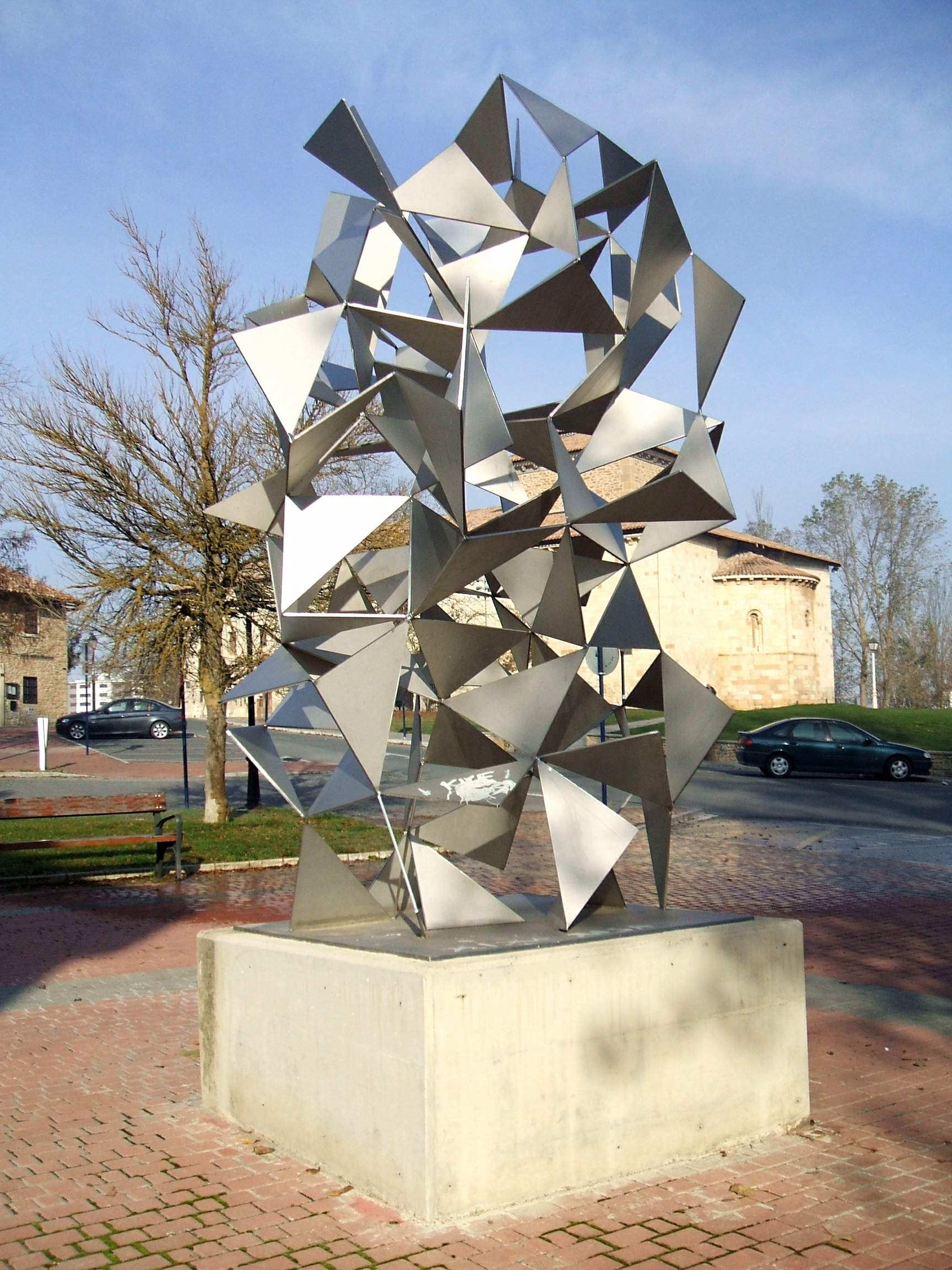
'Implosion' sculpture in Armentia
