= Podolyak =

Podolyak (Belarusian: Падаляк, Russian: Подоляк, Ukrainian: Подоляк) is an East Slavic language toponymic surname literally meaning "seomeone from Podolia". Notable people with the surname include:

- Aleksandr Podolyak (born 1962), former Russian football player
- Ivan Podolyak (born 1990), Russian professional association football player
- Mykhailo Podolyak (born 1972), Ukrainian politician, journalist and negotiator
- Roman Podolyak (born 1993), Ukrainian football defender
