= Mats Johansson =

Mats Johansson may refer to:

- Mats Johansson (footballer) (born 1962), Swedish footballer
- Mats Johansson (politician) (1951–2017), Swedish politician
- Mats Johansson (sailor) (born 1956), Swedish Olympic sailor
- Mats Johansson (skier) (born 1971), Swedish Olympic skier
