= Ariznabarra =

Neighborhood in Vitoria-Gasteiz, Spain

- Neighborhood
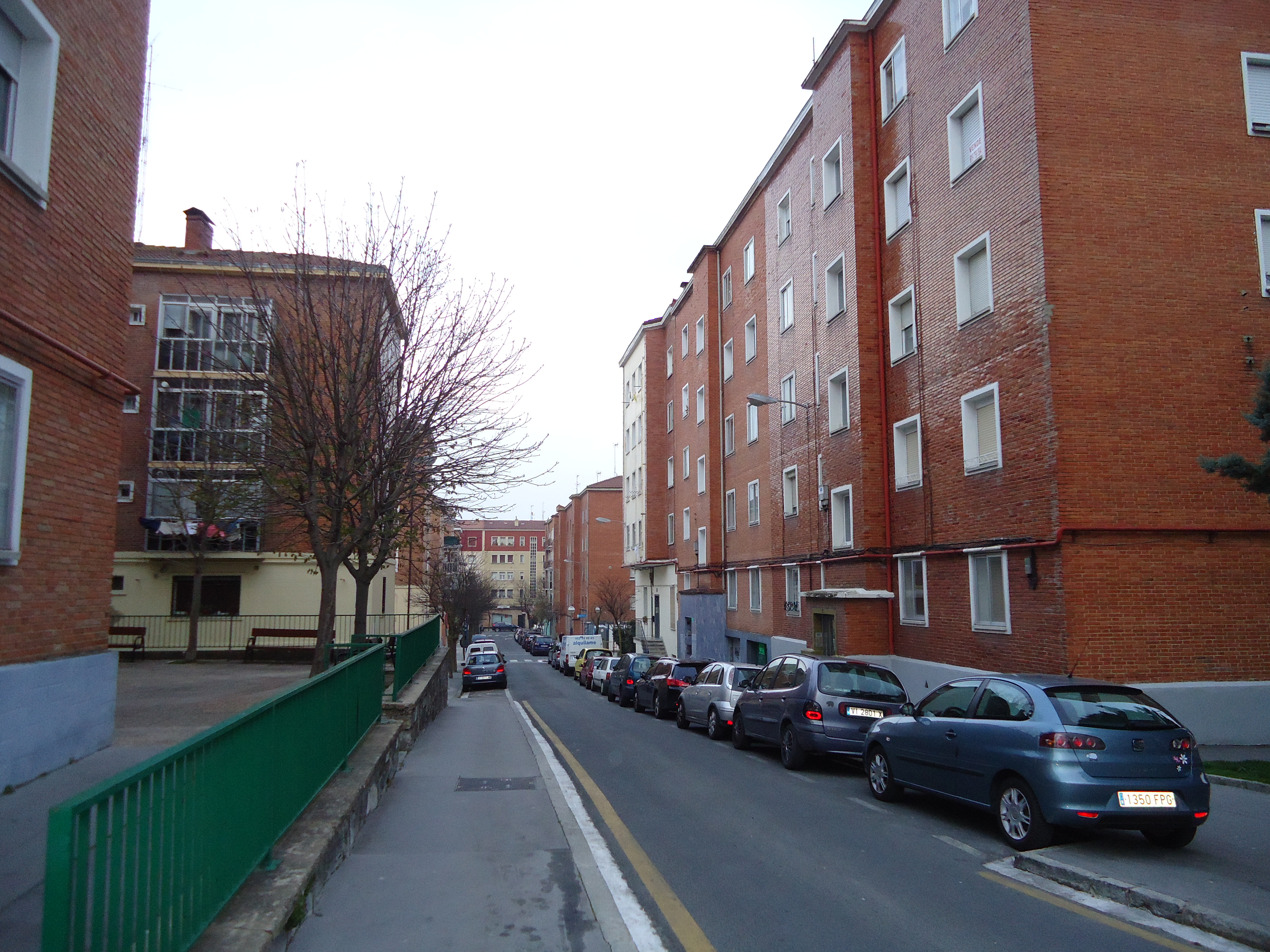
- A street in Ariznabarra
- Interactive map of Ariznabarra
- Coordinates: 42°50′32″N 2°41′33″W
- Country: Spain
- Autonomous community: Basque Country
- Province: Álava
- Comarca: Vitoria-Gasteiz
- Municipality: Vitoria-Gasteiz

Area
  - Total: 0.48 km^{2} (0.19 sq mi)

Population (2022)
  - Total: 7,659
- Postal code: 01007

Ariznabarra (Spanish: Ariznavarra) is a neighborhood in the southwest of Vitoria-Gasteiz, Basque Country, Spain.

== Geography ==
Ariznabarra has a roughly triangular shape. The Madrid–Hendaye railway bounds it to the north, separating it from San Martín. It is bounded by Mendizorrotza and Armentia to the southeast and by the new district of Zabalgana to the west. Most of the streets are named after castles which existed in Álava.

== History ==
Ariznabarra was built in the 1960s, when hundreds of workers arrived from the rest of Spain. It is similar to other neighborhoods built during that time, such as Zaramaga or Arana. Ariznabarra was built by a private developer without any municipal planning. The neighborhood was expanded in the late 1970s and 1980s, the newer apartment buildings are bigger and have private gardens. Despite being peripheral and badly communicated when founded, the continued growth of the city has resulted in Ariznabarra becoming well integrated into the urban structure of Vitoria-Gasteiz.

== Amenities and infrastructure ==
The Hogar San José and Miguel de Cervantes schools are located in the neighborhood. The Ariznabarra municipal community center is home to one of the oldest climbing walls in Spain. The CD Ariznabarra football club is based in Ariznabarra.

Ariznabarra is served by TUVISA municipal buses. One of the lines serving the neighborhood was converted to bus rapid transit standards in 2021.
