= Natxo González =

Spanish footballer and manager

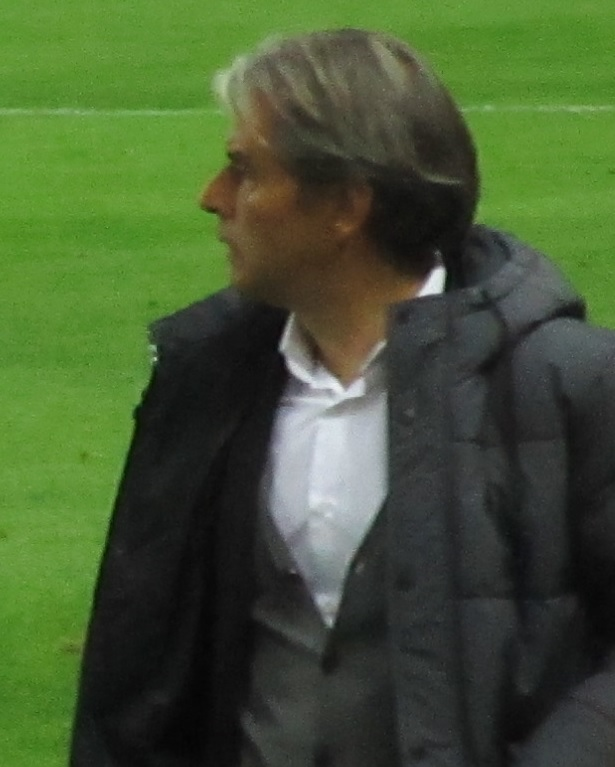
- González managing Zaragoza in 2017

Personal information
- Full name: José Ignacio González Sáenz
- Date of birth: 29 July 1966 (age 60)
- Place of birth: Vitoria-Gasteiz, Spain
- Position: Midfielder

Youth career
- Ariznabarra
- Aurrerá Vitoria

Senior career*
| Years | Team | Apps | (Gls) |
| 1985–1986 | Alegría | | |

Managerial career
- 1986–1992: Ariznabarra (youth)
- 1992–1994: Ariznabarra
- 1994–1997: Alavés (youth)
- 1997–1999: Alavés B
- 2004–2007: Reus
- 2007–2011: Sant Andreu
- 2012–2013: Alavés
- 2014–2017: Reus
- 2017–2018: Zaragoza
- 2018–2019: Deportivo La Coruña
- 2019–2020: Tondela
- 2020–2021: Bolívar
- 2022: Málaga
- 2022–2023: Logroñés
- 2024–2025: Amorebieta
- 2025–2026: Sant Andreu
- * Club domestic league appearances and goals

José Ignacio 'Natxo' González Sáenz (born 29 July 1966) is a Spanish football manager and former player who played as a midfielder.

After a brief playing career as an amateur, he began coaching and led Alavés to the Segunda División in 2013, where he also led Reus, Zaragoza, Deportivo La Coruña and Málaga. Abroad, he had brief spells in the top leagues of Portugal and Bolivia.

== Football career ==
González finished his football career at the age of 20, after only playing amateur football. After starting out as a manager at the same level he took charge of Deportivo Alavés' youth setup in 1994, being promoted to the B-team in 1997.

In 2004, after a year in the club's board, González was appointed at CF Reus Deportiu, being promoted to Segunda División B at the end of the 2004–05 campaign. In his only season in the third tier the Catalans finished 17th, being relegated back to Tercera División in the last matchday.

In June 2007, González signed with UE Sant Andreu, also in Catalonia and the fourth division. He achieved promotion at the first attempt and, four years later, was relieved of his duties due to financial problems.

On 14 June 2012, after nearly a year away from club duty, González was appointed as manager of Alavés, being promoted to Segunda División at the end of the season. He renewed his contract on 7 June 2013, eventually appearing in his first professional match on 16 August, a 0–1 away defeat against Girona FC.

González was sacked on 3 December 2013, with the club second from bottom in Segunda División. On 1 June of the following year, he returned to Reus, now in the third level.

On 8 June 2015, González renewed his contract with Reus for a further year. During the 2015–16 campaign, he led the club to the round of 32 of Copa del Rey, being knocked out by Atlético Madrid, and also reached the promotion play-offs after Reus finished first in its group; in the play-offs, the club defeated Racing de Santander in a 4–0 win on aggregate, and achieved promotion to the second level for the first time ever.

González signed a two-year contract with fellow second tier club Real Zaragoza on 11 June 2017. He later resigned on 11 June 2018, after failing to achieve promotion to La Liga losing 3–2 on aggregate to CD Numancia in the play-offs.

On 15 June 2018, González was appointed manager of Deportivo de La Coruña, also in the second division. He was sacked the following 7 April, following a 0–2 home loss against CF Rayo Majadahonda.

González moved abroad for the first time when was appointed as manager of CD Tondela in the Portuguese Primeira Liga on 14 June 2019. He succeeded Pepa in the role. After keeping the club in the top flight on the last day of the season with a win at Moreirense, he resigned a year early on 5 August 2020.

On 12 December 2020, González was named manager of Bolivian side Club Bolívar. The following 23 May, after the club's elimination from the 2021 Copa Sudamericana, he was sacked.

On 27 January 2022, González was named manager of Málaga CF back in his home country. He was dismissed on 2 April, after only one win in ten matches.

On 22 November 2022, González took over UD Logroñés in Primera Federación, but was sacked the following 27 February, after just one win in 14 matches. On 6 November 2024, he replaced Julen Guerrero at the helm of SD Amorebieta of the same category, but left on 3 June of the following year, after suffering relegation.

On 4 June 2025, González returned to Sant Andreu, with the side in Segunda Federación. The following 6 May, after leading the club to a promotion to the third division, he renewed his link for a further year, but was sacked on 28 October 2026, with just two wins in nine matches.

== Managerial statistics ==
As of match played 27 October 2026

Managerial record by team and tenure
| Team | From | To | Record | | | | | | | | Ref |
| Team | From | To | G | W | D | L | GF | GA | GD | Win % | Ref |
|---|---|---|---|---|---|---|---|---|---|---|---|
| Ariznabarra | 1 July 1992 | 30 June 1994 | 68 | 33 | 20 | 15 | 113 | 63 | +50 | 48.53 | |
| Alavés B | 1 July 1997 | 24 October 1999 | 92 | 39 | 25 | 28 | 141 | 103 | +38 | 42.39 | |
| Reus | 1 July 2004 | 27 June 2007 | 122 | 58 | 31 | 33 | 181 | 118 | +63 | 47.54 | |
| Sant Andreu | 27 June 2007 | 16 June 2011 | 172 | 86 | 53 | 33 | 251 | 141 | +110 | 50.00 | |
| Alavés | 14 June 2012 | 3 December 2013 | 65 | 34 | 16 | 15 | 95 | 59 | +36 | 52.31 | |
| Reus | 1 June 2014 | 11 June 2017 | 130 | 58 | 35 | 37 | 141 | 102 | +39 | 44.62 | |
| Zaragoza | 11 June 2017 | 11 June 2018 | 48 | 22 | 12 | 14 | 64 | 53 | +11 | 45.83 | |
| Deportivo La Coruña | 15 June 2018 | 7 April 2019 | 34 | 13 | 15 | 6 | 42 | 27 | +15 | 38.24 | |
| Tondela | 14 June 2019 | 5 August 2020 | 36 | 9 | 9 | 18 | 30 | 48 | −18 | 25.00 | |
| Bolívar | 12 December 2020 | 25 May 2021 | 24 | 13 | 5 | 6 | 40 | 21 | +19 | 54.17 | |
| Málaga | 27 January 2022 | 2 April 2022 | 10 | 1 | 3 | 6 | 4 | 13 | −9 | 10.00 | |
| Logroñés | 22 November 2022 | 27 February 2023 | 14 | 0 | 8 | 6 | 5 | 13 | −8 | 0.00 | |
| Amorebieta | 6 November 2024 | 4 June 2025 | 27 | 9 | 7 | 11 | 34 | 37 | −3 | 33.33 | |
| Sant Andreu | 4 June 2025 | 28 October 2026 | 46 | 23 | 11 | 12 | 66 | 49 | +17 | 50.00 | |
| Total | | | 888 | 398 | 250 | 240 | 1,207 | 847 | +360 | 44.82 | — |
