= Bernardo Tapia =

Spanish footballer and manager

Personal information
- Full name: Bernardo Tapia Montiel
- Date of birth: 7 July 1962 (age 64)
- Place of birth: Terrassa, Spain
- Height: 1.78 m (5 ft 10 in)
- Position: Midfielder

Team information
- Current team: Deportivo La Coruña (assistant)

Youth career
- Terrassa

Senior career*
Years	Team	Apps	(Gls)
1979–1981	Terrassa		
1981–1984	Salamanca	14	(0)
1982–1983	→ Andorra (loan)		
1985–1986	Algeciras	28	(1)
1986–1987	Albacete	27	(2)
1987–1990	Lugo	101	(24)
1990–1994	Manlleu	127	(25)
1994–1995	Gramenet	19	(4)
1995–1997	Terrassa	66	(10)
Total		382	(66)

Managerial career
- 1997–1999: Terrassa (youth)
- 1999: Terrassa (interim)
- 2000: Terrassa (interim)
- 2007–2008: Sant Andreu (assistant)
- 2011–2012: San Lorenzo
- 2012–2013: Manlleu (youth)
- 2014–2017: Reus (assistant)
- 2017–2018: Zaragoza (assistant)
- 2018–: Deportivo La Coruña (assistant)
- * Club domestic league appearances and goals

Bernardo Tapia Montiel (born 7 July 1962) is a Spanish retired footballer who played as a midfielder, and is the current assistant manager of Deportivo de La Coruña.

== Playing career ==
Born in Terrassa, Barcelona, Catalonia, Tapia finished his formation with Terrassa FC. He made his professional debut on 16 June 1979 at the age of just 16, starting in a 1–1 Segunda División home draw against Barakaldo CF, as his side was already relegated.

In 1981, Tapia joined UD Salamanca still in the second division; after featuring rarely, he was loaned to Segunda División B side Andorra CF the following year. Upon returning, he was assigned to the main squad in La Liga and made his debut in the category on 9 November 1983, playing the last 30 minutes in a 0–4 away loss against Real Sociedad.

Tapia left the Charros in 1985, and subsequently resumed his career in the third division by representing Algeciras CF, Albacete Balompié, CD Lugo, AEC Manlleu, UDA Gramenet and Terrassa. He retired with the latter in 1997, aged 34.

== Managerial career ==
Immediately after retiring, Tapia took over Terrrassa's youth categories until 1999, when he was appointed technical director of the main squad. He also had two spells as an interim manager, with the side in the third division.

Tapia left the Egarenses in 2005, and was appointed UE Sant Andreu's assistant in 2007, after a stint as a scout. In the following year, he was appointed technical secretary, remaining with the role until 2011.

In June 2011, Tapia was appointed manager of lowly locals UD San Lorenzo in the regional leagues. He left the club in 2012, and joined another club he represented as a player, Manlleu, as an assistant of the Juvenil squad; in December of that year, he was named manager of the latter squad.

On 28 June 2014, Tapia was appointed Natxo González's assistant at CF Reus Deportiu. In 2017, he joined González's staff at Real Zaragoza, again as an assistant.
