= Mark McNeil =

English footballer

Personal information
- Full name: Mark John McNeil
- Date of birth: 3 December 1962 (age 63)
- Place of birth: Bethnal Green, England
- Position: Midfielder

Senior career*
Years	Team	Apps	(Gls)
1981–1985	Orient	89	(12)
1985–1986	Aldershot	25	(2)
1986	IFK Holmsund	18	(7)
1987	Grebbestads IF	10	(4)
1987–1990	IFK Holmsund	76	(6)
1991	Gimonäs CK	?	(?)
- * Club domestic league appearances and goals

Mark John McNeil (born 3 December 1962) is an English former professional footballer who played in the Football League as a midfielder.
