= Gometxa =

Hamlet in Álava, Spain

- Concejo
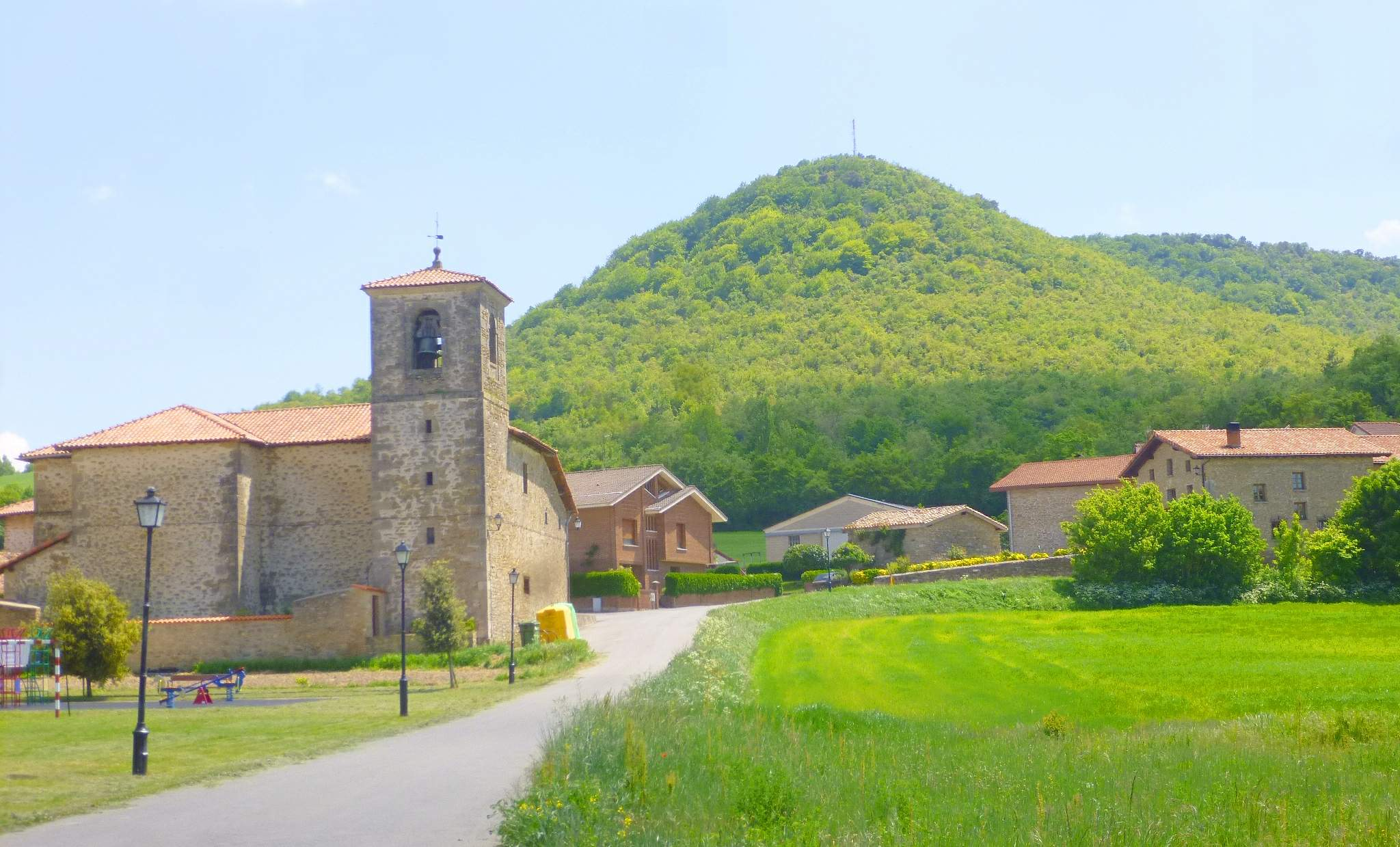
- View of the hamlet

- Coat of arms

- Location within Álava Location within the Basque Country Location within Spain
- Coordinates: 42°49′39″N 2°43′56″W
- Country: Spain
- Autonomous community: Basque Country
- Province: Álava
- Comarca: Vitoria-Gasteiz
- Municipality: Vitoria-Gasteiz
- Elevation: 560 m (1,840 ft)

Population (2021)
  - Total: 53
- Postal code: 01195

Gometxa (Basque pronunciation: [gometʃa], Spanish: Gomecha [gomeˈtʃa]) is a hamlet and concejo located in the municipality of Vitoria-Gasteiz, in Álava province, Basque Country, Spain.
