= Jonas Lind =

Swedish footballer

Personal information
- Full name: Jonas Erik Lind
- Date of birth: 6 June 1962 (age 64)
- Positions: Midfielder; defender

Senior career*
Years	Team	Apps	(Gls)
1979	IF Sylvia		
1980–1995	IFK Norrköping	303	
1996–1998	IF Sylvia		
- * Club domestic league appearances and goals

Jonas Erik Lind (born 6 June 1962) is a Swedish former footballer who played as midfielder or defender.

He played for IFK Norrköping and IF Sylvia, both from Norrköping. He won Allsvenskan with IFK Norrköping in 1989. He was named the best player in Östergötland in 1992. He played a total of 303 Allsvenskan games for Norrköping during his time there.

He later worked as production manager at E.ON in Norrköping.
