= Hubert Thomann =

Swiss footballer (born 1962)

Personal information
- Date of birth: 10 April 1962 (age 64)
- Position: Defender

Senior career*
Years	Team	Apps	(Gls)
1986–1989	FC Malley		
1989–1998	FC Bulle		
- * Club domestic league appearances and goals

Hubert Thomann (born 10 April 1962) is a retired Swiss football defender.
