= CD Ariznabarra =

Association football club in Spain

Coordinates: 42.843992°N 2.690746°W

Ariznabarra
- Full name: Club Deportivo Ariznabarra
- Nicknames: Celestes (the sky blues); Ariz
- Founded: 1972
- Ground: Ariznabarra, Vitoria-Gasteiz, Basque Country, Spain
- Capacity: 2,500
- Chairman: Jonatan Torio
- League: División de Honor
- 2025–26: División de Honor, 8th of 16
- Website: http://www.cdariznabarra.com
Home colours	Away colours

Club Deportivo Ariznabarra is a Spanish football club based in Vitoria-Gasteiz, in the autonomous community of Basque Country. Founded in 1972, it currently plays in the División de Honor, holding home games at Campo municipal de Ariznabarra.

Ariznabarra is a feeder club of Real Sociedad de Fútbol, their reference club in the city of Vitoria.

== Season to season ==
Season	Tier	Division	Place	Copa del Rey
1988–89	6	1ª Reg.	3rd	
1989–90	5	Reg. Pref.	7th	
1990–91	5	Reg. Pref.	9th	
1991–92	5	Reg. Pref.	13th	
1992–93	5	Reg. Pref.	4th	
1993–94	5	Reg. Pref.	3rd	
1994–95	5	Reg. Pref.	9th	
1995–96	5	Reg. Pref.	6th	
1996–97	5	Reg. Pref.	11th	
1997–98	5	Reg. Pref.	12th	
1998–99	5	Reg. Pref.	6th	
1999–2000	5	Reg. Pref.	8th	
2000–01	5	Reg. Pref.	9th	
2001–02	5	Reg. Pref.	2nd	
2002–03	5	Reg. Pref.	3rd	
2003–04	5	Reg. Pref.	2nd	
2004–05	5	Reg. Pref.	6th	
2005–06	5	Reg. Pref.	3rd	
2006–07	5	Reg. Pref.	6th	
2007–08	5	Reg. Pref.	3rd	

Season	Tier	Division	Place	Copa del Rey
2008–09	5	Reg. Pref.	6th	
2009–10	5	Reg. Pref.	4th	
2010–11	5	Reg. Pref.	7th	
2011–12	5	Reg. Pref.	10th	
2012–13	5	Reg. Pref.	4th	
2013–14	5	Reg. Pref.	6th	
2014–15	5	Reg. Pref.	8th	
2015–16	5	Reg. Pref.	4th	
2016–17	5	Reg. Pref.	2nd	
2017–18	5	Reg. Pref.	2nd	
2018–19	5	Reg. Pref.	1st	
2019–20	4	3ª	20th	
2020–21	4	3ª	10th / 9th	
2021–22	6	Reg. Pref.	10th	
2022–23	6	Div. Hon.	4th	
2023–24	6	Div. Hon.	3rd	
2024–25	6	Div. Hon.	2nd	
2025–26	6	Div. Hon.		

- 5 seasons in Tercera División
- 2 seasons in Tercera Federación

== Famous players ==
- (Spain) Gaizka Toquero
- (Spain) Pedro Uralde
- (Spain) Daniel Vivian
