= Roman Podolyak =

Ukrainian footballer

Personal information
- Full name: Roman Mykhaylovych Podolyak
- Date of birth: 21 April 1993 (age 33)
- Place of birth: Ukraine
- Height: 1.82 m (5 ft 11 1/2 in)
- Position: Defender

Team information
- Current team: FC Skala Stryi
- Number: 3

Youth career
- 2006–2010: UFK Lviv

Senior career*
Years	Team	Apps	(Gls)
2010–2014	FC Karpaty Lviv	0	(0)
2010	→FC Karpaty-2 Lviv	2	(0)
2014	→FC Bukovyna Chernivtsi (loan)	4	(1)
2014–	FC Skala Stryi	45	(4)
- * Club domestic league appearances and goals as of 2 February 2017

Roman Podolyak (Ukrainian: Роман Михайлович Подоляк; born 21 April 1993) is a professional Ukrainian football defender who currently plays for FC Skala Stryi in the Ukrainian First League.

Podolyak is the product of the UFK Lviv School System. He made his debut for FC Bukovyna played a full-time game against FC Olimpik Donetsk on 29 March 2014 in the Ukrainian First League.
