= David Boulter =

English footballer

Personal information
- Full name: David Arthur Boulter
- Date of birth: 5 October 1962 (age 64)
- Place of birth: Stepney, England
- Position: Full back

Youth career
- –1981: Crystal Palace

Senior career*
Years	Team	Apps	(Gls)
1981–1982	Crystal Palace	16	(0)
1981	→ MyPa (loan)	13	(0)
1982–1983	Crawley Town		
1983–1984	Enfield	5	(0)
- * Club domestic league appearances and goals

David Arthur Boulter (born 5 October 1962) is an English, retired professional footballer who played as a full back and made 16 appearances in the Football League for Crystal Palace.

== Playing career ==
Boulter was born HACKNEY, Greater London. He began his youth career at Crystal Palace and signed professional terms in 1981. In the summer of 1981 he had a two-month loan spell with Finnish second division side Myllykosken Pallo -47. Boulter made his Palace debut on 21 November 1981 in a 0–0 draw away to Oldham Athletic, and between then and the end of March 1982 missed only one league or cup game. However, he then lost his place as Paul Hinshelwood and Steve Lovell became the regular full-backs, and at the end of the season, he moved on to non-league football with Crawley Town.
