= Lermanda =

Hamlet in Álava, Spain

- Concejo
- Coat of arms

- Location within Álava Location within the Basque Country Location within Spain
- Coordinates: 42°50′37″N 2°44′45″W
- Country: Spain
- Autonomous community: Basque Country
- Province: Álava
- Comarca: Vitoria-Gasteiz
- Municipality: Vitoria-Gasteiz
- Elevation: 508 m (1,667 ft)

Population (2022)
  - Total: 17
- Postal code: 01195

Lermanda is a hamlet and concejo in the municipality of Vitoria-Gasteiz, in Álava province, Basque Country, Spain. The hamlet has been surrounded by the growth of the Jundiz industrial park.
