= Marco Antonio Barrero =

Bolivian footballer (born 1962)

Personal information
- Full name: Marco Antonio Barrero Jordán
- Date of birth: 26 January 1962 (age 64)
- Place of birth: Santa Cruz de la Sierra, Bolivia
- Position: Goalkeeper

Senior career*
Years	Team	Apps	(Gls)
1984–1987	Jorge Wilstermann		
1988–1993	Bolívar		
1993–1994	Guabirá		
1994–1998	Oriente Petrolero		
1998–2001	The Strongest		

International career^{‡}
1987–1999	Bolivia	32	(0)
- * Club domestic league appearances and goals ‡ National team caps and goals as of 9 June 2016

Marco Antonio Barrero Jordán (born January 26, 1962, in Santa Cruz de la Sierra) is a Bolivian retired football goalkeeper.

== Career ==
He played for several clubs, including Wilstermann, Bolívar, The Strongest and Guabirá. Between 1987 and 1999, Barrero obtained a total number of 32 caps for the Bolivia national team.
