= Felipe Peralta =

Paraguayan footballer (born 1962)

Felipe Nery Peralta
Personal information
- Full name: Felipe Peralta
- Date of birth: 2 May 1962 (age 64)
- Place of birth: Paraguay
- Position: Midfielder

Senior career*
Years	Team	Apps	(Gls)
1991	Atlético Colegiales		
1992	Deportivo Pereira		
1993	Olimpia		

International career
1991	Paraguay	5	(0)
- * Club domestic league appearances and goals

Felipe Peralta (born 2 May 1962) is a retired football midfielder from Paraguay. He played professional football in Paraguay, and also had a spell in Colombia, playing for Deportivo Pereira.

In late 1991, Paraguayan manager César López Fretes brought Peralta to Deportivo Pereira on loan, making him one of four Paraguayan footballers to join the club under the newly-hired López Fretes.

== International ==
Peralta made his international debut for the Paraguay national football team on 14 June 1991 in a Copa Paz del Chaco match against Bolivia (0-1 win). He obtained a total number of five international caps, scoring no goals for the national side.
