= Rob Vincent (footballer, born 1962) =

English footballer

Personal information
- Full name: Robert George Vincent
- Date of birth: 23 November 1962 (age 63)
- Place of birth: Newcastle, England
- Height: 5 ft 10 in (1.78 m)
- Position: Forward

Senior career*
Years	Team	Apps	(Gls)
1979–1982	Sunderland	2	(0)
1982–1983	Orient	9	(0)
1983	Heidelberg United		
1983–1985	Brisbane Lions		
1985–1987	Whitley Bay		
1987–1992	Barrow		
1992–199?	Whitley Bay		
- * Club domestic league appearances and goals

Robert George Vincent (born 23 November 1962) is an English former professional footballer who played as a forward for Sunderland.
