= Mats Johansson (footballer) =

Swedish footballer

Personal information
- Date of birth: 28 May 1962 (age 64)
- Position: Goalkeeper

Youth career
- Matfors IF

Senior career*
Years	Team	Apps	(Gls)
1981–1988	IFK Norrköping		
1989	Matfors IF		
1990–1991	Örebro SK		
1992–1993	Degerfors IF		
1995	IFK Eskilstuna		
1998	KB Karlskoga FF		
- * Club domestic league appearances and goals

Mats Johansson (born 28 May 1962) is a Swedish retired football goalkeeper.

Johansson played top-flight football for three different Swedish clubs (IFK Norrköping, Örebro SK and Degerfors IF), and won the Swedish cup twice; in 1988 with Norrköping and in 1993 with Degerfors.
