= Aleksandr Podolyak =

Russian footballer

Personal information
- Full name: Aleksandr Ivanovich Podolyak
- Date of birth: 5 January 1962 (age 64)
- Place of birth: Kursk, Russian SFSR
- Height: 1.78 m (5 ft 10 in)
- Positions: Midfielder; forward

Youth career
- DYuSSh-4 Kursk

Senior career*
Years	Team	Apps	(Gls)
1983–1987	FC Avangard Kursk	122	(23)
1988	FC Kuban Krasnodar	18	(1)
1988	FC Lokomotiv Moscow	6	(0)
1989	FC Avangard Kursk	21	(4)
1989–1990	FC Kuban Krasnodar	28	(3)
1990	FC Kotayk	29	(6)
1991	FC Fakel Voronezh	10	(0)
1991–1992	FC Kuban Krasnodar	48	(0)
1992	FC Niva Slavyansk-na-Kubani	1	(1)
1992–1993	PFC Nyva Vinnytsia	3	(0)
- * Club domestic league appearances and goals

Aleksandr Ivanovich Podolyak (Russian: Александр Иванович Подоляк; born 5 January 1962) is a former Russian football player.
