= Mérida, Spain =

Mérida
- Municipality
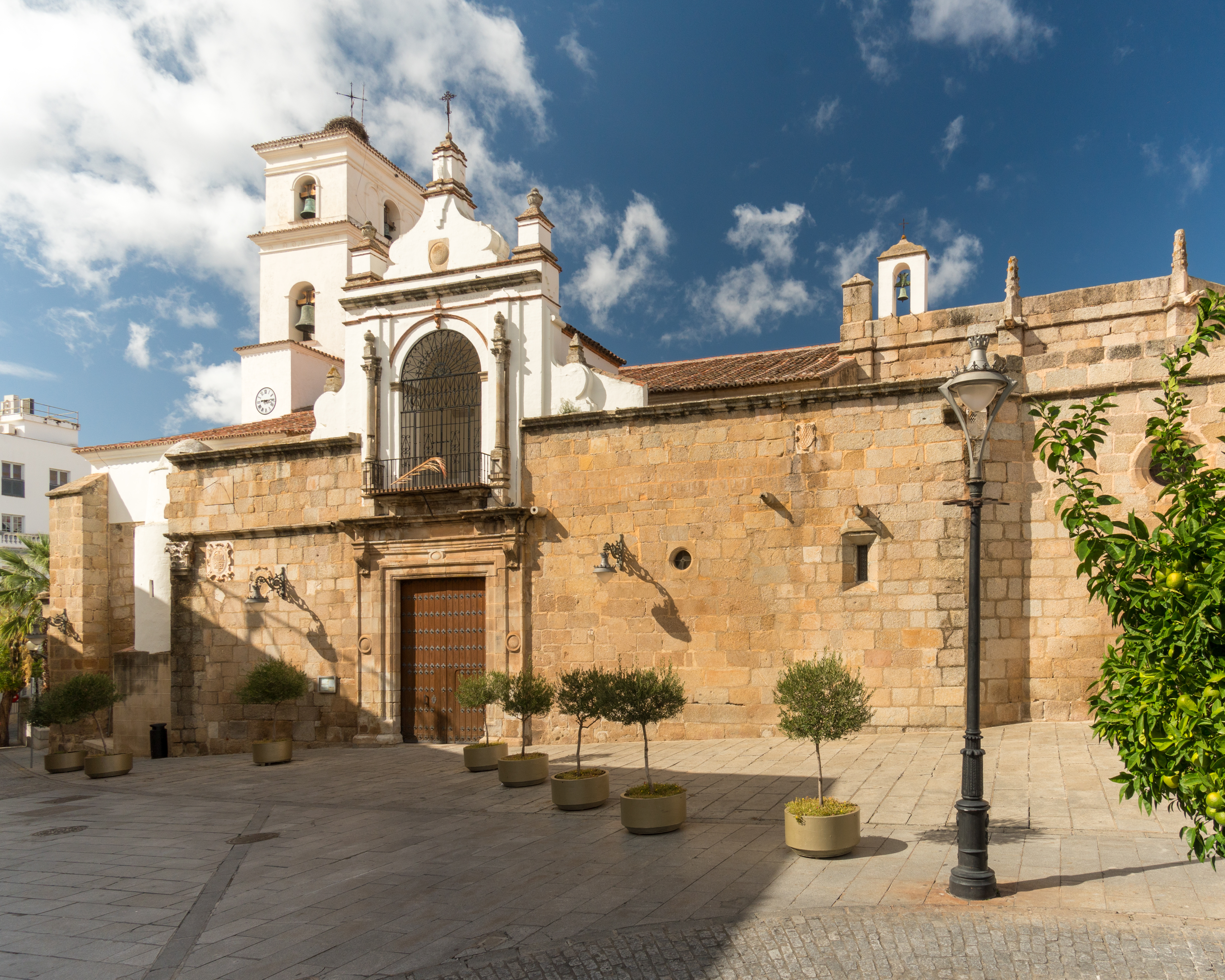
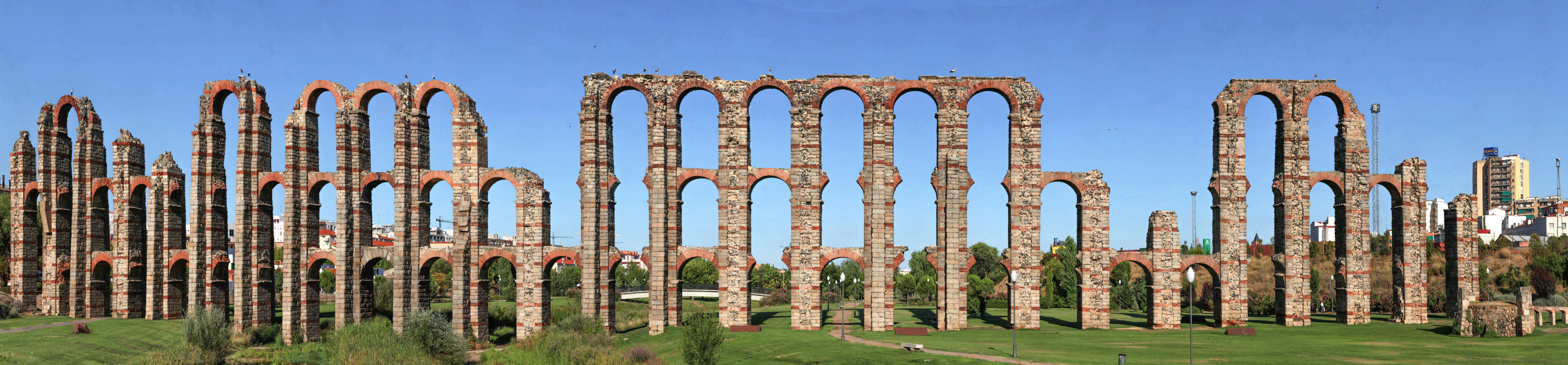
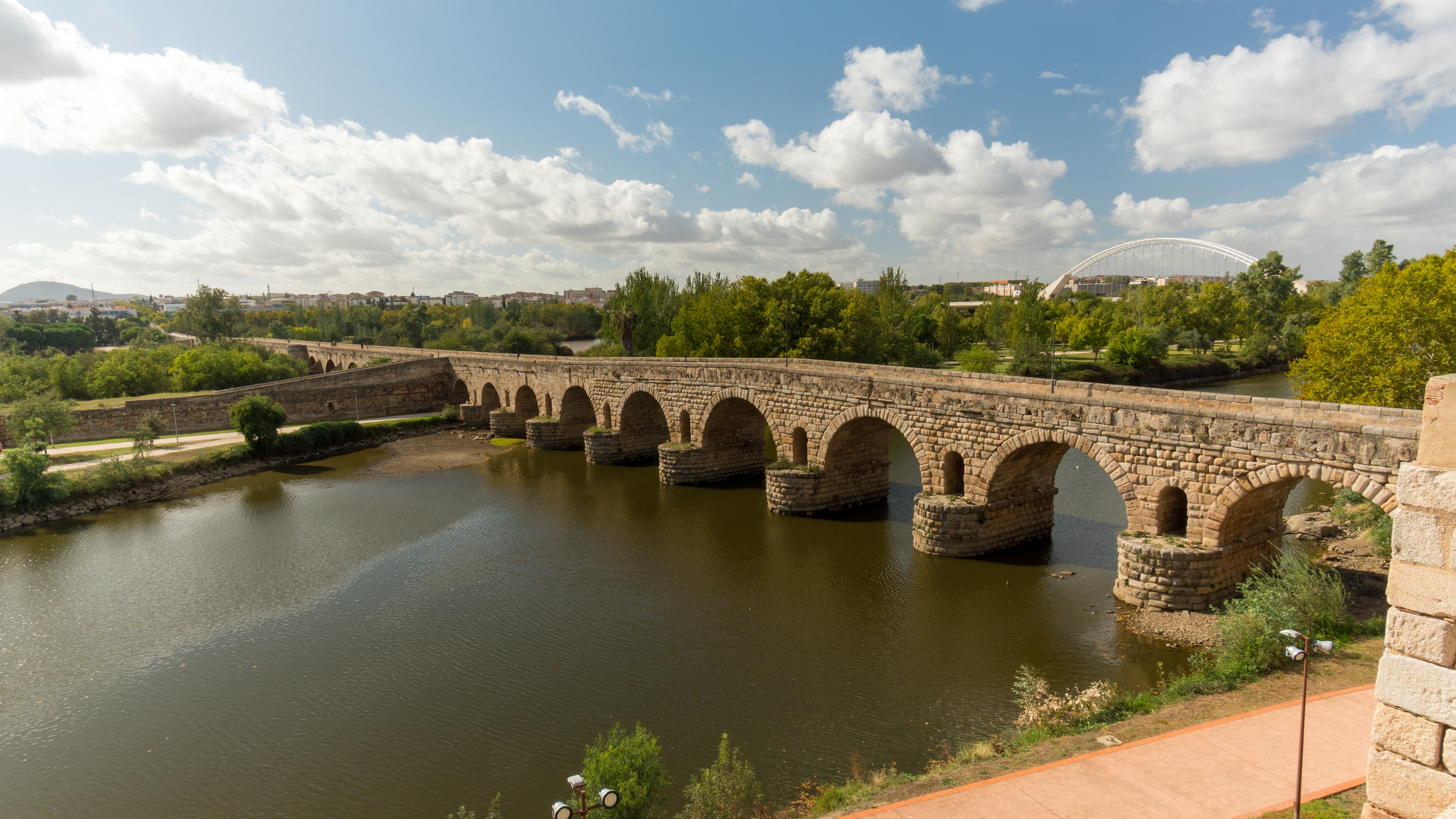
- Roman Theatre Temple of Diana Co-Cathedral Aqueduct of the Miracles Basílica de Santa Eulalia Roman Bridge Lusitania Bridge

- Flag Coat of arms
- Location of Mérida
- Coordinates: 38°54′N 6°20′W
- Country: Spain
- Autonomous community: Extremadura
- Province: Badajoz
- Founded: 25 BC

Government
  - Mayor: Antonio Rodríguez Osuna (2015) (PSOE)

Area
  - Total: 865.6 km^{2} (334.2 sq mi)
- Elevation: 217 m (712 ft)

Population (2025-01-01)
  - Total: 60,225
  - Density: 69.58/km^{2} (180.2/sq mi)
- Demonym: Emeritenses
- Time zone: UTC+1 (CET)
  - Summer (DST): UTC+2 (CEST)
- Postal code: 06800
- Climate: Csa
- Website: Official website

Mérida (Spanish: [ˈmeɾiða]) is a city and municipality of Spain, part of the Province of Badajoz, and capital of the autonomous community of Extremadura. Located in the western-central part of the Iberian Peninsula at 217 metres above sea level, the city is crossed by the Guadiana and Albarregas rivers. The population was 60,119 in 2017.

The primitive settlement was founded by the Roman Empire as Augusta Emerita in the 1st century BCE to allocate discharged soldiers, eventually prospering as one of the largest cities of Hispania and the capital of the province of Lusitania. Its ecclesiastical metropolitan seat was taken away by the Archdiocese of Santiago de Compostela in 1119. Conquered by the Kingdom of León in 1230, shortly before the latter's final integration into the Crown of Castile, it was handed over to the Order of Santiago. On numerous occasions over the course of the middle ages and the Modern Period, it suffered from the effects of warfare due to its location close to the border with Portugal.

== Etymology ==
The place name of Mérida derives from the Latin Emerita, with a meaning of retired or veteran. It is part of the name that the city received after its foundation by the emperor Augustus in 25 BC, Augusta Emerita, colony in which veteran soldiers or emeritus settled.

== History ==
=== Prehistory ===
Mérida has been populated since prehistoric times, as demonstrated by a prestigious hoard of gold jewellery excavated from a girl's grave in 1870. Consisting of two penannular bracelets, an armlet, and a chain of six spiral wire rings, the hoard was acquired by the British Museum.

=== Antiquity ===
The town was founded in 25 BC under the name Emerita Augusta (meaning "veterans of Augustus"), by order of Emperor Augustus, to settle discharged soldiers of the V Alaudae and X Gemina. Established to guard a strategic pass and the Guadiana river bridge, it quickly became one of the most important cities in Roman Hispania. It was the capital of the Lusitania province and later, in the 4th century, served as the capital of the Diocese of Hispania.

Emerita Augusta was also a terminus of the Vía de la Plata (Silver Way), a key Roman route connecting the gold mines near Asturica Augusta with the south of the Iberian Peninsula. Mérida preserves more major Roman monuments than any other city in Spain, including a triumphal arch and the Roman theatre.

Jewish historical tradition, as recorded in Abraham ibn Daud's Sefer ha-Qabbala (a 12th-century source) holds that a group of noble Jewish exiles arrived in Mérida following the destruction of Jerusalem in 70 AD. One of these exiles, Baruch, a silk craftsman, is described as the progenitor of the influential Albalia family of medieval Córdoba.

In 409, during the invasion of Iberia, the city became the capital of the short-lived Kingdom of the Alans under King Attaces. His death in 418 in battle against the Visigoths led to the city's absorption into the neighboring Vandal kingdom. In 469, it was taken by the Visigoths and remained an important city in the Visigothic Kingdom.

=== Middle Ages ===
In 713, Mérida was conquered by the Umayyad Caliphate under Musa ibn Nusayr and became the capital of the Cora of Mérida. The Arabs reused and expanded many Roman buildings, notably the Alcazaba fortress. In the 9th century, the Mozarabs of Mérida frequently rebelled against the Caliphate, contributing to the city's gradual decline. During the Fitna of al-Andalus, Mérida became part of the Taifa of Badajoz.

In the early 13th century, under Almohad control, Mérida supported the rival leader Ibn Hud. In 1230, it was reconquered by Alfonso IX of León and returned to Christian rule. The city then became the seat of the priory of San Marcos de León of the Order of Santiago. A period of recovery began in the 15th century following the unification of the crowns of Aragon and Castile, aided by Alonso de Cárdenas, Grand Master of the Order.

=== Modern times ===
In 1720, Mérida became the capital of the Intendencia of Mérida. The city is also located along the Vía de la Plata route of the Camino de Santiago, offering an alternative to the more widely known French Way.

During the Napoleonic Wars, many of Mérida's historic monuments were damaged or destroyed. In the aftermath, the city developed as a railway hub and underwent significant industrialization.

On 10 August 1936, during the Spanish Civil War, Mérida was captured by Nationalist forces in the Battle of Mérida. The Nationalists carried out a harsh repression in the conquered territory.

In modern times, Mérida became the capital of the autonomous community of Extremadura in 1983. It also serves as the ecclesiastical seat of the Archdiocese of Mérida-Badajoz. The city's archaeological site was declared a UNESCO World Heritage Site in 1993.

The current mayor (since 2015) is Antonio Rodríguez Osuna of the Spanish Socialist Workers' Party.

== Climate ==
Mérida has a cold semi-arid climate with Mediterranean (Csa) influences (Köppen: BSk; Trewartha: BSak), due to the proximity of the Portuguese coast. The winters are mild, with minimum temperature rarely below 0 °C (32 °F), and summers are hot with maximum temperatures occasionally exceeding 40 °C (104 °F).

Precipitation is normally between 300 and 400 mm (11.8 and 15.7 in) annually. The months with most rainfall are November and December. Summers are dry, and in Mérida, as in the rest of southern Spain, cycles of drought are common, ranging in duration from 2 to 5 years.

In autumn the climate is more changeable than in the rest of the year. Storms occur with some frequency, but the weather is often dry.

Both humidity and winds are low. However, there is frequent fog, especially in the central months of autumn and winter.

Climate data for Mérida WMO ID: 08331; Climate ID: 4410X; coordinates 38°54′57″N 06°23′08″W; elevation: 228 m (748 ft); (1991–2020), extremes (1989–present)
Month	Jan	Feb	Mar	Apr	May	Jun	Jul	Aug	Sep	Oct	Nov	Dec	Year
Record high °C (°F)	23.4 (74.1)	25.3 (77.5)	30.6 (87.1)	36.9 (98.4)	39.4 (102.9)	44.0 (111.2)	44.8 (112.6)	46.4 (115.5)	44.7 (112.5)	36.6 (97.9)	27.3 (81.1)	22.6 (72.7)	46.4 (115.5)
Mean daily maximum °C (°F)	14.3 (57.7)	16.1 (61.0)	19.8 (67.6)	22.4 (72.3)	26.8 (80.2)	32.3 (90.1)	35.0 (95.0)	35.3 (95.5)	31.1 (88.0)	25.2 (77.4)	18.6 (65.5)	14.8 (58.6)	24.3 (75.7)
Daily mean °C (°F)	9.0 (48.2)	10.3 (50.5)	13.3 (55.9)	15.6 (60.1)	19.4 (66.9)	24.1 (75.4)	26.1 (79.0)	26.6 (79.9)	23.3 (73.9)	18.7 (65.7)	12.9 (55.2)	9.8 (49.6)	17.4 (63.3)
Mean daily minimum °C (°F)	3.7 (38.7)	4.3 (39.7)	6.7 (44.1)	8.9 (48.0)	12.0 (53.6)	15.8 (60.4)	17.2 (63.0)	17.8 (64.0)	15.4 (59.7)	12.1 (53.8)	7.2 (45.0)	4.7 (40.5)	10.5 (50.9)
Record low °C (°F)	−10.0 (14.0)	−6.9 (19.6)	−4.9 (23.2)	1.0 (33.8)	2.3 (36.1)	8.0 (46.4)	11.0 (51.8)	10.2 (50.4)	8.8 (47.8)	2.7 (36.9)	−1.7 (28.9)	−4.7 (23.5)	−10.0 (14.0)
Average precipitation mm (inches)	44.8 (1.76)	37.0 (1.46)	40.8 (1.61)	36.7 (1.44)	31.0 (1.22)	8.5 (0.33)	4.2 (0.17)	5.9 (0.23)	19.2 (0.76)	60.8 (2.39)	51.1 (2.01)	41.6 (1.64)	381.7 (15.03)
Average precipitation days (≥ 1 mm)	6.4	5.7	6.0	6.4	4.8	1.3	0.5	0.9	2.6	6.4	7.1	6.0	54.1
Average relative humidity (%) (daily average)	80	70	65	62	53	48	47	46	52	64	75	81	62
Source: Agencia Estatal de Meteorología (AEMET OpenData)

== Annual Events ==
=== Emerita Lvdica ===
Each year the city holds a week-long event to celebrate the Roman history of the area. The "games" (lvdica) include scheduled events throughout the city during the day and into Mérida's comfortable evenings. They include parades, brightly-costumed attendees, fiercely-armored gladiators, mock battles in the ancient amphitheater, plus some simulation of the daily life in that period. The schedule is roughly the last week of May until the first weekend in June and should be checked in advance by visiting the city's schedule of events page.

== Culture ==
=== Main sights ===
Among the remaining Roman monuments are:

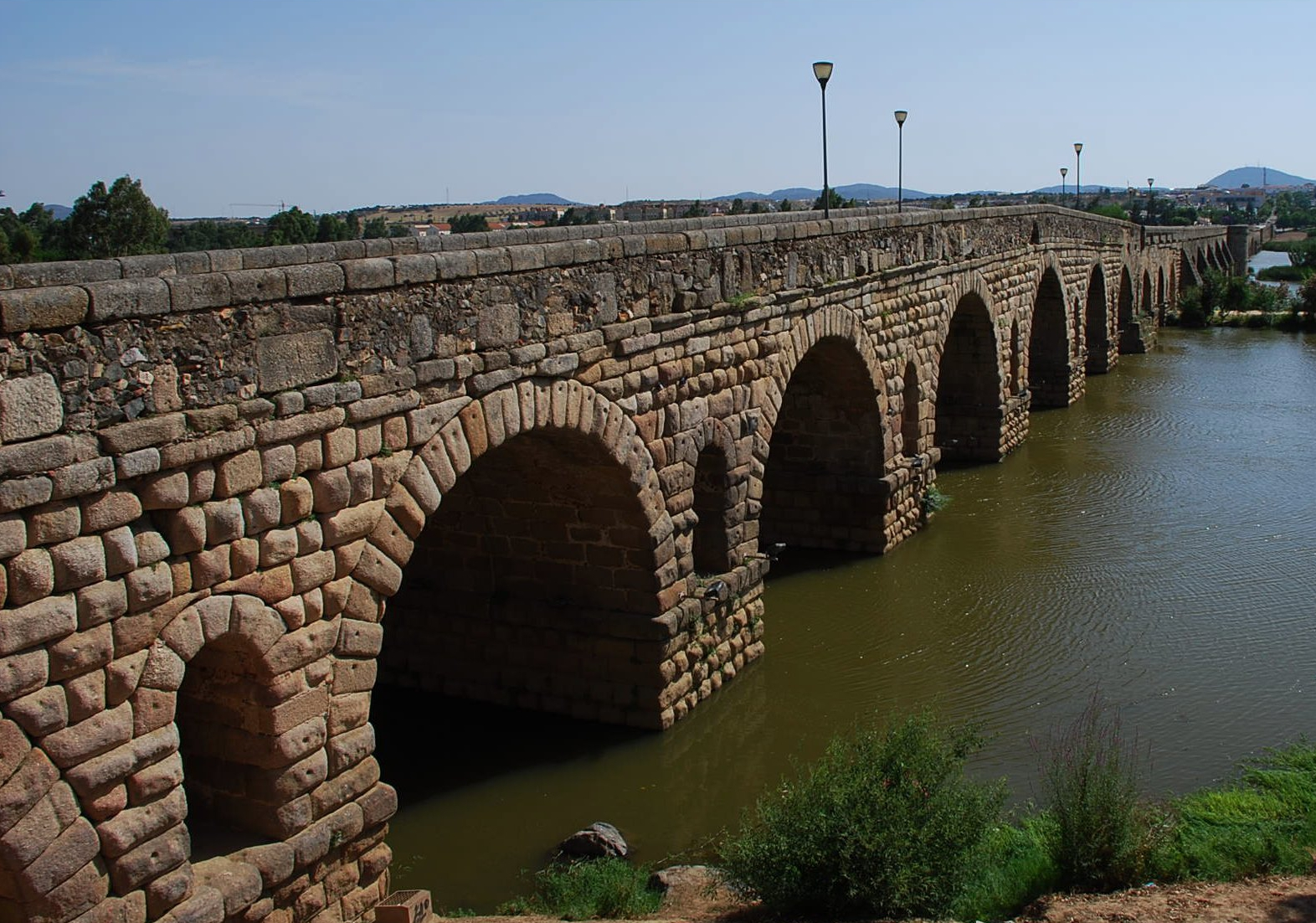
Puente Romano

The Puente Romano, a bridge over the Guadiana River that is still used by pedestrians, and the longest of all existing Roman bridges. Annexed is a fortification (the Alcazaba), built by the Muslim emir Abd ar-Rahman II in 835 on the Roman walls and Roman-Visigothic edifices in the area. The court houses Roman mosaics, while underground is a Visigothic cistern.

- remains of the Forum, including the Temple of Diana, and of the Roman Provincial Forum, including the so-called Arch of Trajan
- remains of the Circus Maximus (1st century BC), one of the best preserved Roman circus buildings

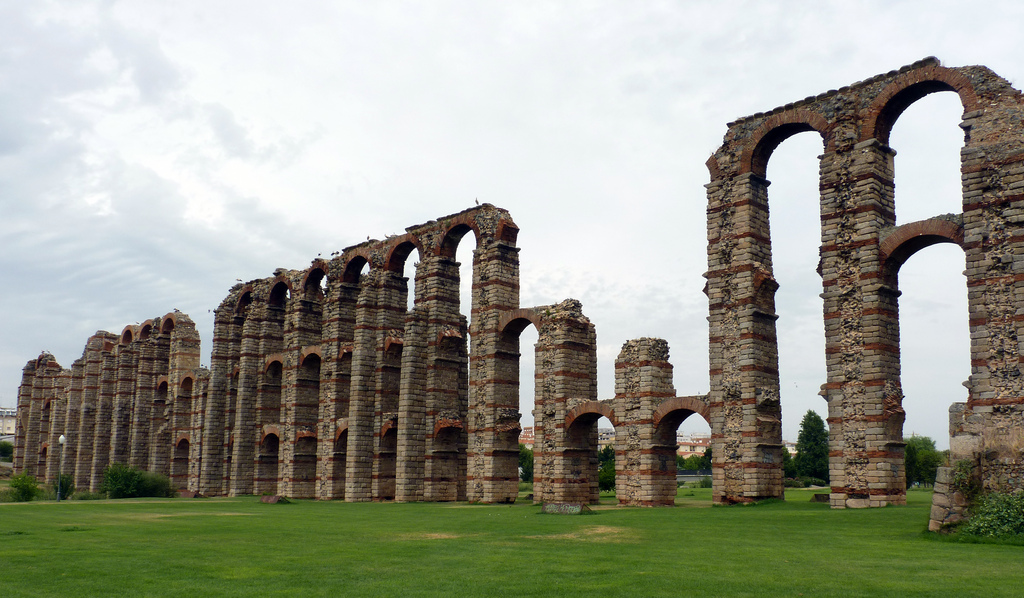
Acueducto de los Milagros

- Acueducto de los Milagros (a Roman aqueduct)
- patrician villa called the Villa Mitreo, with precious mosaic pavements
- Proserpina Dam and Cornalvo Dam, two Roman reservoirs still in use
- the Amphitheatre, and the Roman theatre, where a summer festival of Classical theatre is presented, usually with versions of Greco-Roman classics or modern plays set in ancient times.
- Morerías archaeological site
- National Museum of Roman Art designed by Rafael Moneo
- Church of Santa Eulalia, dating to the 4th century but rebuilt in the 13th century. Its portico reuses parts of an ancient temple of Mars.

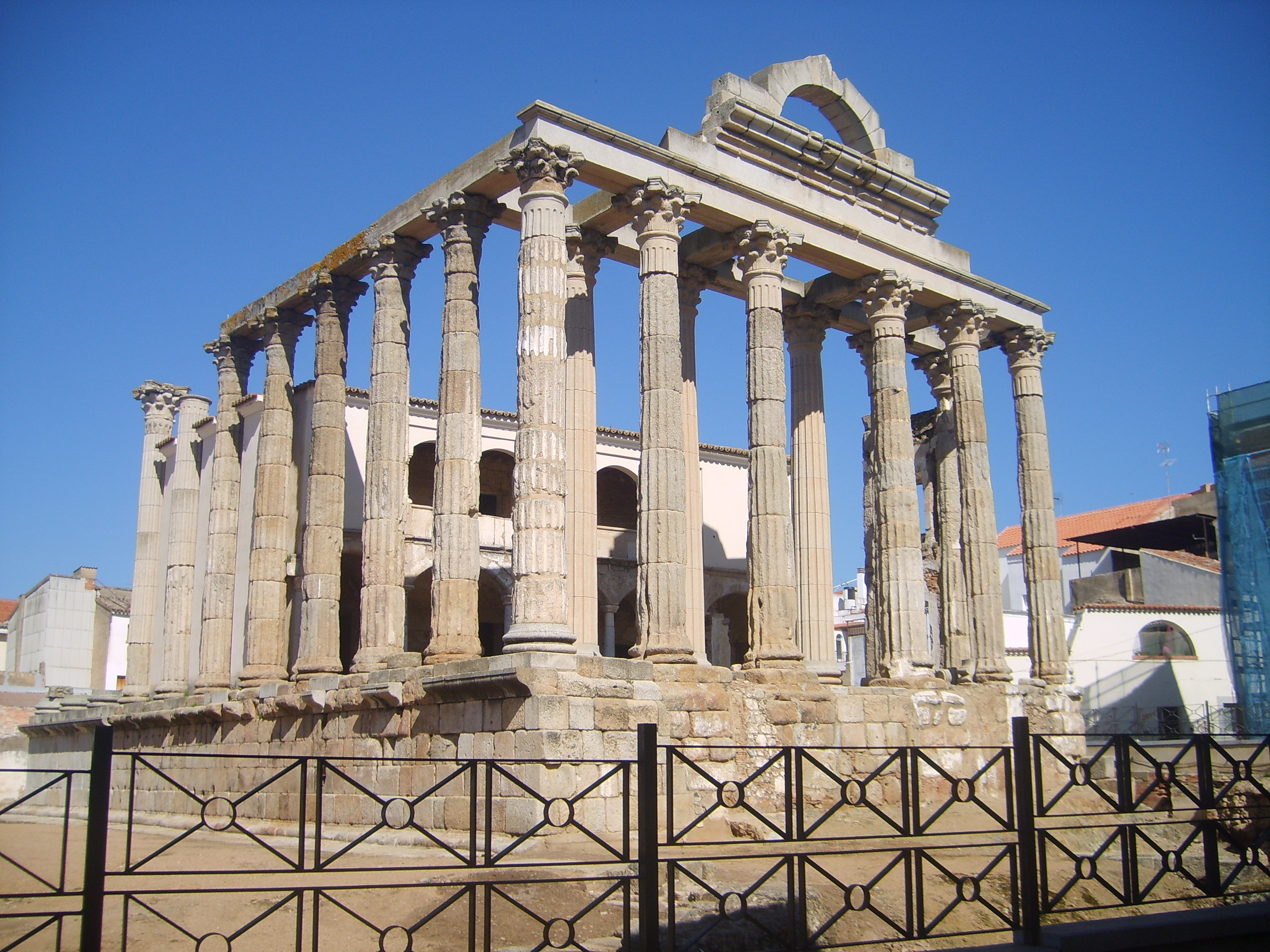
Temple of Diana

Other sights include:

- Cathedral of Saint Mary Major (13th-14th centuries)
- Renaissance Ayuntamiento (Town Hall)
- Church of Santa Clara (17th century)
- Gothic church of Nuestra Señora de la Antigua (15th-16th centuries)
- Baroque church of Nuestra Señora del Carmen (18th century)

Several notable buildings were built more recently, including the Escuela de la Administración Pública (Public Administration College), the Consejerías y Asamblea de Junta de Extremadura (councils and parliament of Extremadura), the Agencía de la Vivienda de Extremadura (Housing Agency of Extremadura), the Biblioteca del Estado (State Library), the Palacio de Congresos y Exposiciones (auditorium), the Factoría de Ocio y Creación Joven (cultural and leisure center for youth), the Complejo Cultural Hernán Cortés (cultural centre), the Ciudad Deportiva (sports city), the Universidad de Mérida (Mérida University), the Confederación Hidrografica del Guadiana (Guadiana Hydrographic Confederation designed by Rafael Moneo), the Lusitania Bridge over the Guadiana River designed by Santiago Calatrava), the Palacio de Justicia (Justice Hall), etc.

== Sport ==
AD Mérida is the principal football team of the city, founded in 2013 as a successor to Mérida UD, which itself was a successor to CP Mérida. The last of these teams played two seasons in Spain's top division, La Liga, in the late 1990s.

All three clubs played at the city's 14,600-capacity Estadio Romano. On 9 September 2009, it hosted the Spanish national team as they defeated Estonia 3–0 to qualify for the 2010 FIFA World Cup, which they went on to win. Mayor of Mérida Ángel Calle said, "We want to use the Estonia match to promote Mérida and Extremadura, we will welcome the players as if they were 21st-century gladiators."

== Transport ==
The nearest airport to the city is Badajoz Airport, located 50 km (31 mi) west of Merida.

== International relations ==
Mérida is twinned with:

- Mérida, Mexico
- Mérida, Venezuela
- Totana, Spain

== Gallery ==
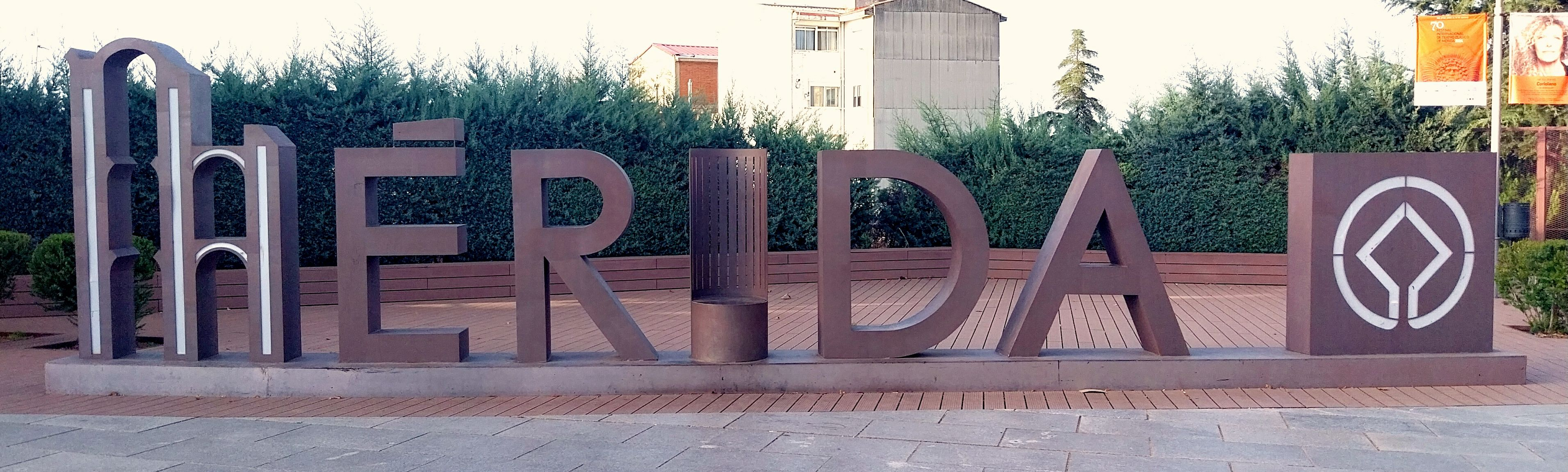
Mérida Letter Art

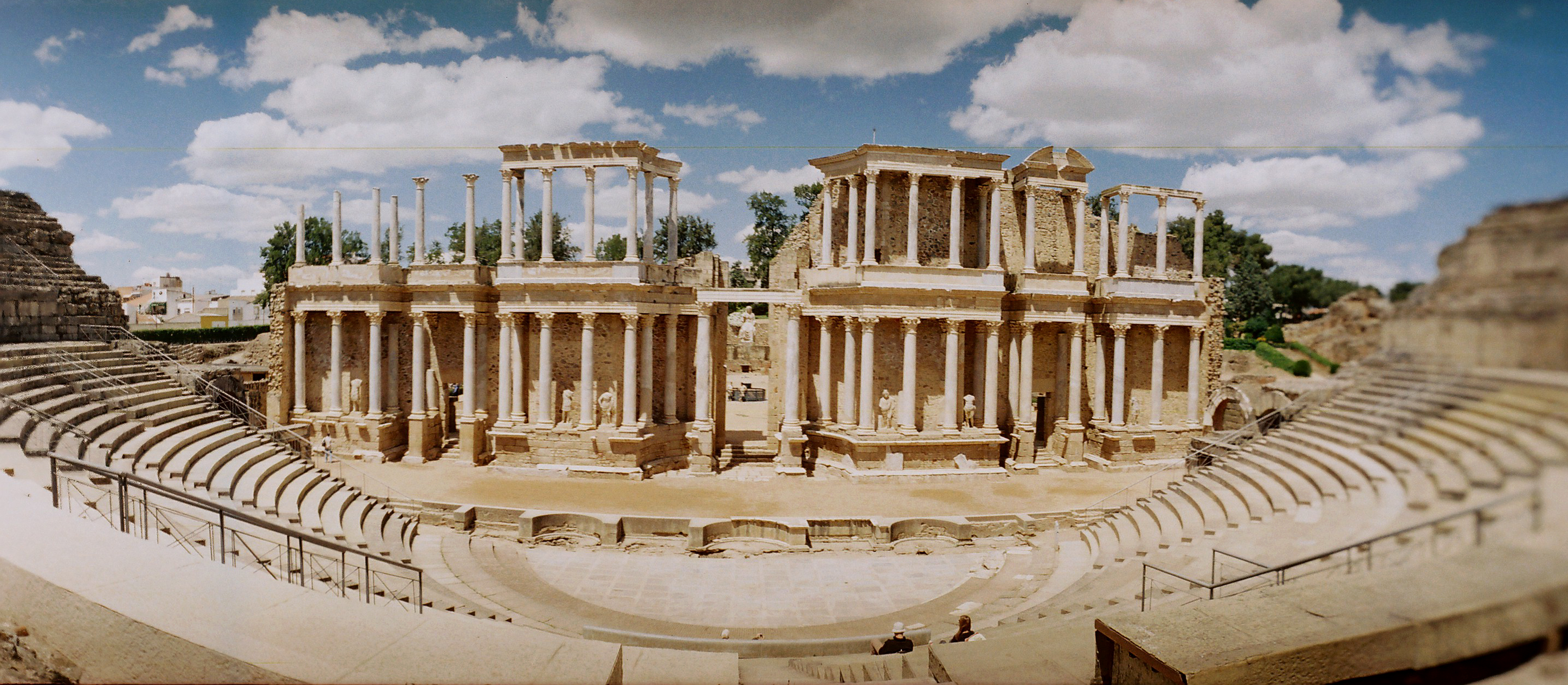
Roman theatre panorama

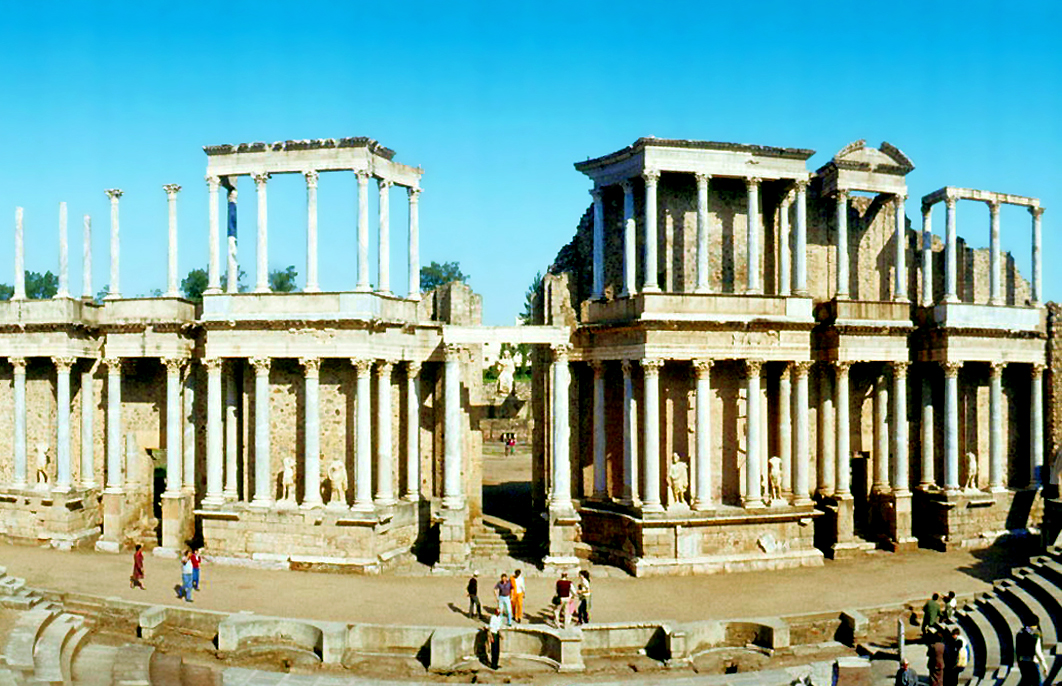
Roman theatre closer view

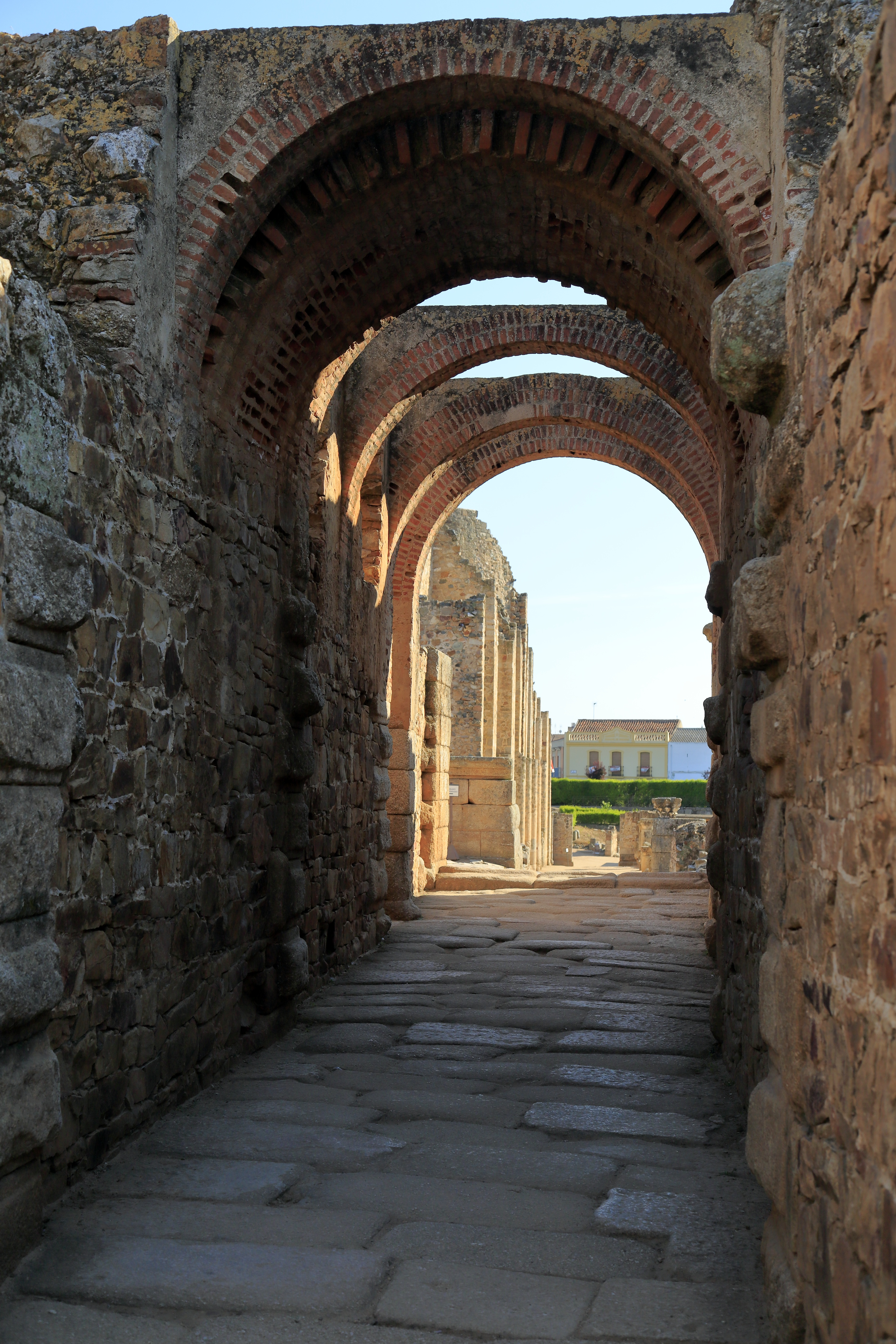
Roman Amphitheatre entrance arch

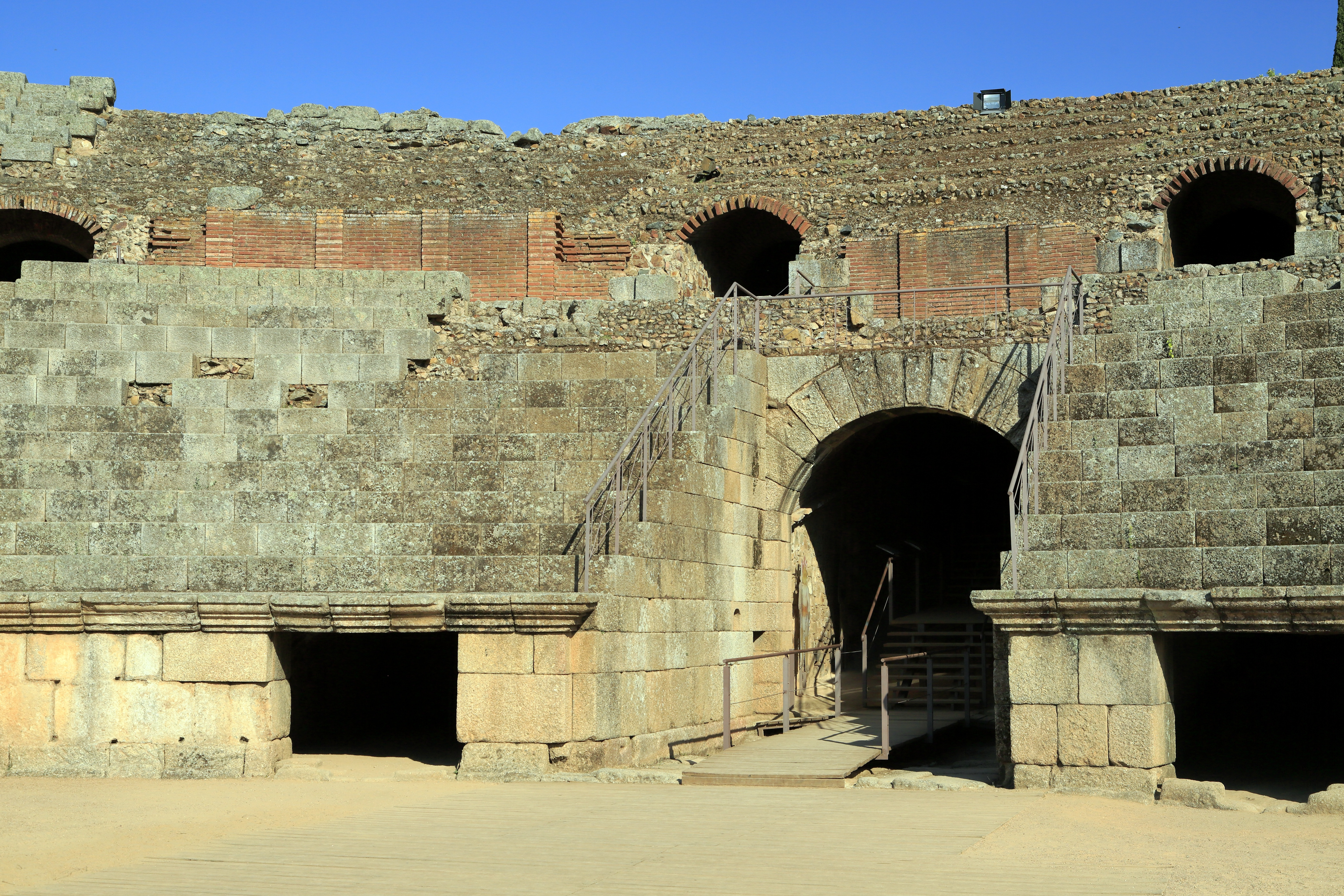
Seating and entrances to Roman Amphitheatre

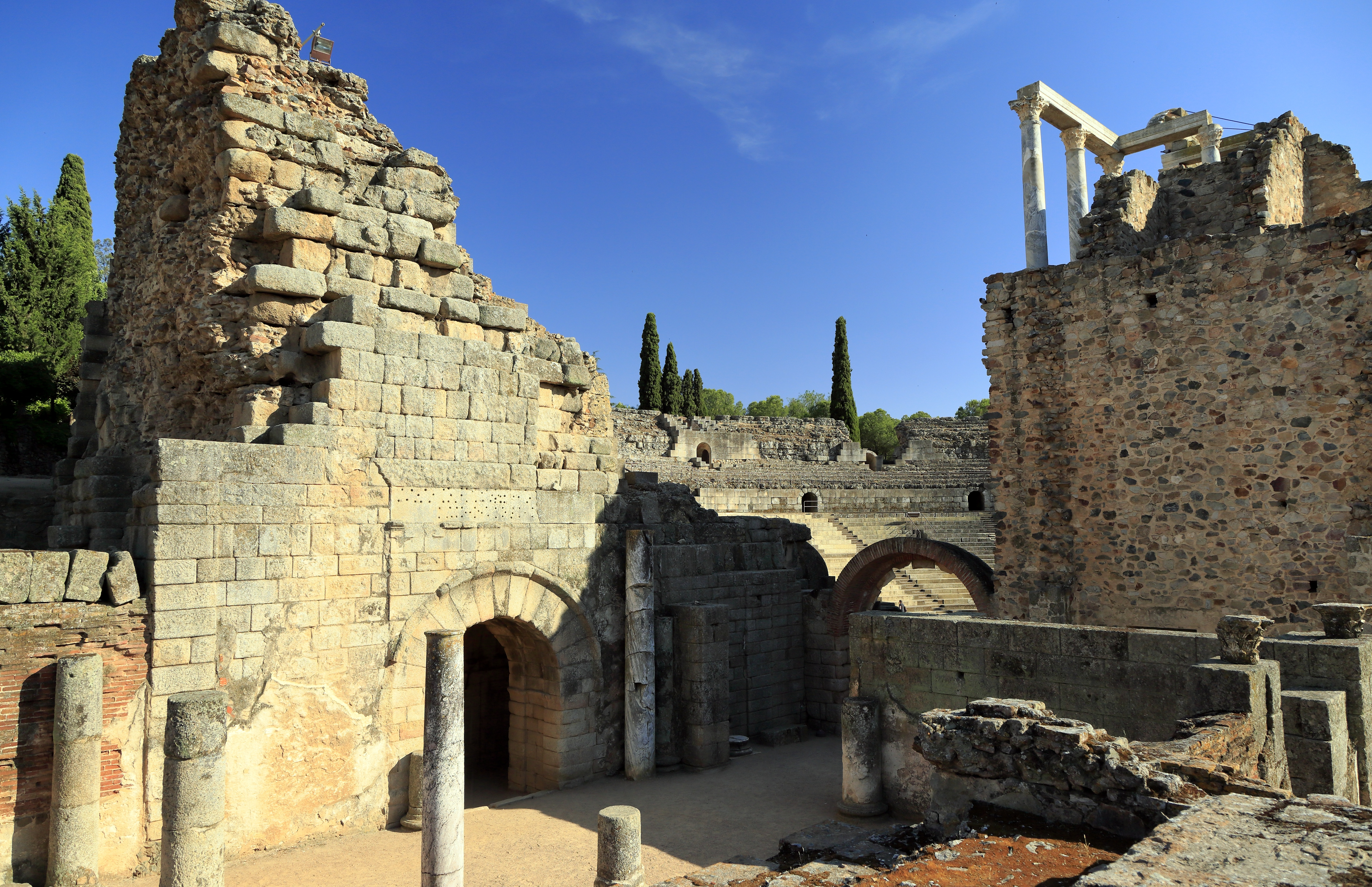
Roman Amphitheatre from different angle

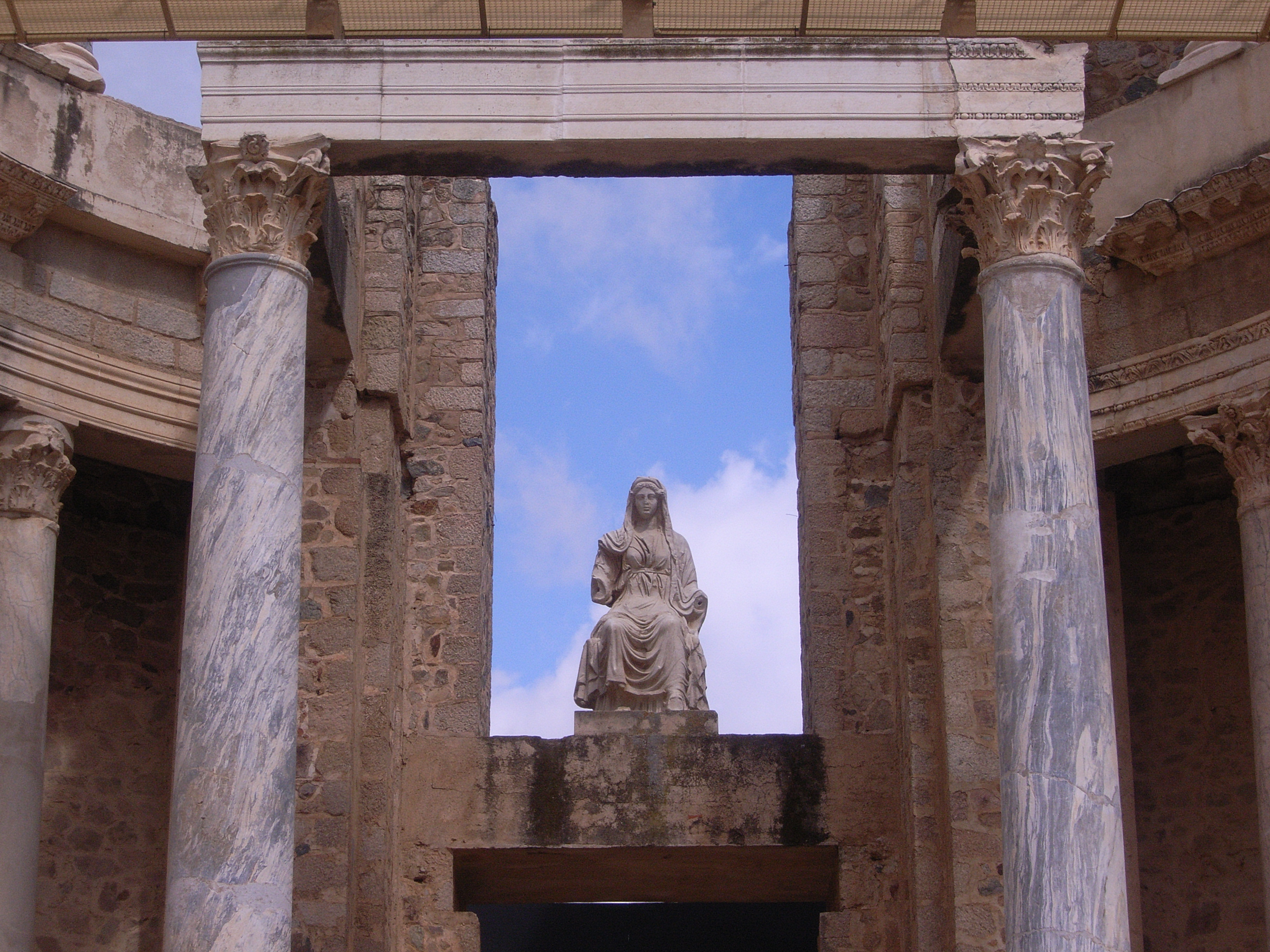
Statue of Ceres in Roman Amphitheatre

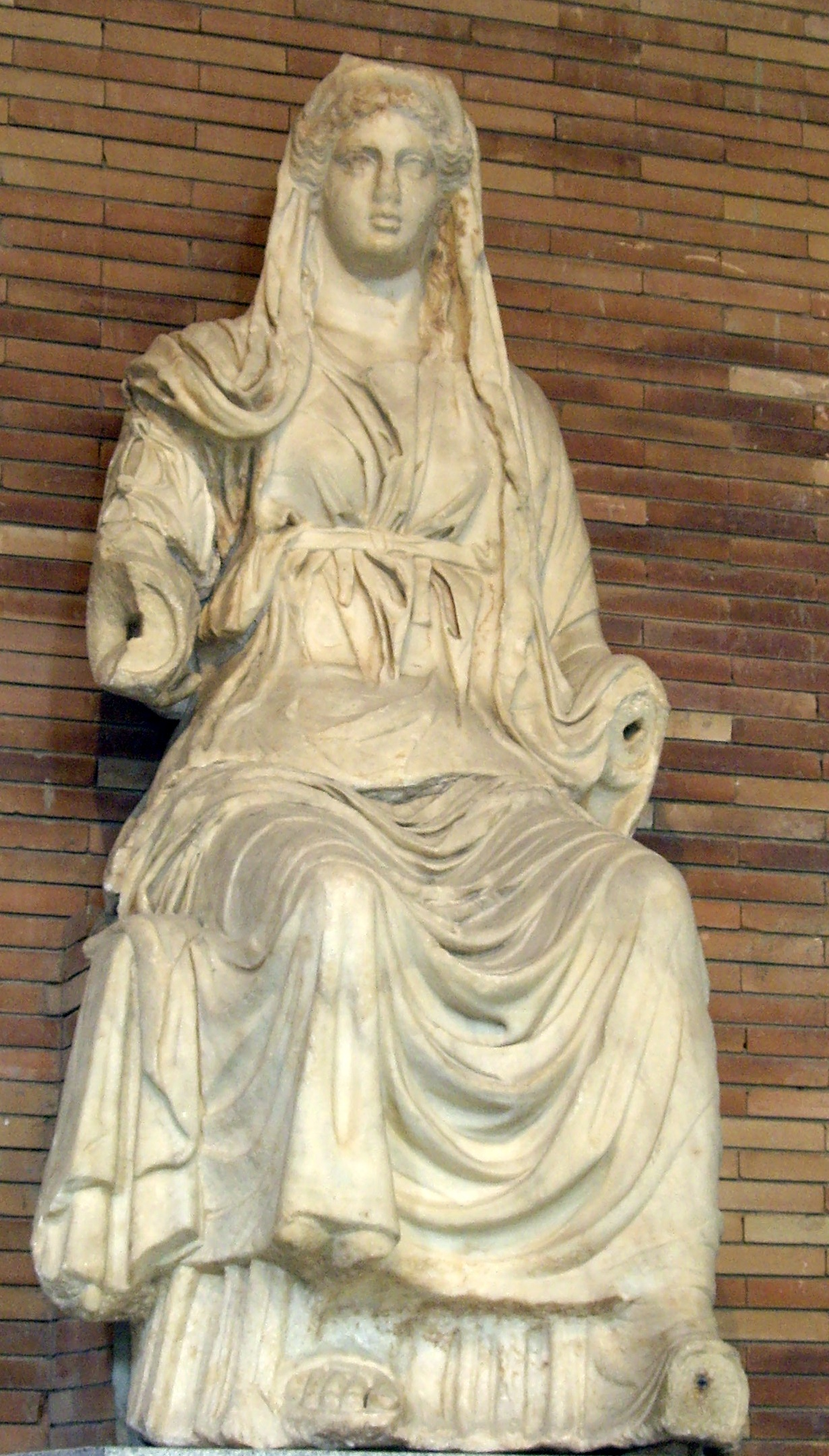
Closeup of the statue of Ceres in the Roman Amphitheatre

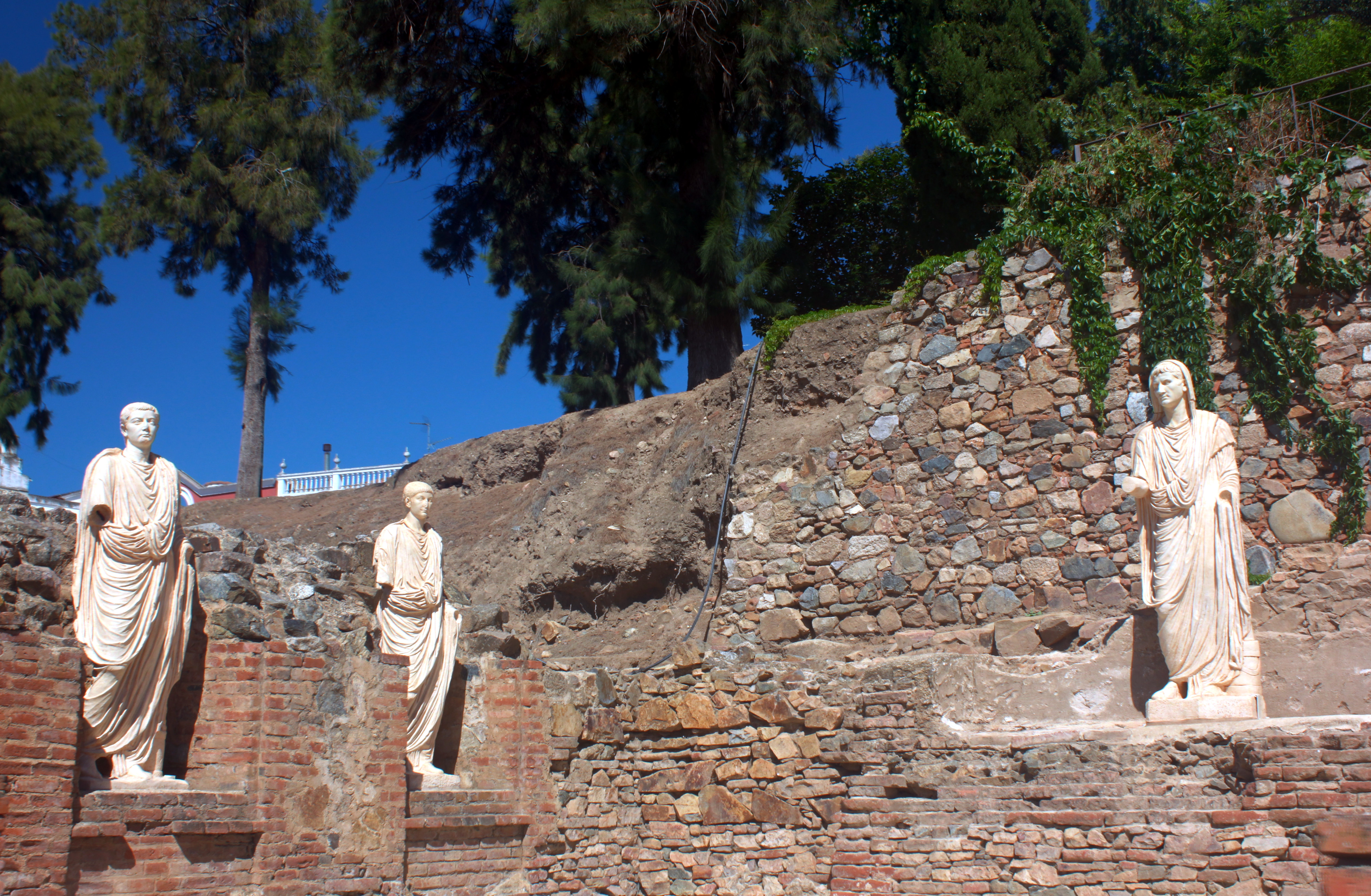
Statues lining the Roman Theatre

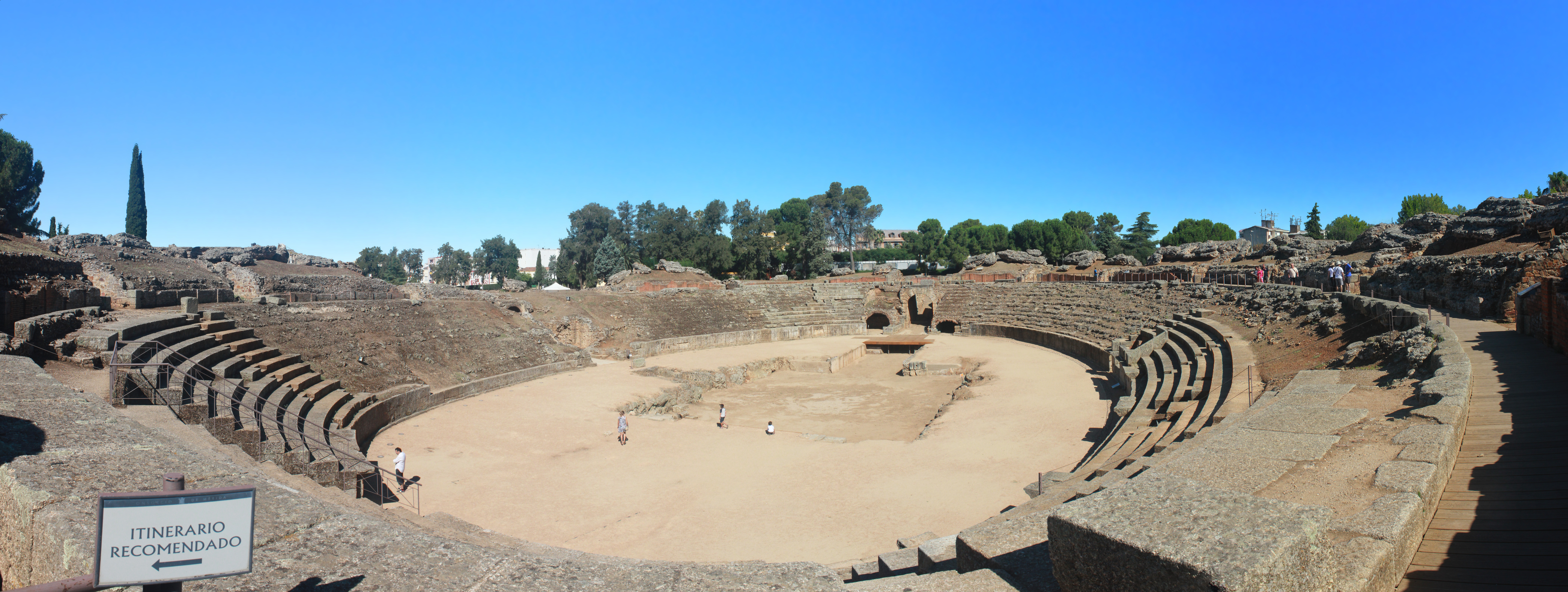
Panorama of the Roman Amphitheatre

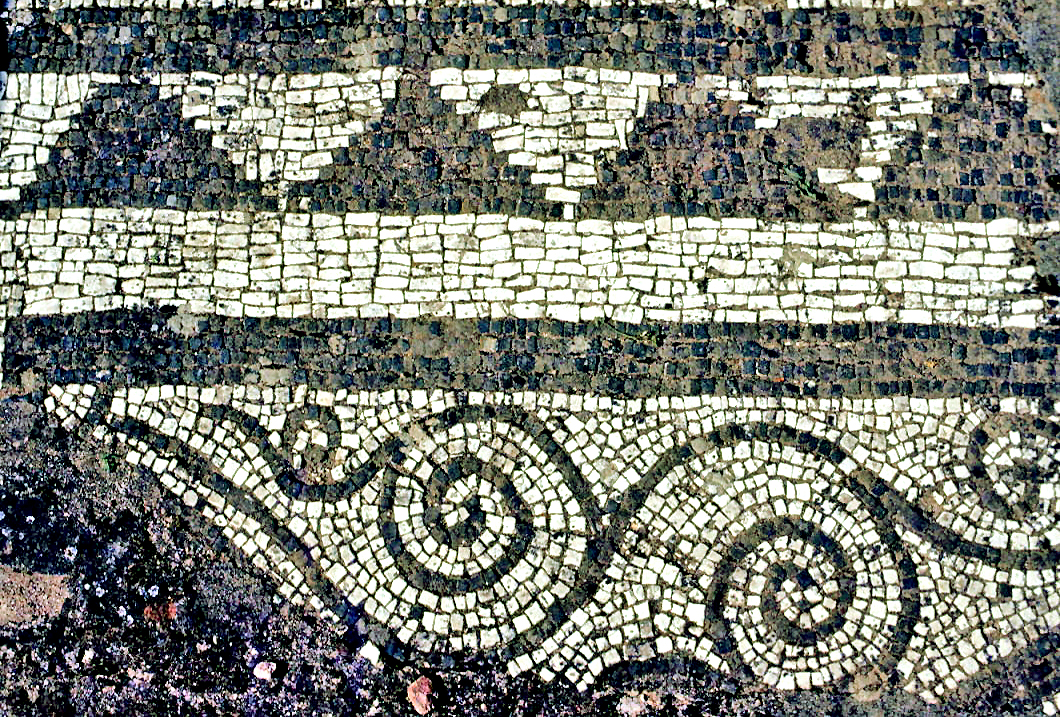
Details of mosaic tile pattern in the Roman Theatre

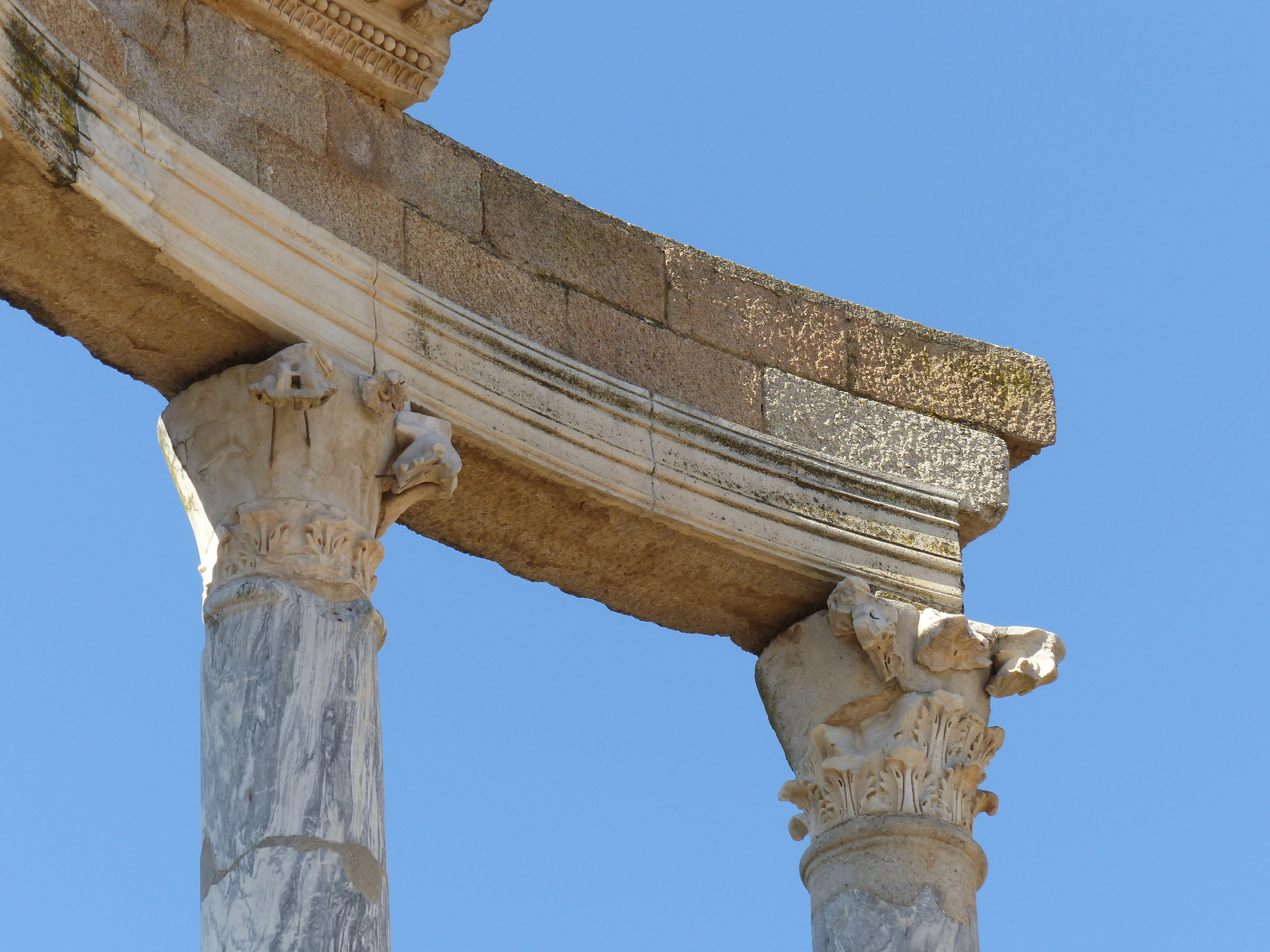
Detail of Roman Columns from the Roman Theatre

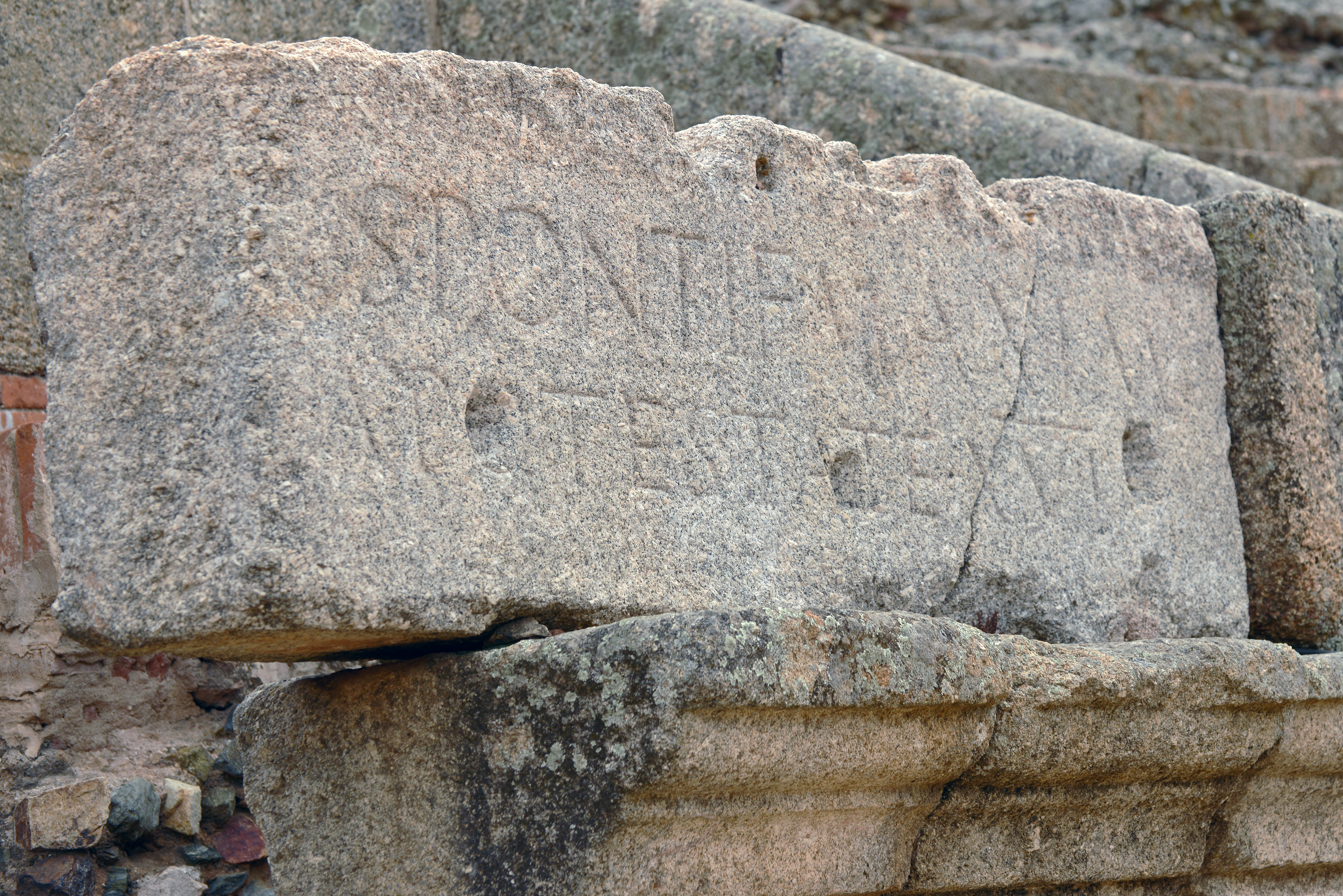
Cornerstone dedicating the Roman Amphitheatre in 8 BC for use in gladiatorial contests and staged beast-hunts

Temple of Diana

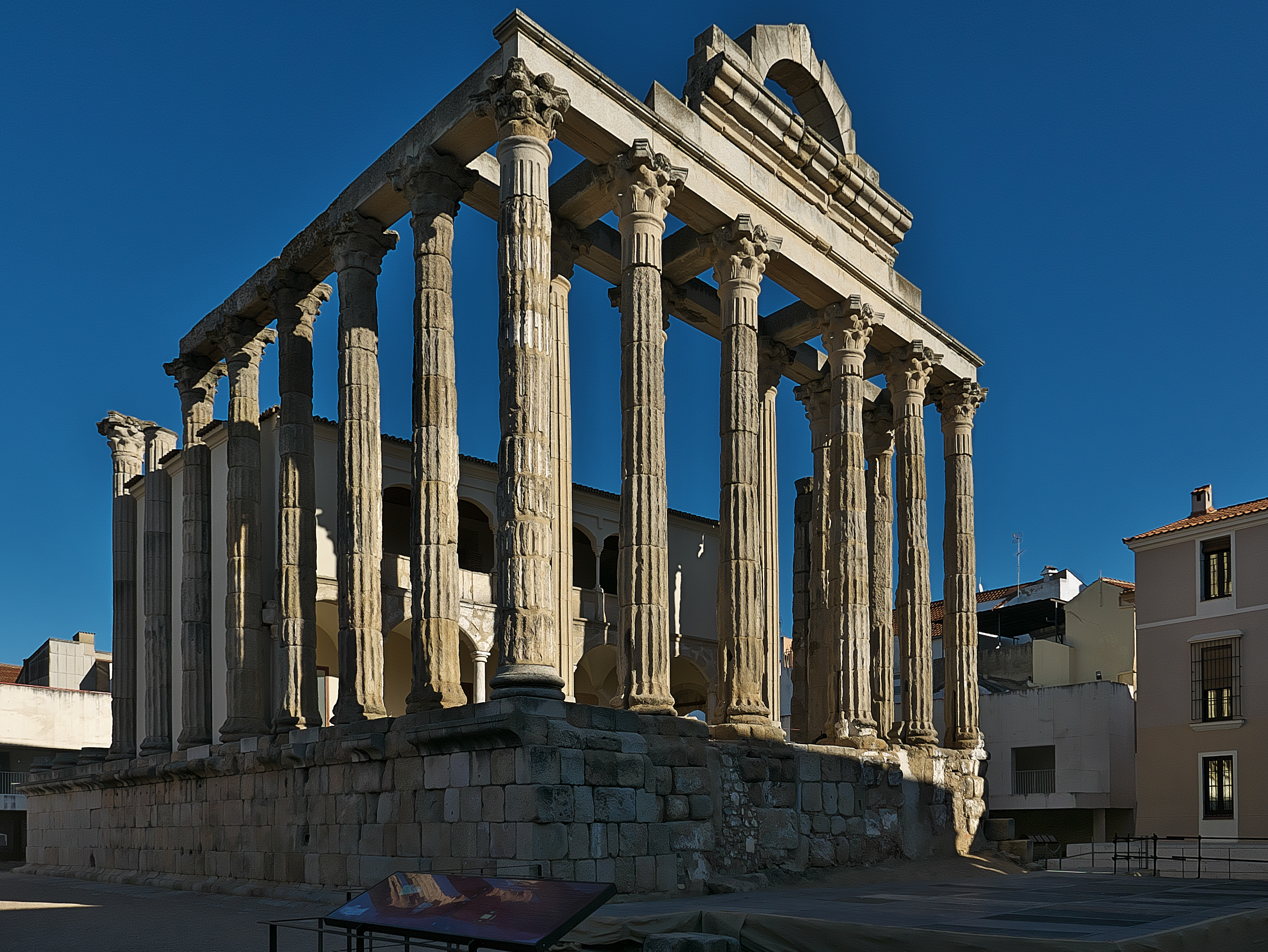
Temple of Diana

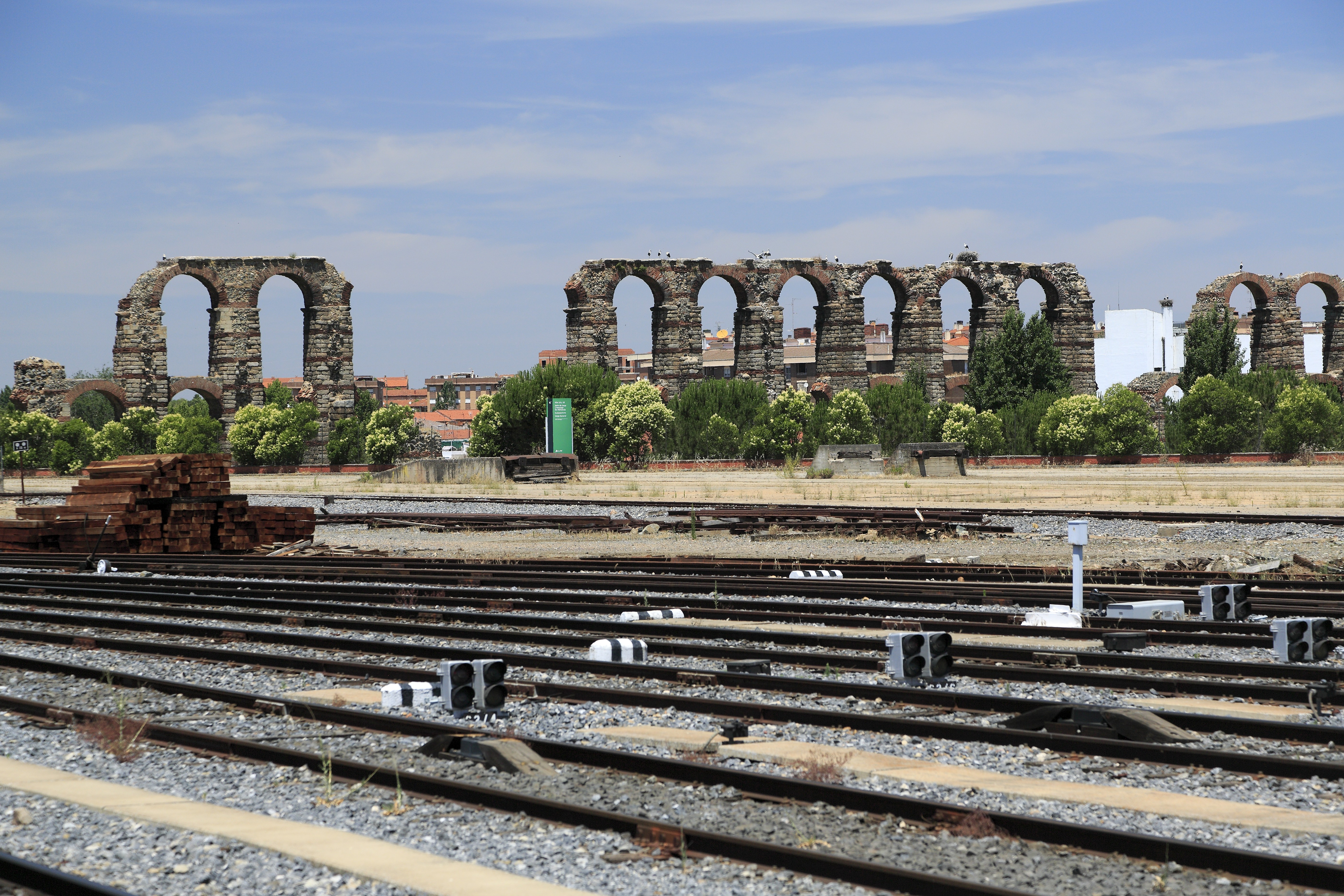
Roman Aqueduct

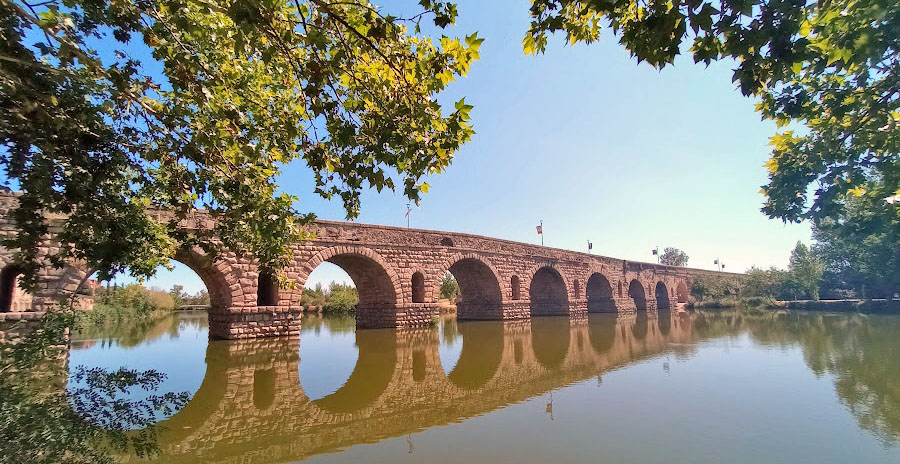
Roman Bridge

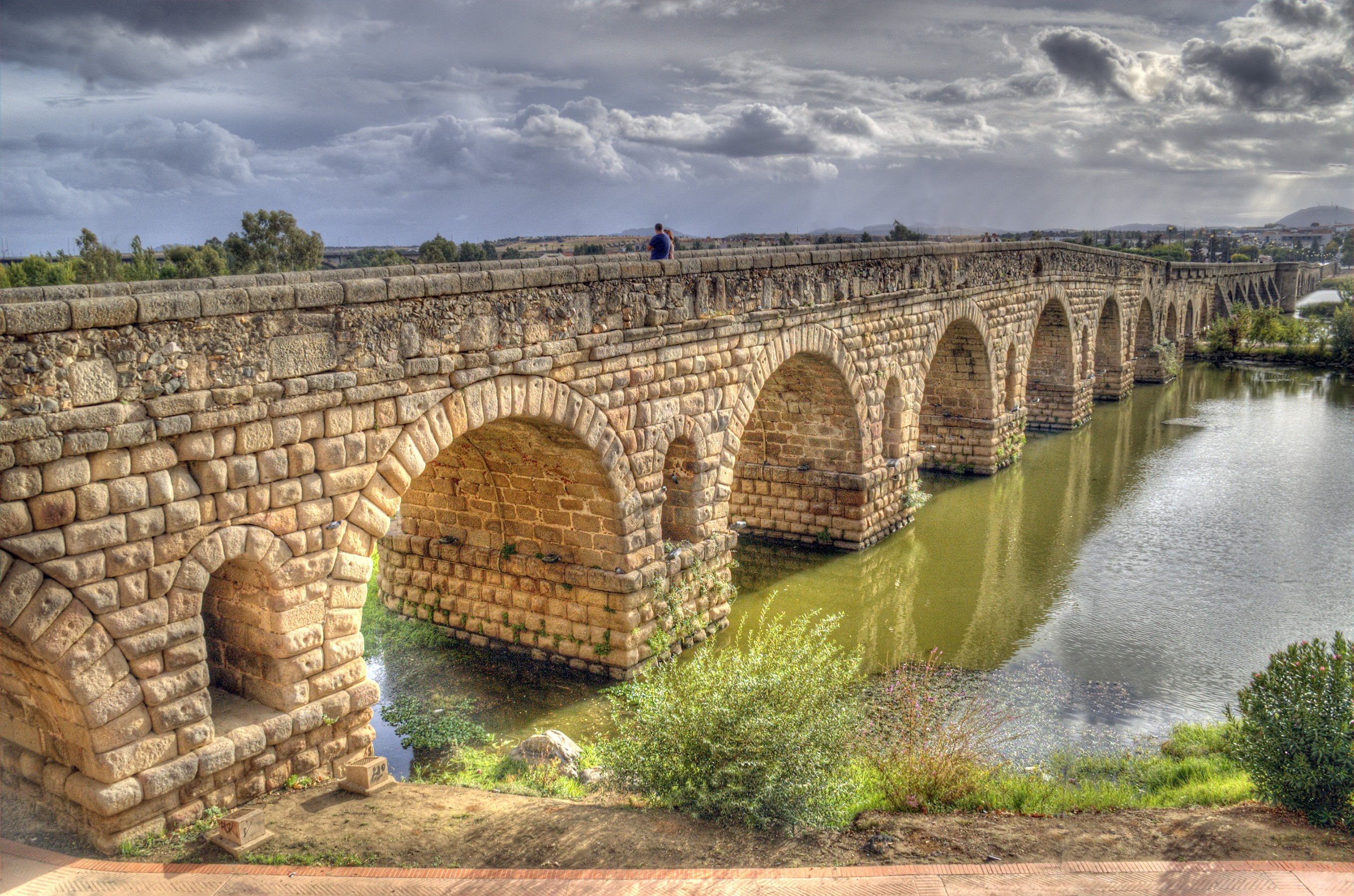
Roman Bridge in Merida

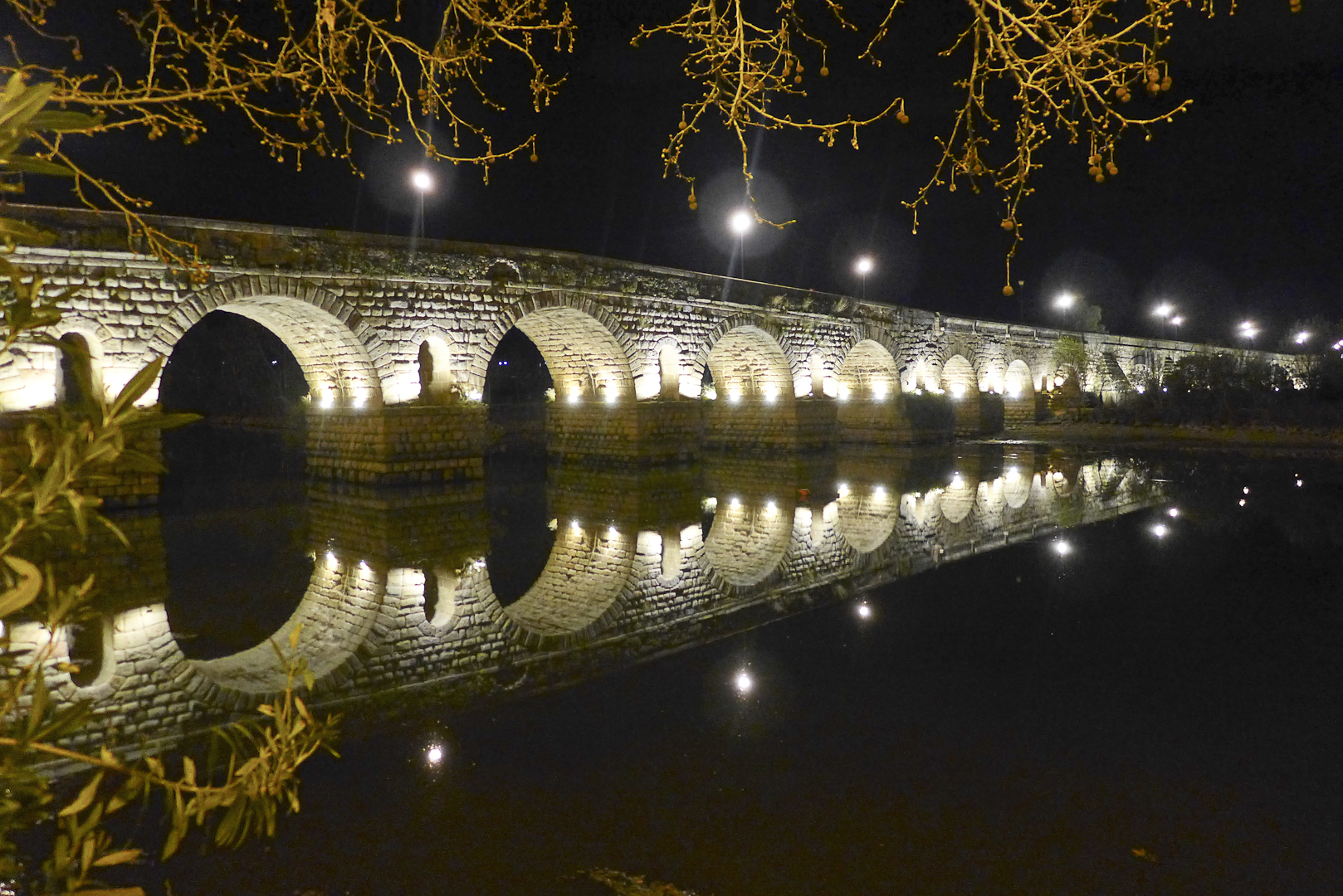
Roman Bridge

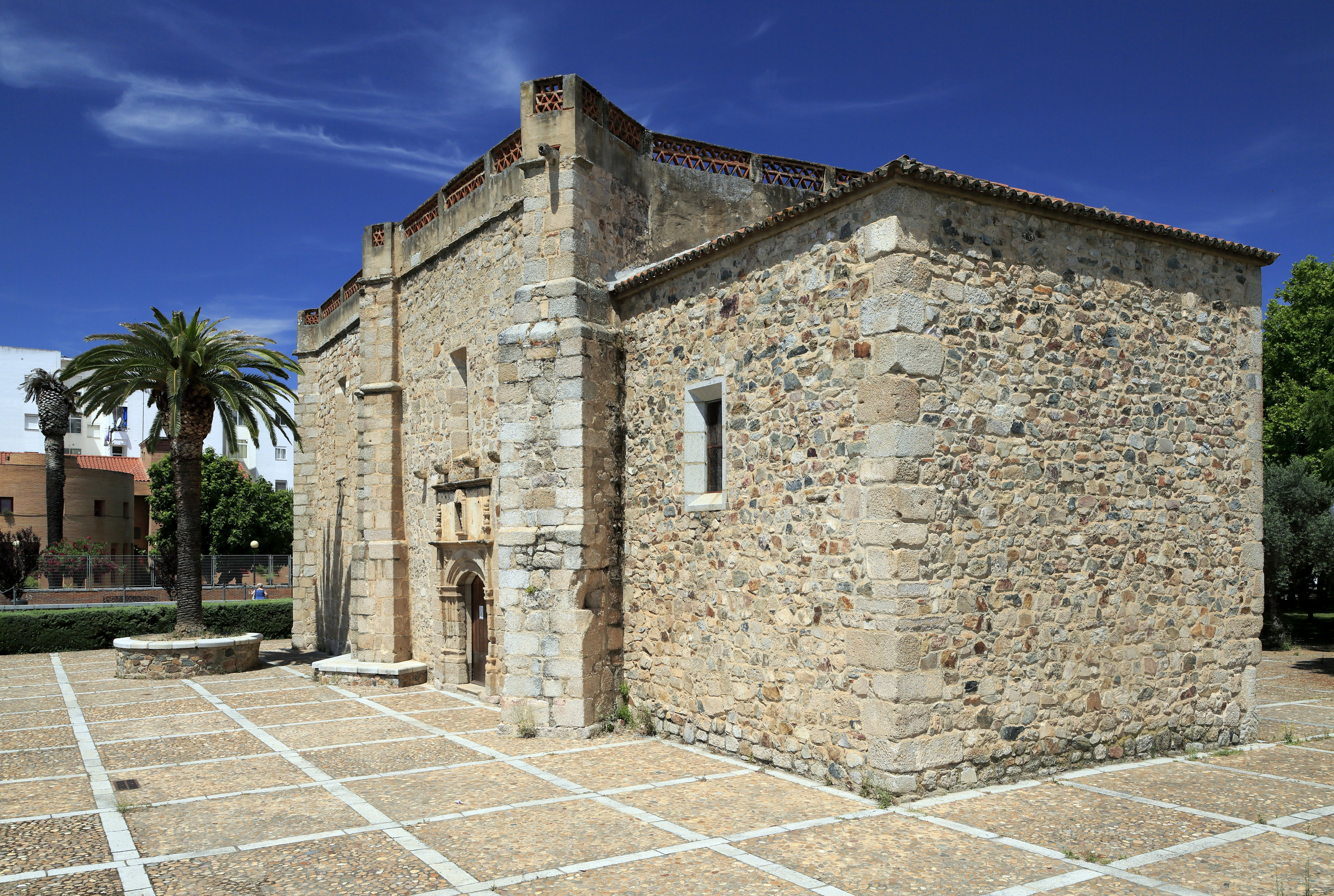
Ancient Hermitage

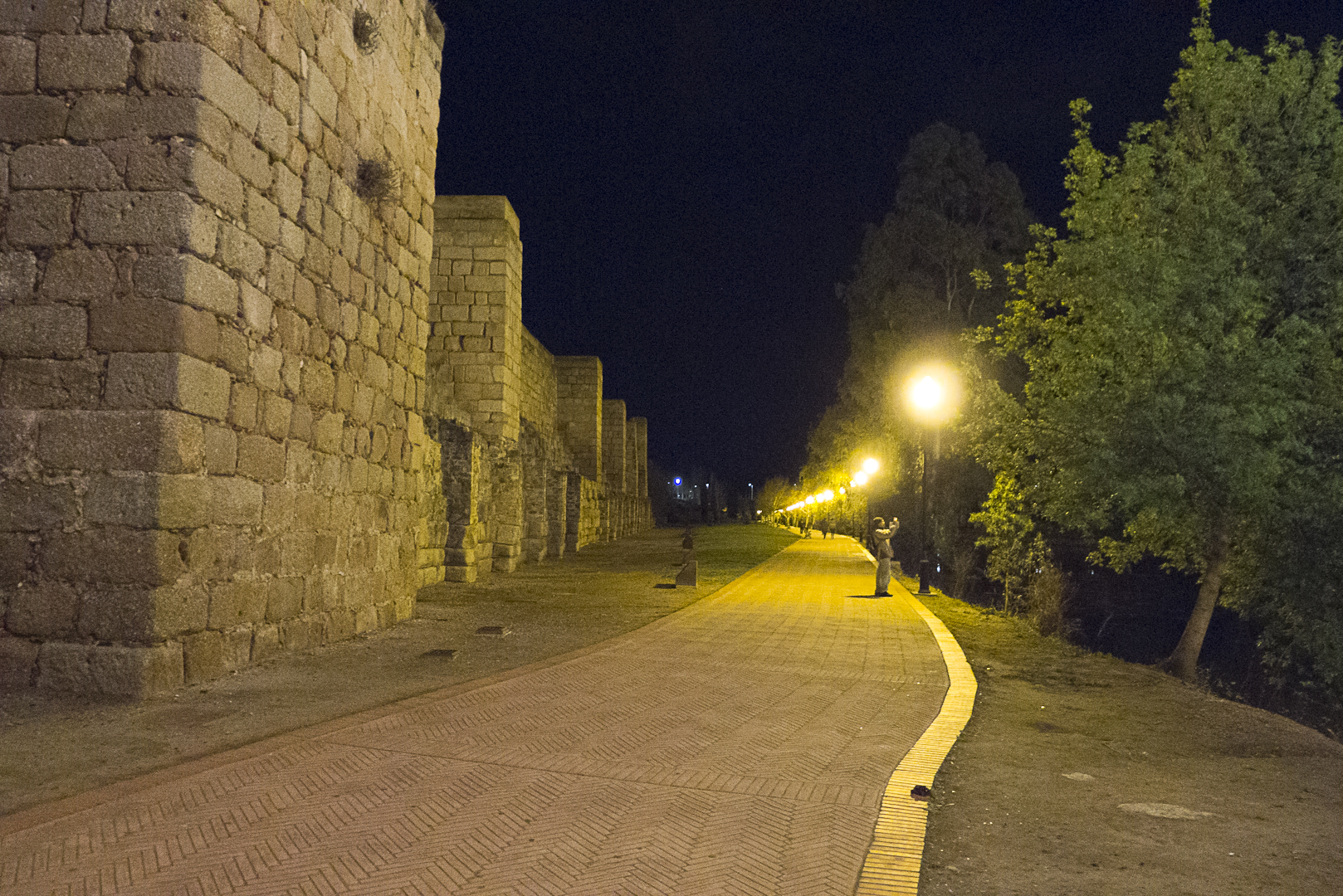
Roman Bridge

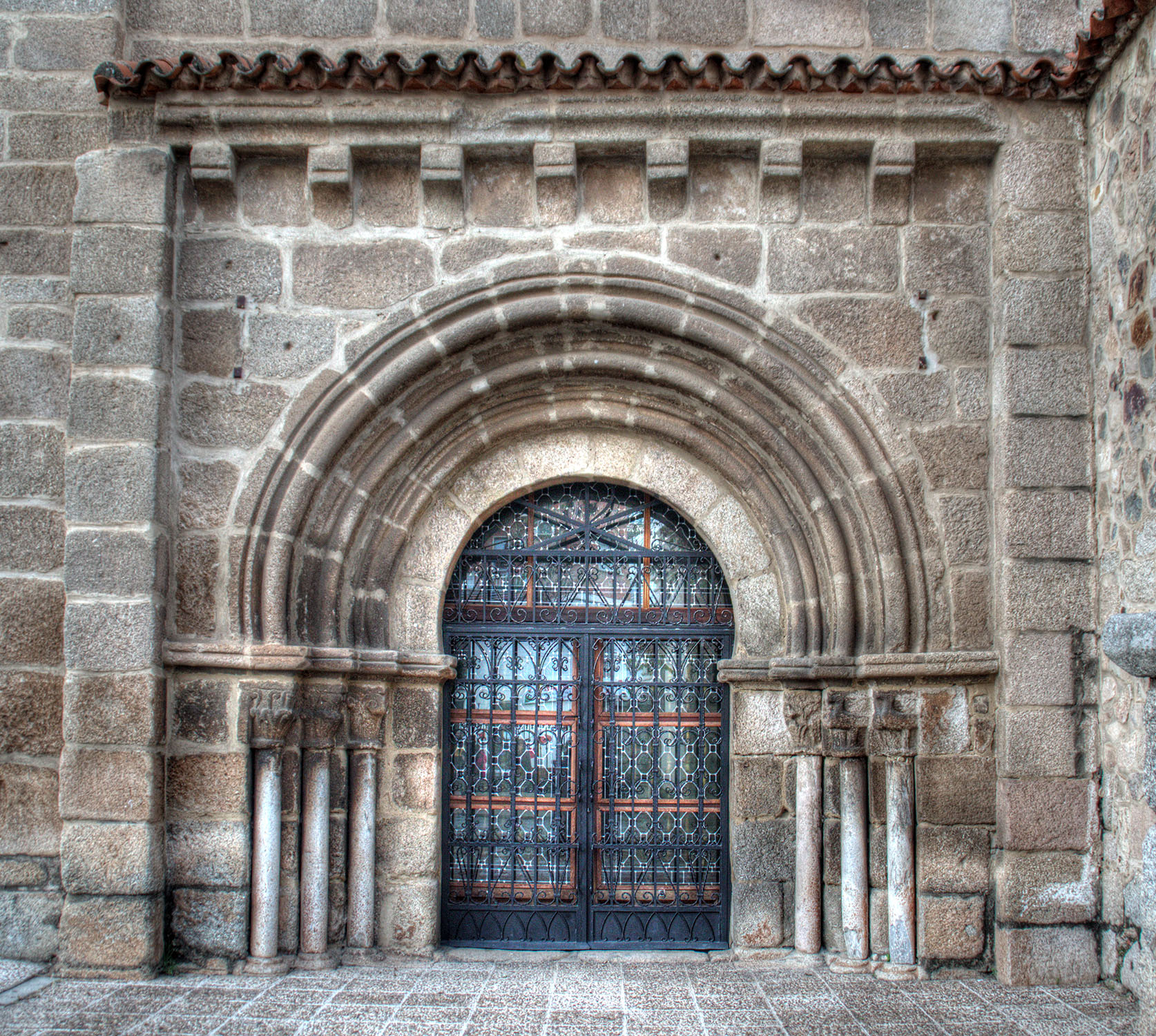
Late Romanesque Portal to Santa Eulalia Church

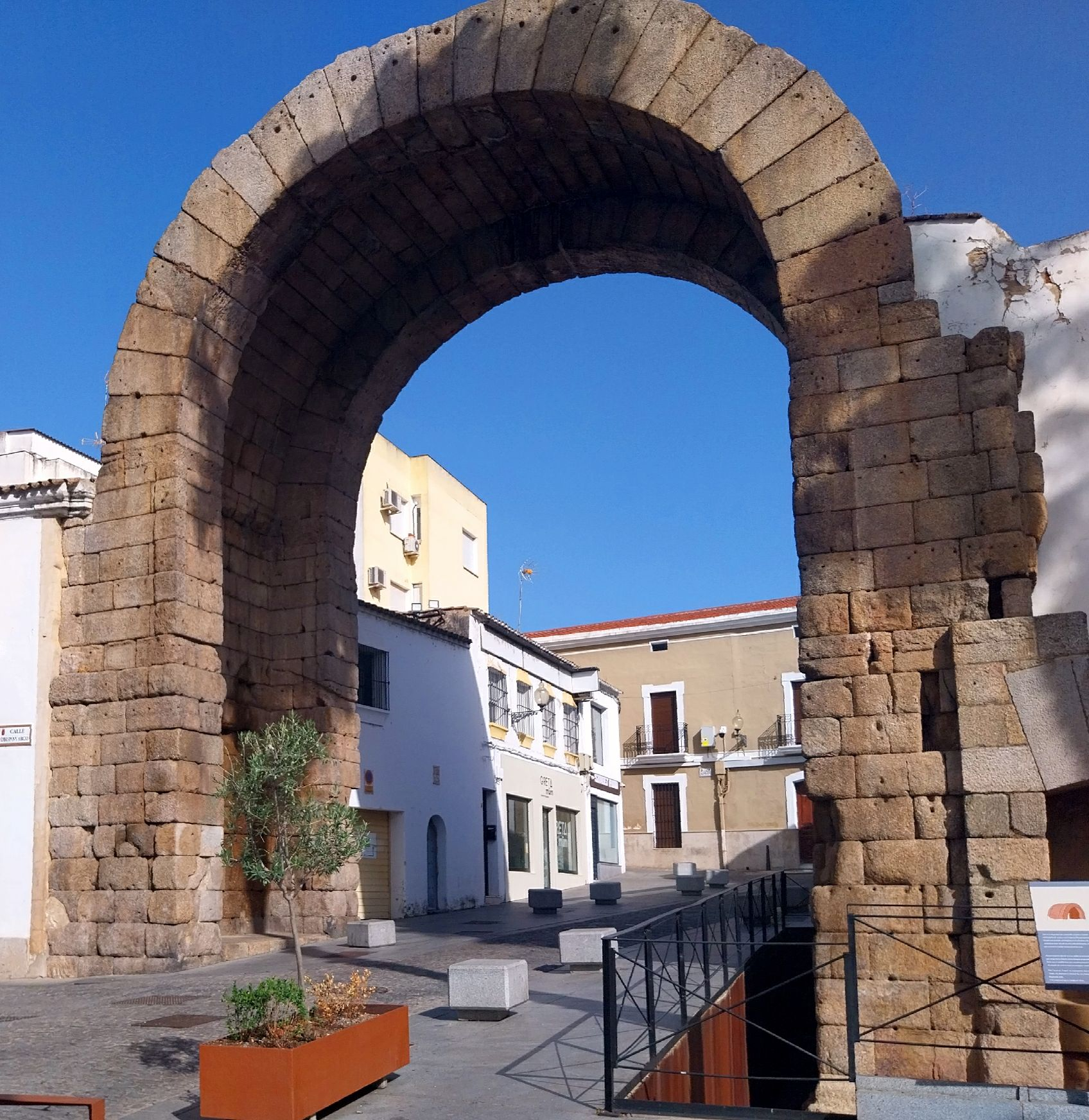
Trajan's Arch

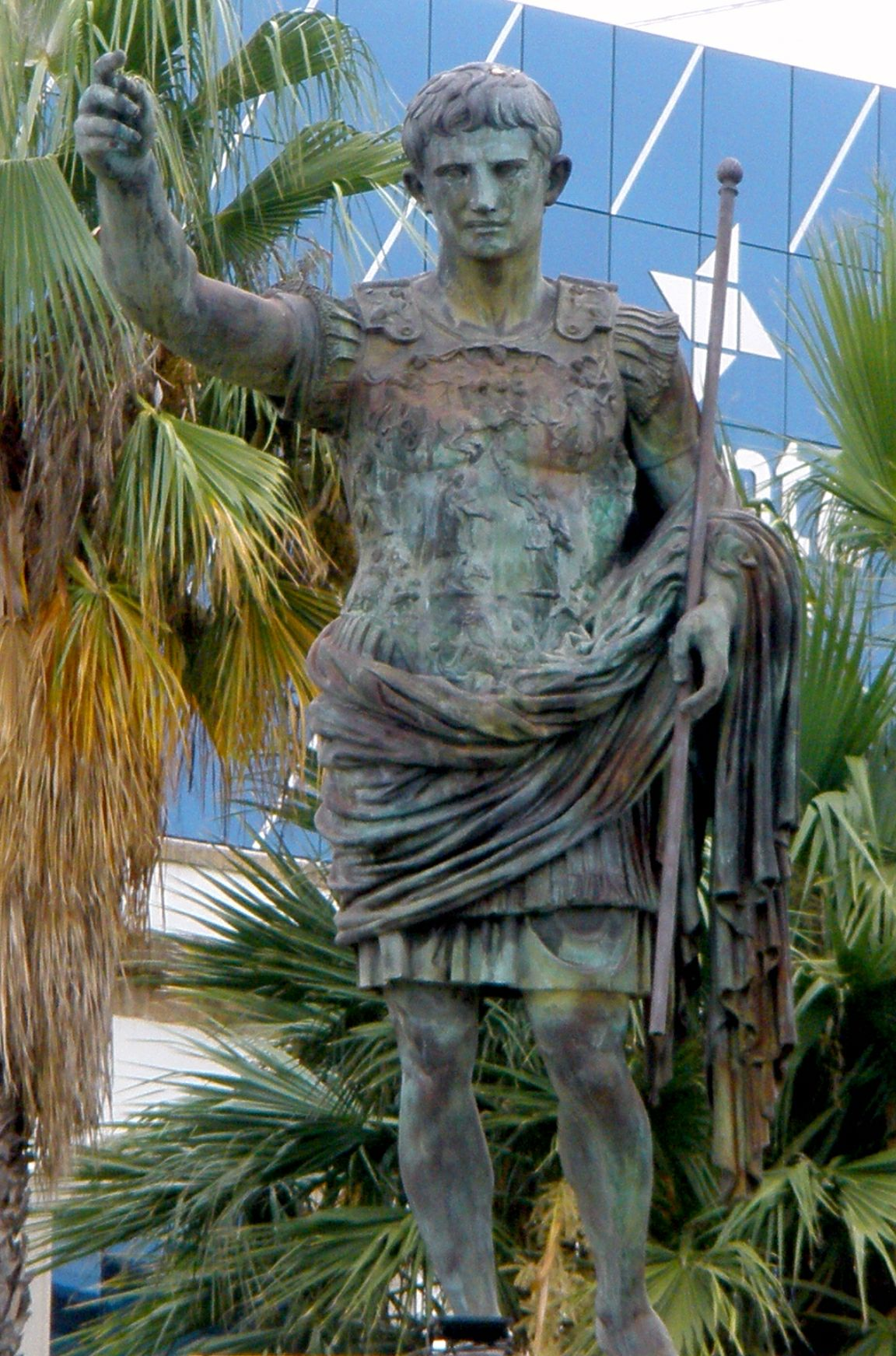
Monument to Octavian Augustus, for whom Augusta Emerita was named

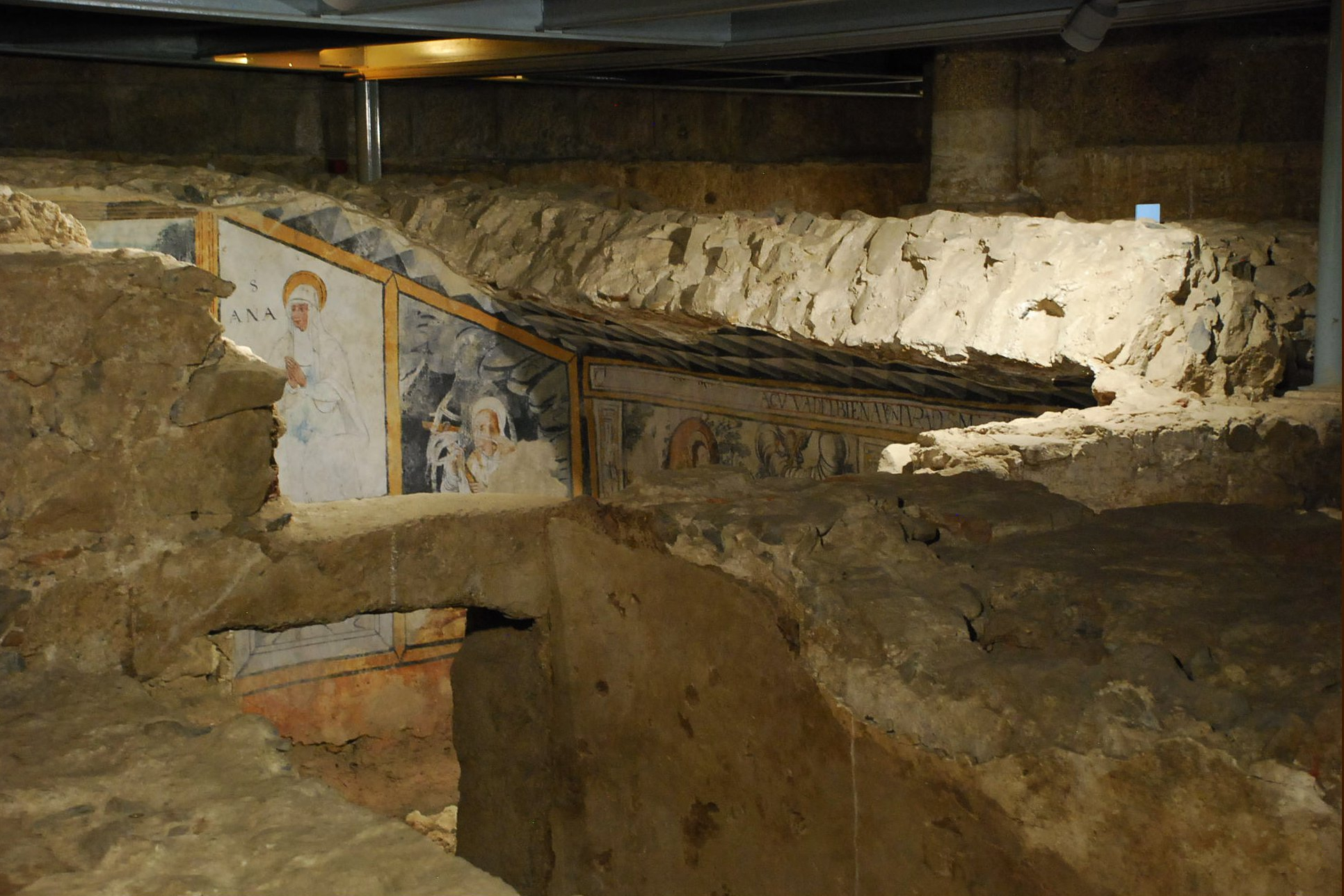
Roman Christian Basilica

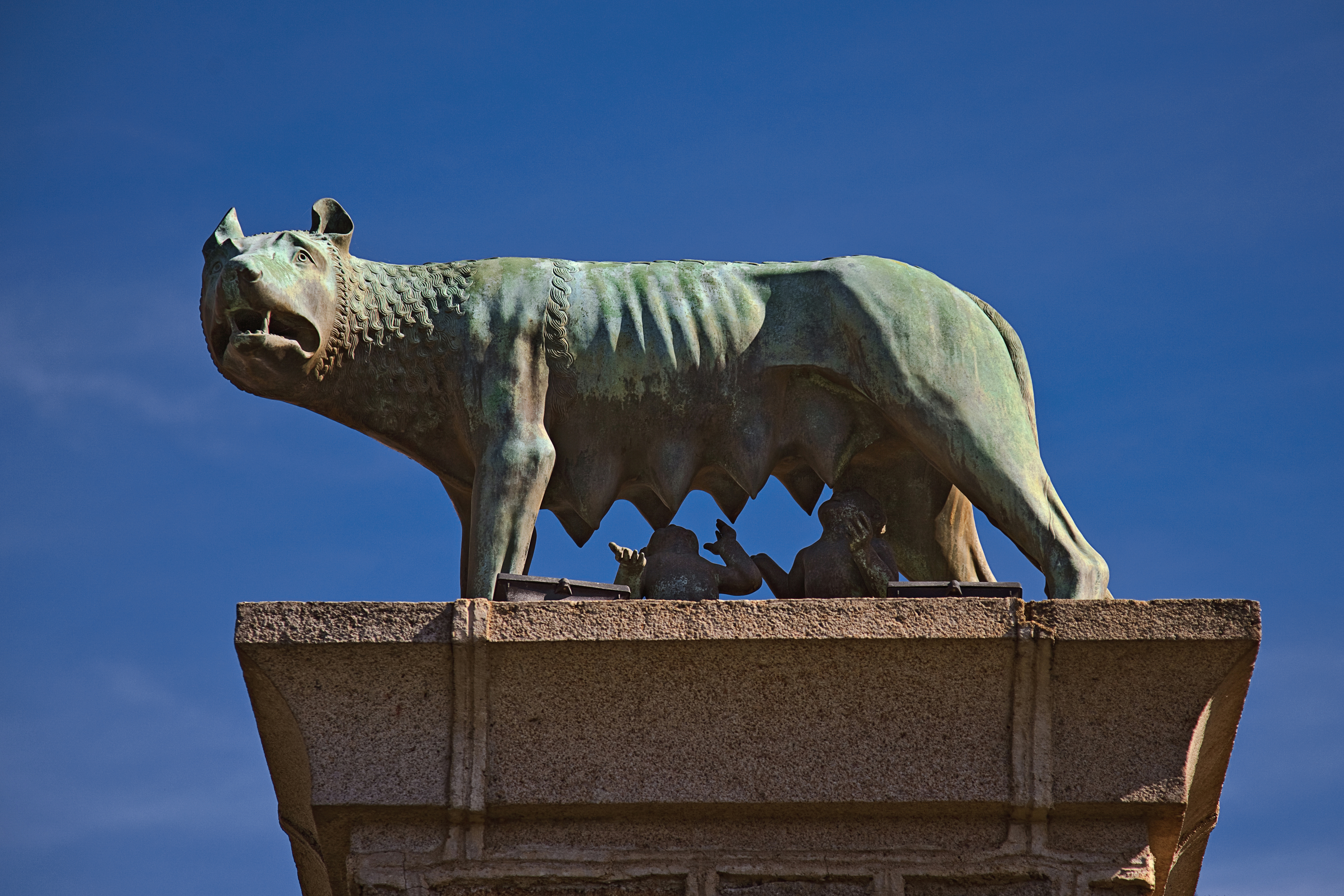
Copy of the Roman Capitoline She-Wolf

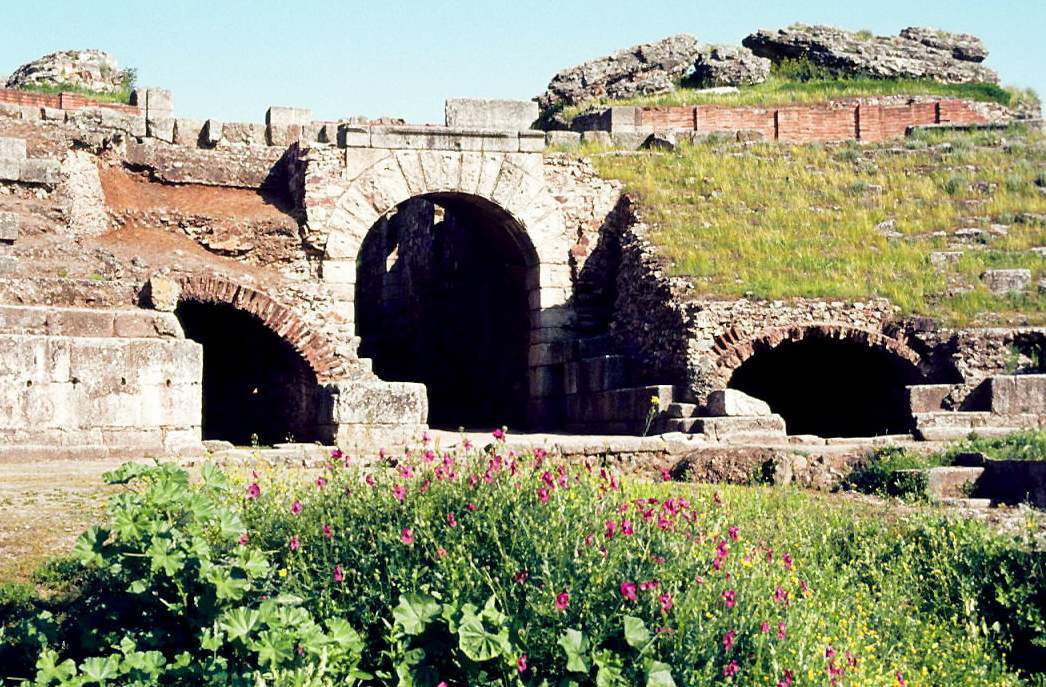
Entrances to the Arena

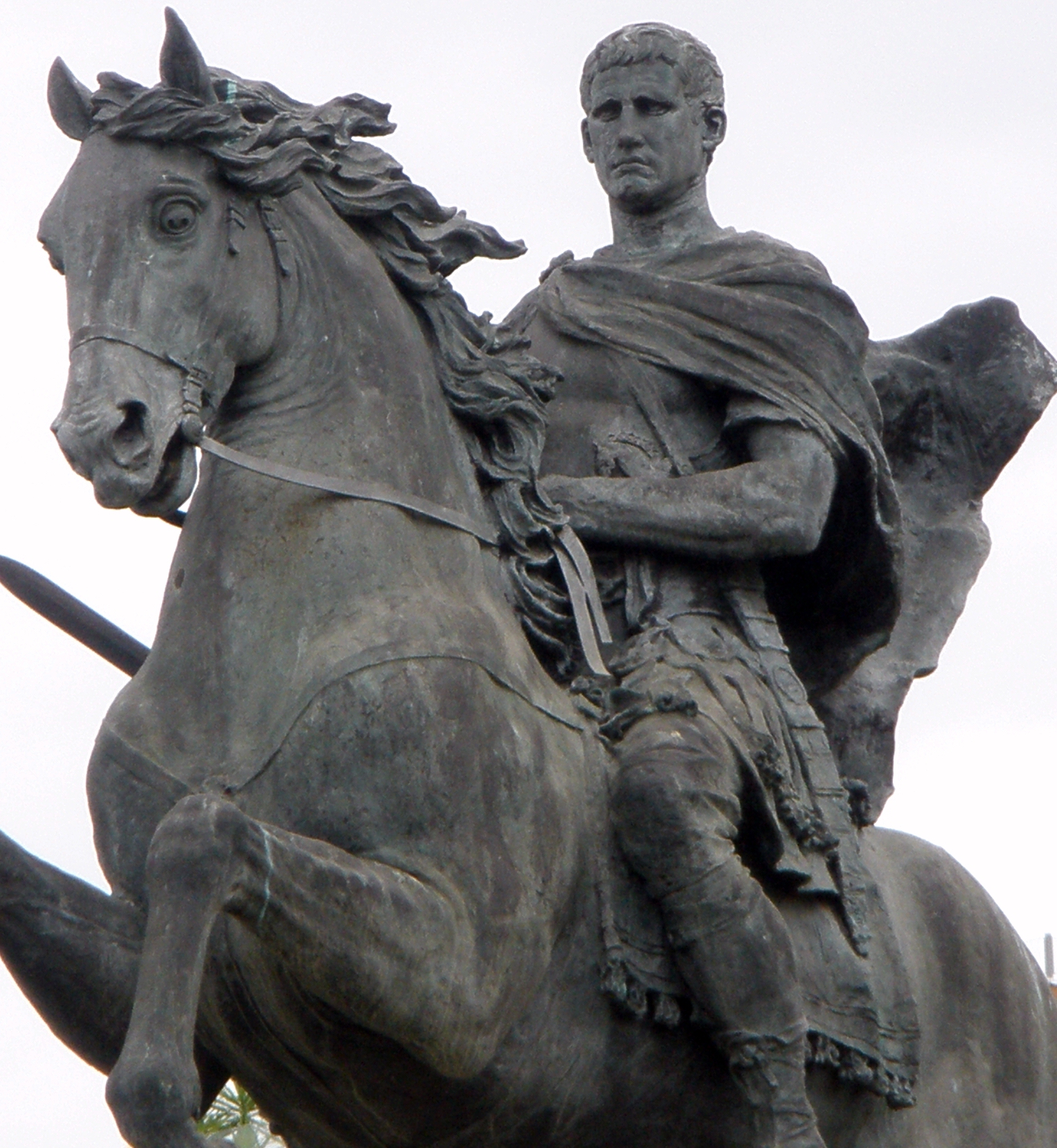
Monument to Marcus Agrippa

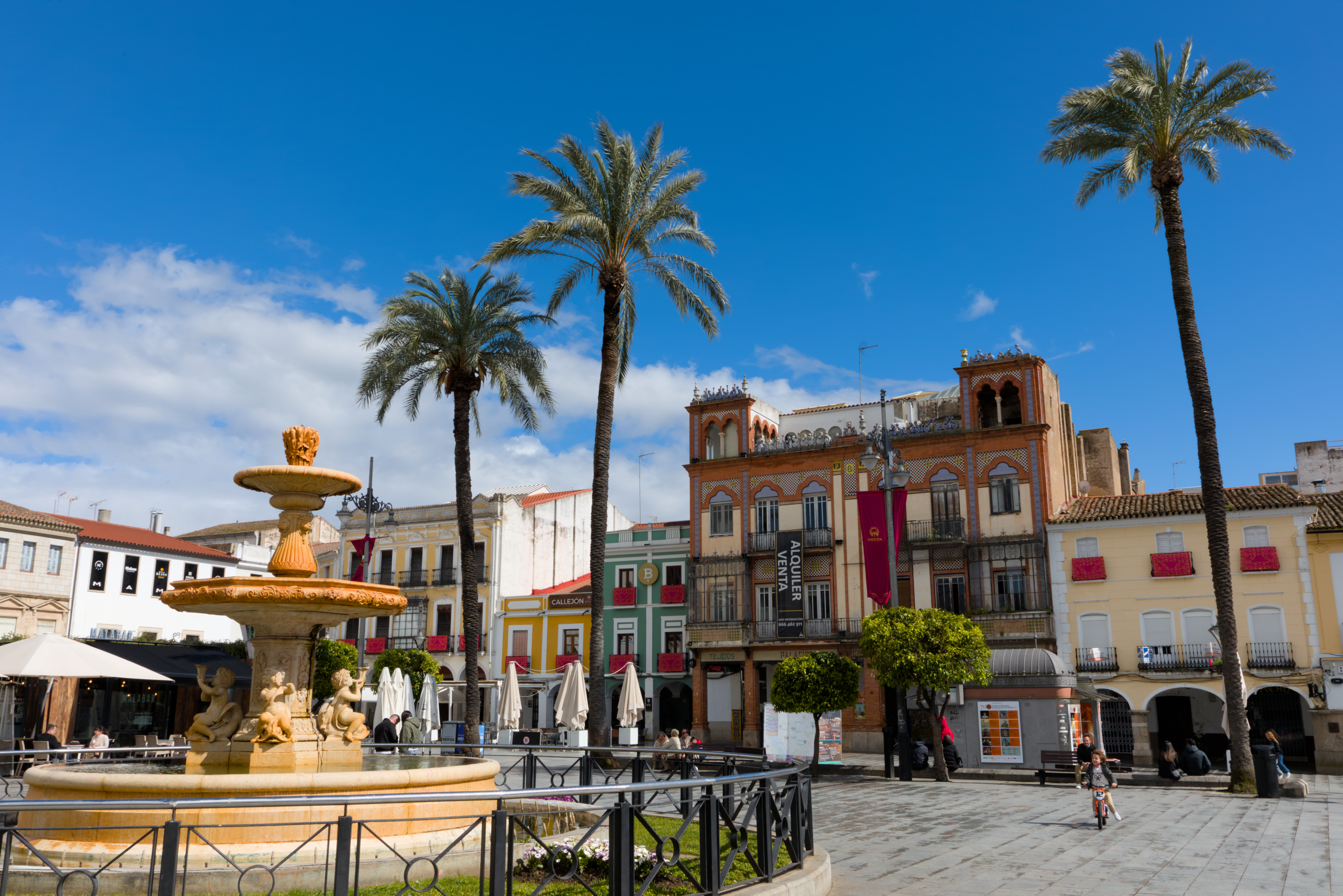
Spain Square, Mérida

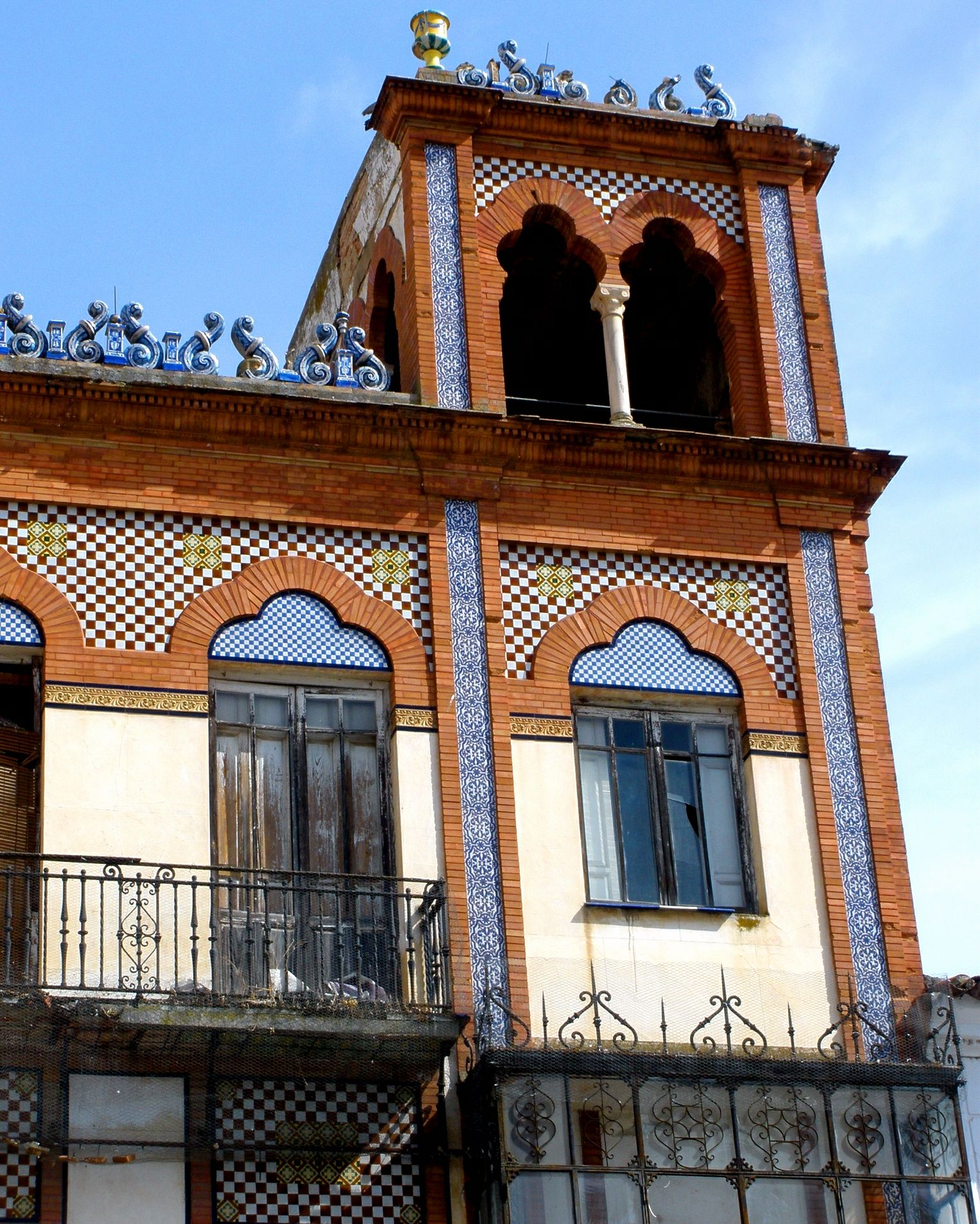
Chinese Palace

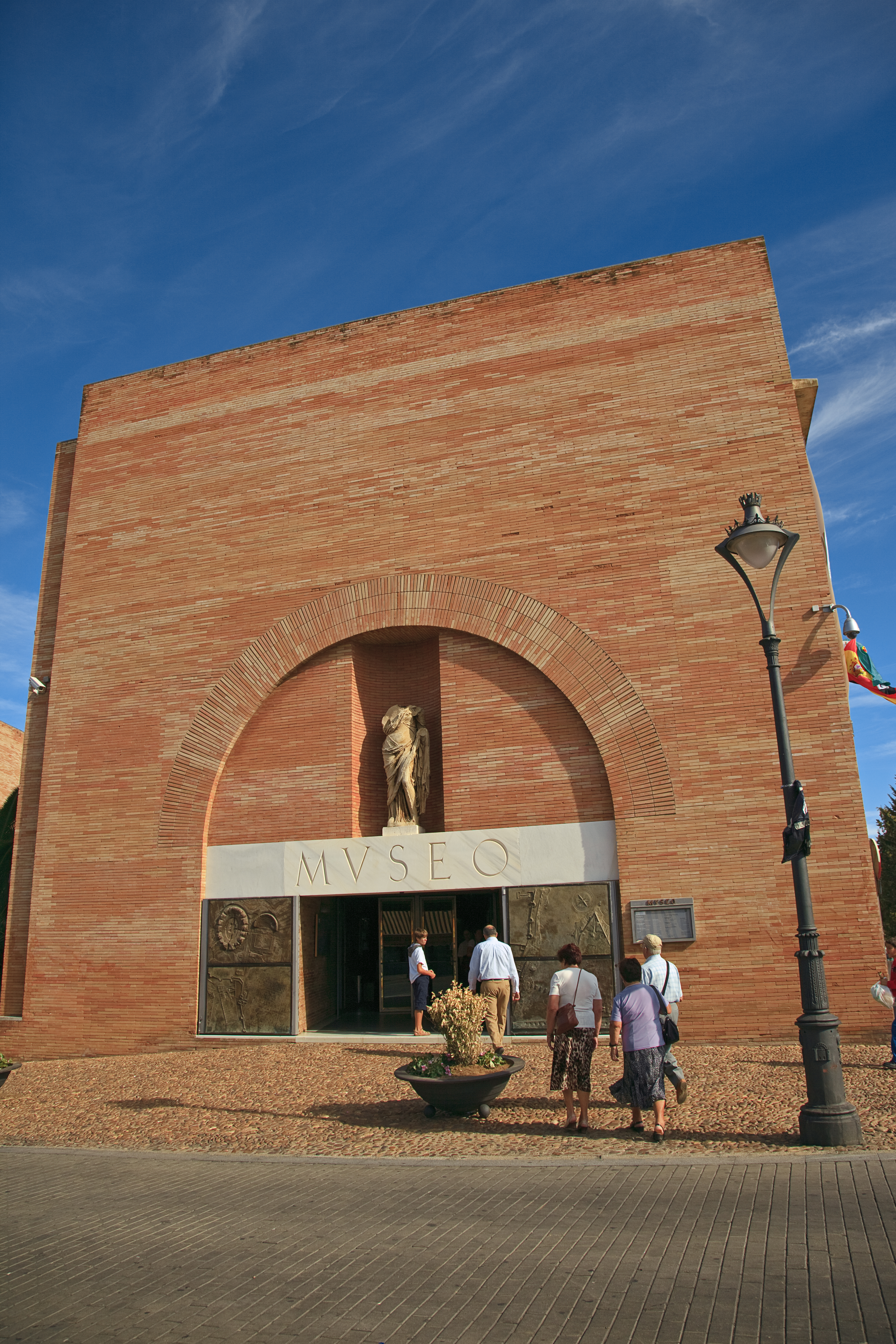
Exterior of Merida Museum

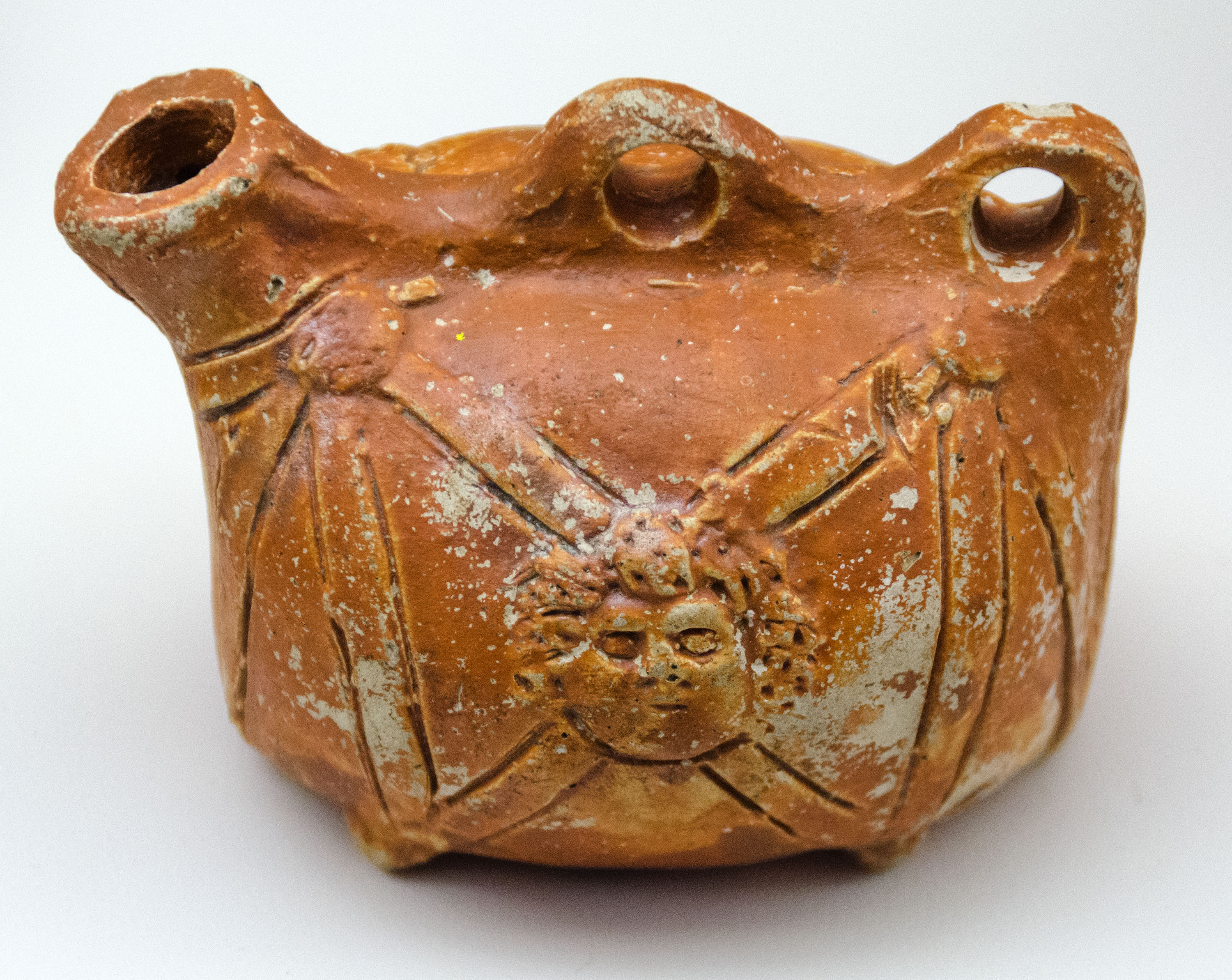
Roman ceramic canteen

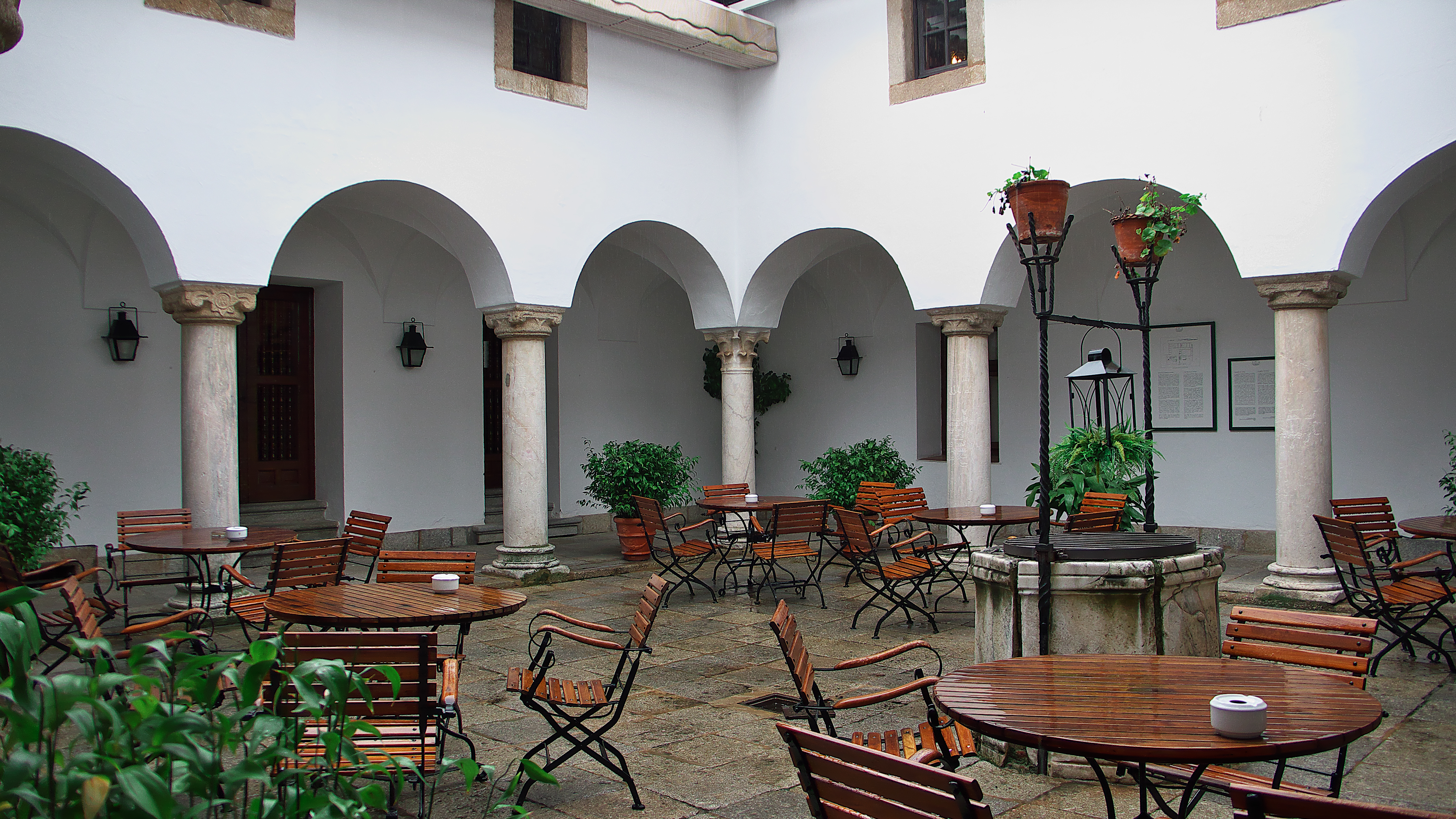
Patio of the Jesus of Nazareth Convent

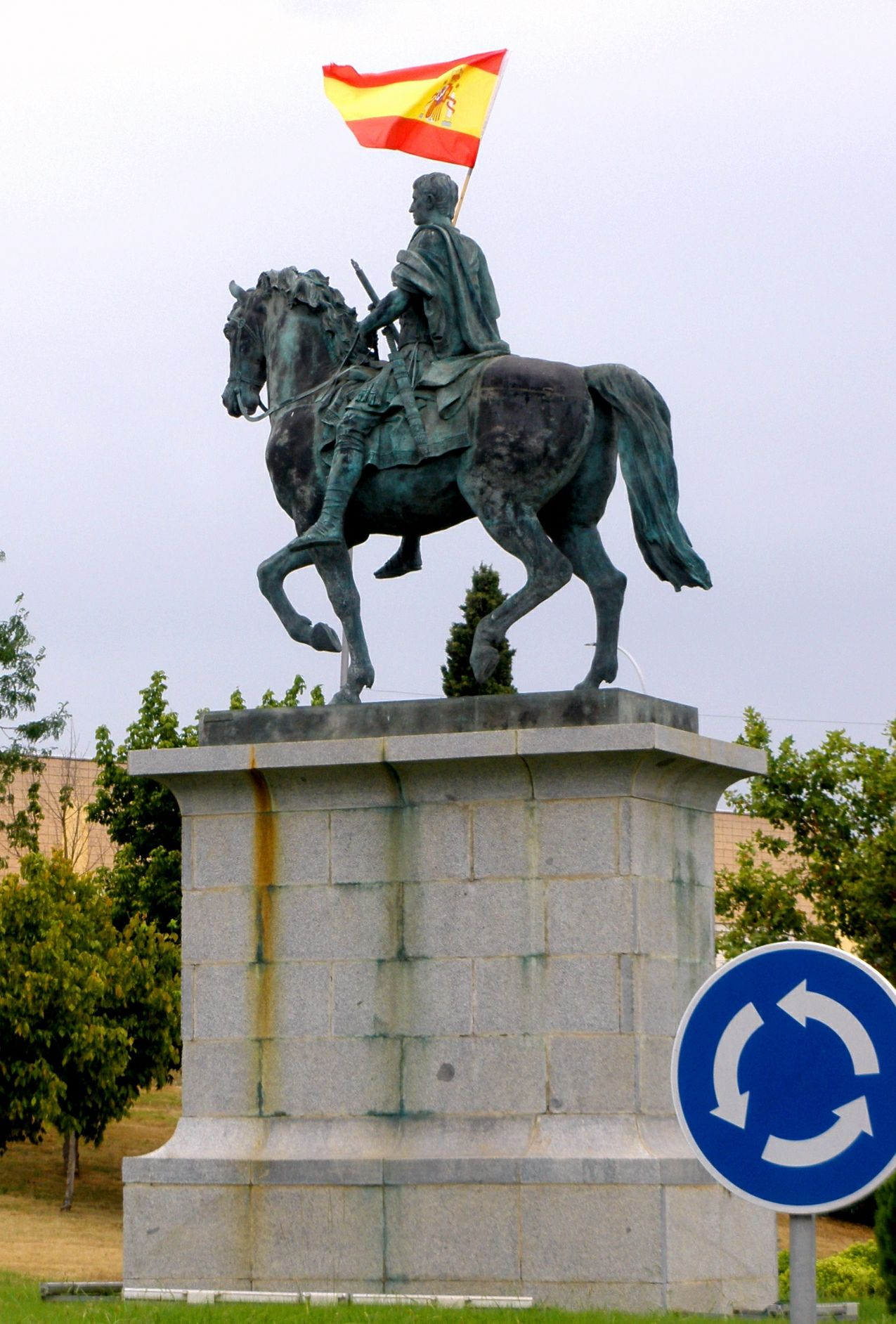
Equestrian Statue of Augustus Caesar

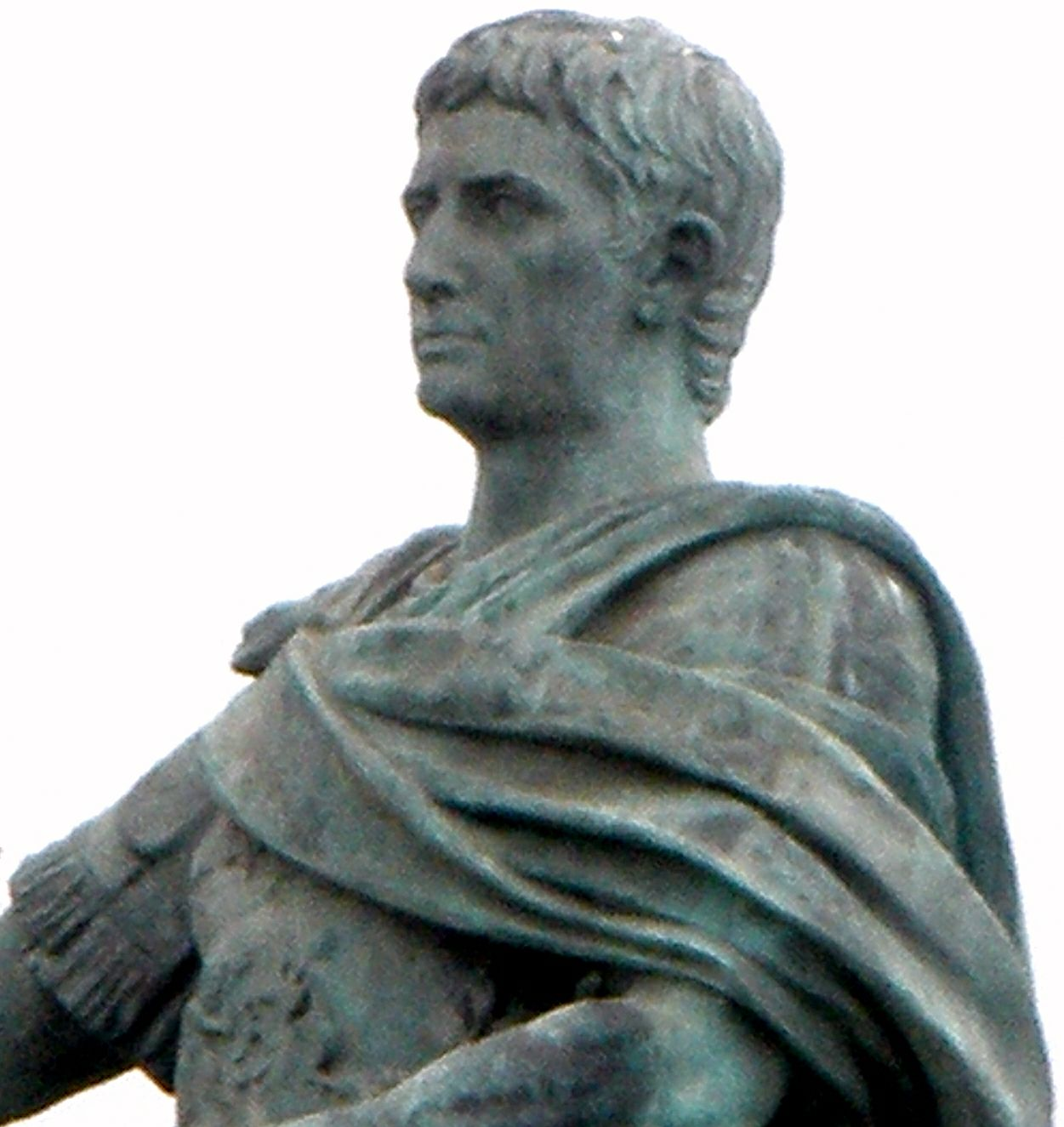
Closeup of Equestrian Statue of Augustus Caesar

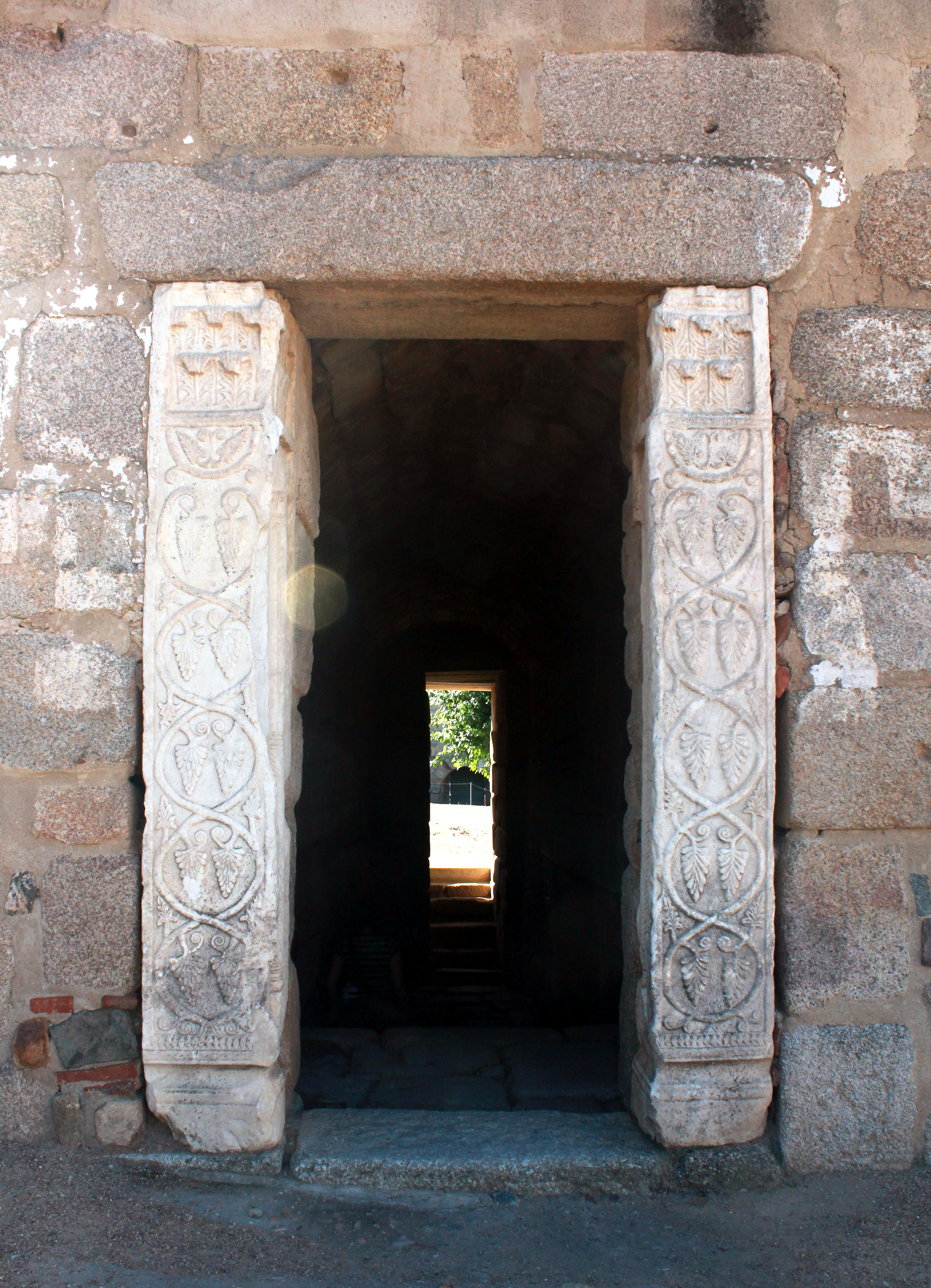
Alcazaba (Cistern) Mérida

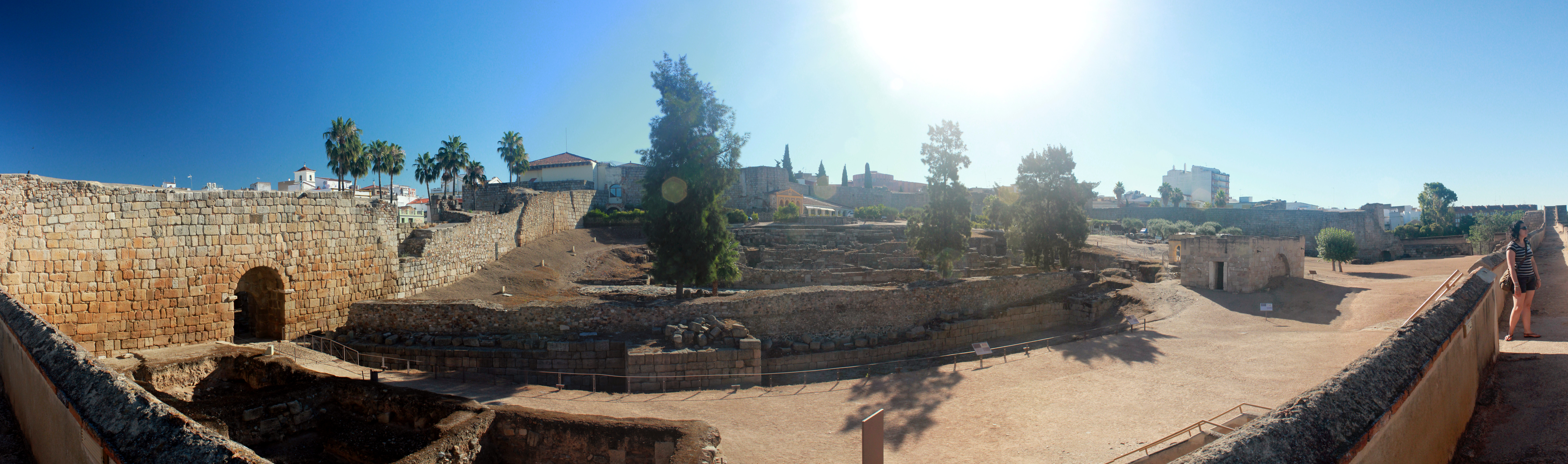
Panorama of Merida's Alcazaba

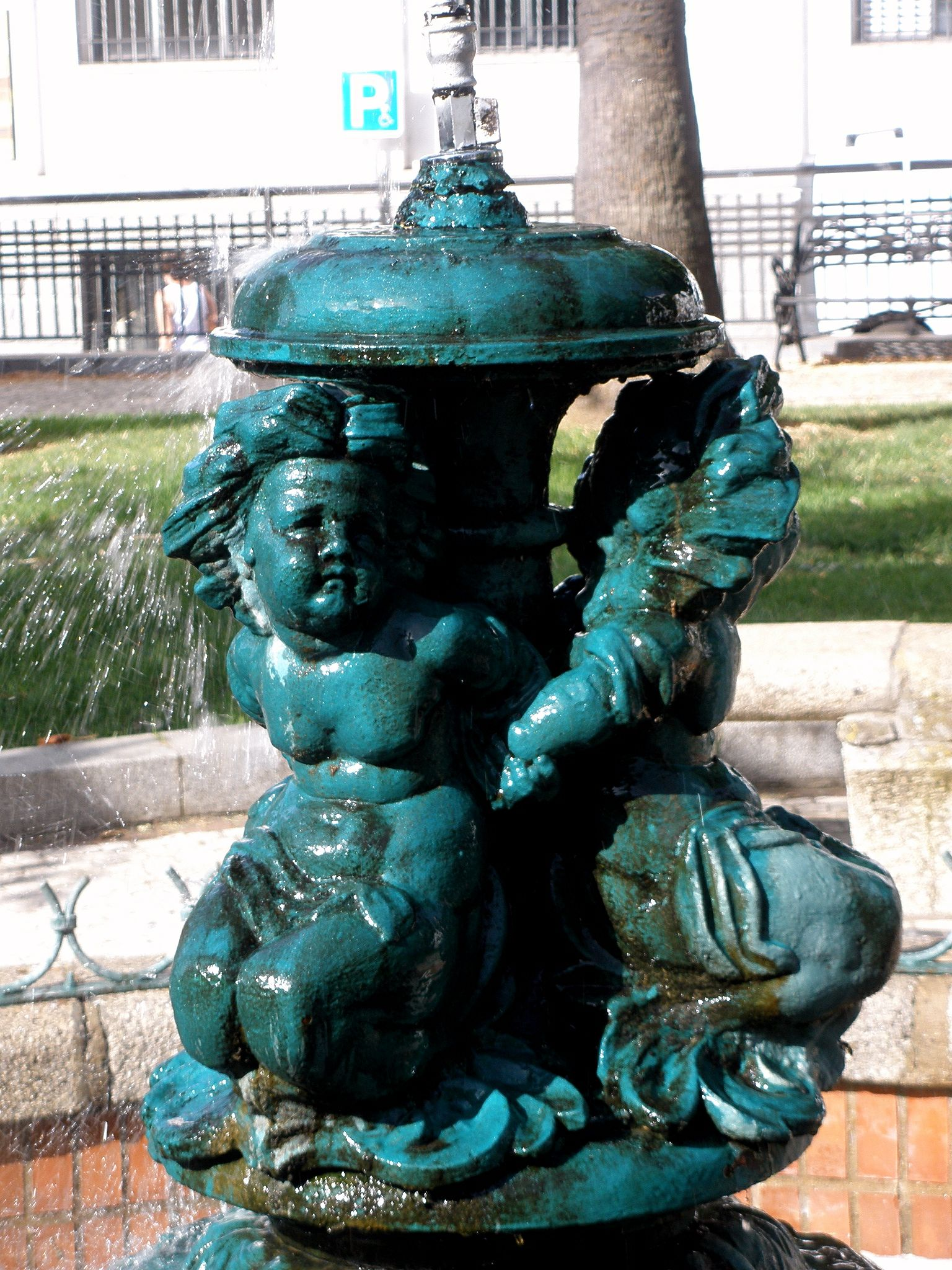
Plaza de la Constitución

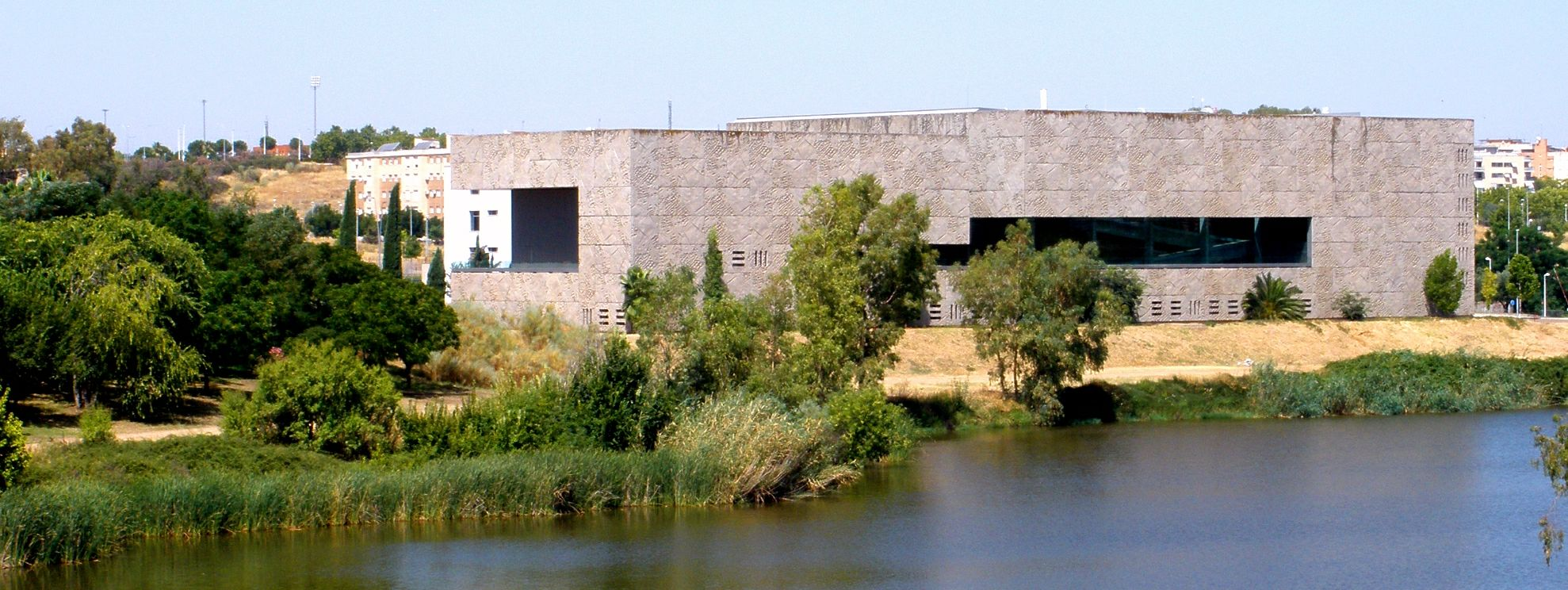
Mérida's Congress Palace

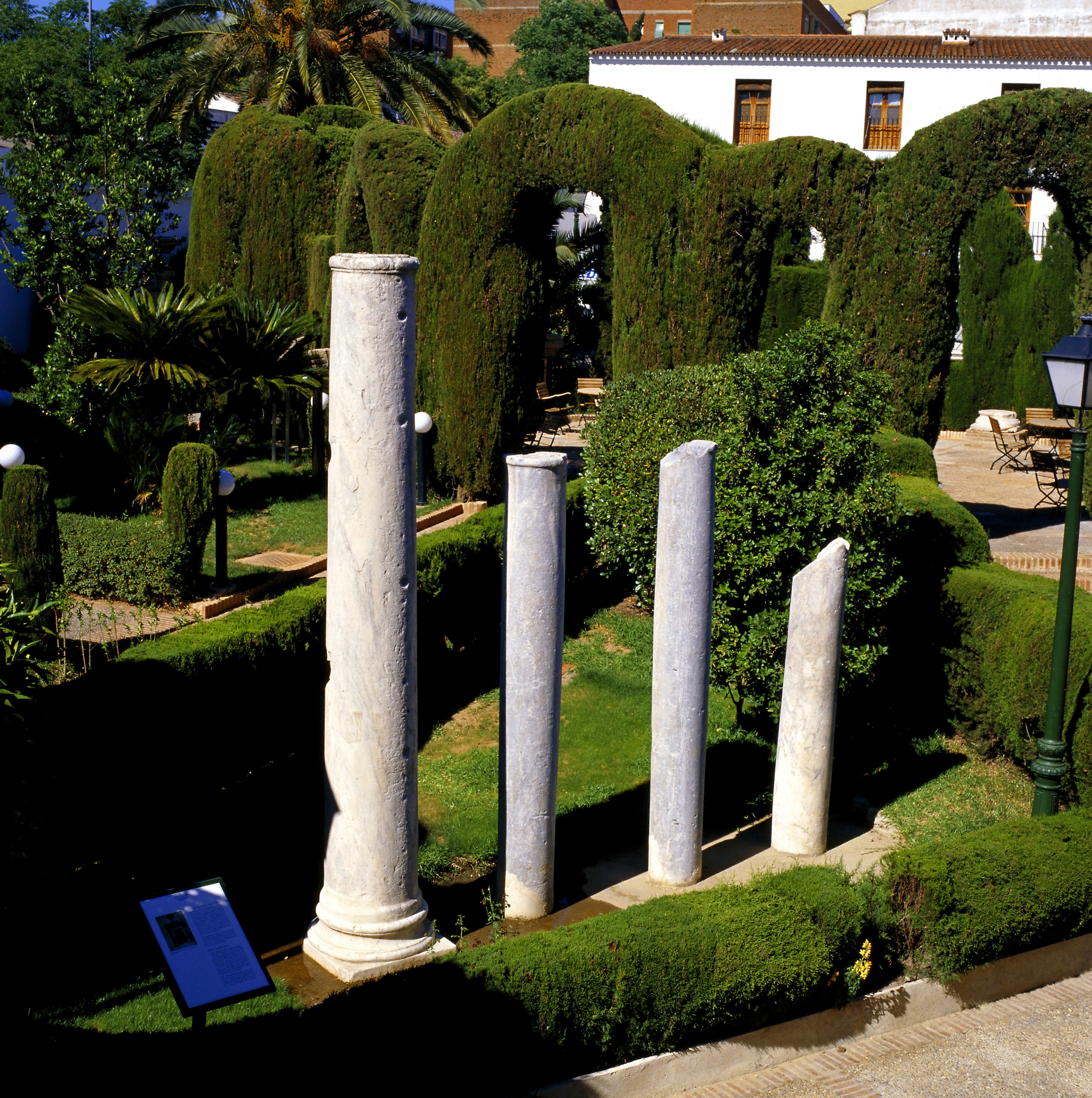
Parador de Mérida

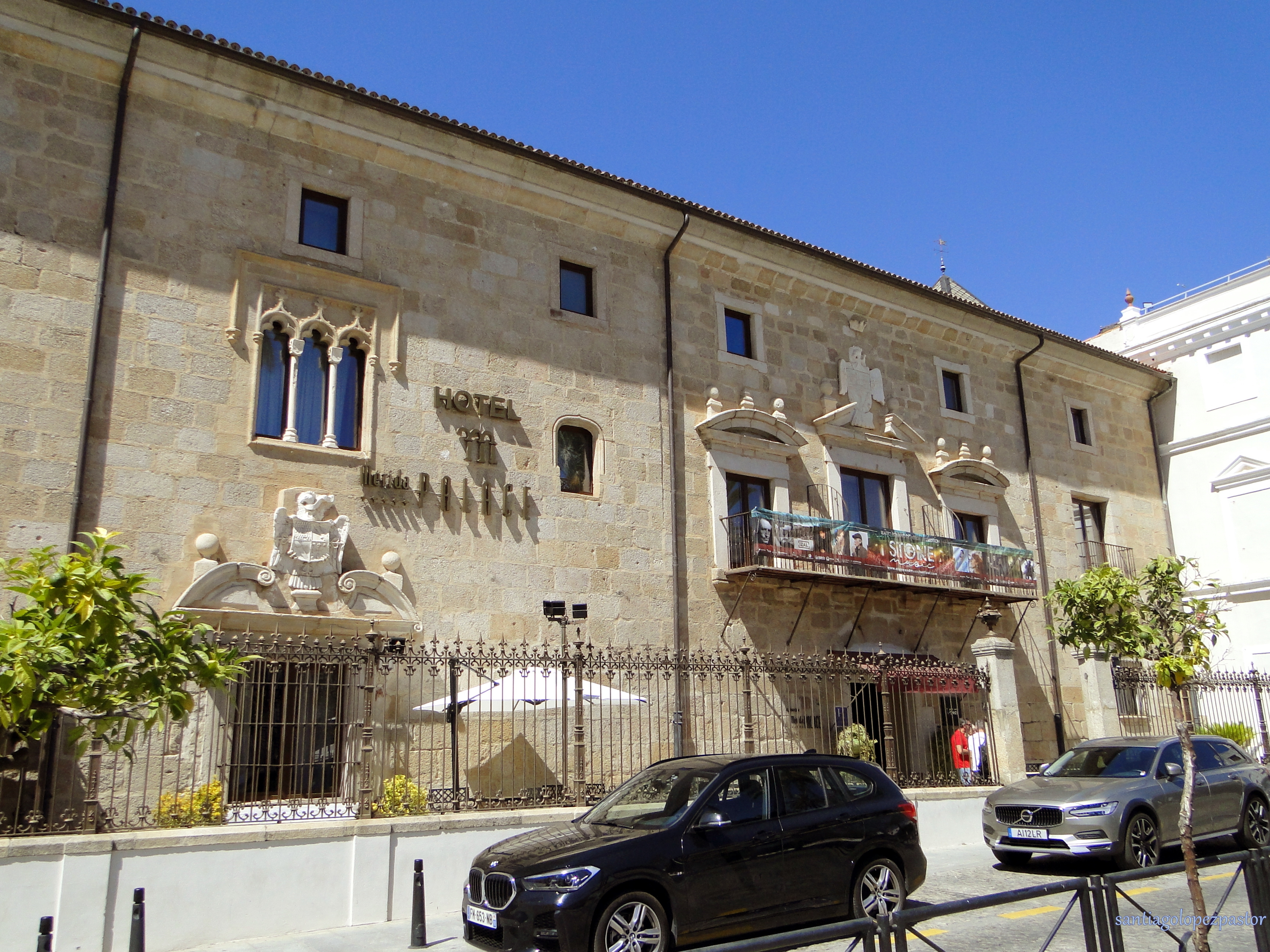
Hotel Mérida Palace

== See also ==
- Emerita Augusta, Roman buildings in Mérida
- Battle of Valverde (1385)
- List of municipalities in Badajoz

== Bibliography ==
- O'Connor, Colin (1993), Roman Bridges, Cambridge University Press, pp. 106–107, ISBN 0-521-39326-4
