= Alarcia =

- town
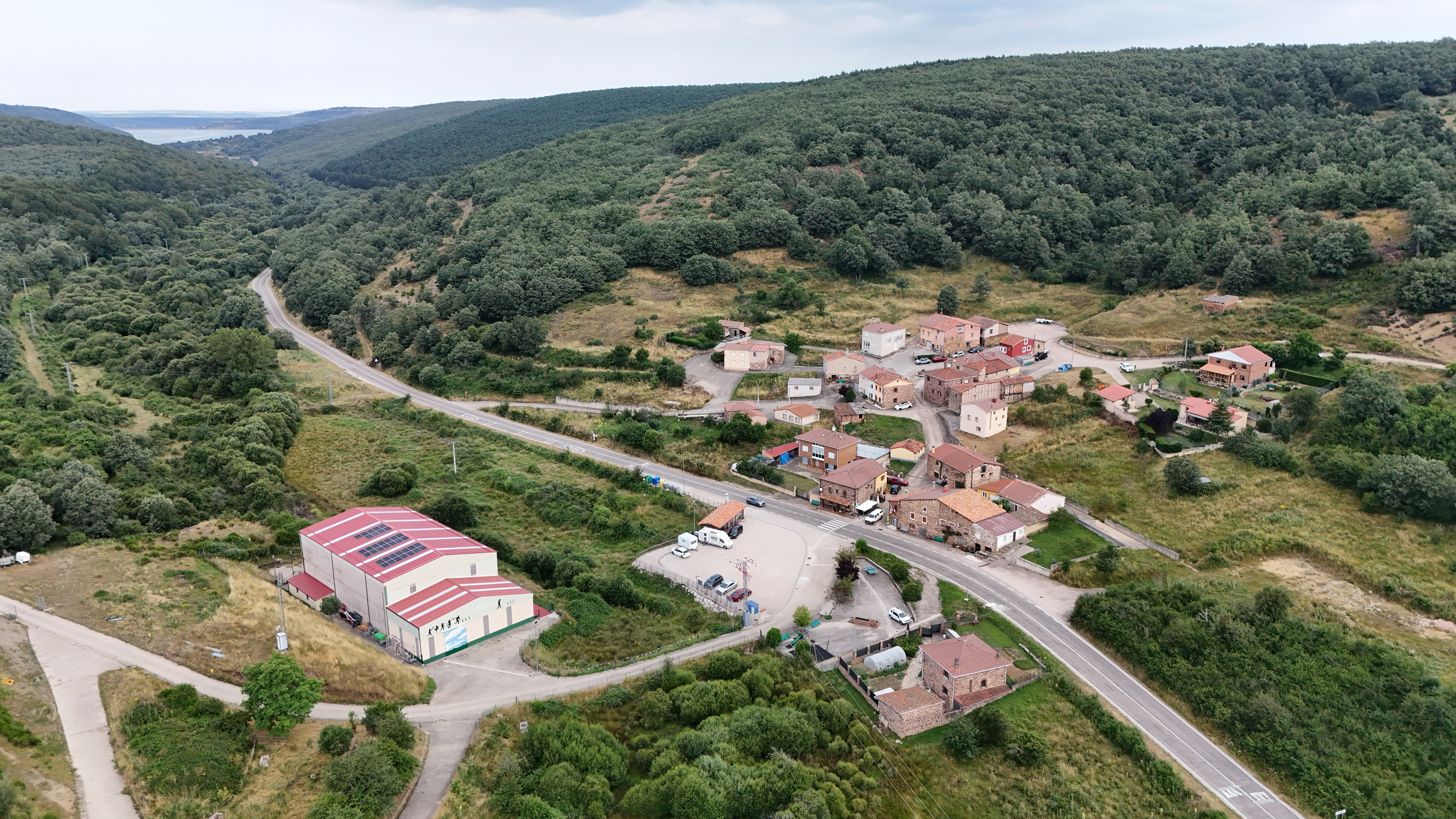
- View of Alarcia

- Location in Spain
- Coordinates: 42°18′N 3°17′W
- Country: Spain
- Autonomous community: Castile and León
- Province: Burgos
- Comarca: Montes de Oca
- Municipality: Rábanos

Area
  - Total: 15 km^{2} (5.8 sq mi)
- Elevation: 1,177 m (3,862 ft)

Population (2007)
  - Total: 63
- Time zone: UTC+1 (CET)
  - Summer (DST): UTC+2 (CEST)
- Postal code: 09199
- Distances: 42 km to Burgos; 25 km to Ezcaray; 20 km to Belorado; 5 km to Rábanos
- Website: Alarcia's record card (province website)

Alarcia is a town of northern Spain, Autonomous Community of Castile and León, province of Burgos, Shire of Montes de Oca, sub-shire of Tirón-Rioja Burgalesa, in the municipality of Rábanos. It lies between the reservoir Úzquiza (west) and the peak of San Millan (2,131 m) in the Sierra de la Demanda (southeast).

== History ==
On arrival of the Romans in this area (1st Century AD), It belonged to the territory of Autrigones tribe.

The current shire of Montes de Oca, where is Halariza, Alariza or Alarcia, was repopulated mainly by Astur, Cantabri, Visigothic and Vascones (Basques) origins in the mid-ninth century, although remained border between the County of Castile with the Caliphate of Córdoba and its allies for at least a century. The shire was afterwards border between kingdom of Castile and the kingdom of Navarre till the mid-twelfth century. During this period the shire to which belonged change from one kingdom to another until finally passed to the kingdom of Castile after an award, in 1146.

It appears that the population has its origin in the high-medieval repopulation, but it is not named till 1068 when appears in the endowment document of the episcopal see of Oca that the first king of Castile, Sancho II granted to its Bishop, linking it to Abbey Foncea or Broncea.

It is named in the fuero (charter) of Cerezo, which was granted by Alfonso VII of León and Castile, 10 January 1146, to the town of Cerezo de Río Tirón. Between the 134 villages belonged to the alfoz of Cerezo, appears Halariza next to Valmala and Sancta Crux del Valle (Urbión).
Named like Alarcia, its first written record, appears in the census of Floridablanca (1785–1787).

== Artistic and natural heritage ==
- Romanesque church
- Reservoir Úzquiza
- Sierra de la Demanda

=== Parish of San Bartolomé ===
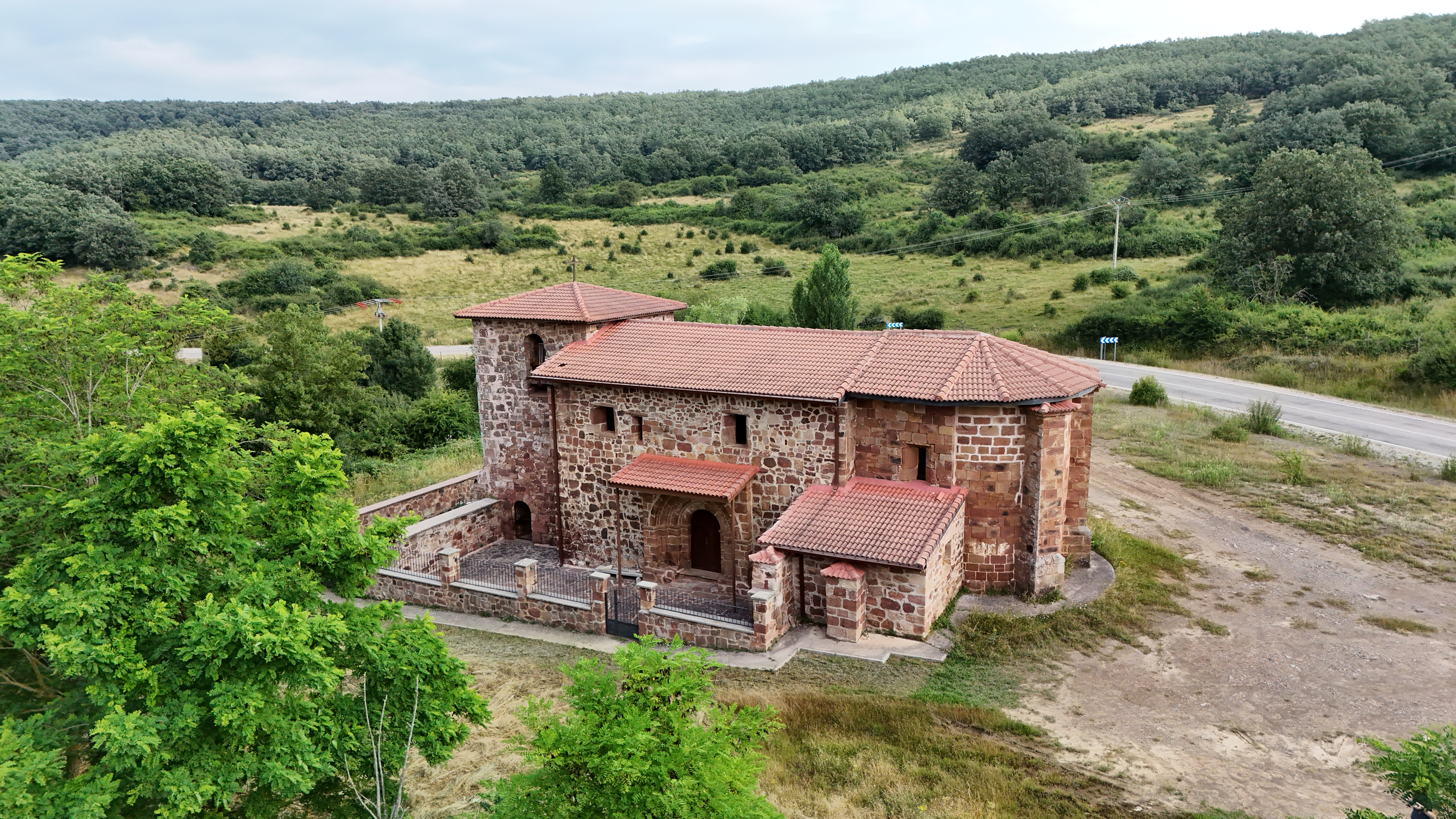
Church of Alarcia

Is a Romance church dedicated to the La Asunción de Nuestra Señora, employee of the parish of Villasur de Herreros in the Arcipestrazgo of San Juan de Ortega, diocese of Burgos. The church was built between the late 10th century and the 13th century and reformed in the 15th century. Recently recovered (2001,...) by the own diocese.

== Culture ==
- Village festivals The weekend nearest San Bartholomew (24 of August).

== Population change ==
The table below details the population since 1842.

Population in Alarcia since 1842
Year	1842^{[a]}	2000	2001	2002	2003	2004	2005	2006	2007
Population	46	48	57	60	48	82	64	64	63
Source: INE

== Bibliography ==
- Sebastián de Miñano y Bedoya Diccionario geográfico-estadístico de España y Portugal Madrid, published by Pierart-Peralta, (1826–1829), 11 vols.
- Don Pascual Madoz Diccionario geográfico-estadístico de España y sus posesiones de ultramar, de 1846

== Notes ==
^{a} Historic series census
