= Dolmen del prado de Lácara =

- Dolmen del prado de Lácara (Spanish)
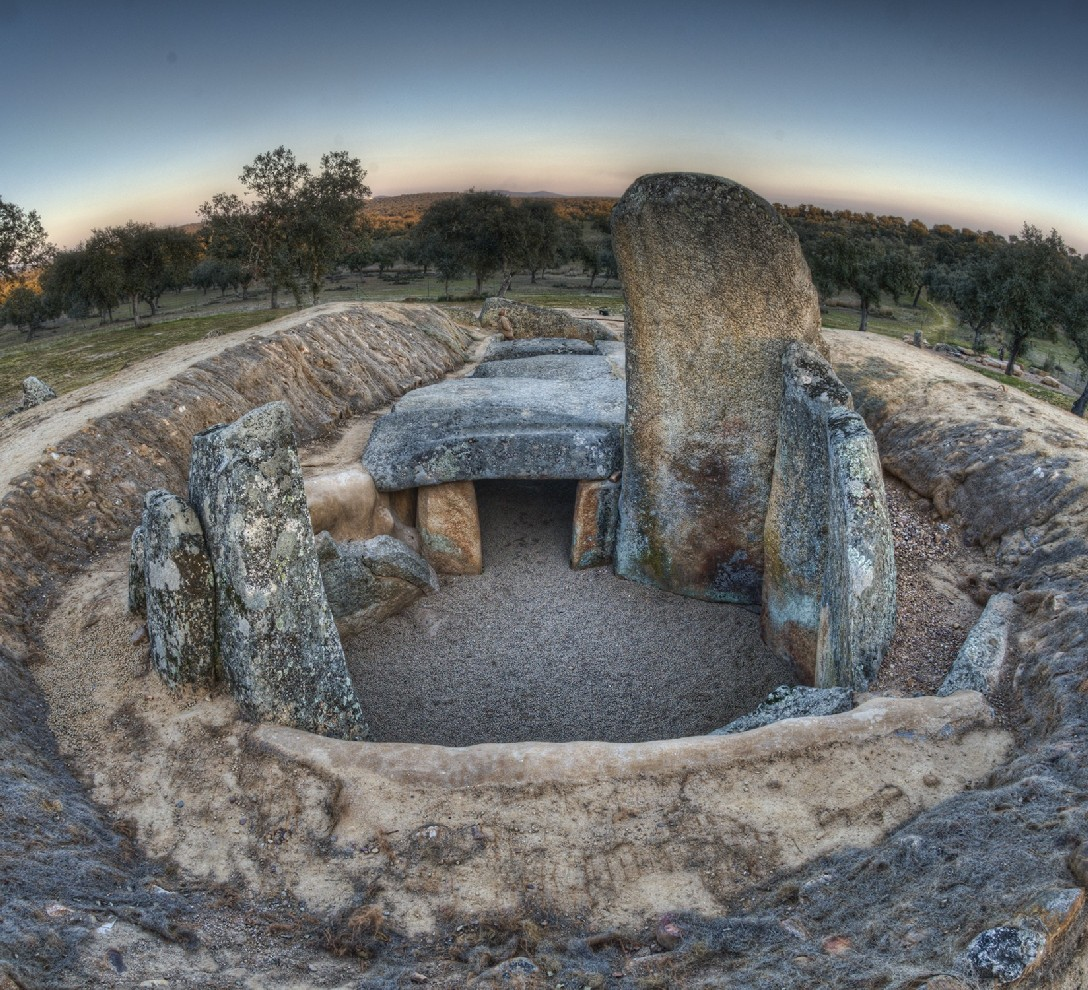
- The dolmen in 2012
- Interactive map of Dolmen del prado de Lácara
- 39.0498°N 6.4209°W
- Location: Extremadura, Spain

History
- Built: c. 3000 BC

Site notes
- Height: 5.2 meters

Spanish Cultural Heritage
- Official name: Dolmen del prado de Lácara
- Type: Non-movable
- Criteria: Monument
- Designated: 1912
- Reference no.: RI-51-0000106

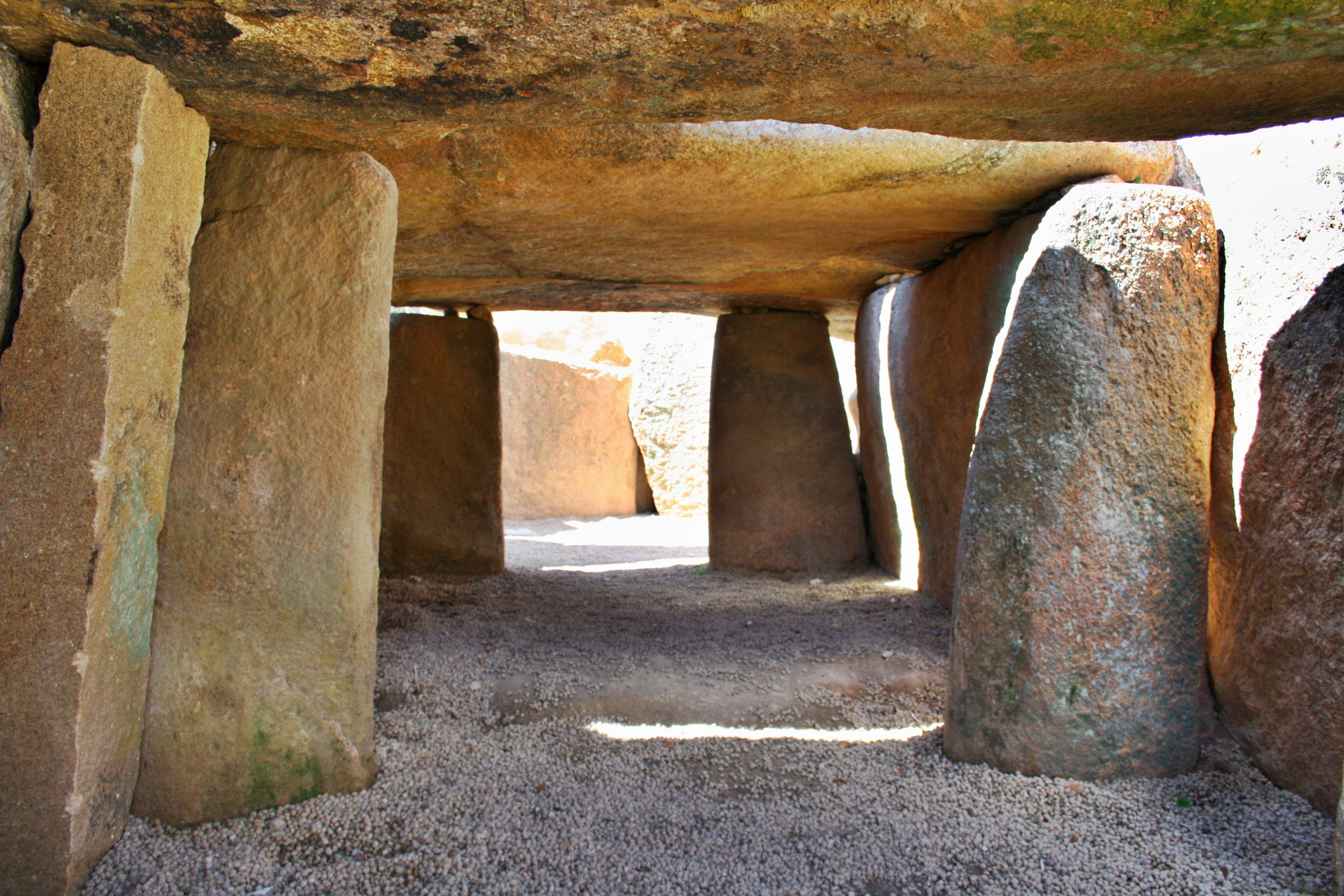
Interior

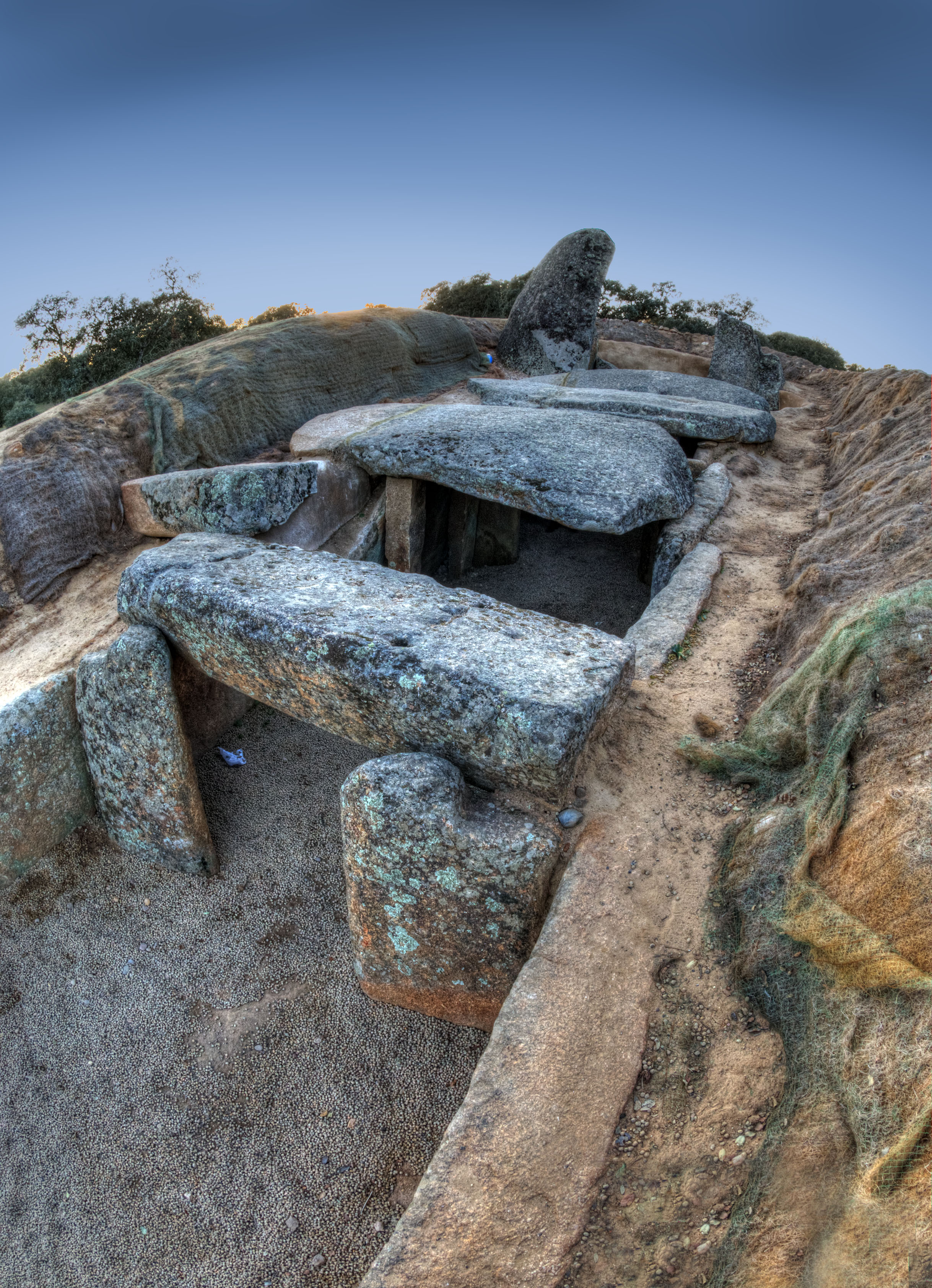

The Dolmen del prado de Lácara ('Dolmen of the Meadow of Lácara') is a megalithic monument known as a passage tomb. It is located northwest of the Spanish city of Merida, in the province of Badajoz. It is located next to the EX-214 road, which connects Aljucén with La Nava de Santiago. It is a notable megalithic tomb, built during the late Neolithic towards the end of the 4th millennium BC or early 3rd millennium BC. It is one of the most monumental and well preserved sites in the Extremadura region, which is why it was declared a site of cultural interest in 1912 and a National Monument in 1931.

== Location ==
In keeping with other Extremaduran megaliths, the Dolmen del prado de Lácara is located in a natural holm oak pasture, occupying a small hill that rises above the surrounding area and where it is close to several water features, including the Lácara river which runs to the east of the monument. In the surroundings there are abundant granite outcrops that at the time provided the necessary raw material to build the tomb. These particularities of its location have led researchers such as Enrique Navascués to think that in addition to being a burial place and a symbol of the town that erected it, these megaliths could also be territorial demarcations or reference landmarks in the planning of this territory in prehistory. There has also been speculation about its strategic location in relation to nearby roads and transit areas.

Despite all the theories, the truth is that this megalith is relatively isolated, since the closest dolmens, such as Carmonita or Cueva del Monje, are between 13 and 15 km away, making it difficult to establish that it formed a part of an organized set of collective burials. In any case, it is usually considered that the dolmens in the vicinity of Mérida may constitute an eastern prolongation of the dense megalithic nucleus of Alburquerque - Villar del Rey - La Roca de la Sierra, as can be deduced from their geographical position.

== Description ==
The one in Lácara is a dolmen of the most common type in the Extremaduran community, as it is a tomb with a long and well-developed corridor, the largest that has been documented in the region. The chamber used for collective burials, is a space with an almost circular, polygonal plan with a diameter of five meters. It is formed by seven large slabs or orthostats made of granite standing vertically, which rest one on top of the other until they reach the tallest central one, which acts as a key and supports the framework. The only orthostat that remains intact because it resisted being blasted with dynamite is 5.2 m high; it is located just to the left of the only entrance and is a good indicator of the enormous original size of this monumental space. The orthostats were carved in a concave shape and were also placed with a certain inclination towards the central point, in such a way as to facilitate the placement of a now lost, large granite slab that served as a cover for the chamber. On the floor of this room, fragments of the rest of the blocks were preserved, currently located a few meters outside the dolmen.

The chamber and the access corridor are almost twenty meters long and are oriented in an east–west direction. The corridor is divided into three sections: an atrium and two antechambers, well delimited by pairs of vertical slabs on both sides. The atrium next to the entrance is a kind of vestibule with a trapezoidal floor plan, probably originally without a roof, which acts as an access ramp to the first antechamber and perhaps also as a ceremonial space for the deposit of offerings. The two antechambers are linteled structures with a height that varies between 1.1 and 1.6 meters, which narrow slightly as we approach the final chamber.

There are still vestiges of the earthen mound that covered almost the entire described building so it is possible to know its original appearance and dimensions. It has been inferred as an artificial promontory with an elliptical plan, made from reddish earth and a wall of rounded pebbles surrounded the outer edge, acting similar to an annular retaining wall. Its diameter oscillates between 28 and 35 meters, while its current height is 3.5 m, although originally there must have been much more material in the area.

== History ==
The continued use of the dolmen and the various looting it has suffered make it impossible to establish an estimate of the number of corpses it housed, or the characteristics of the complete grave goods. Along with small bone fragments charred by fires, the archaeological excavation of the dolmen provided various objects. These are common trousseau pieces in these collective tombs: spherical or hemispherical ceramic containers, abundant lithic industry carved as knives and flint halberds, a hundred arrowheads of various materials, personal adornment objects such as pendants and necklace beads or two copperheads. Additionally, an interesting slate plaque idol was found, rectangular in shape with rounded edges and incised with decoration on its front face and three upper perforations. Finally, the excavations also provided a large quantity of ocher pieces, probably used in funerary rituals.

All these elements place the creation of this burial by late Neolithic communities, towards the end of the 4th millennium BC or beginnings of the 3rd millennium BC. The site was reused in later Chalcolithic burials throughout the 3rd millennium BC, which is testimony to the enormous durability of the funerary rites associated with megalithism. Even some elements found, such as remains of Beaker pottery, the tips of copper palms or halberds, point to an even later occupation of this corridor tomb.

The megalithic complex has been reused in various historical periods, as it was used as a dwelling in Roman and Medieval times, something that irreversibly affected the burials and grave goods that were originally deposited inside. In the same way, its stone structure has suffered various attacks, such as serving as a quarry and being dynamited at the end of the 19th century, an event that José Ramón Mélida collects in his Monumental Catalog and from which marks such as holes for drill holes or breaking wedges are left in various slabs on the site. Fortunately, its robustness and the fact that these events only affected some parts of the structure, have allowed its imposing original appearance to be imagined even today.

The existence of this dolmen has been known for centuries and there are bibliographical references to it from the end of the 19th century, the oldest of which is due to the scholar Vicente Moreno, who reported its existence in 1875 and stated that it was "one of the rarest and most remarkable monuments of the Stone Age". Mélida visited it in 1908 and 1912, after which she managed to have it declared a National Monument in 1931. In 1950 the geologists Ismael Roso de Luna and Francisco Hernández-Pacheco briefly mentioned it in a geological study of the area, while in 1956 the German archaeologist Georg Leisner and his wife Vera included it in a catalog of dolmens. Its systematic excavation took place between 1957 and 1958 under the direction of the Teruel archaeologist Martín Basch.

== See also ==
- List of Bien de Interés Cultural in the Province of Badajoz
- Alcantara Dolmens

== Sources ==
- Almagro Basch, Martín (1959). "Excavaciones en el sepulcro de corredor megalítico de Lácara, Mérida (Badajoz)" (PDF). Revista de Estudios Extremeños. Diputación Provincial de Badajoz.
- versalita, Martín; versalita, Javier (2000). "Un altar rupestre en el prado de Lácara (Mérida): apuntes para la creación de un parque arqueológico". Extremadura Arqueológica VIII: El Megalitismo en Extremadura (Homenaje a Elías Diéguez Luengo): 423–442.
- VV. AA. (2006). "Mérida". Monumentos artísticos de Extremadura. Vol. II (3ª ed.). Mérida: Editora Regional de Extremadura.
