= List of Bienes de Interés Cultural in the Province of Badajoz =

This is a list of Bien de Interés Cultural landmarks in the Province of Badajoz, Spain.

- Albarregas Roman bridge
- Badajoz Cathedral
- Dolmen del prado de Lácara
- Guadiana Roman bridge
- Monastery of San Isidro de Loriana
- Nuestra Señora de Gracia Parish Church
- Proserpina Dam
- San Lázaro Roman aqueduct
- Turuñelo prehistoric archeological site in Guareña
