= Puente Romano, Mérida =

Roman bridge over the Guadiana River at Mérida, Spain

Puente Romano
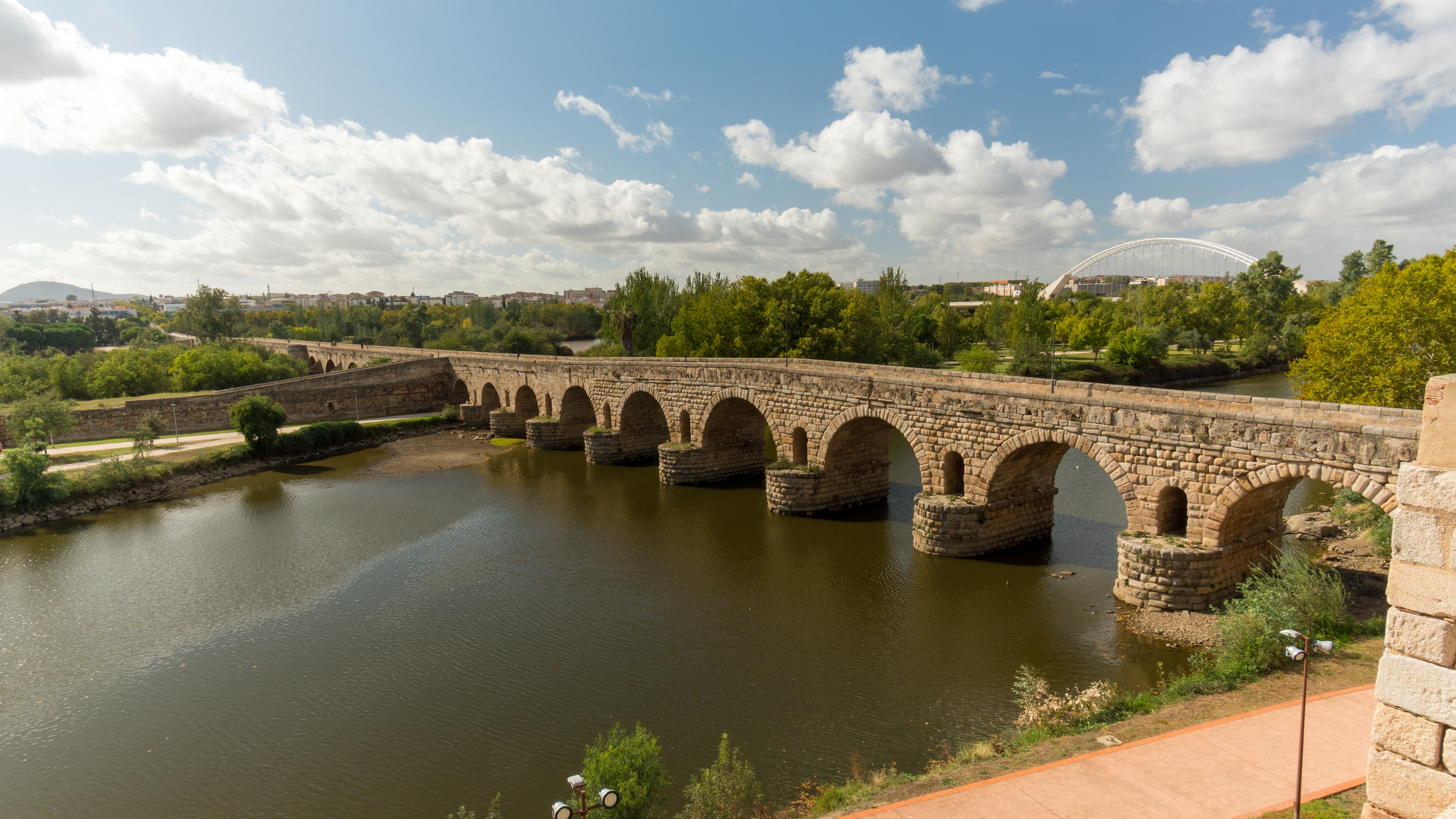
- Puente Romano as seen from the Alcazaba.
- Coordinates: 38°54′47″N 6°21′03″W
- Crosses: Guadiana River
- Locale: Mérida, Spain

Characteristics
- Design: Arch bridge
- Material: Granite ashlar
- Total length: 790 m (incl. approaches)
- Width: Ca. 7.1 m
- Longest span: 11.6 m
- No. of spans: 60 (incl. 3 buried)

History
- Construction end: Reign of Trajan (98–117 AD)

Statistics

UNESCO World Heritage Site
- Official name: Roman Bridge over Guadiana River
- Type: Cultural
- Criteria: iii, iv
- Designated: 1993 (17th session)
- Part of: Archaeological Ensemble of Mérida
- Reference no.: 664-004
- Region: Europe and North America

Spanish Cultural Heritage
- Official name: Puente Romano sobre El Guadiana
- Type: Non-movable
- Criteria: Monument
- Designated: 13 December 1912
- Reference no.: RI-51-0000110

The Puente Romano (Spanish for Roman Bridge) is a Roman bridge over the Guadiana River at Mérida in southwest Spain.

The Puente Romano was built c. First Century CE. It is the world's longest (in terms of distance) surviving bridge from ancient times, having once featured an estimated overall length of 755 m with 62 spans. The piers are designed to withstand river current as they are rounded on the upstream side and square on the downstream side.

Puente Romano has undergone at least two significant restorations: once by Sala, a Visigoth, in 686 and once by Phillip II in 1610. Seventeen arches were destroyed in 1812 as a defensive measure against at attack during the Battle of Badajoz.

Today, there are 60 spans (three of which are buried on the southern bank) on a length of 721 m between the abutments. Including the approaches, the structure totals 790 m. It is still in use, but was pedestrianized in 1991 as road traffic was redirected to use the nearby Lusitania Bridge.

Annexed to the bridge is the Alcazaba of Mérida, a Moorish fortification built in 835.

Close to the remains of the Acueducto de los Milagros, there exists another Roman bridge at Mérida, the much smaller Puente de Albarregas.

== See also ==
- List of Roman bridges
- Roman architecture
- Roman engineering

== Sources ==
- Barroso, Yolanda; Morgado, Francisco (1996). Mérida Patrimonio de la Humanidad. Conjunto monumental (in Spanish). Mérida: Consorcio de la Ciudad Monumental Histórico-Artística y Arqueológica de Mérida.
- O’Connor, Colin (1993), Roman Bridges, Cambridge University Press, pp. 106f. (SP15), ISBN 0-521-39326-4
- Whitney, Charles S. (2003). Bridges of the World: Their Design and Construction (Reprint ed.). Mineola, New York: Dover Publications. ISBN 978-0486429953.
