= Lusitania Bridge =

Bridge in Mérida, Spain

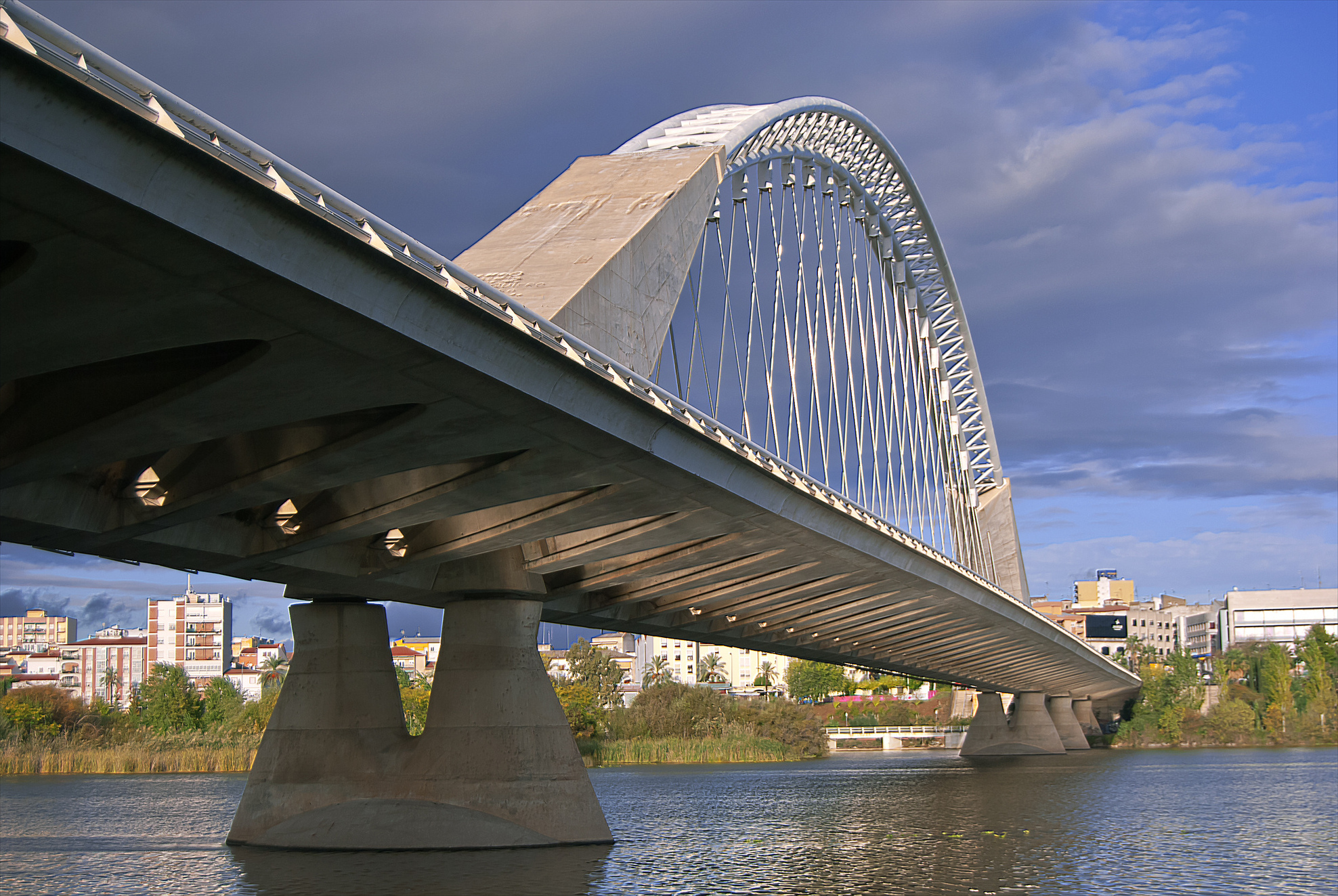
- Coordinates: 38°55′00″N 6°21′14″W
- Crosses: Guadiana
- Locale: Mérida, Spain
- Official name: Lusitania Bridge

Characteristics
- Total length: 465 m (1,525.6 ft)
- Width: 11 m (36.1 ft)
- Longest span: 189 m (620.1 ft)

History
- Opened: 10 December 1991; 34 years ago

Statistics
- Toll: Free on both sides

Location
- Interactive map of Lusitania Bridge

The Lusitania Bridge is a bridge in Mérida, Spain.

== History ==
Lusitania bridge was built over the Guadiana River in 1991 by a Spanish consortium, in order to take the road traffic off from the nearly 2000 years old Roman bridge. The architect was Santiago Calatrava. The bridge takes its name from the fact that Emerita Augusta (present day Merida) was the former capital of Lusitania, an ancient Roman province.

== See also ==
- Guadiana Roman bridge.
- Guadiana International Bridge.
- Our Lady of Help Bridge.
