= San Lázaro Roman aqueduct =

Aqueduct in Mérida, Spain

- Acueducto Romano San Lázaro (Spanish)
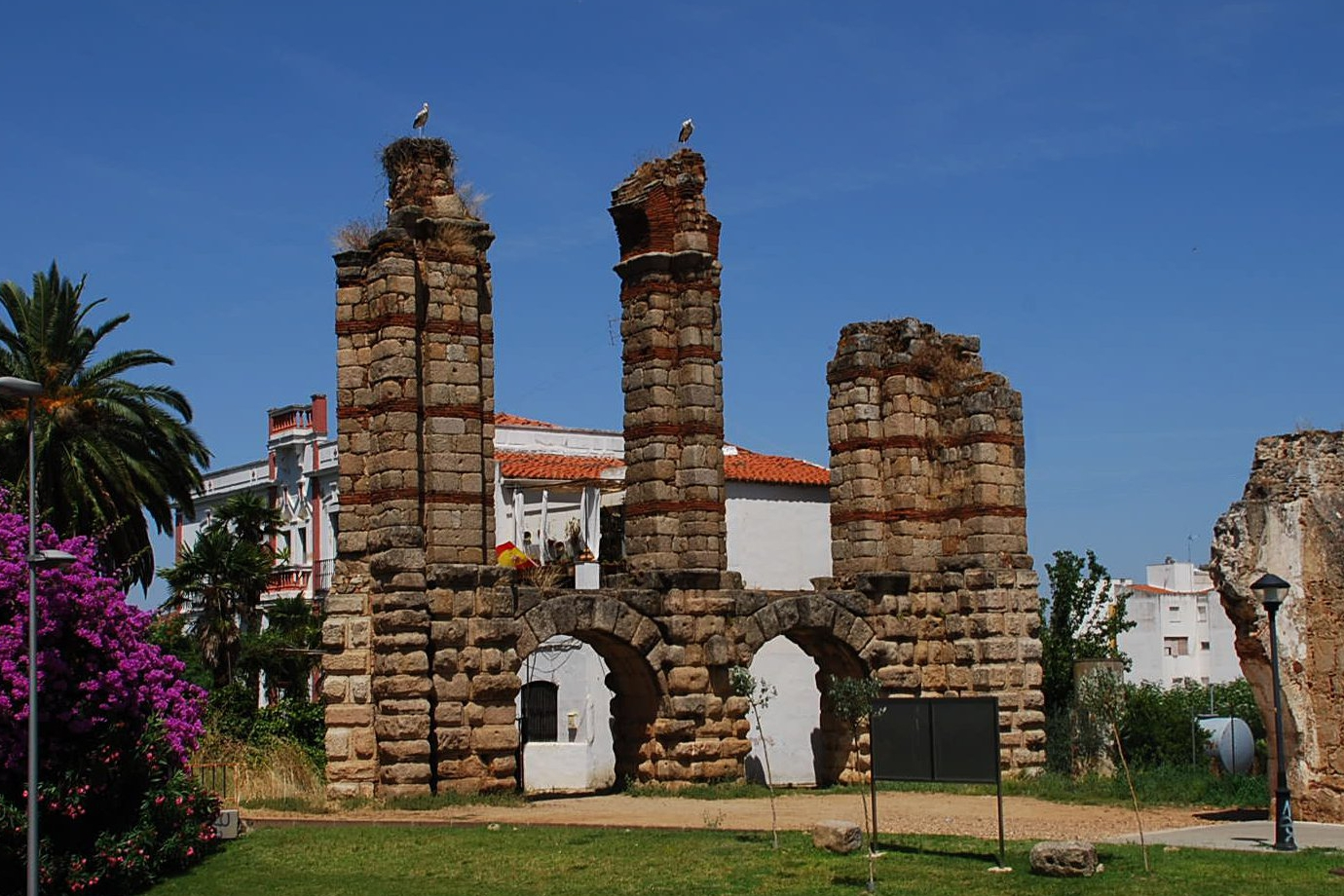
- Interactive map of San Lázaro Roman aqueduct
- 38.920108°N 6.335347°W
- Location: Mérida (Badajoz), Spain

UNESCO World Heritage Site
- Official name: San Lázaro Aqueduct
- Type: Cultural
- Criteria: iii, iv
- Designated: 1993 (17th session)
- Part of: Archaeological Ensemble of Mérida
- Reference no.: 664-002
- Region: Europe and North America

Spanish Cultural Heritage
- Official name: Acueducto Romano San Lázaro
- Type: Non-movable
- Criteria: Monument
- Designated: 13 December 1912
- Reference no.: RI-51-0000113

The San Lázaro Roman aqueduct is a Roman aqueduct in the Roman colonia of Emerita Augusta –present-day Mérida, Spain–, capital of the Roman province of Lusitania. It was built during the first century to supply water into the city.

It was declared Bien de Interés Cultural in 1912. It is part of the Archaeological Ensemble of Mérida, which is one of the largest and most extensive archaeological sites in Spain and that was declared a World Heritage Site by UNESCO in 1993.

== See also ==
- List of Bien de Interés Cultural in the Province of Badajoz
- Ancient Roman buildings and structures in Spain
- List of aqueducts in the Roman Empire
- List of Roman aqueducts by date
- Ancient Roman technology
- Roman engineering
