= Rábanos =

- Municipality and town
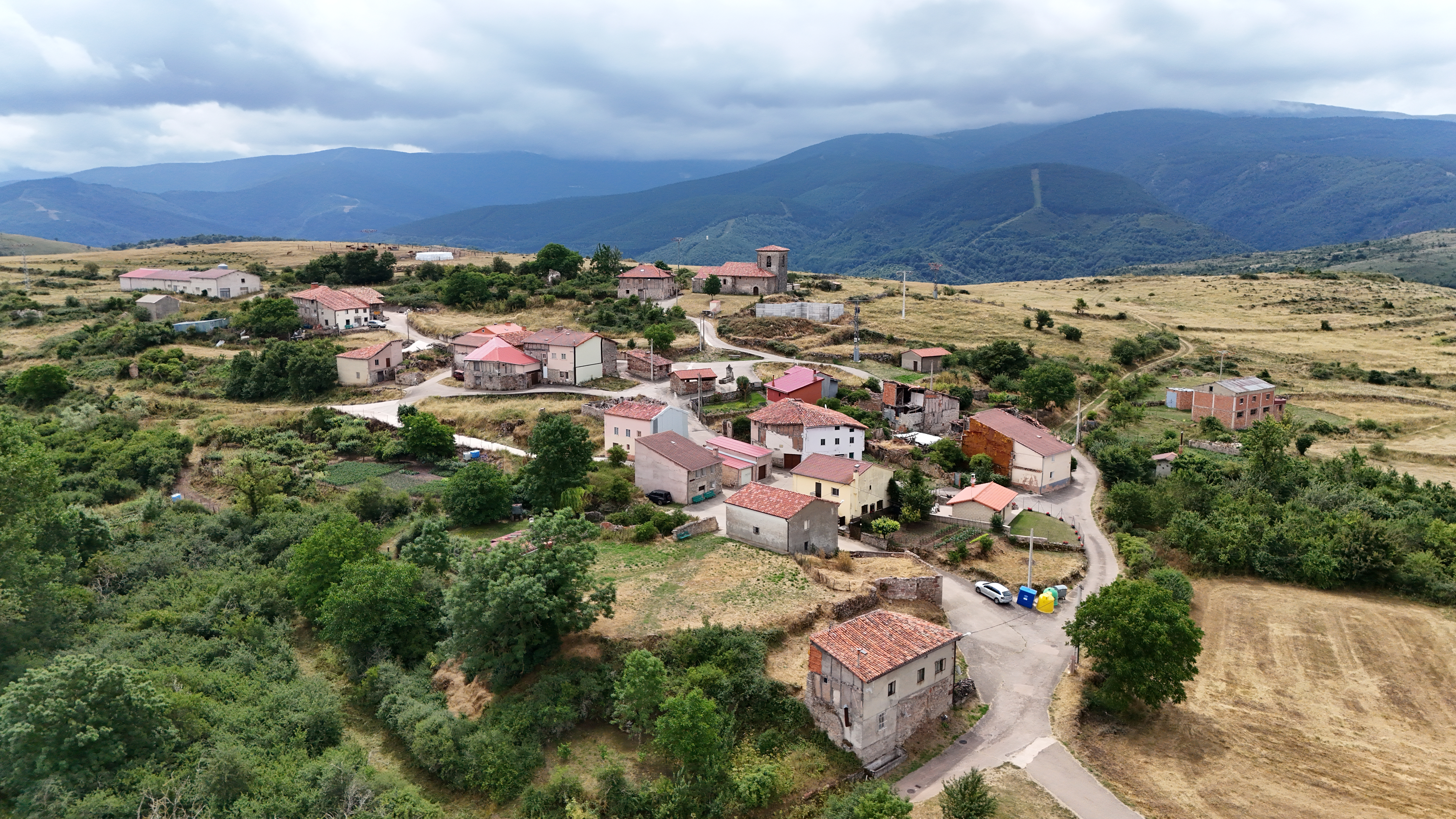
- View of Rábanos

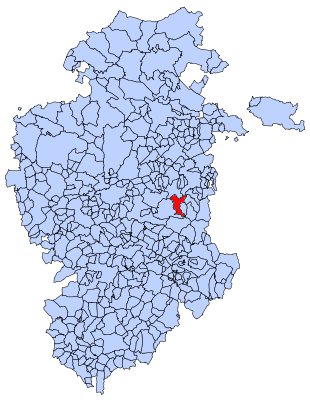
- Municipal location of Rábanos in Burgos province

- Location in Spain
- Coordinates: 42°19′N 3°16′W
- Country: Spain
- Autonomous community: Castile and León
- Province: Burgos
- Comarca: Montes de Oca

Area
  - Total: 40.64 km^{2} (15.69 sq mi)
- Elevation: 1,186 m (3,891 ft)

Population (2025-01-01)
  - Total: 73
  - Density: 1.8/km^{2} (4.7/sq mi)
- Time zone: UTC+1 (CET)
  - Summer (DST): UTC+2 (CEST)
- Postal code: 09268
- Distances: 40 km to Burgos; 4 km to Alarcia
- Website: http://www.rabanos.es/

Rábanos is a municipality and town of northern Spain, Autonomous Community of Castile and León, province of Burgos, Shire of Montes de Oca, sub-shire of Tirón-Rioja Burgalesa.

According to the 2004 census (INE), the municipality has a population of 120 inhabitants (Alarcia town: 82, Rábanos town: 18 and Villamudria village: 20)
