= Acueducto de los Milagros =

Aqueduct in Mérida, Spain

Aqueduct of the Miracles
- Acueducto de los Milagros (Spanish)
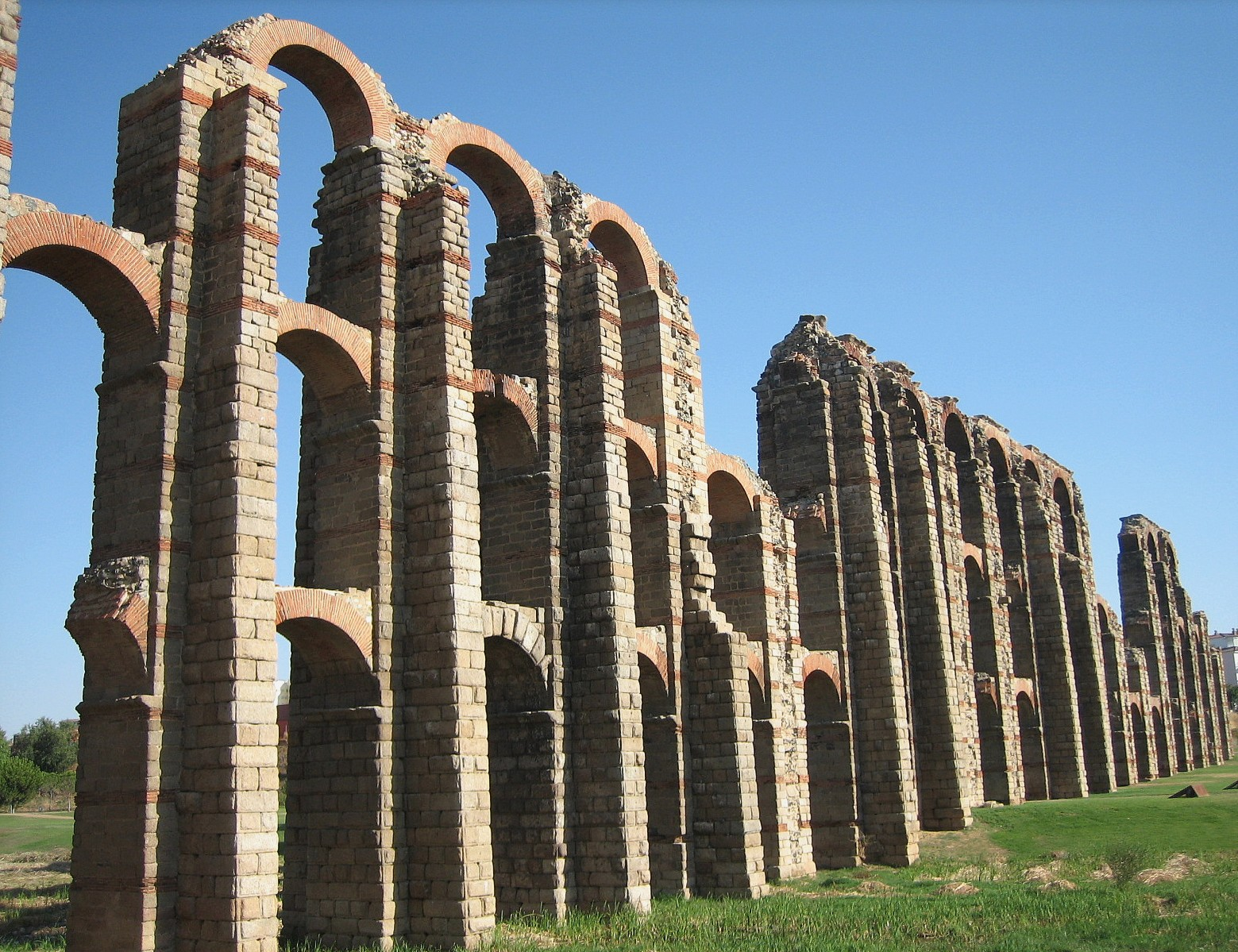
- Aqueduct bridge
- Interactive map of Aqueduct of the Miracles
- 38°55′28″N 6°20′48″W
- Type: Roman aqueduct
- Location: Mérida (Badajoz), Spain

Site notes
- Material: Granite and red brick

UNESCO World Heritage Site
- Official name: Los Milagros Aqueduct
- Type: Cultural
- Criteria: iii, iv
- Designated: 1993 (17th session)
- Part of: Archaeological Ensemble of Mérida
- Reference no.: 664-001
- Region: Europe and North America
- Area: 0.1177 ha (0.291 acres)
- Buffer zone: 20.9 ha (52 acres)

Spanish Cultural Heritage
- Official name: Acueducto Romano "los Milagros"
- Type: Non-movable
- Criteria: Monument
- Designated: 13 December 1912
- Reference no.: RI-51-0000112

The Aqueduct of the Miracles is a Roman aqueduct in the Roman colonia of Emerita Augusta –present-day Mérida, Spain–, capital of the Roman province of Lusitania. It was built during the first century AD to supply water from the Proserpina Dam into the city. After the fall of the Roman Empire, the aqueduct fell into decay and today it is in ruins with only a relatively small section of the aqueduct bridge standing. It is part of the Archaeological Ensemble of Mérida, which is one of the largest and most extensive archaeological sites in Spain and was declared a World Heritage Site by UNESCO in 1993.

== Description ==
Only a relatively small stretch of the aqueduct still stands, consisting of thirty-eight arched pillars standing 25 metres (82 ft) high along a course of some 830 metres (2,720 ft). It is constructed from opus mixtum – granite ashlar blocks interspersed with red brick – utilising a double arcade arrangement. The structure originally brought water to the city from a reservoir called the Proserpina Dam, fed by a stream called Las Pardillas, around 5 km (3.1 mi) to the north-west of Mérida.

It is thought to have been constructed during the 1st century AD, with a second phase of building (or renovations) around 300 AD. In later centuries, the inhabitants of Mérida dubbed it the "Aqueduct of the Miracles" for the awe that it evoked.

The aqueduct was one of three built at Mérida, the other two being the 15 kilometres (9.3 mi) long Aqua Augusta, fed by the Cornalvo reservoir, and San Lázaro, fed by underground channels. The aqueduct is preserved as part of the Archaeological Ensemble of Mérida, a UNESCO World Heritage Site.

In the immediate vicinity, a small Roman bridge called Puente de Albarregas runs parallel to the arcades.

== See also ==
- List of aqueducts in the Roman Empire
- List of Roman aqueducts by date
- Ancient Roman technology
- Roman engineering
