= Roman Forum (Mérida) =

Archaeological area in Mérida, Spain

Roman Forum of Mérida
- Foro romano de Mérida (Spanish)
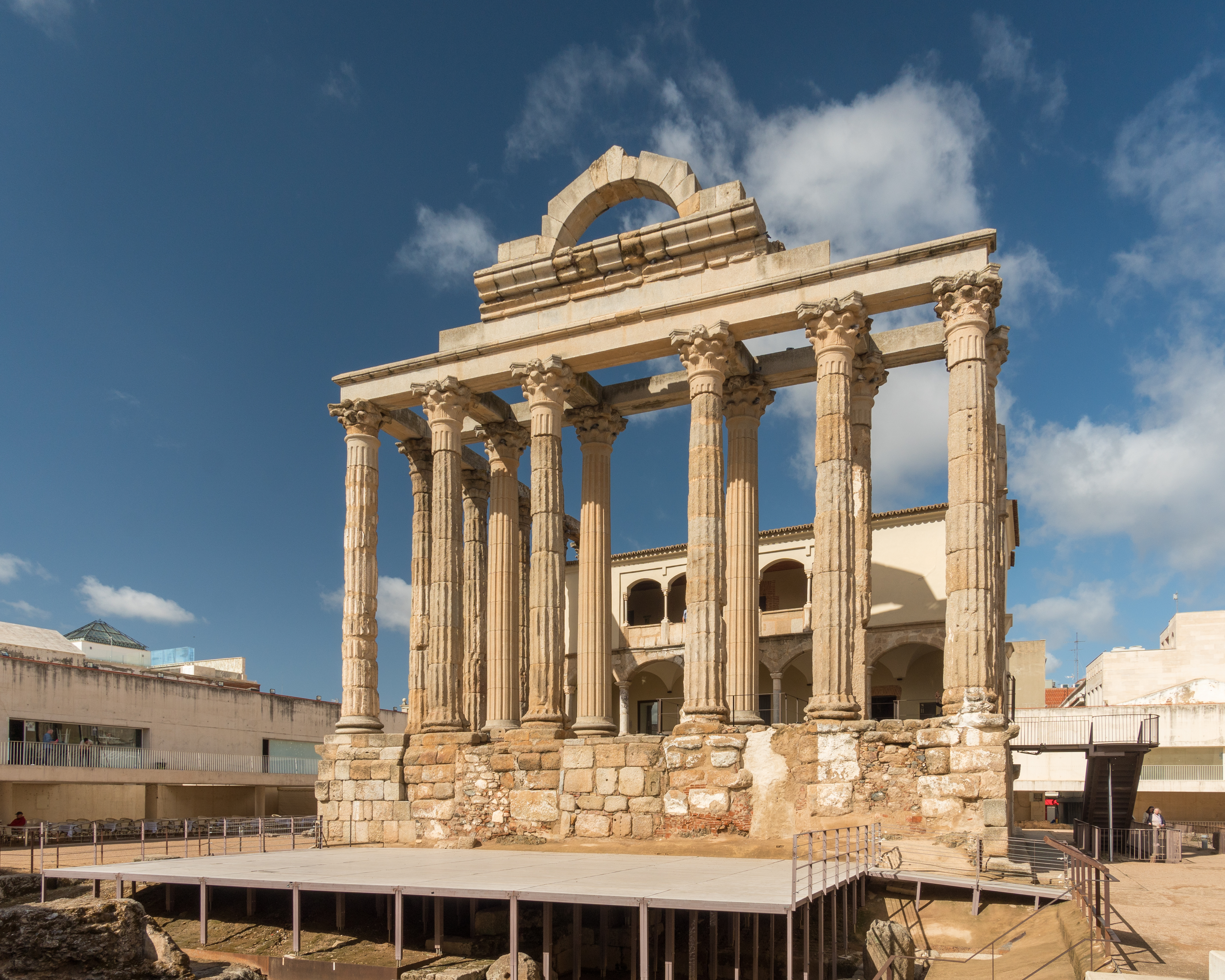
- The Temple of Diana
- Interactive map of Roman Forum of Mérida
- 38°55′01″N 6°20′35.3″W
- Type: Roman Forum
- Location: Mérida (Badajoz), Spain

UNESCO World Heritage Site
- Official name: Local Forum
- Type: Cultural
- Criteria: iii, iv
- Designated: 1993 (17th session)
- Part of: Archaeological Ensemble of Mérida
- Reference no.: 664-015
- Region: Europe and North America

The Roman Forum is an archaeological area in Mérida, Spain. It was the main public area of the Roman city of Emerita Augusta, founded in 25 BC by Emperor Augustus. The city had another forum, the Provincial Forum, built in 50 AD. Together with the other archaeological sites of the city, it was inscribed in the UNESCO World Heritage List in 1993.

Mérida, or Emerita Augusta in Latin, was once the capital of the Lusitania imperial province that included most of Portugal as well as the western central portion of Spain. It contains many common places found in a Roman city: buildings such as theatres, temples, forums, and arenas. Mérida’s ruins are mostly still intact, despite the passage of time of approximately 2,000 years. Mérida preserves more important ancient Roman monuments than any other city in Spain

== Buildings ==
- Temple of Diana. Despite its name, wrongly assigned in its discovery, the building was dedicated to the imperial cult. Erected during Augustus' reign with local granite, later it was partly re-used for the palace of the Count of Corbos.
- Temple of Mars. Dedicated to the imperial cult
- Portico, located near the Temple of Diana, was built in the 1st century. It consists of a porticoed building with a wall housing several niches intended for statues found at this site. The portico was restored in the 20th century, and the discovered remains are on display at the National Museum of Roman Art
- Basilica, located in front of the temple of Diana
- Baths

== See also ==
- National Museum of Roman Art
