= Monastery of San Isidro de Loriana =

Monastery in Mérida, Spain

Monastery of San Isidro de Loriana Church
- Monasterio de San Isidro de Loriana (in Spanish)
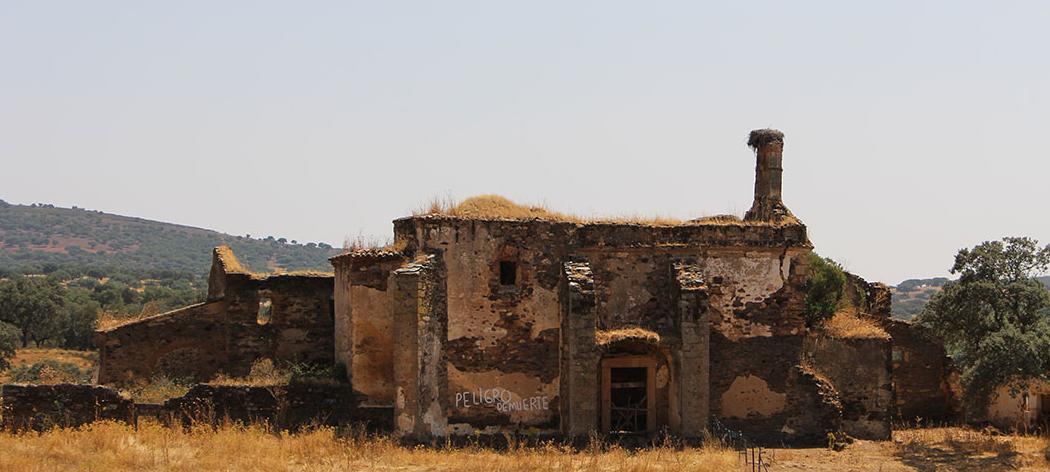

Religion
- Affiliation: Roman Catholic
- Province: Badajoz

Location
- Location: Mérida, Spain
- Interactive map of Monastery of San Isidro de Loriana Church
- Coordinates: 39°8′41.55″N 6°34′26.58″W

Architecture
- Type: Church
- Style: Gothic
- Spanish Cultural Heritage
- Official name: El monasterio de San Isidro de Loriana
- Designated: 12 November 2013
- Reference no.: (R.I.) 51-000005450

The Monastery of San Isidro de Loriana (Spanish: monasterio de San Isidro de Loriana) was a sixteenth-century Franciscan monastery. It is located in the municipality of Mérida, Spain, in Badajoz, in the Cordobilla de Lácara, within the Sierra de San Pedro. The municipalities of La Roca de la Sierra and Puebla de Obando are nearby. San Isidro de Loriana was declared Bien de Interés Cultural on 12 November 2013 in the category of monument. It is an example of Franciscan architecture.

== History ==
=== Initial structure ===
The Monastery of San Isidro de Loriana was erected in 1551 next to the Loriana river under direction of Fray Alonso del Manzanete, a native of the town of Manzanete (now Puebla de Obando). It is located near the Sierra de San Pedro, in the Loriana meadow, in what is now the Vidrio estate. The meadow began to be populated in the sixteenth century and was jurisdictionally attached to La Nava de Santiago. The location takes the name of the nearby stream that waters the area, the Lourianilla or Lorianilla, a tributary of the Alcazaba river. The late eighteenth century Census of Floridablanca places it in Mérida.

The property on which the monastery was built belonged to Juan Velázquez Dávila, who offered to bear the cost of building and maintaining the convent, provided that the building was located on his property. The structure was built on an ancient chapel dedicated to Saint Isidore, believed to have formerly belonged to the Templars. The construction featured a narrow building with a single nave, separated into three sections, which had no more than two small rooms and no cloister. The upper section was divided into seven cells, which included the refectory, a kitchen, an office and the vestry.

Fray Alonso remained Guardian of the Convent for seven years. He was later sent to Rocamadour, Salvatierra de Santiago and Alconchel, where he died in 1569. The Definitorios Provinciales (an entity that makes religious decisions) of 1557 and 1559 were held in the San Isidro de Loriana monastery. In one of those sessions Franciscan friar, San Pedro de Alcántara, was elected Provincial Commissioner.

=== Refurbishment ===
Its location in close proximity to the river resulted in exposure to high humidity and eventual deterioration. The structure was refurbished in 1605 and relocated to safer and higher ground. New construction techniques were employed, that reflected its geographical proximity to the Portuguese border. Indigenous slate material was used in its construction, and involved masonry, brick and ashlar stones. It maintained the simplicity and frugality characteristic of the Franciscan order.

The newly constructed monastery had a small 5x5 meter central cloister with eight Tuscan order granite columns supporting eight arches. This formed the lower gallery of the courtyard. The upper gallery was composed of an equal number of arcs. A granite well made of square curbstone was built indoors in the center of the courtyard. There is also an upper floor where the bedrooms of the Franciscans were located.

The interior features a dining area, a barrel vault made of brick, an interior courtyard, a choir in the church and more bedrooms. Towards the southeast there are a series of swinging buttress double doors that lead into the aisle. The church is small and is attached to the cloister. There are other rooms around the cloister including the refectory, choir, sacristy, library, corridors and twelve cells.

== Abandonment ==
The Loriana meadow was first populated in the thirteenth century by the Order of Santiago and later by small hamlets that emerged alongside the convent in the sixteenth century. The monastery of Loriana had a significant impact on the history of Lácara and was a fundamental part of the town of Loriana. Documentary sources from Puebla de Obando, Lobón, Roca de la Sierra, La Nava de Santiago, Torremayor, Montijo and Puebla de la Calzada point to the presence of the Loriana Franciscans at festivities and other important religious celebrations.

The importance of the monastery declined over time due in part to damages suffered during the Portuguese Restoration War and the War of the Spanish Succession that, between 1640 and the early 1700s, affected border areas of Baja Extremadura, including communities in Alburquerque and Badajoz. According to tradition, the monastery was a place of refuge for nearby towns.

By the mid-eighteenth century the area was unpopulated, as indicated in the Catastro of Ensenada, although the Franciscan monastery was still functional, occupied by a community of eighteen monks and three lay minors. In the nineteenth century the monastery was damaged during the Spanish War of Independence. A few years later, Ecclesiastical Confiscations of Mendizábal laws resulted in the final abandonment of the monastery by the friars in 1841.

After the departure of the Franciscans the building passed into private hands and several farmhouses were built nearby. Now located on private property with restricted access, the monastery is completely abandoned and was formerly used as a warehouse or for keeping livestock. The structure is in an advanced state of ruin, and threatening to collapse. As a result of its poor condition it was included on the Red List of Endangered Spanish Heritage Sites (Lista roja de patrimonio en peligro), a list compiled and maintained by the Hispania Nostra foundation.
