= Alcazaba of Mérida =

Ninth-century Muslim fortification in Mérida, Spain

Coordinates: 38°54′52″N 6°20′48″W

- Alcazaba de Mérida (Spanish)
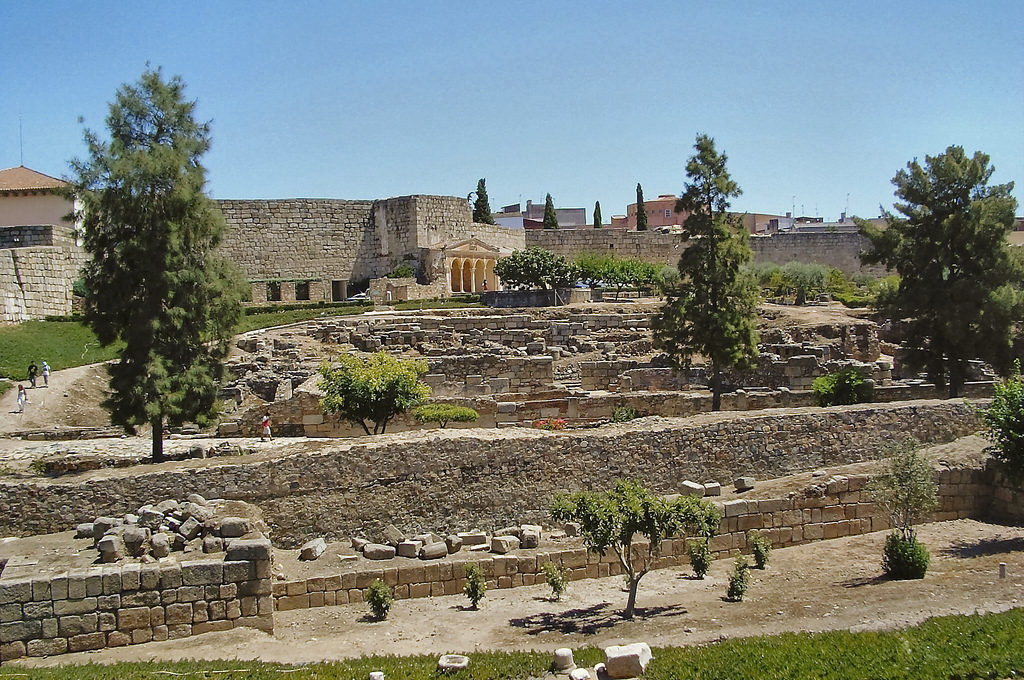
- Interactive map of Alcazaba of Mérida
- Type: Alcazaba
- Location: Mérida (Badajoz), Spain

UNESCO World Heritage Site
- Official name: Alcazaba
- Type: Cultural
- Criteria: iii, iv
- Designated: 1993 (17th session)
- Part of: Archaeological Ensemble of Mérida
- Reference no.: 664-004
- Region: Europe and North America

Spanish Cultural Heritage
- Official name: Alcazaba-conventual
- Type: Non-movable
- Criteria: Monument
- Designated: 13 December 1912
- Reference no.: RI-51-0000124

The Alcazaba of Mérida is a ninth-century Muslim fortification in Mérida, Spain. Like other historical edifices in the city, it is part of the UNESCO Heritage List.

Located near the Roman bridge over the Guadiana river, the Puente Romano, it was built by emir Abd ar-Rahman II of Córdoba in 835 to command the city, which had rebelled in 805. It was the first Muslim alcazaba (a type of fortification in the Iberian peninsula), and includes a big squared line of walls, every side measuring 130 metres in length, 10 m of height and 2.7 m thickness, built re-using Roman walls and Roman-Visigothic edifices in granite. The walls include 25 towers with quadrangular base, which also served as counterforts. Inside is an aljibe, a rainwater tank including a cistern to collect and filter water from the river.

The Alcazaba is accessed from the Puente Romano through a small enclosure, traditionally known Alcarazejo. This was used to check the traffic of pedestrians and goods to the city. Annexed is the military area, whose gate is flanked by two towers; over the horseshoe-shaped arc is an inscription celebrating Abd ar-Rahman's patronage of the work.

Also annexed to the Alcazaba was a convent of the Order of Santiago, currently home to the council of the Extremadura community.

The fortress has yielded other excavated areas containing remnants predating its construction. These include a well-preserved segment of a Roman road, which also extends to the Morerías Archaeological Area, and an urban Roman dwelling that has undergone multiple renovations and faces the same street. Additionally, a portion of the Roman wall is visible, adjacent to a powerful buttress constructed using recycled granite fragments. Similar to the Morerías Archaeological Area, this buttress is believed to date back to the fifth century AD.

== Gallery ==
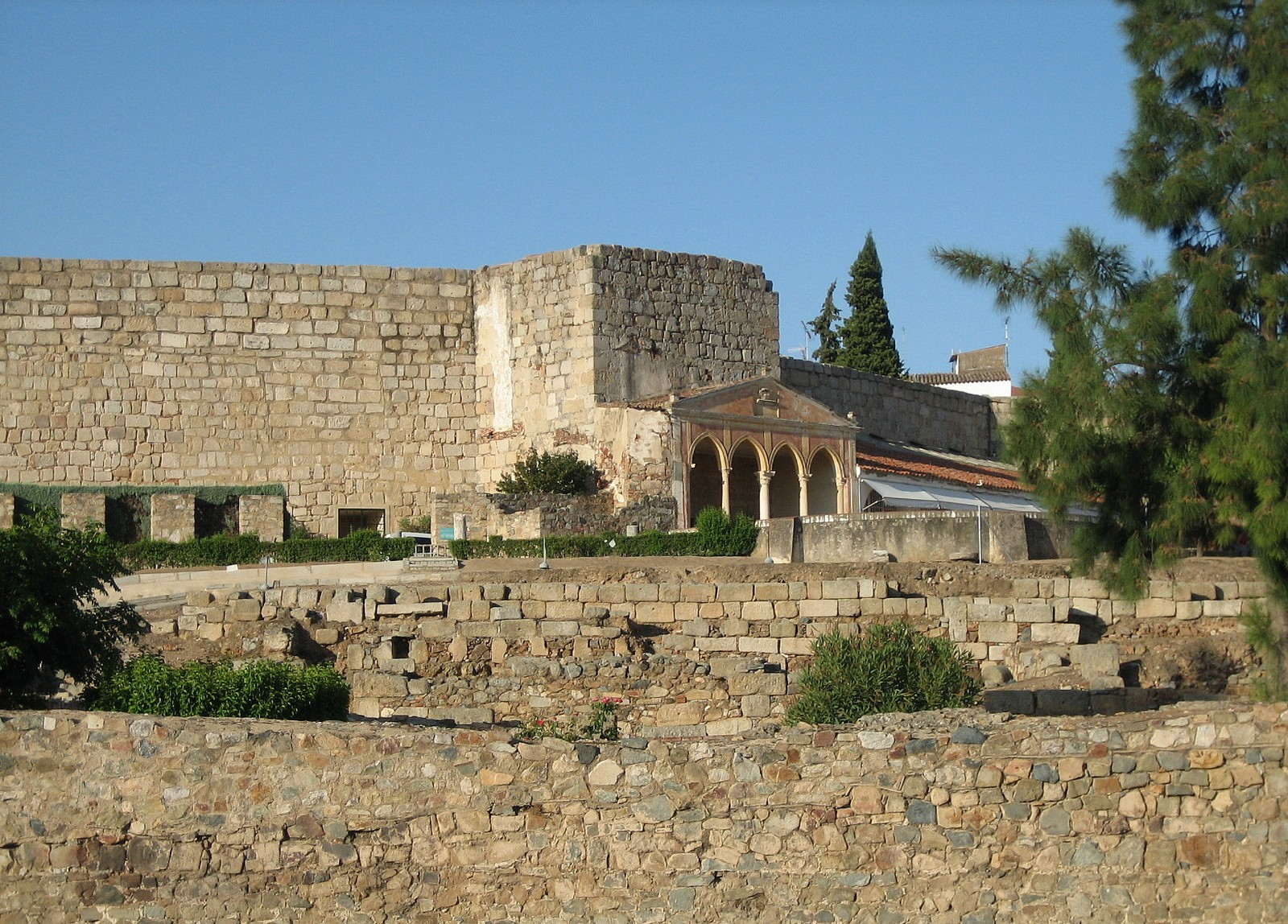

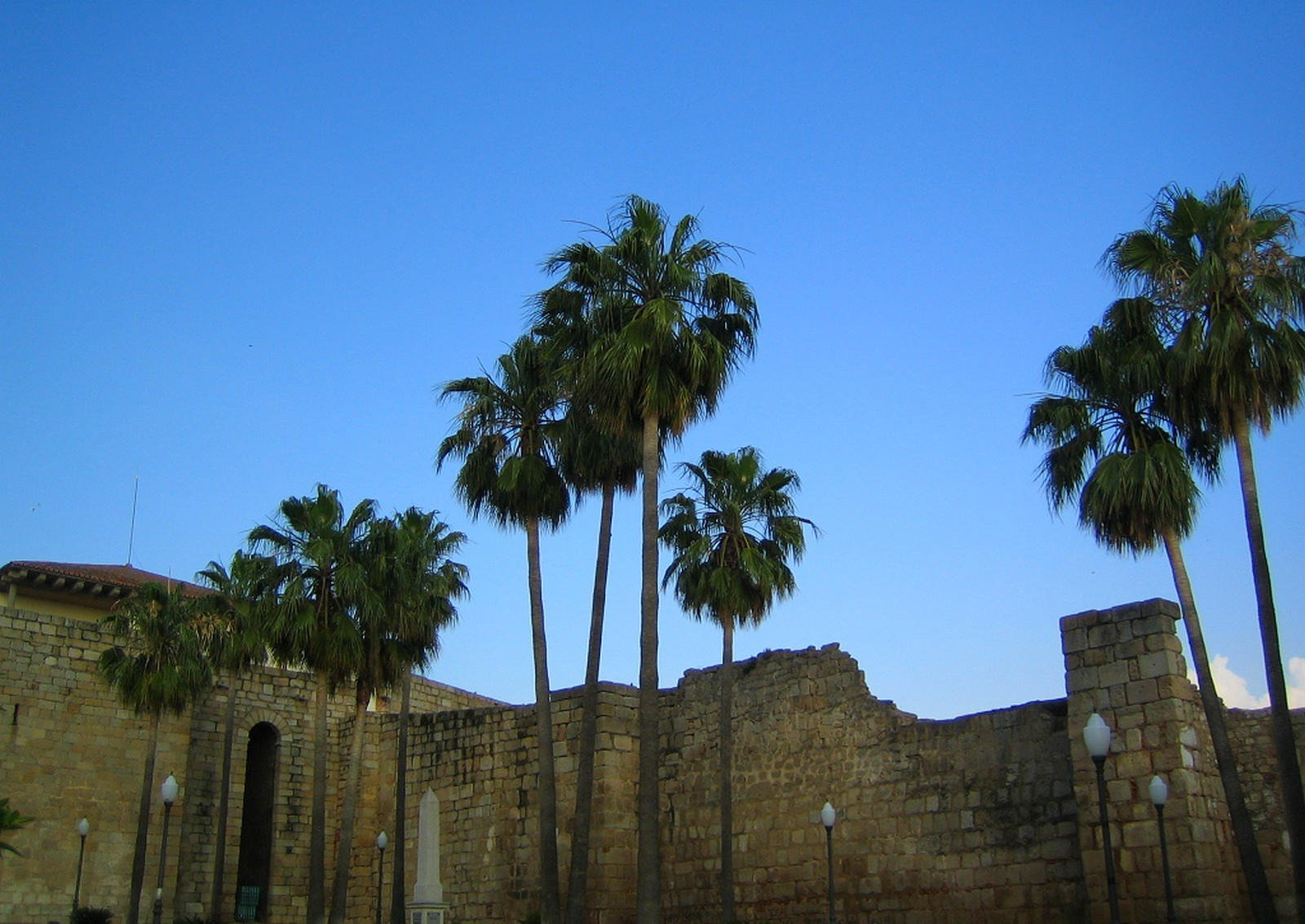
