= Proserpina Dam =

Roman dam in Mérida, Spain

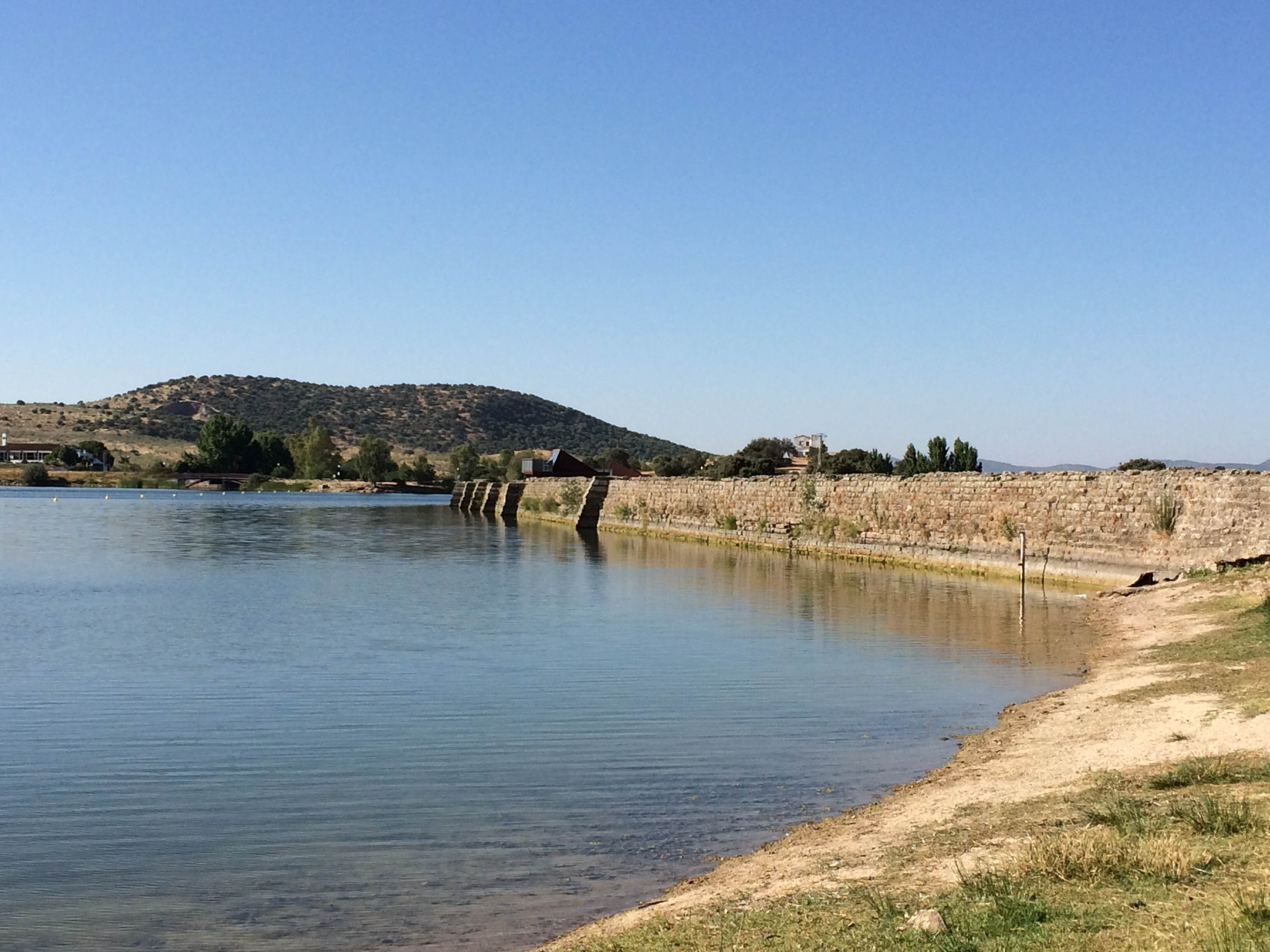
- Location: Mérida (Badajoz), Spain
- Coordinates: 38.969544°N 6.366433°W
- Opening date: 1st–2nd century

Dam and spillways
- Impounds: Las Pardillas (Guadiana basin)
- Height: 12 m (39 ft)
- Length: 427.8 m (1,404 ft)
- Width (base): 5.9 m (19 ft)

UNESCO World Heritage Site
- Official name: Proserpina Dam
- Type: Cultural
- Criteria: iii, iv
- Designated: 1993 (17th session)
- Part of: Archaeological Ensemble of Mérida
- Reference no.: 664-014
- Region: Europe and North America

Spanish Cultural Heritage
- Official name: Pantano de Proserpina
- Type: Non-movable
- Criteria: Monument
- Designated: 13 December 1912
- Reference no.: RI-51-0000114

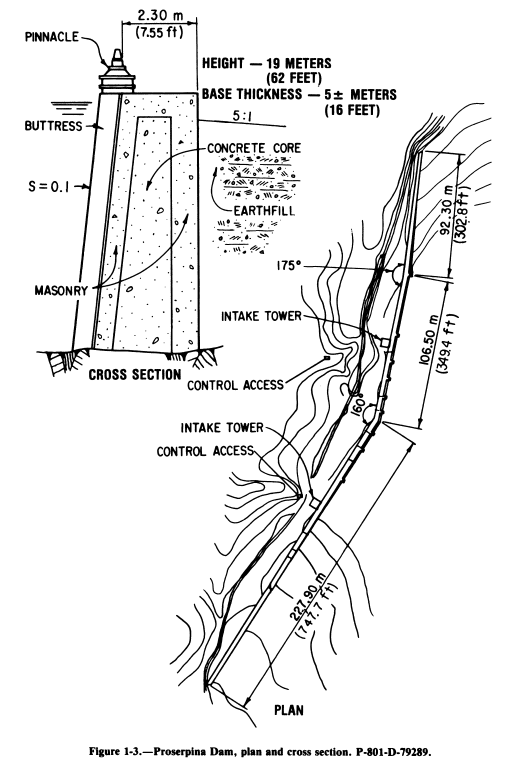
Proserpina Dam, plan and cross-section

The Proserpina Dam is a Roman gravity dam built to supply water to the Roman colonia of Emerita Augusta –present-day Mérida, Spain–, capital of the Roman province of Lusitania. It was built in the 1st–2nd century AD as part of the infrastructure which supplied water to the city through the aqueduct of the Miracles. After the fall of the Roman Empire, the aqueduct fell into decay, but the earth dam with retaining wall is still in use.

Nowadays the dam and the remains of the aqueduct are part of the Archaeological Ensemble of Mérida, which is one of the largest and most extensive archaeological sites in Spain and that was declared a World Heritage Site by UNESCO in 1993.

== See also ==
- List of Roman dams and reservoirs
- Roman architecture
- Roman engineering
- List of Bien de Interés Cultural in the Province of Badajoz
