= Roman Provincial Forum (Mérida) =

Trajan's Arch, Concordia Temple
UNESCO World Heritage Site
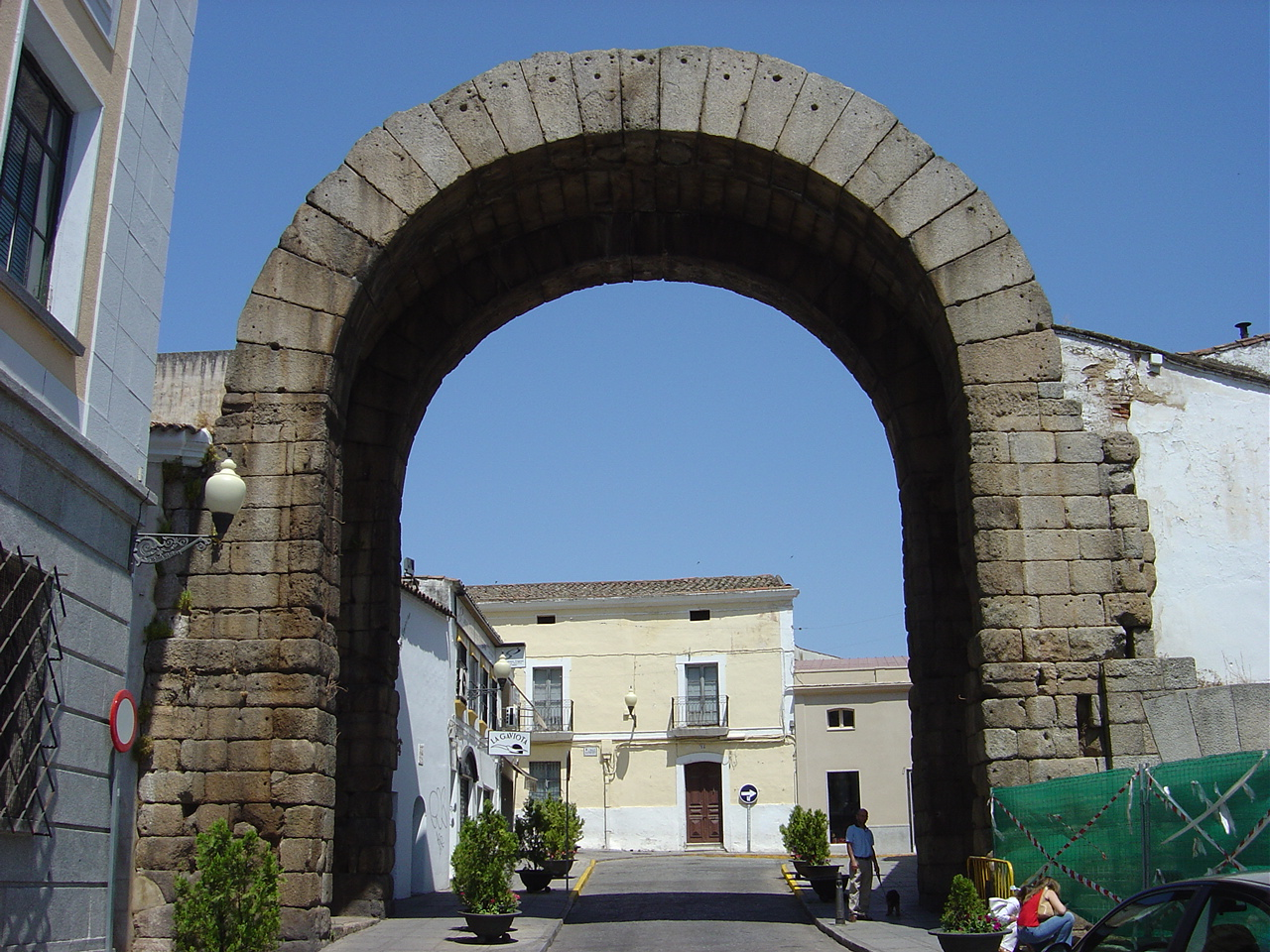
- Trajan's Arch

- Location within Extremadura Location within Spain
- Location: Mérida, Extremadura, Spain
- Part of: Archaeological Ensemble of Mérida
- Criteria: Cultural: (iii)(iv)
- Reference: 664-006
- Inscription: 1993 (17th Session)
- Area: 0.7827 ha (1.934 acres)
- Buffer zone: 20.87 ha (51.6 acres)
- Coordinates: 38°55′9.85″N 6°20′42.82″W

The Roman Provincial Forum is an archaeological area in Mérida, Spain, built in the 1st century AD. It was a public area of the Roman city of Emerita Augusta, founded in 25 BC. The title of "provincial" came from the city's role as the capital of the province of Lusitania. Together with the Roman Forum and other Roman edifices in the city, it was inscribed in the UNESCO World Heritage List in 1993.

The temple received a massive marble decoration during the reign of the emperor Claudius.

== Description ==
The Forum consisted of a large square sided by a monumental portico, with a large temple in the center, which was accessed through the Arch of Trajan.

Edifices included:

- triumphal Arch of Tiberius, situated at the end of the cardo maximus (the main road of Emerita Augusta). Built of granite, it is 13.97 m. It was originally covered with marble.
- a temple built under the reign of Tiberius
