= Vicente Barrantes Moreno =

Spanish bibliophile and poet

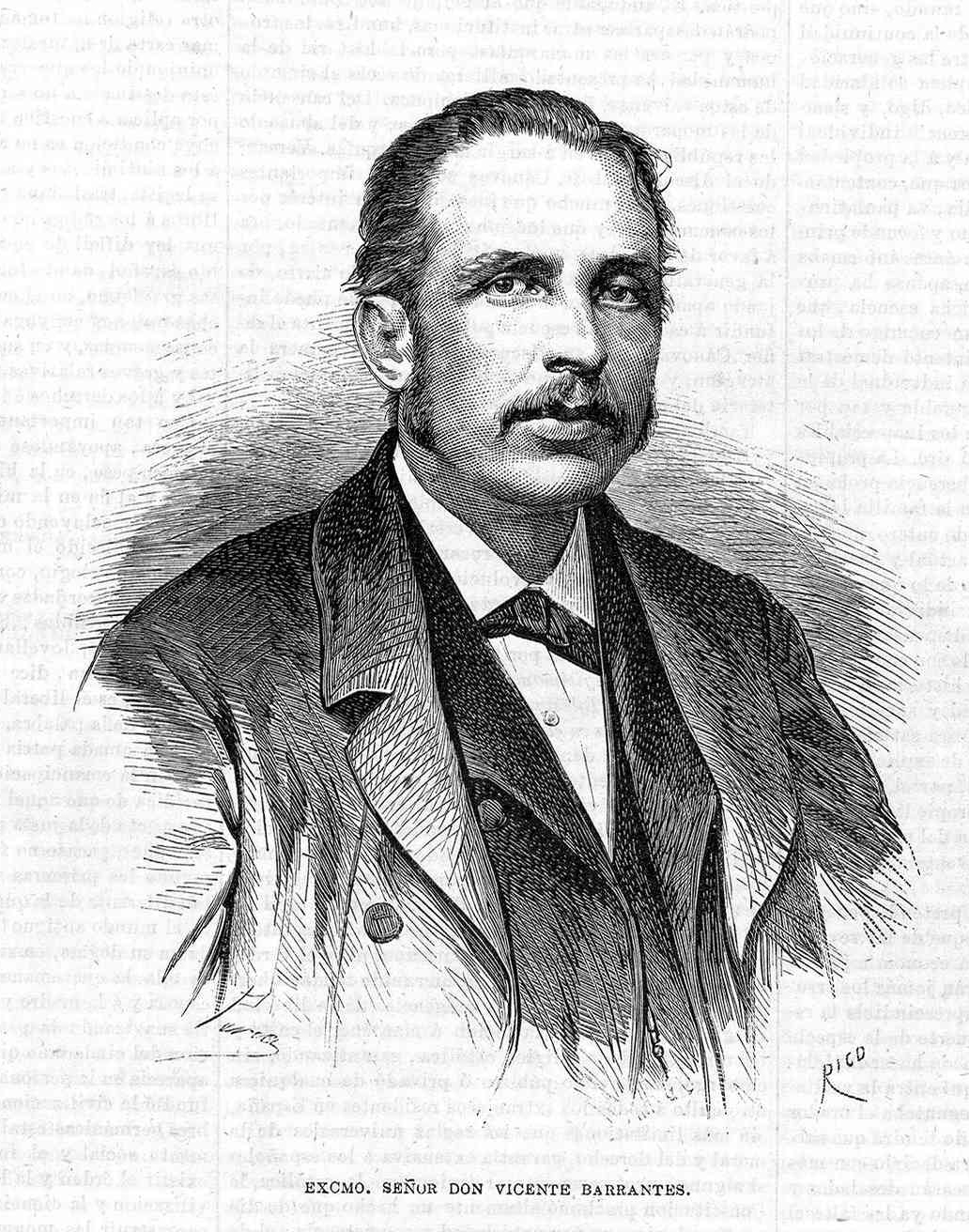

Vicente Barrantes (1829, Badajoz – 1898) was a Spanish bibliophile, poet and writer.

== Criticism by Rizal ==
Jose Rizal, the national hero of the Philippines, wrote two letters addressing Barrantes' criticism of the Noli Me Tángere and the Tagalog theater.

== Narrative works ==
- Juan de Padilla Madrid, p. I, 1855, p. II, 1856 (Imp of Ramon Campuzano), historical novel.
- Always late, Madrid, 1852 (C. Gonzalez), original novel, reprinted in Madrid (Printing of Alhambra and Company) 1862.
- Padilla's widow Madrid, 1857 (Impr. Gabriel Alhambra), historical novel.
- Narratives Extremadura Madrid, 1873 (Imp of J. Peña)
- Tales and legends Madrid, 1875 (P. Muñez)
- The popular narrative veinteicuatro Cordoba Cordoba (Imp and lib. D. Rafael Arroyo), 1859.
- The soldier's beloved, New York, novels collection Chronicle (1848–1851)
- A literary suicide. She Spain.
- The court poets. Historical novel of 1619.
- Don Rodrigo Calderon. Historical novel, serial, published in The Enlightenment, 1851–1852.
