= La Roca de la Sierra =

- Municipality
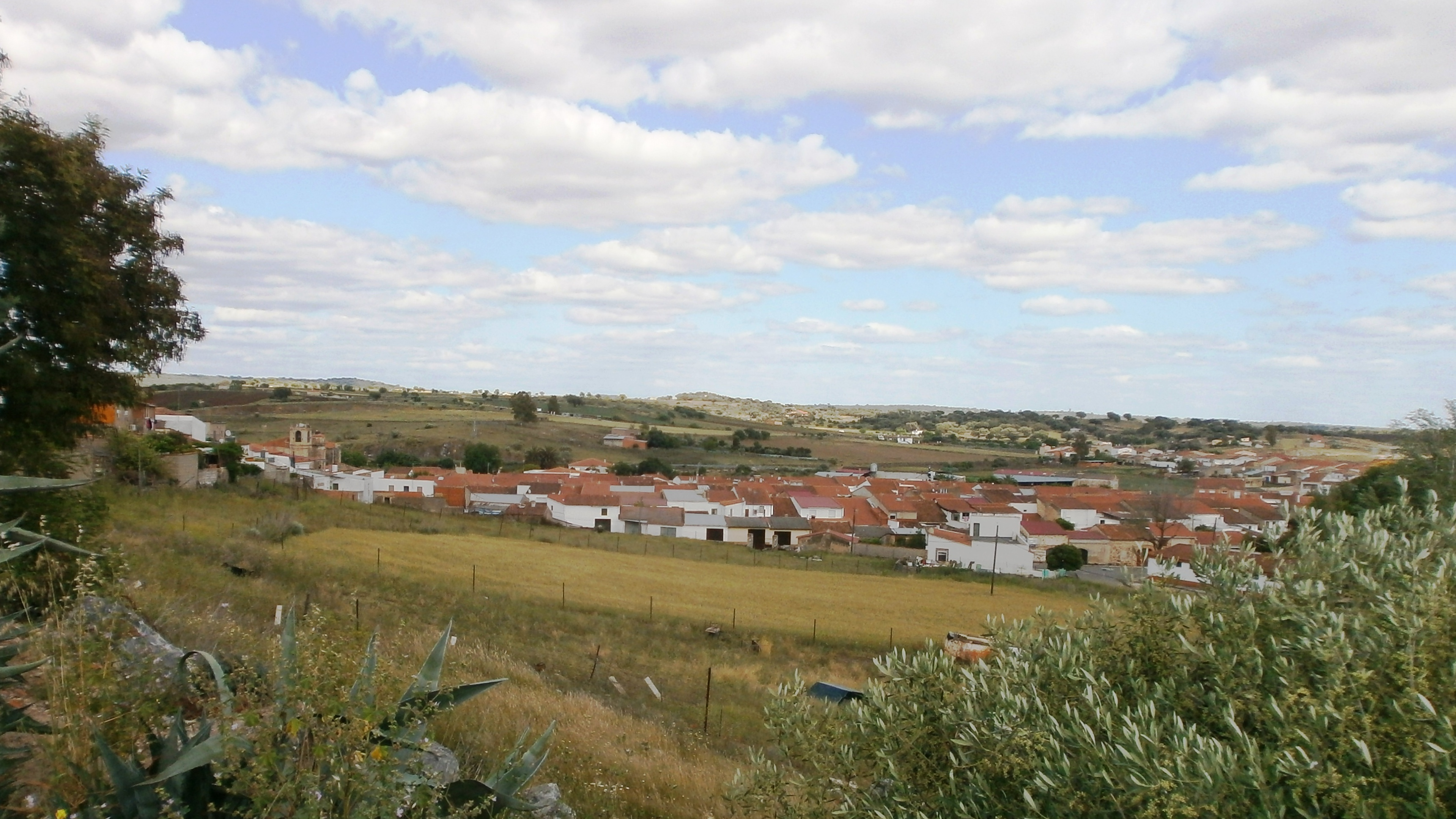

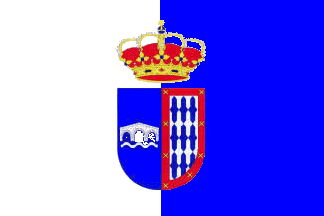
- Flag Coat of arms

- Location in Spain
- Coordinates: 39°6′33″N 6°41′25″W
- Country: Spain
- Autonomous Community: Extremadura
- Province: Badajoz
- Comarca: Tierra de Mérida - Vegas Bajas

Government
  - Mayor: Alfonso González Almunia (IU)

Area
  - Total: 110 km^{2} (42 sq mi)
- Elevation (AMSL): 248 m (814 ft)

Population (2025-01-01)
  - Total: 1,454
  - Density: 13/km^{2} (34/sq mi)
- Time zone: UTC+1 (CET)
  - Summer (DST): UTC+2 (CEST (GMT +2))
- Postal code: 06190
- Area code: +34 (Spain) + 924 (Badajoz)
- Website: www.larocadelasierra.es

La Roca de la Sierra is a municipality in the province of Badajoz, Extremadura, Spain. It has a population of 1,579 and an area of 108.58 km^{2}. It is the location of the Monastery of San Isidro de Loriana, a Bien de Interes Cultural in a state of ruin.

== See also ==
- List of municipalities in Badajoz
