= Albarregas Roman bridge =

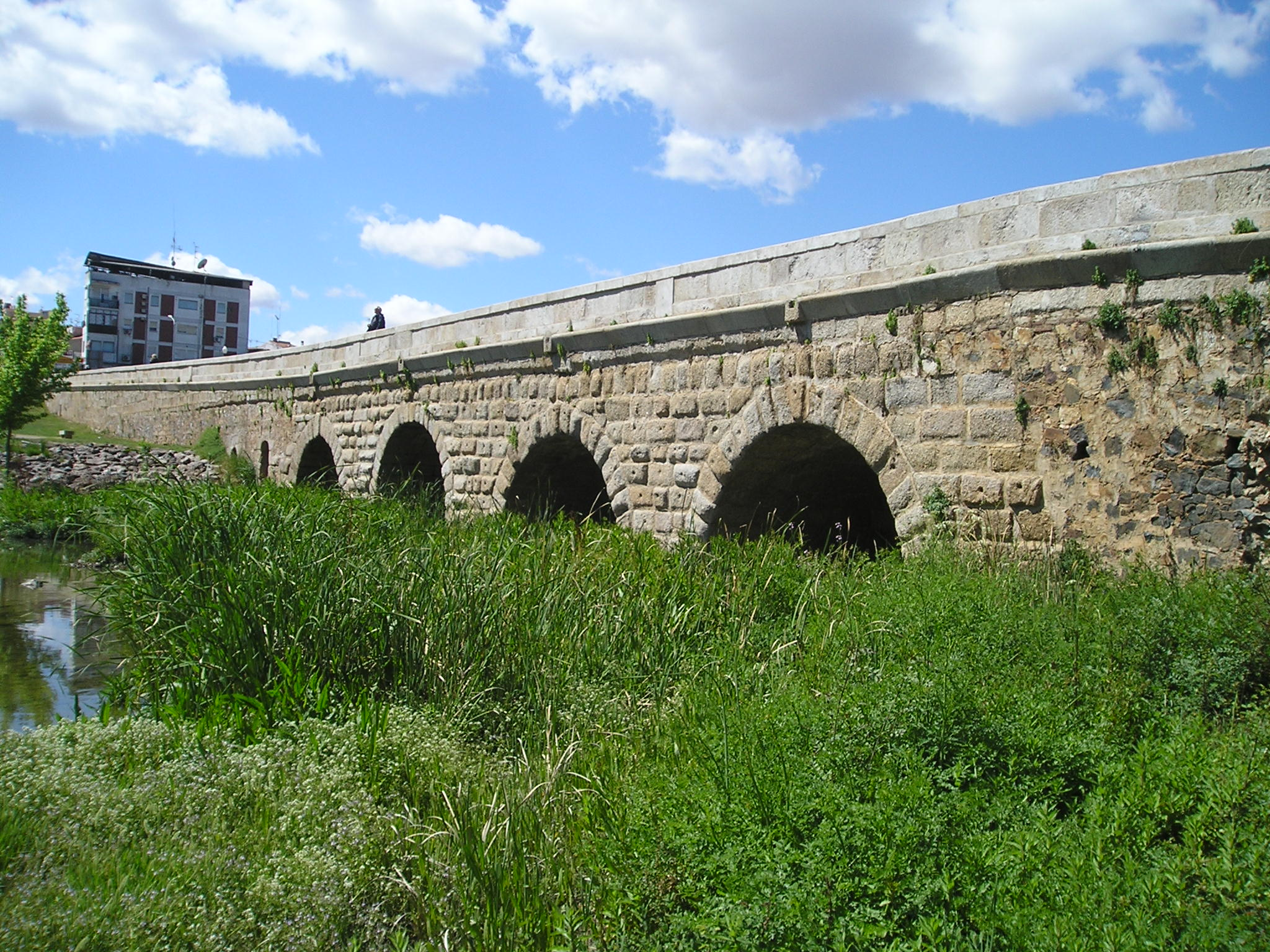
- Coordinates: 38.923464°N 6.349177°W
- Locale: Mérida, Spain

Statistics

UNESCO World Heritage Site
- Official name: Roman Bridge over Albarregas River
- Type: Cultural
- Criteria: iii, iv
- Designated: 1993 (17th session)
- Part of: Archaeological Ensemble of Mérida
- Reference no.: 664-019
- Region: Europe and North America

Spanish Cultural Heritage
- Official name: Puente Romano sobre El Albarregas
- Type: Non-movable
- Criteria: Monument
- Designated: 13 December 1912
- Reference no.: RI-51-0000111

The Albarregas Roman bridge (Spanish: Puente Romano sobre El Albarregas) is a Roman bridge located in Mérida, Spain. The bridge, which is built of granite, crosses the river Albarregas, a tributary of the Guadiana. It is part of the Vía de la Plata.

It has been protected since 1912. It is a Bien de Interés Cultural and part of a World Heritage Site.

== History ==
This bridge was constructed around the same time as the other Roman bridge in the city, the one that spans the Guadiana River, towards the end of the 1st century BC, during the reign of Emperor Augustus. It marked the northern exit of the city, where one had to cross the Albarregas River. It was an extension of the cardo maximus of the Roman city, one of its two main streets. Here began the important road from Emerita to Asturicam, known as the ab Emerita Asturicam (Vía de la Plata), extending up to Astorga, as well as another road leading west to Olissipo, present-day Lisbon. The bridge runs parallel to the nearby Acueducto de los Milagros.

== See also ==
- List of Bien de Interés Cultural in the Province of Badajoz
