= Villasur de Herreros =

Coordinates: 42°19′N 3°23′W

- municipality
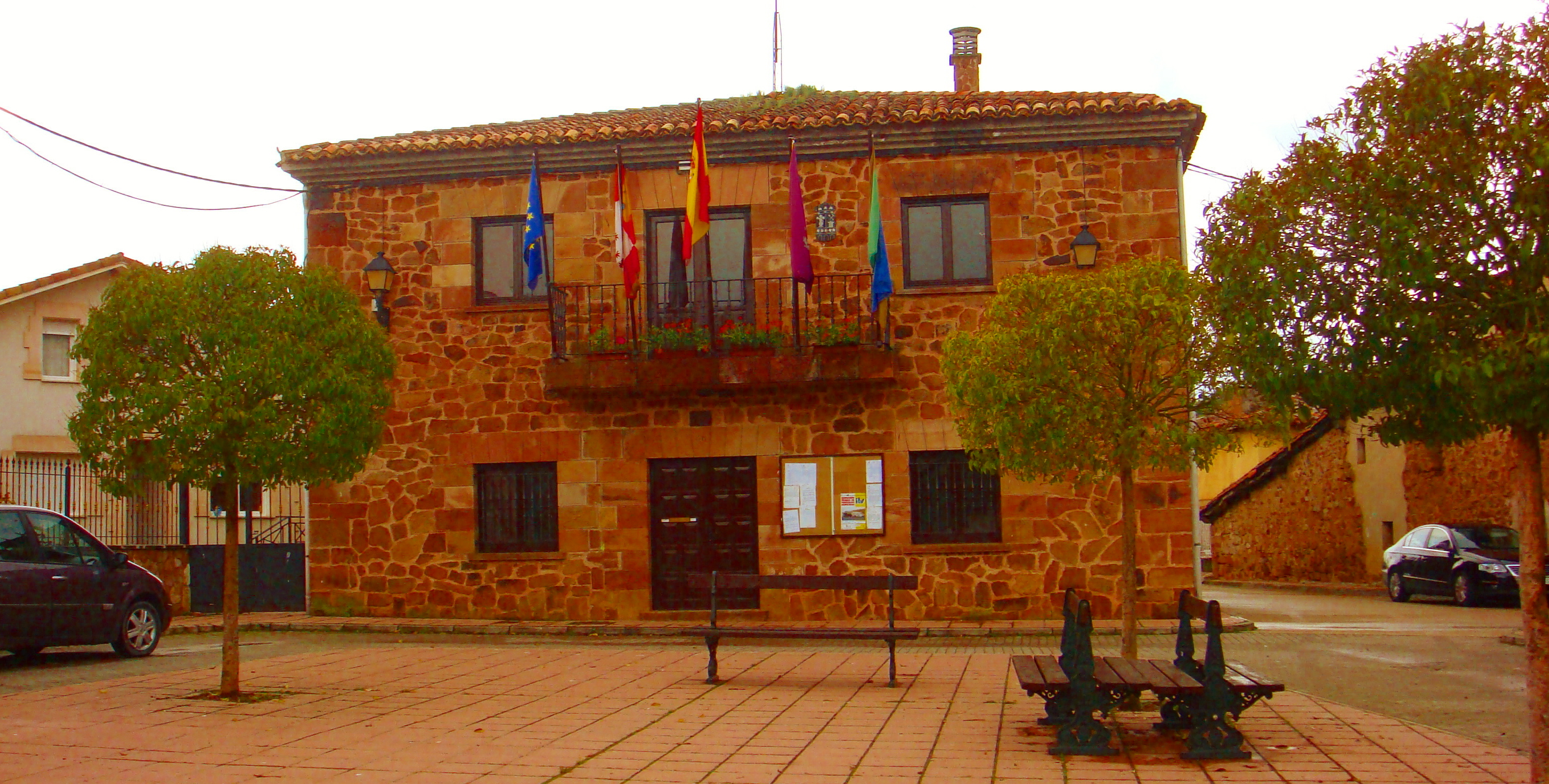
- Town hall of Villasur de Herreros

- Coat of arms
- Interactive map of Villasur de Herreros
- Country: Spain
- Autonomous community: Castile and León
- Province: Burgos

Area
  - Total: 87 km^{2} (34 sq mi)

Population (2025-01-01)
  - Total: 269
  - Density: 3.1/km^{2} (8.0/sq mi)
- Time zone: UTC+1 (CET)
  - Summer (DST): UTC+2 (CEST)
- Website: http://www.villasur.org

Villasur de Herreros is a municipality located in the province of Burgos, Castile and León, Spain.

According to the 2004 census (INE), the municipality had a population of 318 inhabitants.
