= Census of Floridablanca =

First Spanish census using modern techniques

The census of Floridablanca is considered the first Spanish census of population prepared on modern statistics techniques. It was a census document produced in Spain under the direction of the count of Floridablanca, minister of Charles III, between 1785 and 1787.
