= List of Roman sites in Spain =

This is a list of existing Roman sites in Spain.

== Altars ==
- Roman altar of Arcos de la Frontera
- Temple of Diana
- Votive Altar of San Esteban de Toral
- Baelo Claudia

== Archaeological sites ==
- Archaeological Ensemble of Acinipo
- Almoina Archaeological Centre
- Cabezo Ladrero
- Roman ruins of Calduba
- Archaeological site of Can Modolell
- Archaeological Park of Carranque
- Archaeological site of Cercadilla
- Archaeological site of Cimadevilla
- Archaeological site of l'Esquerda
- Archaeological site of San Roque
- Archaeological site of Santa Eulalia
- Archaeological site of Saucedo (Caesarobriga)
- Archaeological Park of Segóbriga
- Casa de Orfeo
- Casa romana de la calle Añón de Zaragoza
- Castro Bergidum
- Cova de les Dones
- Iturissa
- Ilíberis
- Merida
- Pollentia

== Amphitheatres ==
- Astorga Amphitheatre - Asturica Augusta 42°27′26″N 6°3′49″W
- Amphitheatre of Empuries 42°7′48″N 3°7′2″E
- Espejo Amphitheatre - Ucubi 37°41′2″N 4°33′15″W
- Amphitheatre of Carthago Nova 37°36′2″N 0°58′48″W
- Ciavieja Amphitheatre 36°46′33″N 2°48′1″W
- Amphitheatre of Astigi (Écija) 37°32′12″N 5°5′8″W
- Amphitheatre of Carmona 37°28′10″N 5°39′2″W
- Amphiteatre of Córdoba 37°53′2″N 4°47′19″W
- Caparra Amphitheatre - Capera 40°9′51″N 6°5′59″W
- Coruna del Conde Amphitheatre - Clunia 40°25′28″N 2°40′4″W
- Ercavica Amphitheatre - Ercavica 40°25′48″N 2°40′4″W
- Mesa de Gandul Amphitheatre 37°20′23″N 5°46′42″W
- Amphitheatre of Emerita Augusta
- Santiponce Amphitheatre - Italica 37°26′37″N 6°2′48″W
- Amphitheatre of Legio ( Leon)
- Nertobriga Amphitheatre - Nertobriga 41°30′7″N 1°21′54″W
- Amphitheatre of Segobriga
- Sisapo Amphitheatre - Sisapo 38°38′47″N 4°31′5″W
- Amphitheatre of Tarraco
- Amphitheatre of Toletum
- Valeria de Arriba Amphitheatre - Valeria 39°48′47″N 2°8′50″W

== Theatres ==
- Theatre of Acinipo
- Arcobriga Theatre - Arcobriga 41°17′46″N 2°8′12″W
- Theatre of Baelo Claudia
- Theatre of Badalona 41°27′6″N 2°14′44″E
- Theatre of Bilbilis
- Roman theatre of Zaragoza
- Roman theatre of Cartagena
- Theatre of Clunia Sulpicia
- Roman theatre of Córdoba
- Casas de Reina Theater
- Huesca Theatre - Osca 42°8′19″N 0°24′20″W
- Theatre of Mérida 38°57′58″N 5°57′21″W
- Roman theatre of Cádiz
- Theatre of Itálica
- Roman theatre of Málaga
- Palma de Majorca Theatre
- Roman theatre of Medellín 38°57′59″N 5°57′21″W
- Osuna Theatre - Osuna 37°14′19″N 5°5′43″W
- Ronda la Vieja Theatre - Acinipo
- Sagunto Roman theatre
- Theatre of Segobriga
- Singilia Barba Singilia Theatre
- Tiermes Theatre, Termes 41°19′46″N 3°9′4″W
- Theatre of Tarragona
- Almunecar Theatre - Sexi
- Valeria de Arriba Theatre - Valeria 39°48′50″N 2°8′54″W

== Aqueducts ==
- Almuñécar (5 above ground aqueducts - 4 still in use)
- Acueducto romano de Albarracín-Cella Albarracín-Cella
- Barcino
- Canal de los Franceses 37°11′21″N 3°29′11″W
- Cónchar Acueducto 36°59′8″N 3°36′41″W
- Acueducto Bejís 39°54′35″N 0°42′44″W
- Acueducto romano de Quicena 42°9′2″N 0°22′7″W
- Aqueduct of Albatana
- Roman aqueduct of Sexi, Almuñécar
- Roman aqueduct of Cádiz
- Acueduct Tempul-Cadiz 36°28′2″N 6°7′45″W
- Acueducto Aqua Fontis Aureae (Córdoba) Aqua Fontis Aureae
- Acueducto Aqua Nova Domitiana Augusta (Córdoba) Aqua Nova Domitiana Augusta 37°53′29″N 4°52′43″W
- BODEGA ROMANA DE FUNES en el Valle del Paraiso 38°3′44″N 1°47′6″W
- Consuegra Aqueduct
- Acueducto Itálica 37°30′43″N 6°13′20″W 37°29′57″N 6°11′19″W
- Calicasa Aqueduct 37°16′19″N 3°37′7″W
- Les Ferreres
- Acueducto de Lodosa 42°25′9″N 2°6′37″W
- Los Milagros
- Los Bañales acueducto 42°17′14″N 1°13′16″W
- Lugo
- Acueducto en Obeilar 37°15′3″N 3°52′12″W
- Acueducto ef Plasencia 40°3′1″N 6°5′11″W
- Acueducto of Neria 36°45′20″N 3°50′57″W
- Puente de los Moros 42°25′9″N 2°6′38″W
- Huelva/Onuba Aestuaria
- Merida (Rabo de Buey-San Lázaro)
- Roman Aqueduct Almunecar 36°44′56″N 3°41′19″W 36°44′49″N 3°41′19″W 36°44′41″N 3°41′21″W
- Segovia
- Soneixa Aqueduct 39°49′13″N 0°26′12″W
- Puente - Acueducto romano de Quicena 42°9′2″N 0°22′7″W
- Acueducto de la Peña Cortada 39°44′58″N 0°58′4″W
- Seville/Caños de Carmona
- Termancia (Tiermes)
- Toletum
- Acueducto de Valdepuentes (Córdoba) Valdepuentes

== Triumphal arches ==
- Arc de Berà
- Arch of Cabanes 40°9′56″N 0°0′53″W
- Arch of Medinaceli
- Arch of Trajan (Mérida)

== Arches ==
- Arch of Cáparra
- Arch of Cabanes 40°9′56″N 0°0′52″E
- Arco del Cristo
- Arco de los Blanco

== Bridges ==
- Alcántara Bridge
- Albarregas Roman bridge
- Bridge of Alegria 42°59′29″N 2°30′48″W
- Bridge of Los Cobos
- Casa del Molino de Carrillo 39°10′56″N 3°52′27″W
- Puente Río Arnoia 42°12′1″N 7°58′13″W
- Puente Bibei (OURENSE) 42°20′1″N 3°43′23″W
- Puente de Alcántara, Toledo
- Puente de Alconetar 39°45′13″N 6°26′14″W
- Puente de Atiguieta 42°51′30″N 5°50′53″W
- Puente del Genoves 37°45′1″N 4°35′1″W
- Puente del Castellar (Cuenca) 39°53′5″N 2°15′55″W
- Puente del Diablo 41°28′29″N 1°56′16″W
- Puente sobre el Arzua 42°55′50″N 8°7′49″W
- Ponte Bibei, Mendoya 42°20′1″N 7°12′52″W
- Puente de la Malena 40°22′13″N 5°50′53″W
- Puente de Masegoso
- Puente de Reparacea 43°8′14″N 1°37′15″W
- Puente Masegoso 41°45′50″N 2°8′50″W
- Puente Mocho 38°16′47″N 2°57′49″W
- Puente La Mallona 41°43′3″N 2°43′38″W
- Puente Mocho 41°6′56″N 5°59′55″W
- Ponte Navea 42°20′55″N 7°17′21″W
- Puente sobre rio Jóbalo 40°54′11″N 3°34′21″W
- Puente Valimbre 42°24′50″N 6°0′54″W
- Puente el río Zadorra en Víllodas 42°50′0″N 2°46′58″W
- Puente de Trespuentes 42°50′39″N 2°47′18″W
- Puente Romano Nestar 42°50′21″N 4°14′4″W
- Puente Vella de Vilariño Frío 42°18′58″N 7°32′52″W
- Puente Romano Ablanque 40°53′42″N 2°13′26″W
- Puente Romano Luco de Jiloca 40°58′12″N 1°18′50″W
- Puente Mantible 42°30′8″N 2°30′50″W
- Puente Romano de Calamocha 40°55′13″N 1°18′9″W
- Puente del Andaluz, San Marcial 41°24′13″N 5°47′59″W
- Puente de Andújar 37°52′32″N 4°12′50″W
- Puente de Medellin 38°58′4″N 5°57′47″W
- Puente de Cabezón de Pisuerga 41°44′14″N 4°38′31″W
- Puente sul rio Pisuerga 42°16′41″N 4°14′44″W
- Puente da Cigarrosa, Petín 42°23′18″N 7°7′43″W
- Puente Romano, Burguete - Auritz 42°58′26″N 1°20′24″W
- Puente Romano de Caparra 40°10′14″N 6°6′9″W
- Puente Romano 42°58′8″N 2°30′50″W
- Puente Romano y ermita de la virgen 42°22′14″N 4°59′58″W
- Puente Romano Layos 39°44′49″N 4°5′28″W
- Puento Romano, Niebla (Río Tinto) 37°21′54″N 6°40′28″W
- Puente Romano, San Clemente 39°24′31″N 2°24′56″W
- Puente Romano de Villa del Río 37°59′13″N 4°16′17″W
- Puente Romano Sobre Rio Segre 41°52′45″N 0°52′37″W
- Puente Romano sobre el Grito 39°48′25″N 2°8′43″W
- Puente Romano en el Camino de Toledo 39°42′39″N 3°54′13″W
- Puente sobre el Río Huerva 41°6′31″N 1°14′33″W
- Puente de la Malena 40°22′13″N 5°50′54″W
- Punte del Canto 42°22′7″N 5°2′10″W
- Puente del Roque 41°40′10″N 3°47′38″W
- Puente de Camparañon 41°42′33″N 2°34′15″W
- Puente Reparazea-Oieregi 43°8′14″N 1°37′15″W
- Puente Venta de Magasca 39°25′0″N 5°53′33″W
- Puente de Alcantarilla 37°5′45″N 5°51′41″W
- Puente de la Vizana 42°7′50″N 5°48′23″W
- Puente de la Cumbre 39°25′44″N 5°54′55″W
- Puente romano de la Magdalena 40°22′13″N 5°50′54″W
- Puente Romano Luco de Jiloca 40°58′12″N 1°18′49″W
- Puente Romano en Nestar 42°50′20″N 4°14′4″W
- Puente Romano de Potato 41°25′2″N 5°49′52″W
- Puente Romano Nestar 42°50′20″N 4°14′4″W
- Puente Romano de Mantible 42°30′36″N 2°30′28″W
- Puente Romano de Socuéllamo 39°20′24″N 2°54′6″W
- Puente de Valdesalor 39°22′0″N 6°20′46″W
- Puente Romano, El Pardiel, Cervera del Río Alhama 41°58′59″N 1°57′48″W
- Puente de las Alberguesias 39°26′55″N 6°2′36″W
- Puente Romano Sasamón 42°25′17″N 4°3′17″W
- Puente Romano de Trisla 42°25′18″N 4°3′17″W
- Puente Romano de Allariz 42°11′33″N 7°48′9″W
- Puente romano del Burgo de Osma 41°34′48″N 3°4′54″W
- Puente Romano Cerca de Villa nueva de los infantes 38°41′14″N 2°59′20″W
- Puente de San Pedro 38°34′50″N 5°10′57″W
- Puente de Segura 39°49′2″N 6°58′54″W
- Puente Romano Sobre el Río Cigüela de Villarta de San Juan Puente sobre el rio Bañuelos
- Puente sobre el Rio Bañuelos 39°10′54″N 3°52′28″W
- Puente sobre el Río Arandilla 41°45′52″N 3°23′23″W
- Puente Romano Romangordo/Tajo 39°46′27″N 5°43′20″W
- Ponte románica sobre o Louro 42°3′23″N 8°38′3″W
- Puente Romano de Calamocha 40°55′12″N 1°18′8″W
- Puente Romano . Talamanca de Jarama 40°45′4″N 3°31′12″W
- Puente Romano de Alardos 40°9′4″N 5°21′22″W
- Puente Romano de Carmona 37°28′44″N 5°37′30″W
- Puente Romano de Villarta de San Juan 39°14′36″N 3°25′39″W
- Puente Romano Valdemaqueda 40°29′12″N 4°17′57″W
- Puente Romano Becilla de Valderaduey 42°5′43″N 5°12′51″W
- Tordómar Puente de Tordómar
- Puente Tobera 42°44′53″N 3°18′23″W
- Alconétar Bridge
- Pons Neviae 42°51′36″N 1°20′24″W
- Bridge of Andújar
- Roman bridge of Ávila
- Puente sobre río Duero 41°53′17″N 2°47′51″W
- Puente da Cigarrosa 42°23′16″N 7°6′8″W
- Puente de Miluce sobre el río Arga 42°49′4″N 1°40′48″W
- Pont romain, Ciraqui (Navarra) 42°40′38″N 1°53′41″W
- Puente de San Pedro 42°48′25″N 1°38′37″W
- Puente la Reina 42°33′18″N 0°47′9″W
- Puente y ermita de Villahermosa del Campo 41°6′31″N 1°14′33″W
- Puente Romano y río Pancrudo, Luco de Jiloca 40°58′12″N 1°18′50″W
- Puente Romano de El Viso 38°30′50″N 4°56′50″W
- Bridge of Bermaña
- Bridge of Caesar Augusta (located on the site of bridge Puente de piedra (Zaragoza) and it was a mixed work of stone and wood).
- Puente Miluze 42°49′4″N 1°40′48″W
- Puente de las Herrerías 37°54′3″N 2°56′20″W
- Puente de San Pedro 42°49′25″N 1°38′37″W
- Guadiana Roman bridge
- Puente de Astiguieta 42°51′30″N 2°43′23″W
- Puente Romano sobre el Río Valiñas 43°17′33″N 8°22′1″W
- Puente Romano en Sogo Zamora 41°23′48″N 5°58′40″W
- Puente Romano de Trespuentes 42°50′40″N 2°47′18″W
- Frías (Burgos) Roman Bridge of Frias
- Roman bridge of Córdoba
- Roman bridge del Descalzo
- Puente Romano (Mérida)
- Puente Viejo 38°21′19″N 2°48′11″W
- Roman bridge of Moldera
- Roman bridge of Lugo
- Roman bridge of Ourense
- Roman bridge of Talamanca de Jarama
- Roman bridge of Salamanca
- Bridge of Segura
- Puente Romano de Trespuentes 42°50′40″N 2°47′18″W
- Bridge of Valimbre 42°24′50″N 6°0′53″W
- Pont del Diable
- Puentecillas (Palencia)

== Circus ==
- Calahorra Circus - Calagurris 42°18′17″N 1°57′46″W
- Consuegra
- Cordoba Circus
- Ecija Circus - Astigi
- Circus Maximus of Emerita Augusta
- Circus of Tarraco 41°6′58″N 1°15′24″E
- Circus of Toletum 39°51′50″N 4°1′45″W
- Sagunto Circus - Saguntum
- Santiponce Circus - Italica 37°26′21″N 6°2′13″W
- Segobriga Circus 39°53′20″N 2°48′49″W
- Valencia Circus - Valentia

== Dams ==
- Alcantarilla Dam
- Almonacid de la Cuba Dam
- Consuegra Dam
- Cornalvo Dam
- Ermita de la Virgen del Pilar Dam
- Esparragalejo Dam
- Iturranduz Dam
- Jumilla Dam 38°19′6″N 1°16′40″W
- La Pared de los Moros
- Muel Dam
- Murro Dam 39°0′58″N 7°0′57″W
- Proserpina Dam
- Puy Foradado Dam
- Rambla de Julbena Dam 36°47′43″N 2°58′0″W
- Villafranca del Campo Dam 40°41′10″N 1°21′20″W

== Forums ==
- Augusteum and Forum of Cartagena
- Forum of Astorga
- Forum of Zaragoza
- Forum of Cáparra
- Forum of Saguntum
- Forum of Clunia Sulpicia
- Colonial forum of Tarragona
- Provincial forum of Tarragona
- Forum adiectum of Córdoba
- Colonial forum of Córdoba
- Provincial forum of Mérida (only remain the main gate)
- Municipal forum of Mérida

== Mausoleums ==
- Mausoleum of Abla 37°8′40″N 2°46′26″W
- Yacimiento El Vizcaíno y mausoleo de Layos 39°46′31″N 4°3′28″W
- Mausoleo romano de la Sinagoga en Sádaba (Zaragoza) Mausoleo_de_los_Atilios
- Mausoleum of Centcelles
- Mausoleum of Chiprana
- Mausoleo de los Atilios 42°17′42″N 1°15′56″W
- Mausoleo romano de "La Torrecilla"
- Roman mausoleum of Córdoba
- Mausoleum of Fabara
- Mausoleum of Las Vegas
- Mausoleum of Miralpeix
- Mausoleum of Punta del Moral

== Palaces ==
- Palace of Maximian

== Public baths and thermals ==
- Caviclum (Termas) 36°43′31″N 3°57′28″W
- Roman baths and snow pit of the Street Reyes Huertas (Mérida)
- Baths of Acinipo
- Baths of Alange
- Roman Baths of Aquae Calidae 41°38′4″N 2°9′41″W
- Roman Baths of Arcala 42°50′28″N 2°37′56″W
- Baths of Astorga
- Roman baths of Badalona
- Roman baths of Baños de Montemayor
- Roman baths of Zaragoza
- Baths of Cáparra
- Baths of Cartagena
- Campo Valdés Roman baths
- Baths of Clunia Sulpicia
- Roman baths of Alcalá de Henares
- Baths of Lecrín
- Roman baths of León
- Roman baths of Lugo
- Roman baths of Nimfeo (Fortuna) 38°12′34″N 1°6′49″W
- Roman Baths of San Lázaro
- Roman baths of Toledo
- Major baths of Itálica
- Molacillos-Termas Romana 41°36′33″N 5°39′57″W
- Minor baths of Itálica
- El Conventón, Rebolledo, Valdeola 42°53′15″N 4°9′31″W
- Segobriga termes
- Thermal complex of Herrera
- Thermal baths of Termantia
- Termas romanas de El Castrejón 37°32′58″N 6°7′0″W

== Temples ==
- Pórtico de Curia Pórtico de Curia
- Temple of Augustus (Barcino)
- Los Mármoles Temple 39°48′25″N 5°28′56″W
- Yacimiento arqueológico de La Escuera 38°7′22″N 0°40′19″W
- Santa Eulalia de Bóveda Lucus Augusti
- Temple of Alcántara
- Temple of Corduba
- Temple of Diana (Emerita Augusta)
- Temple of Diana (Augustobirga) 39°48′24″N 5°28′56″W
- Santuario de Munigua 37°42′48″N 5°44′28″W
- Temple of Melqart (Gades)
- Miralpeix, Caspe 41°14′9″N 0°2′16″W
- Temple of Trajan (Italica)
- Temple of Vic
- Torre del Breny 41°40′41″N 1°51′17″E
- Vilablareix Temple 41°57′23″N 2°46′23″E

== Towers ==
- Tower of Hercules
- Torre dels Escipions
- Torre Ciega
- Tower of Hercules, Villajoyosa
- Torre Soto de Roma 37°12′26″N 3°47′34″W
- Cuarto Roble 39°26′21″N 6°23′50″W
- El Junquillo

== Walls ==
- Walls of Astorga
- Walls of Asturica Augusta
- Roman walls of Zaragoza
- Roman walls of Barcelona
- Walls of Empúries
- Walls of Seville
- Walls of León
- Roman Walls of Lugo
- Walls of Tarragona
- Roman walls of Cimadevilla
- Walls of Entretorres
- Roman and Moorish City walls of Arcos de la Frontera

== Quarry and mines ==
- Channel of La Cabrera
- Cantera Romana en L'Énova 39°2′2″N 0°27′36″W
- Las Médulas
- Quarry of Carthago Nova
- Quarry of El Mèdol

== Christian buildings ==
- Early Christian Cemetery of Tarragona
- Church of Santa Engracia de Zaragoza
- Mina La Jayona 38°7′12″N 5°55′38″W
- Palaeochristian basilica at Empúries
- Sant Romà de Sidillà 42°4′14″N 2°59′32″E

== Other architecture ==
- Roman water duct Almonacid de la Cuba 41°16′43″N 0°47′29″W
- Roman Watermill 37°0′4″N 4°33′15″W
- Barracks of Legio
- La Cueva, Camesa y Rebolledo, Valdeolea Building 42°53′31″N 4°9′57″W
- Ciavieja
- Cisterna de Andelos 42°35′58″N 1°52′2″W
- Monument of Urkulu 43°2′44″N 1°14′27″W
- Decumanus maximus of Carthago Nova
- Baños de la Reina Fish farm
- Casa Romana (Bætulo)
- Decumanuses and cardo of Complutum
- Domeses Asturica Augusta
- Domuses of Clunia Sulpicia
- Fontes Tamarici, fountain in Velilla del Río Carrión
- House of the amphitheater (Emerita Augusta)
- House of the Mithraeum (Emerita Augusta)
- House of Mosaics (Lucus Augusti)
- House of the Faucets and macellum (Complutum)
- House of Hippolytus (Complutum)
- House of la Exedra (Italica)
- House of Neptune (Italica)
- House of the Patio Rodio (Italica)
- House of Hilas (Italica)
- House of the Birds (Italica)
- House of the Planetary (Italica)
- Los Columbarios
- Imperial cult enclosure (Tarraco)
- Roman hydraulic infrastructure in Toledo
- Macellum of Clunia Sulpicia
- Mansio, inn and domuses of Miacum
- Miliariums in the Vía de la Plata
- Miliariums in the Via Nova
- Militarum Columna di Lorca
- Miliarium of Cercedilla
- Roman necropolises of León
- Necropolis of Barcino
- Necropolis of Pintia 41°37′5″N 4°10′11″W
- Necropolis of San Roque
- Roman salting factory of Cimadevilla
- S’Argamassa Roman Fish Farm
- Sewer of Asturica Augusta
- Sewer of Clunia Sulpicia
- Molacillos-Termas Romanas 41°36′33″N 5°39′56″W
- Ovens of the Fornaca
- Porta Principalis Sinistra (Legio)
- Puerta de San Vicente and Puerta de Gonzalo Dávila (Ávila)
- Pretorio and Principia of Legio

== Villas ==
- Roman villa Adro Vello 42°28′39″N 8°55′51″E
- Roman villaL'Alcora 40°4′5″N 0°10′50″W
- Roman villa Sant Amanç 41°44′5″N 1°40′53″E
- Roman villa dels Munts 41°8′9″N 1°22′59″E
- Villa del Paturro
- Villa del Val
- Roman Villa Espelt 41°35′55″N 1°35′59″E
- Roman Villa Fortunatus 41°33′23″N 0°19′16″E
- Villa of Aeso
- Villa of Almenara-Puras
- Villa of Bruñel
- Villa of Cambre
- Villa of Camesa-Rebolledo
- Villa of Camino de Albalate
- Villa of Can Llauder
- Cambrils 41°3′57″N 1°3′1″E
- Villa of Can Terrers 41°40′13″N 2°17′17″E
- Roman villa Can Sent 41°28′55″N 2°15′28″E
- Roman villa Carrova, Amposta 40°44′31″N 0°33′42″E
- Roman villa Casa Ferrer 38°22′17″N 0°25′39″W
- Roman villa Cerro del Campo, Monroy 39°38′52″N 6°15′9″W
- Villa of El Ruedo
- Roman villa Fuente Álamo 37°28′23″N 4°2′3″W
- Villa of Gabia la Grande
- Villa of la Estación
- Villa of La Olmeda
- Villa of Las Calaveras
- Roman villa La Torrecilla, Perales del Río, Getafe 40°18′29″N 3°37′8″W
- Villa of La Quintilla
- Villa of Las Gabias
- Villa of Las Torres 36°25′7″N 5°3′54″W
- Villa of Los Villares
- Roman villa of Los Quintanares Sant Amanç
- Villa of Noheda
- Villa of Nova Augusta
- Roman villa Pla de Nadal 39°29′52″N 0°32′9″W
- Roman villa of Puente Genil 37°25′1″N 4°43′29″W
- Roman villa of Paturro 37°35′18″N 0°50′21″W
- Villa of Río Grande
- Villa of Río Verde
- Villa of Rincón de la Victoria
- Roman villa San Pedro del Arroyo 40°48′19″N 4°52′3″W
- Villa of Saelices el Chico 40°40′15″N 6°37′57″W
- Roman villa San Julian de Valmuza 40°54′32″N 5°46′42″W
- Villa of Tejada
- Roman villa Torreblanca del Sol, Fuengirola 36°33′52″N 4°36′9″W
- Villa of Torreáguila
- Villa of Vivarium
- Roman villa Villamargo 39°57′52″N 0°1′28″W
- El Camp de les Lloses
- Ègara
- Empúries
- Deóbriga
- Dertosa
- Archeological Park of Carranque
- Iberian-Roman town of El Monastil
- Iluro
- La Torre (Sax)
- Vareia
- Late-Roman villa of Camarzana de Tera

=== See also ===
Roman Villas in Spain and Portugal ( KMZ File)

== Camps and forts ==
- Atxa, Vitoria 42°52′7″N 2°42′15″W
- Aquis Querquennis 41°58′26″N 7°58′50″W
- Castra Cecilia 39°30′1″N 6°20′55″W
- Castra Legionis (Legio)
- Castra Servilia
- Ciadella - Campamento Romano As Cruces (Bajo Cubierta) 43°5′3″N 8°2′32″W
- Los Casarejos, San Martín de Losa Ciadella - Campamento Romano As Cruces (Bajo Cubierta)
- Los Castillejos, Hermandad de Campoo de Suso Camp 42°57′23″N 4°13′5″W
- El Cantón, Molledo y Arenas de Iguña Camp 43°9′58″N 3°59′55″W
- Petavonium
- Robadorio, Vega de Liébana - Boca de Huérgano Camp 43°2′59″N 4°44′15″W
- Puig-Rom, Roses Fort

== Roads and road stations ==
- Ab Asturica Burdigalam
- Municipia Elda ( Station) 38°29′39″N 0°47′16″W
- Road of la Fuenfría
- Road of Toletum
- Road of Vesaya Valley
- Via Augusta
- Vía de la Plata
- Via Nova

=== See also ===
Vias Romanas en Castilla y Leon Roman Roads in Castilla and Leon

== Ports ==
- River port of Caesar Augusta

=== See also ===
Ancient Ports – Ports Antiques Spain and Portugal

== Cities ==
- Acinipo (Ronda)
- Andelos 42°35′59″N 1°51′33″W
- Antequera
- Arcobriga 41°17′45″N 2°8′17″W
- Astroga
- Ategua 37°45′19″N 4°34′22″W
- Aratispi 36°56′18″N 4°26′28″W
- Augustobriga 39°48′27″N 5°28′56″W
- Arva 37°37′22″N 5°36′23″W
- Bætulo (Badalona)
- Baelo Claudia
- Barcino (Barcelona)
- Bilbilis (Augusta Bilbilis)
- Cáparra
- Carteia/Calpe/Karpessos 36°10′59″N 5°24′37″W
- Cara/Carta 42°22′26″N 1°32′57″W
- Carthago Nova (Cartagena)
- Caesar Augusta (Zaragoza)
- Caesarobriga (Talavera de la Reina)
- Cerro Cepero, Baza 37°30′43″N 2°43′57″W
- Caminreal La Caridad, Caminreal
- Castillo de Loarre Calagurris (Fibularia)
- Castulo/Caesarii Iuvenales
- Celsa 41°22′21″N 0°26′2″W
- Ciudad portuaria fenicia La Fonteta 38°6′5″N 0°39′1″W
- Clunia Sulpicia 41°22′24″N 0°25′56″W
- Colonia Victrix Iulia Lépida Celsa
- Contrebia Belaisca Contrebia Belaisca/Contrebia 41°30′47″N 1°1′37″W
- Contributa Iulia Ugultunia 38°20′56″N 6°23′27″W
- Complutum (Alcalá de Henares)
- Corduba (Córdoba)
- Emerita Augusta (Mérida)
- Emporion (Empúries)
- Ercávica 40°26′0″N 2°40′11″W
- Gades (Cádiz)
- Ilici/Helike/Ecclesia Elotana 38°14′21″N 0°41′43″W
- Ilarteda 38°28′34″N 1°36′21″W
- Ilugo
- Iptuci/Ituci 37°45′17″N 4°22′39″W
- Italica (Santiponce)
- Labitulosa/Labitolosa 42°8′46″N 0°17′54″E
- Laminium
- Lancia/Lance 42°31′49″N 5°25′53″W
- Legio (León)
- Iessos/Iesos 41°47′15″N 1°17′23″E
- Libisosa/Colonia Forum Augustum 38°56′29″N 2°21′18″W
- Lucentum (Alicante)
- Lucus Augusti (Lugo)
- Juliobriga
- Malaca (Málaga)
- Mellaria 38°17′40″N 5°20′23″W
- Metellinum (Medelin) 38°57′52″N 5°57′27″W
- Miacum
- Munigua 37°42′47″N 5°44′27″W
- Norba Caesarina (Cáceres)
- Nertobriga (Tarraconense) 41°30′7″N 1°21′52″W
- Numantia
- Ocuri 36°41′13″N 5°26′49″W
- Onuba Aestuaria (Huelva)
- Torre de los Herberos, Dos Hermanas 37°16′25″N 6°0′16″W
- Recópolis 40°19′16″N 2°53′38″W
- Rhoda/Roda 42°16′2″N 3°10′9″W
- Regina
- Sagunto
- Salaria 37°55′30″N 3°19′26″W
- Sanisera (Menorca)
- Segóbriga 39°53′7″N 2°48′46″W
- Sexi/Saxetanum
- Sisapo 38°38′47″N 4°31′5″W
- Tarraco (Tarragona)
- Tiermes
- Toletum (Toledo)
- Tugia 37°53′32″N 3°10′2″W
- Urso
- Uxama 41°34′37″N 3°5′20″W
- Valeria 39°48′32″N 2°9′0″W
- Vareia 42°27′39″N 2°24′23″W
- Valentia Edetanorum
