= Bielsa (surname) =

Bielsa is a surname. Notable people include:

- Antonio Bielsa Alegre – Spanish archaeologist
- Marcelo Bielsa – Argentine football coach
- María Eugenia Bielsa – Argentine politician (Minister of Territorial Development and Habitat since 2019)
- Rafael Bielsa – Argentine politician (Minister of Foreign Affairs 2005–2007)
- Rosa Bielsa, Spanish tennis player
