= Oliva de Plasencia =

- municipality
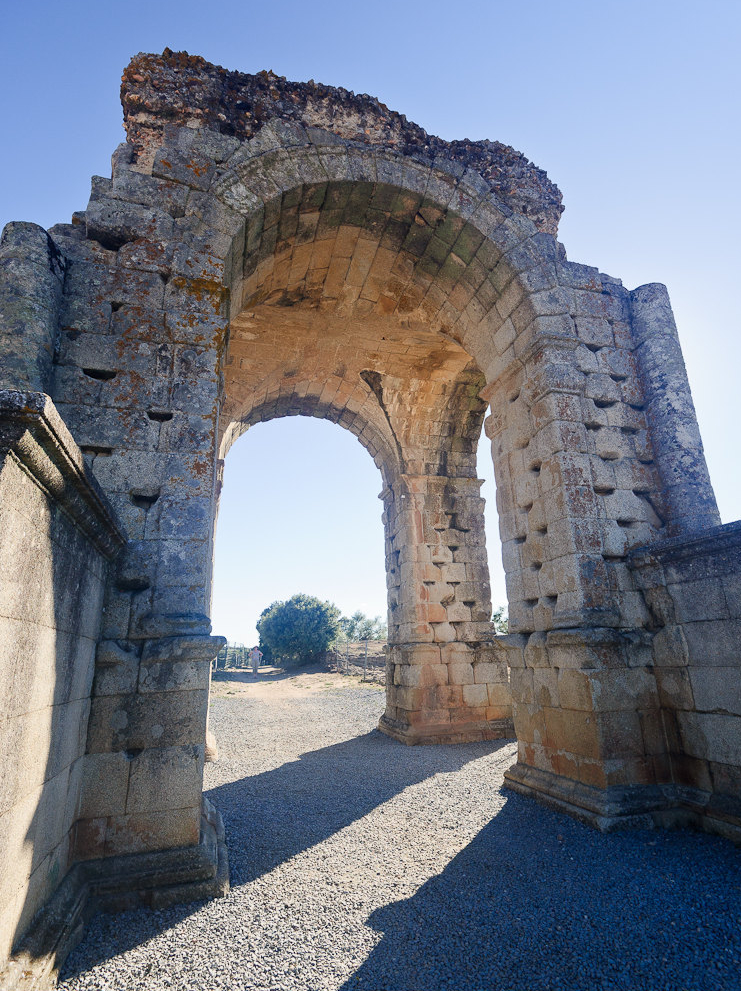
- Roman Arch of Cáparra, in Oliva de Plasencia

- Flag Coat of arms

- Location of Oliva de Plasencia in Extremadura Location of Oliva de Plasencia in Spain.
- Coordinates: 40°6′44″N 6°5′13″W
- Country: Spain
- Autonomous community: Extremadura
- Province: Cáceres
- Comarca: Tierra de Granadilla

Area
  - Total: 89 km^{2} (34 sq mi)
- Elevation: 416 m (1,365 ft)

Population (2025-01-01)
  - Total: 290
  - Density: 3.3/km^{2} (8.4/sq mi)
- Time zone: UTC+1 (CET)
  - Summer (DST): UTC+2 (CEST)

Oliva de Plasencia is a municipality located in the province of Cáceres, Extremadura, Spain. According to the 2005 census (INE), the municipality has a population of 252 inhabitants.

== See also ==
- List of municipalities in Cáceres
