= Roman circus of Toledo =

Coordinates: 39.8643°N 4.0292°W

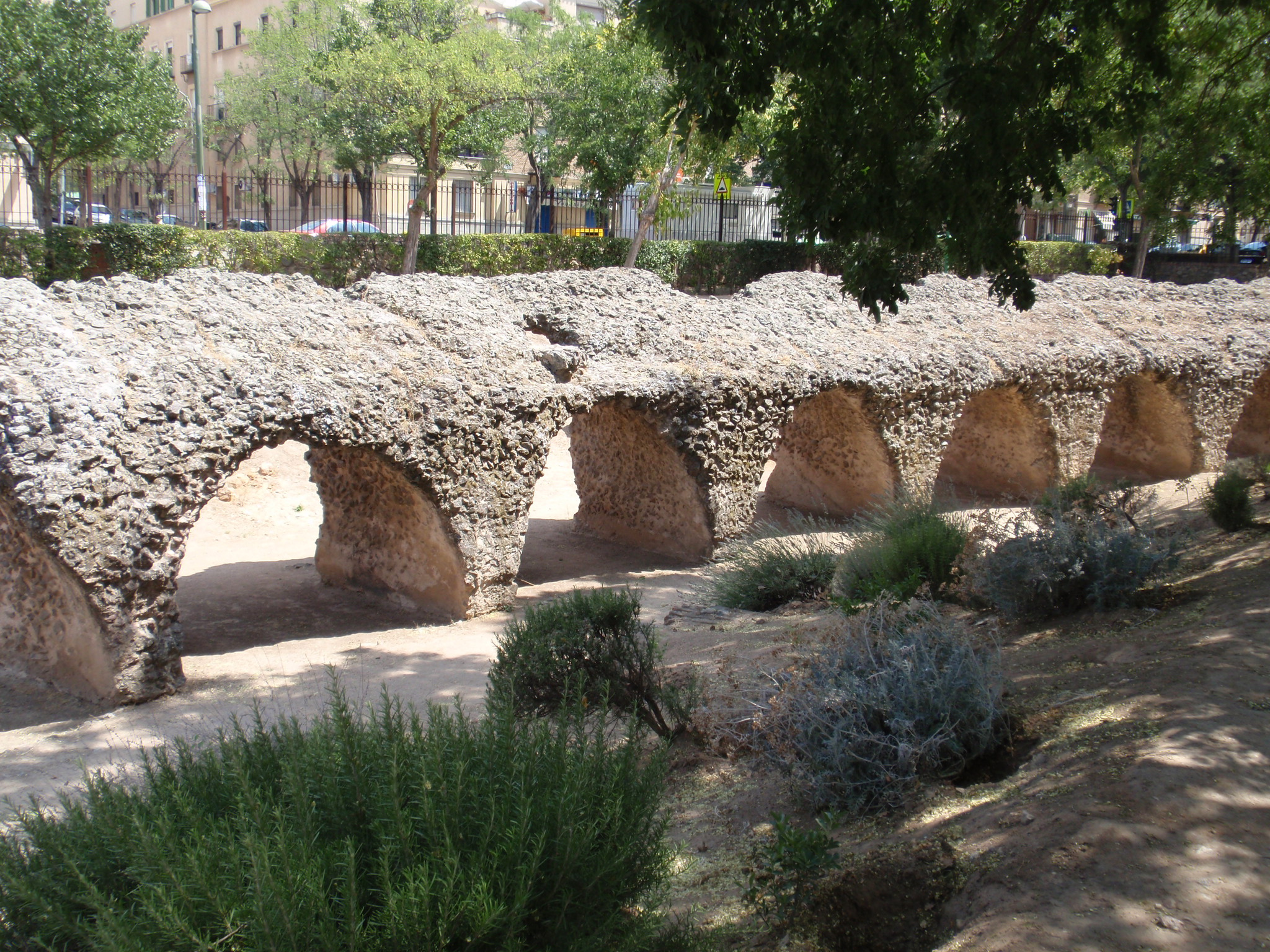
Roman circus of Toledo

The Roman circus of Toledo is an Ancient Roman circus site of Hispania. It served the city of Toletum, the present-day Toledo, Castilla-La Mancha, Spain.

== History ==
The Roman circus at Toletum (Toledo) was built in the 1st century, during the reign of emperor Augustus or emperor Tiberius. Possibly, its construction was included within the plan that the emperor undertook throughout the Roman Empire to endow all the great cities with public buildings like amphitheatres, theatres, fora, and thermae, with the aim of promoting the Romanization in these zones. In particular, the Roman circus was located in the north of the Roman city.

Given the size of the circus, as it happened in almost all Hispanic-Roman cities, it was located on the outskirts of the walled enclosure. It is certain that from the city there was a causeway to the circus, which has not been found.

Next to the circus was located another structure dedicated to leisure, the Roman theatre, just where currently the sports facilities of the college located next to the circus. The vestiges that came to the 20th century are recorded, although the use of the land for other purposes has prevented the evaluation of the remains. Checking the difference between the level of the ground between the excavated remains of the circus and the surrounding plot, it is possible that elements of the theatre are preserved below ground level, such as the stage, part of the scaenae frons and the first stands. In addition, the location of sports facilities on that site (whose need to take advantage of part of the subsoil is zero), will have allowed its conservation in an acceptable state.

A Roman amphitheatre, in the neighborhood of Covachuelas, was more distant than the circus, on the central section of Calle Honda. Not much is known of this building, since at the beginning of the 20th century the remains were dynamited to free the site for other uses.

=== Archaeology ===
Although little investigated, since more than half of the infrastructure still remains unexcavated, its similarities with other circuses of the Peninsula, like the one at Emerita Augusta, allow to affirm that its capacity had to be between the 15,000 or 30,000 spectators, which initially proved sufficient to meet the needs of the city as well as other surrounding towns. The Roman circus had dimensions of 422 meters long by about 112 meters wide.

With the information now available, it is not known that the Roman circus of Toletum was used for naumachia (recreation of naval battles) as it happened, for example, in the Roman circus of Tarraco.

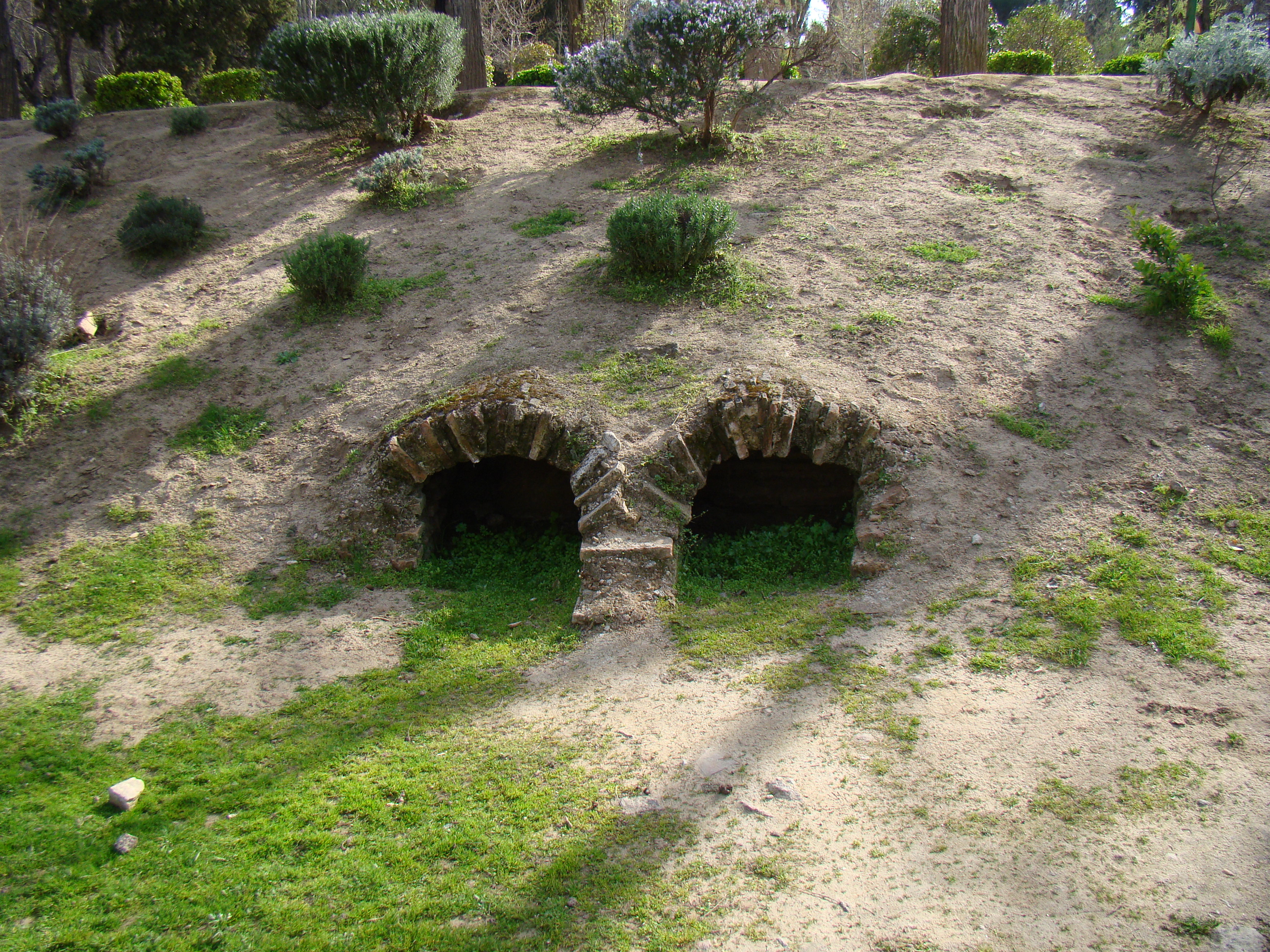
Detail of the ruins

The archaeological remains of the circus are important since it allows to affirm that, given its dimensions, its capacity and comparing it with those of other Hispanic-Roman cities of the Peninsula, Toledo must have been in Roman times a city that played an important role in the political and legal administration of the Peninsula.

The decline of the building arrived with the arrival at the Christianity that rejected this type of public events. Finally, it was with the arrival of the Visigothic domination when it ended up being abandoned. From this moment, the exspoliation of the sillars of granite that covered the opus caementicium to re-use it in other constructions. This exspoliation will extend during practically all the High Middle Ages.

During the Muslim stage, at least initially, the stands of the circus were used by merchants to locate their establishments there. Later, the Arabs used the circus as a cemetery, of which can be observed to the naked eye many vestiges. Currently, the medieval cemetery remains there, which makes the archaeological park an important medieval cemetery.

During the Late Middle Ages, it is possible that the plunder would end, although the buildings were abandoned on the outskirts of the medieval city, which made it easier for the inhabitants to bury them and the Toledans forget the location of these.

Currently there are no plans for excavation and valorization for the remains of the theatre or the amphitheatre, since it is not clear that there are remains of importance, although there is a project of enhancement of the Roman circus with the aim of completely unravelling it and make an archaeological park worthy of the Roman Toletum.

== See also ==
- Hippodrome – a Greek arena also used for chariot racing
