= Albalat dels Ànecs =

Albalat dels Ànecs (Valencian pronunciation: [albaˈlad delz ˈaneks]) is an ancient settlement, now abandoned, in the municipality of Cabanes, province of Castellón, Spain.

The interest of Albalat dels Ànecs remains in its fortified church, a unique example of the defensive architecture of the Spanish Mediterranean coast of the sixteenth century. The church was built in the thirteenth century, and was later fortified because of the frequent attacks. It stands at the bottom of the Albalat castle, of which only a few remains can be seen. Nearby three other towers of the fifteenth century can be found, all of them with the same defensive function.
