= Cabanes, Castellón =

Cabanes
- Municipality
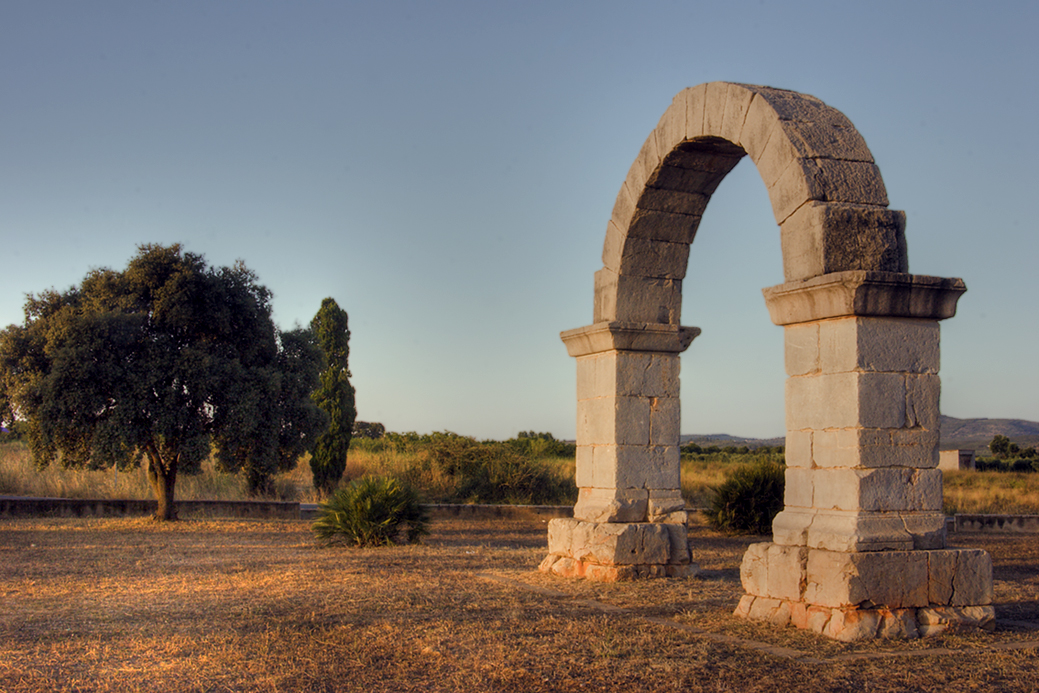
- Arch of Cabanes

- Coat of arms

- Location in Spain
- Coordinates: 40°09′21″N 0°02′43″E
- Country: Spain
- Autonomous community: Valencian Community
- Province: Castelló
- Comarca: Plana Alta

Government
  - Mayor: Francisco Vicente Artola Escuriola (PP)

Area
  - Total: 131.60 km^{2} (50.81 sq mi)
- Elevation: 290 m (950 ft)

Population (2025-01-01)
  - Total: 3,475
  - Density: 26.41/km^{2} (68.39/sq mi)
- Demonym: Cabanyut
- Time zone: UTC+1 (CET)
  - Summer (DST): UTC+2 (CEST)
- Postal code: 12560
- Official language(s): Valencian
- Website: Official website

Cabanes (Valencian pronunciation: [kaˈbanes]), also known as Cabanes de l'Arc, is a village and municipality located in the comarca of Plana Alta, in the province of Castellón, Valencian Community, Spain.

Cabanes is located near the old Roman road Via Augusta, along which the Arch of Cabanes, a triumphal arch from the 2nd century AD, can be seen.

In the municipality stands the old settlement of Albalat dels Ànecs, where several fortified buildings still remain.

== See also ==
- List of municipalities in Castellón
