= Roman arch of Medinaceli =

- Arco Romano de Medinaceli (Spanish)
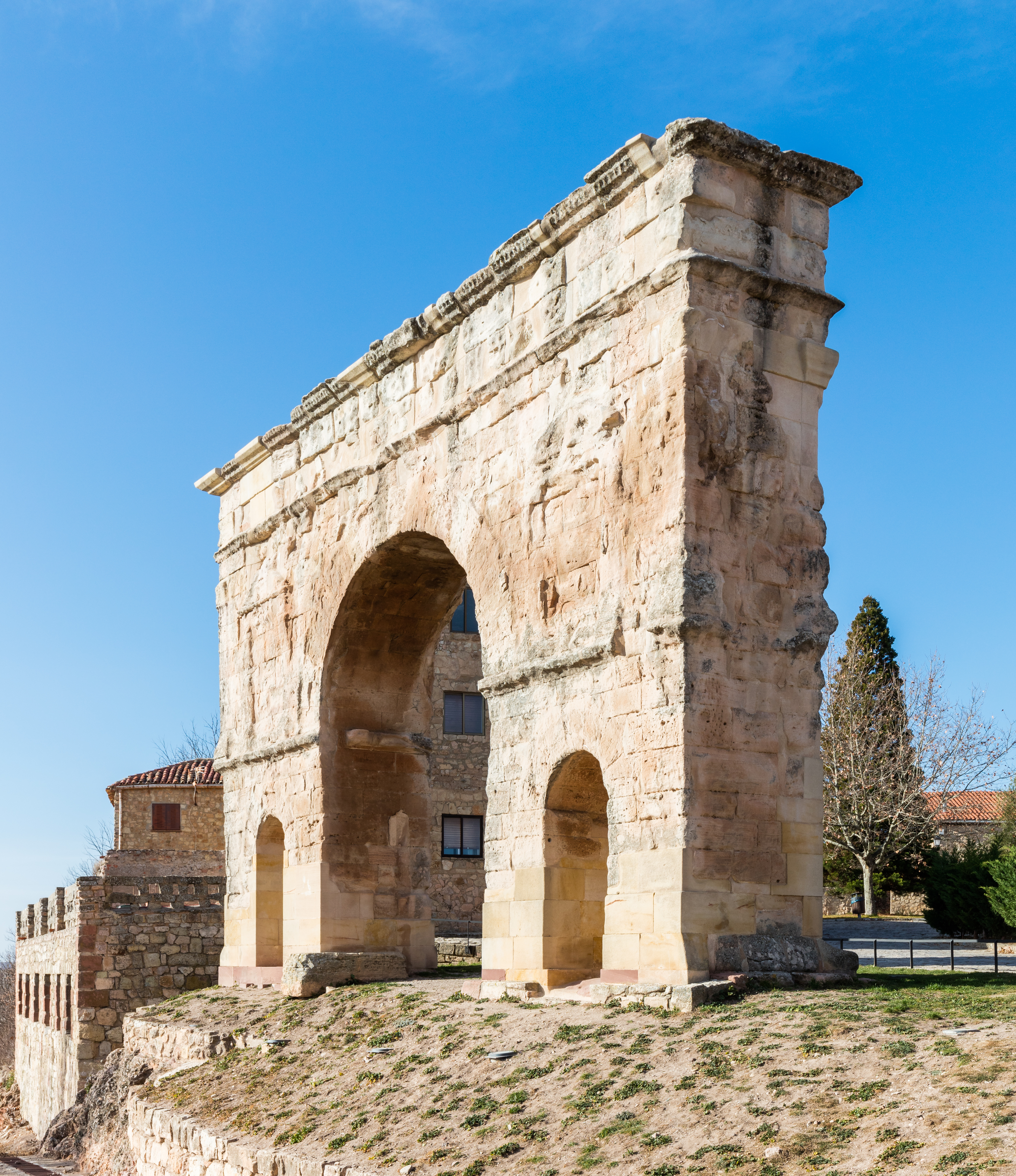

- Location within Spain
- 41.17083°N 2.4325°W
- Location: Medinaceli, Spain

Spanish Cultural Heritage
- Official name: Arco Romano de Medinaceli
- Type: Non-movable
- Criteria: Monument
- Designated: 1930
- Reference no.: RI-51-0000350

The Roman arch of Medinaceli (Spanish: Arco Romano de Medinaceli) is an ancient Roman triumphal arch located in Medinaceli, in Castile and León, Spain. It is constructed in stone using a technique called opus quadratum. It was declared Bien de Interés Cultural in 1930.

== Characteristics ==
Its preservation is decent, except for its decoration, which is plain and has significantly worn due to its geographical location. It was built on a hill overlooking the Jalón valley, situated nearly 1200 meters high in a cold area prone to rain, winds, and snowfall, which caused the wear of the ashlar masonry, moldings, and cornices. The northern and western sides, which face the town and mountain, are better preserved, while the southern and eastern sides, facing the valley, are notably worn. The base is in a worse state, with some replaced ashlars.

The arch's orientation has always been from east to west and longitudinally from north to south. The arch's front, to the east, faces the valley and the Medinaceli Station, while the back of the arch, to the west, looks towards the town of Medinaceli.

Its construction is of Opus Quadratum with varying sizes, laid in stretcher bond, and some in header bond. All decorative elements were carved on them. The overall size of the structure is 13.20 meters in length, 2.10 meters in width, and 8.10 meters in height. It was erected at the end of the 1st century. Besides its commemorative function, it served as an entrance gate to the city. The central archway was used for carriages and animals, and the side passages were for pedestrians.

== Decoration ==
Its base consists of four large pillars connected by arches, forming two equal arches with a span of 1.30 meters, composed of seven identical voussoirs. They are crowned with a finishing molding from which the central arch arises, turning them into support elements for it.

The central arch, crowned with a molding similar to the lower elements, has a span of 1.90 meters and is made up of 23 voussoirs and two decorative side sets. These sets consist of fluted pilasters with a Corinthian capital, a tympanum, and two bases resting on the lower molding. In the four corners of the intermediate section, there are four other pilasters on two facades, larger than the previous ones but with the same design. This unique design, where pilasters appear in the middle section but not at the base, is because the wall in which this arch opened had a height similar to the first level, so the protruding height began at the same point as these pilasters.

The top section consists of two rows of ashlar blocks crowned by a cornice. Golden letters were anchored to these blocks to form the commemorative inscription, leaving some fastening bolts. This inscription has been reconstructed and reads:

- North Side: NVMINI AVGVSTO SACRV[M].

Dedicated to the divine spirit of the Emperor Augustus.

- South Side: NVMINI IMP (eratoris) DOMITIANI AVG (usti) GER (manici).

To the divine spirit of Emperor Domitian Augustus Germanicus. It was modified in 98 AD to NVMINI IMP (eratoris) TRAIANI AVG (usti) GER (manici). To the divine spirit of Emperor Trajan Augustus Germanicus.

== See also ==
- List of Roman sites in Spain
