= Roman mausoleum of Córdoba =

1st Century mausoleum in southern Spain

Coordinates: 37.8851°N 4.7850°W

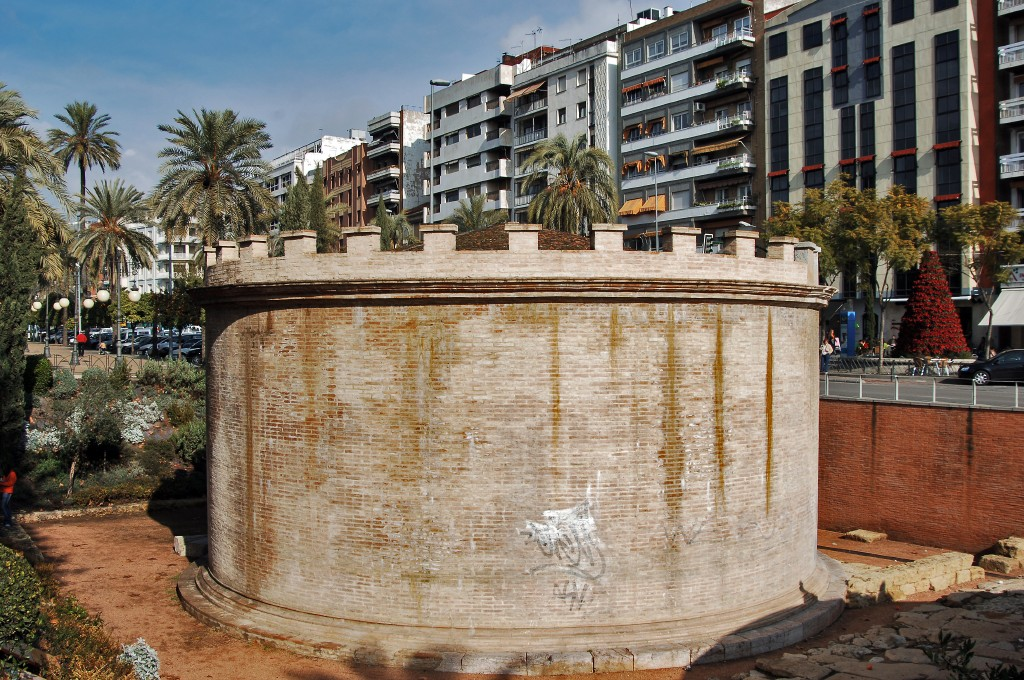
Roman mausoleum of Córdoba.

The Roman mausoleum of Córdoba is an ancient structure in the Jardines de la Victoria, Córdoba, Andalusia, southern Spain. It is a funerary monument of cylinder-shaped that corresponded to a group of funerary monuments of the Republican era, built in the 1st century AD. It was discovered in 1993 during archaeological excavations.

It includes the chamber tomb that housed the Urn, as well as remains of the basement, cornices, and crenellated parapet. Unusual for such structures in Roman Iberia, it may have been designed by an Italian architect, due to similarities to other mausoleums in Rome and the rest of Italy. Its size also suggests that it belonged to a wealthy family.

The mausoleum is located near the road that connected the ancient city with Hispalis (now Seville), and exited from the city by the western gate, or "Porta Principalis Sinistra" (Puerta de Gallegos). The archaeological site also includes remains of the pavement of the latter.

== History ==
The mausoleums were built on a pre-existing necropolis that had already undergone a phase of monumentalization during the Augustus era. During the reign of Emperor Tiberius (14-37 AD), the Northern Mausoleum was constructed, serving as the final resting place for an unknown patrician. The Southern Mausoleum was intended for the ancestors and relatives of this patrician, taking the form of a columbarium. By the middle of the 1st century, the necropolis reduced its perimeter to make way for a residential district in the shadow of the Corduba amphitheater. By the end of the 3rd century, after the abandonment of this residential area, the original funerary function of the place was restored.

The remains were discovered in 1993 during archaeological excavations, after which they were reconstructed following original patterns. In 2021, the University of Córdoba proposed opening the monument to the public on Saturdays and Sundays in agreement with the Córdoba City Council. However, this agreement was rejected a year later. In February 2023, the City Council announced that it would oversee the opening of this public space.

== Description ==
These are two cylindrical funerary monuments, each 13 meters in diameter. They preserve the burial chamber that housed the cinerary urn, as well as remnants of the base, cornices, and battlemented parapet.

Unusual in its typology for the peninsula, it might have been designed by an Italic architect, drawing inspiration from other mausoleums in the imperial capital and throughout Italy. Given its size, it likely belonged to a wealthy family.

This is a clear example of the Roman law that mandated the construction of burials outside the city limits, flanking the communication routes. These monuments are located next to what was the Via Augusta, which connected Corduba with Hispalis, and exited the city through the western gate or Porta Principalis Sinistra (the old Gallegos gate). Original remnants of the pavement from that era can be observed in the archaeological site.
