= Arch of Cabanes =

Roman arch of Cabanes
- Arco Romano de Cabanes
- Castellón; Near Cabanes in Spain
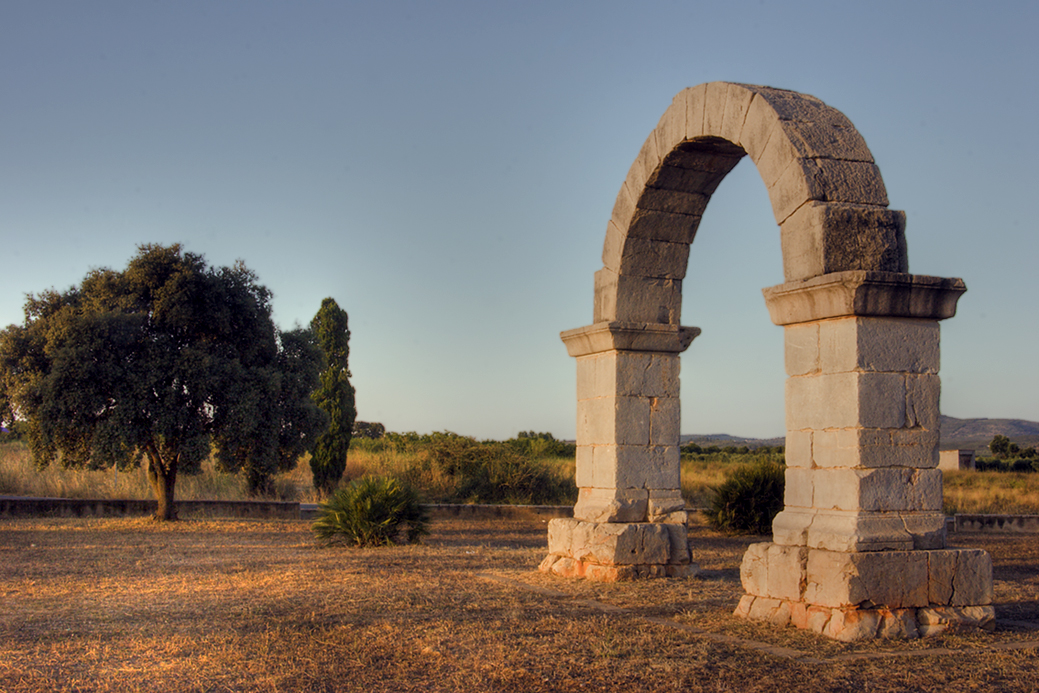

Site information
- Type: Ancient Roman triumphal arch
- Open to the public: Yes
- Website: www.cabanes.es/es/content/arco-romano

Site history
- Built: II century

The Arch of Cabanes is a Roman triumphal arch built in the 2nd century AD. It is located approximately 2 km (1.2 mi) from Cabanes (Castellón, Valencia), on the via Augusta, situated in the middle of the plain to which it lends its name.

== History ==
The construction of the arch is attributed to the 2nd century on the basis of the discovery of ceramic material and coinage from this period at the base of the monument.

It was probably erected as part of a private funerary monument, perhaps in connection with a rural villa in the area.

It is mentioned in documents from 1243 (Carta Puebla) and in 1873 the provincial commission of monuments redirected the street which passed under the arch, in order to safeguard the monument. The arch was declared a historic-artistic monument among the national artistic treasures of Spain in 1931. In 2004, the commune of Cabanes approved the "Special Plan for the Protection of the Roman Road and Arch at Cabanes"

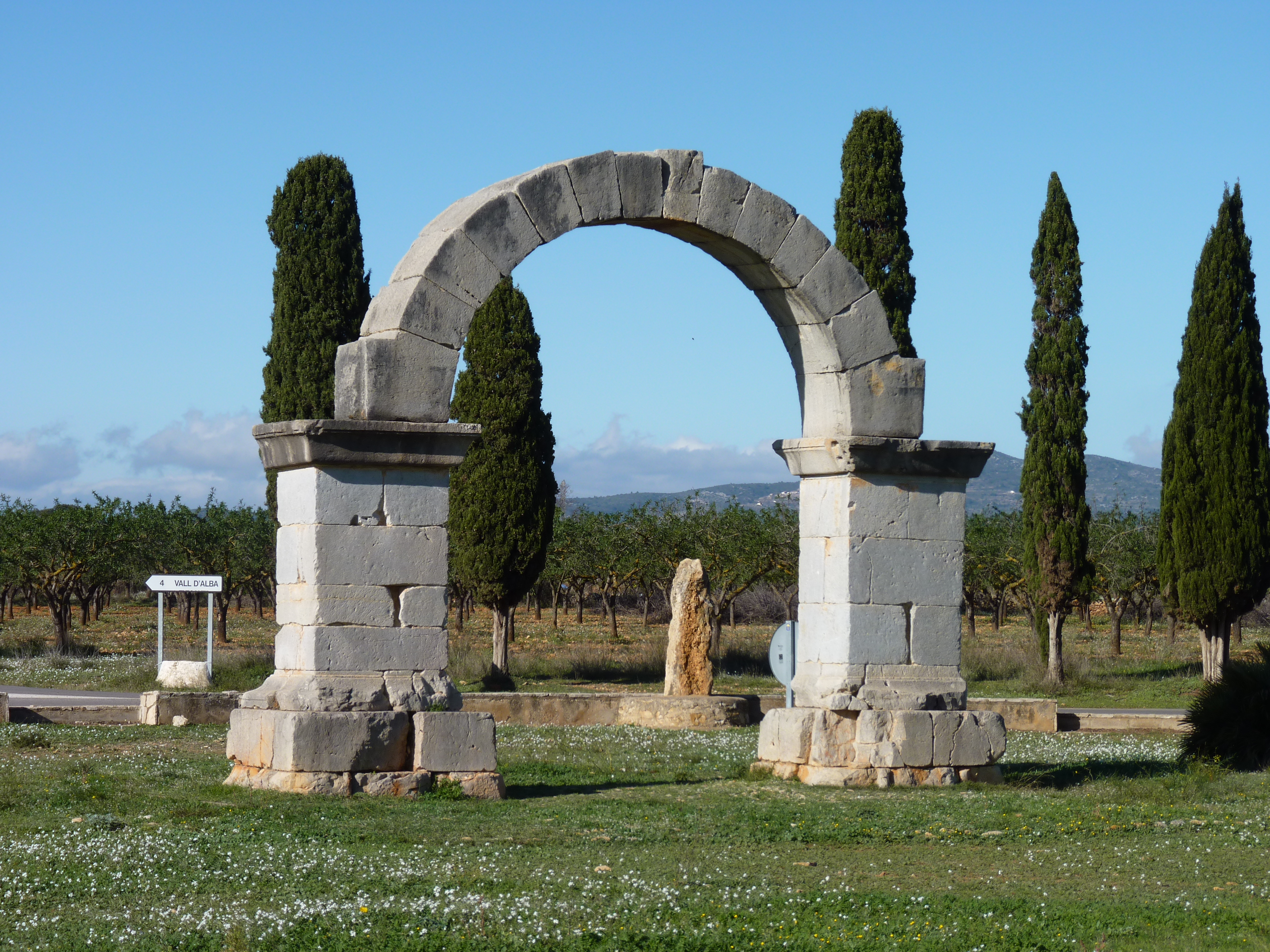

== Description ==
The monument is ruined – lacking most of the body above the archway. All that remains are the two pylons and the arch itself, while the entablature and spandrels have disappeared, as have the decorative elements, such as the mouldings of the fascia and the pylons. It is around 5.8 metres in height and 6.92 metres in width.

It was constructed of limestone, on a base of granite blocks, without mortar, of which the two quadrangular columns, including mouldings at the top and bottom, survive, as does the arch on top, a semicircle of fourteen wedge-shaped segments placed radially.

== See also ==
- List of Roman triumphal arches

== Bibliography ==
- Arasa Ferrán, L’Arc romà de Cabanes, Diputación provincial, Castellón 1989 (ISBN 84-86895-09-X)
