= Acinipo =

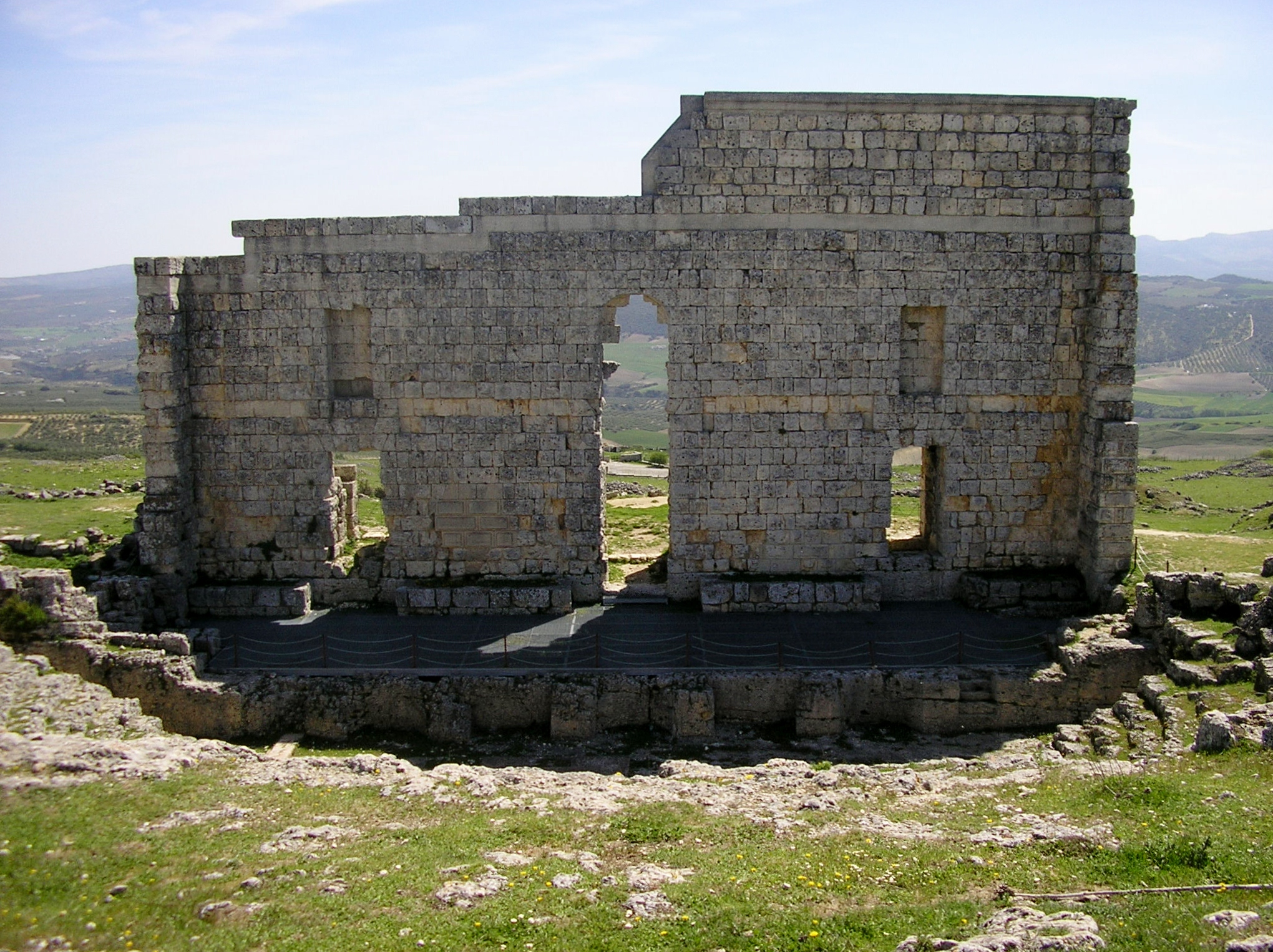
- The Roman theatre of Acinipo

- Location within Spain
- 36.832°N 5.239°W
- Type: Settlement
- Cultures: Roman
- Location: Province of Málaga, Spain
- Region: Hispania Baetica

History
- Built: 45 BC

Site notes
- Condition: In ruins

Acinipo was a city about 20 kilometers from Ronda, in the Spanish province of Málaga, believed to have been founded by retired soldiers from the Roman legions more than 2,000 years ago. The remaining ruins include a Roman theater still in use today. It is sometimes referred to as Ronda la Vieja (Old Ronda) despite the fact that Acinipo and Arunda (the original settlement of Ronda) co-existed for centuries.

== History ==
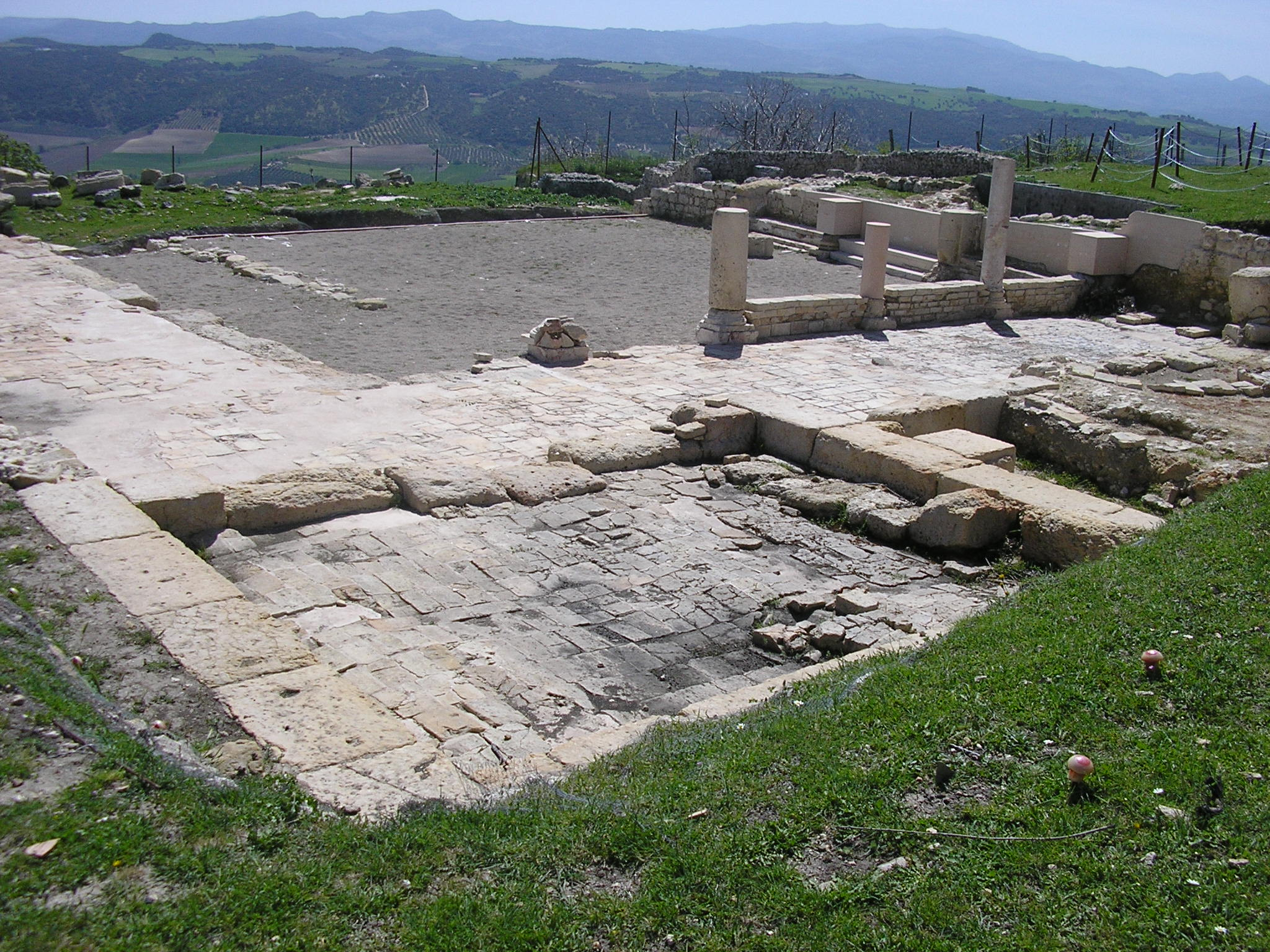
Roman baths of Acinipo.

Some historians assert that Acinipo was created after the battle of Munda (45 BC), fought between the armies of Julius Caesar and the army of Pompey's two sons, Gnaeus and Sextus. To Caesar, Munda was supposed to be a mop-up action after Pompey's main forces were defeated in Greece. But Munda was no mop-up exercise. Tens of thousands of Romans were killed on both sides; there was no decisive victory for Caesar's armies; and one of Pompey's sons, Sextus, fled to fight another day as a famous rebel pirate against Caesar's successor, Augustus.

Some Spanish historians state that Munda is the Roman name for Ronda, where the battle of Munda may have been fought. According to Pliny, the battle of Munda was fought in Osuna, about 50 km north of Ronda in the province of Seville. But there is general agreement that Acinipo was created for retired veterans of Caesar's legions, while Arunda (Ronda) would be a separate Roman outpost, perhaps created before the Munda conflict for the veterans of Pompey's legions.

Ptolemy calls it a town of the Celtici in Hispania Baetica set on a lofty mountain.
