= Cova de les Dones =

Archaeological site in Spain

Coordinates: 39.1767°N 0.7687°W

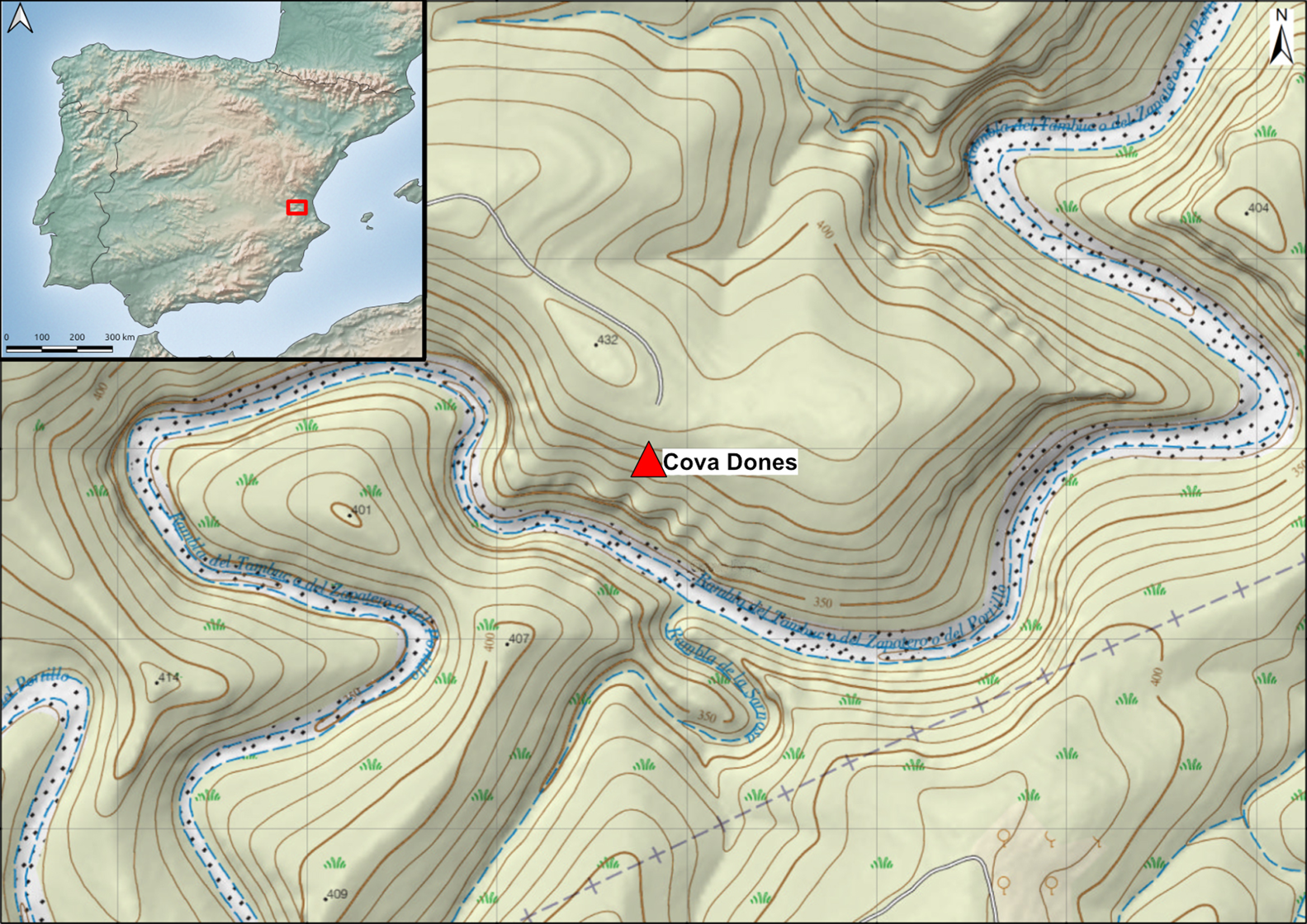
Location of Cova Dones

Cova de les Dones (Valencian for 'Women's Cave') is a cave in Millares, Spain, that contains Paleolithic rock art and ancient Roman artifacts. The earliest known record of the site dates back to 1795—it surfaces in a text authored by the Spanish botanist Antonio José Cavanilles.

== Archaeology ==
=== Prehistoric art ===
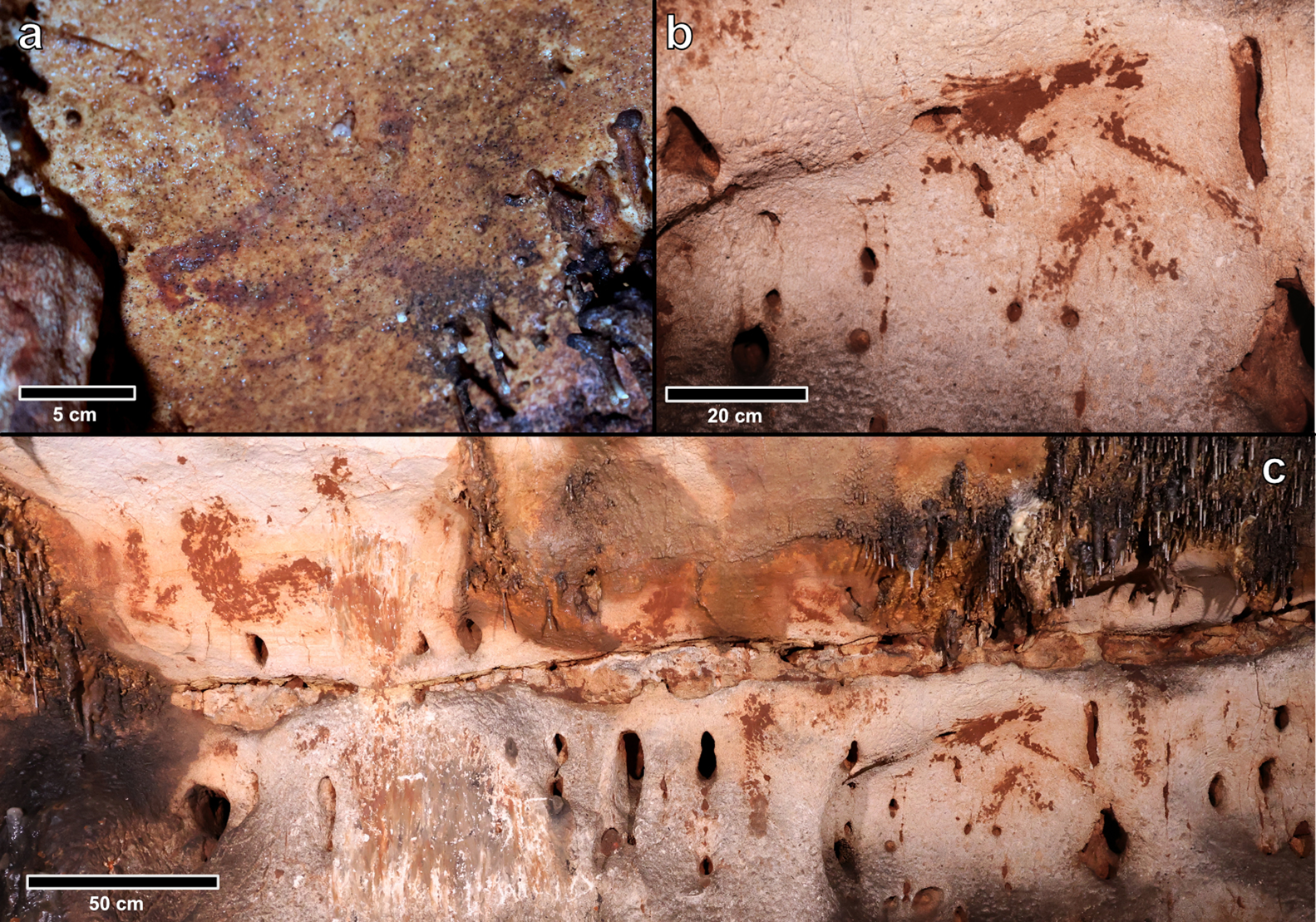
a) painted aurochs head; b) horse head made with clay; c) panel with several motifs painted with clay, including animals and signs (some partly covered by calcite layers)

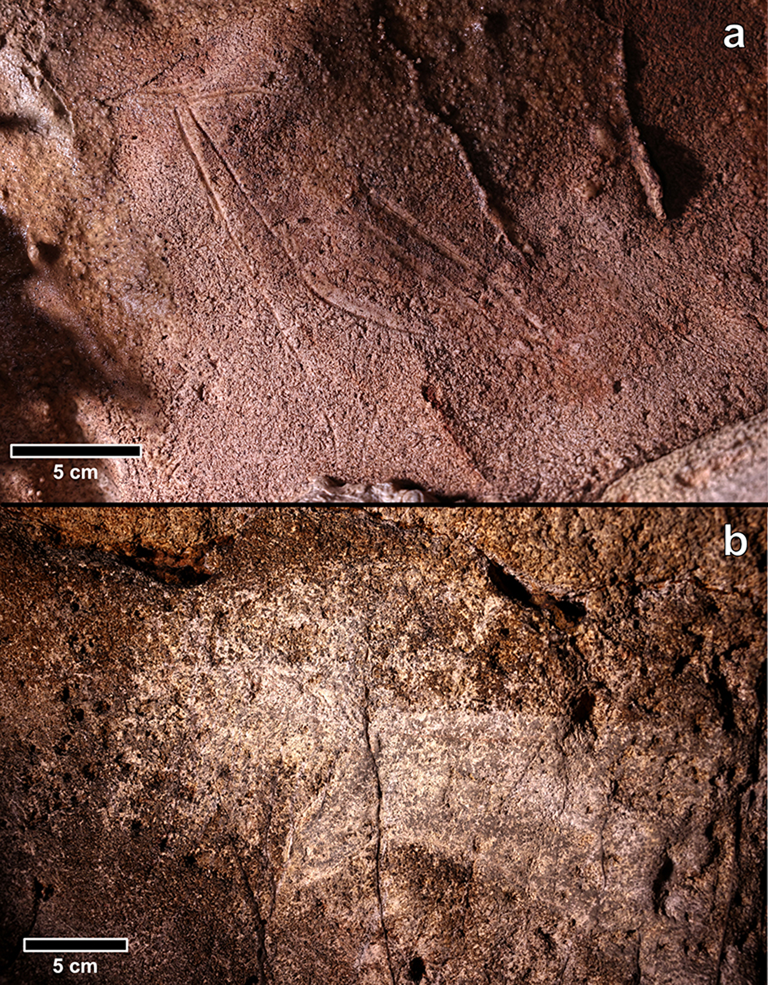
a) engraved 'Mediterranean trilinear hind'; b) two horse heads scraped on the wall surface

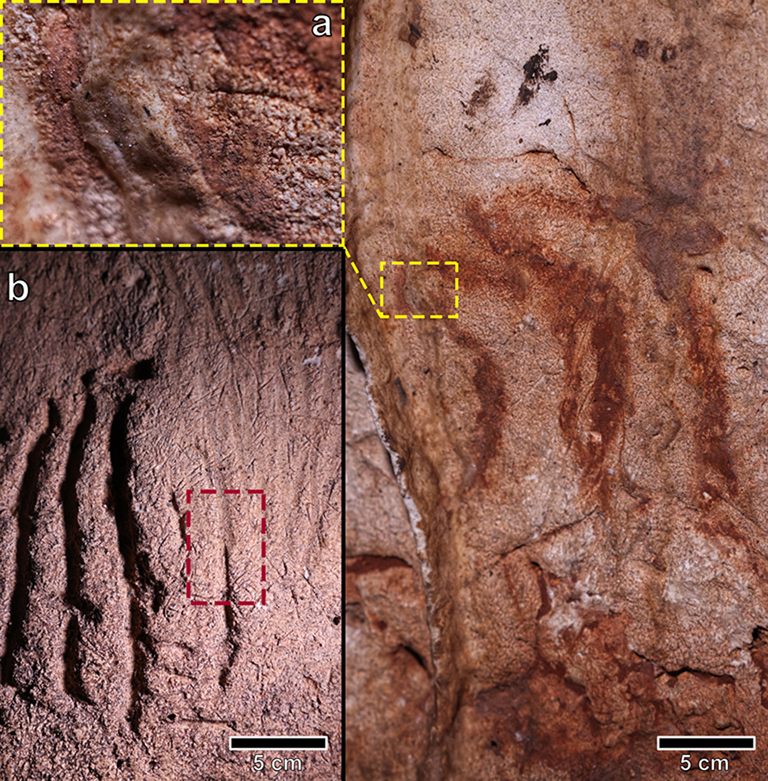
a) detail of a thick calcite layer partly covering a hind's head; b) detail of a bear-claw mark overlapping some finger flutings

Archaeological excavation in 1960 revealed the area contained Iron Age artifacts, although the prehistoric art was only uncovered in 2021. Initially, only four separate paintings were identified. However, later excavation in 2023 revealed that the site contained more than 110 distinct pieces of artwork located 500 meters deep within the cave. Ruiz-Redondo, Barciela, and Martorell consider this discovery significant for the broader study of prehistoric art in Iberia. They argue that, since the majority of known Iberian cave art is located in the Franco-Cantabarian region, any identification of cave paintings from other areas is crucial for advancing the study of prehistoric Iberia.

Much of the artwork was produced utilizing the fingers or the palms, although there is scant evidence of the usage of other tools. In one painting, a layer of calcite preserved various grooves in the stroke marks, which may have initially been created via the application of a sharp tool, such as a stalagmite. Other paintings throughout the cave include narrow lines also indicative of the usage of a sharp instrument. The most common pigment at the site, appearing in over 80 known samples, was red clay, a material that—although present in other Paleolithic sites across the Mediterranean—was infrequently employed in these areas. There is evidence that the prehistoric inhabitants of the site had obtained clay from at least 28 separate crevices throughout the cave, probably for the purpose of acquiring painting materials, although it is also possible that there were other motivations. One particular panel on the cave wall contains paintings situated nearby clay extraction sites, and it includes faint traces of stroke marks between the clay fissures and the artwork. It is possible that, at least in this instance, the provision of clay and the creation of the painting were performed in one, singular maneuver in which the artist first obtained the material before dragging their hand across the wall until they reached the painting. The Paleolithic residents of the cave also made use of moonmilk to shade their designs, a technique otherwise unknown in Iberian cave art and uncommon throughout all prehistoric art. Certain paintings were modified following their initial creation by later human activity, which—in some cases—could significantly alter the original design. In addition to human tampering, the paintings were also sometimes marred with claw or scratch marks left by other animals. The precise species to which these animals can be assigned is uncertain, although analysis of their size and positioning indicates that they largely belonged to bears, bats, or small carnivores.

The majority of the art consists of geometric shapes, such as rectangles, lines, or samples of finger fluting. It is difficult to date the surviving instances of these finger-tracings, although they are sufficiently old to have developed patina. One instance of artwork produced via this technique is marred by the preserved imprint of a cave bear, indicating that the design was produced prior to the extinction of the species, which is estimated to have occurred 24,000 years ago during the Last Glacial Maximum. Alongside the geometric shapes, there are 19 known animal portrayals in the cave: two depict an auroch, two depict unidentified animals, seven depict a horse, and there are eight depictions of deer, which can be further subdivided into seven depictions of female red deer and one depiction of a stag. Based on analysis of the auroch and horse paintings, the archaeologists Aitor Ruiz-Redondo, Virginia Barciela, Ximo Martorell date at least some of the paintings to before the Magdalenian age.

=== Speleofacts ===
Further excavation was conducted in 2024 as part of the DONARQ project, a research project that aims to thoroughly investigate the cave and its archaeological significance. This expedition unearthed evidence that the site contained speleofacts, or manmade structures formed from broken stalagmites. This discovery led to the inclusion of Iñaki Intxaurbe Alberdi within the research team, as Alberdi specializes in speleofact analysis. According to Alberdi, as of 2025, over 100 such speleofacts have been identified at the site. These modifications to the local geology may have borne some ritual or symbolic significance. Alternatively, they may have served to clear passages for cave-dwellers, potentially easing travel through the area. The precise date of these formations is unclear, although evidence of calcite regrowth around the broken stalagmites indicates that they are prehistoric. It is also possible that the artifacts in Cova Dones are related to the similar speleofacts found in Bruniquel Cave in France, which are dated to 175,000 years ago.

=== Roman artifacts ===
In 2025, the same team of researchers, in an expedition led by Ruiz-Redondo, uncovered a set of Roman artifacts located 200 meters deep into the cave. These artifacts included dozens of Roman inscriptions and a coin of the Emperor Claudius (r. 41–54) that was situated within a small hole in the roof of the cave next to a stalactite. Ruiz-Redondo suggests that the discovery of Roman artifacts indicates either that the Romans had discovered and occupied the cave independently or that it was continuously inhabited from the Paleolithic to the 1st-century CE.
