= Roman villa of Camino de Albalate =

Archeological site in Aragon, Spain

Coordinates: 40.9300°N 0.2018°E

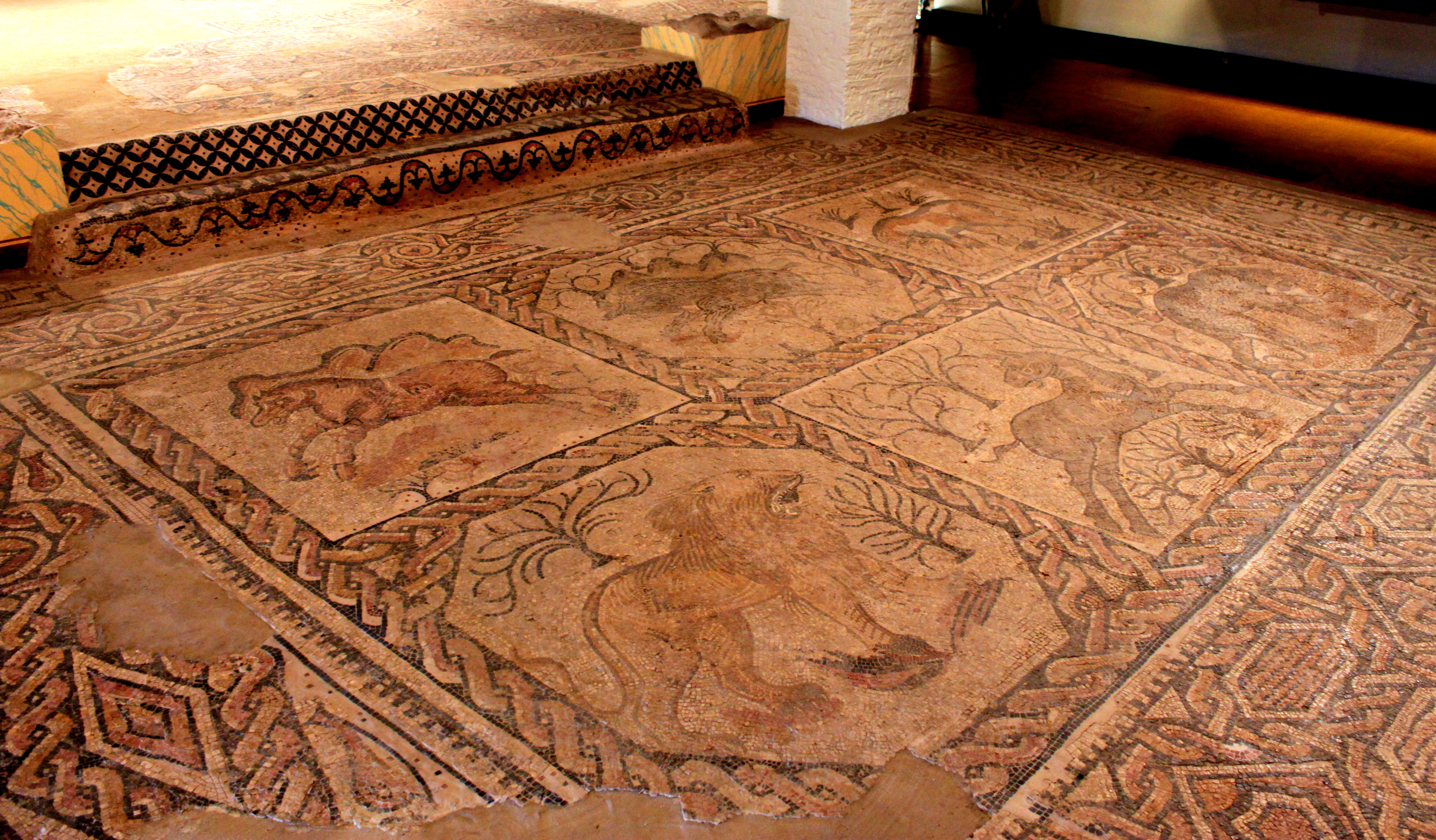
Roman mosaic.

Roman villa of Camino de Albalate is a Roman site near Calanda, Teruel, Aragon, Spain. The archaeological site, now dismantled, is located in the Albalate orchard area and is one of the most significant sites in the province of Teruel. The mosaic discovered there stands as the primary example of Roman culture in the aforementioned province.

== History ==
Discovered in January 1964 by Antonio Bielsa Alegre, the Camino de Albalate archaeological site serves as the key evidence of Roman Calanda, established by Tito Didio following the fall of the Celtiberian Calanda (Kolenda). The highlight of the site was the flooring of the large Roman villa that once stood there, from which its remarkable mosaic was rescued. This mosaic, of opus tesellatum, is polychrome and features varied themes.

== Bibliography ==
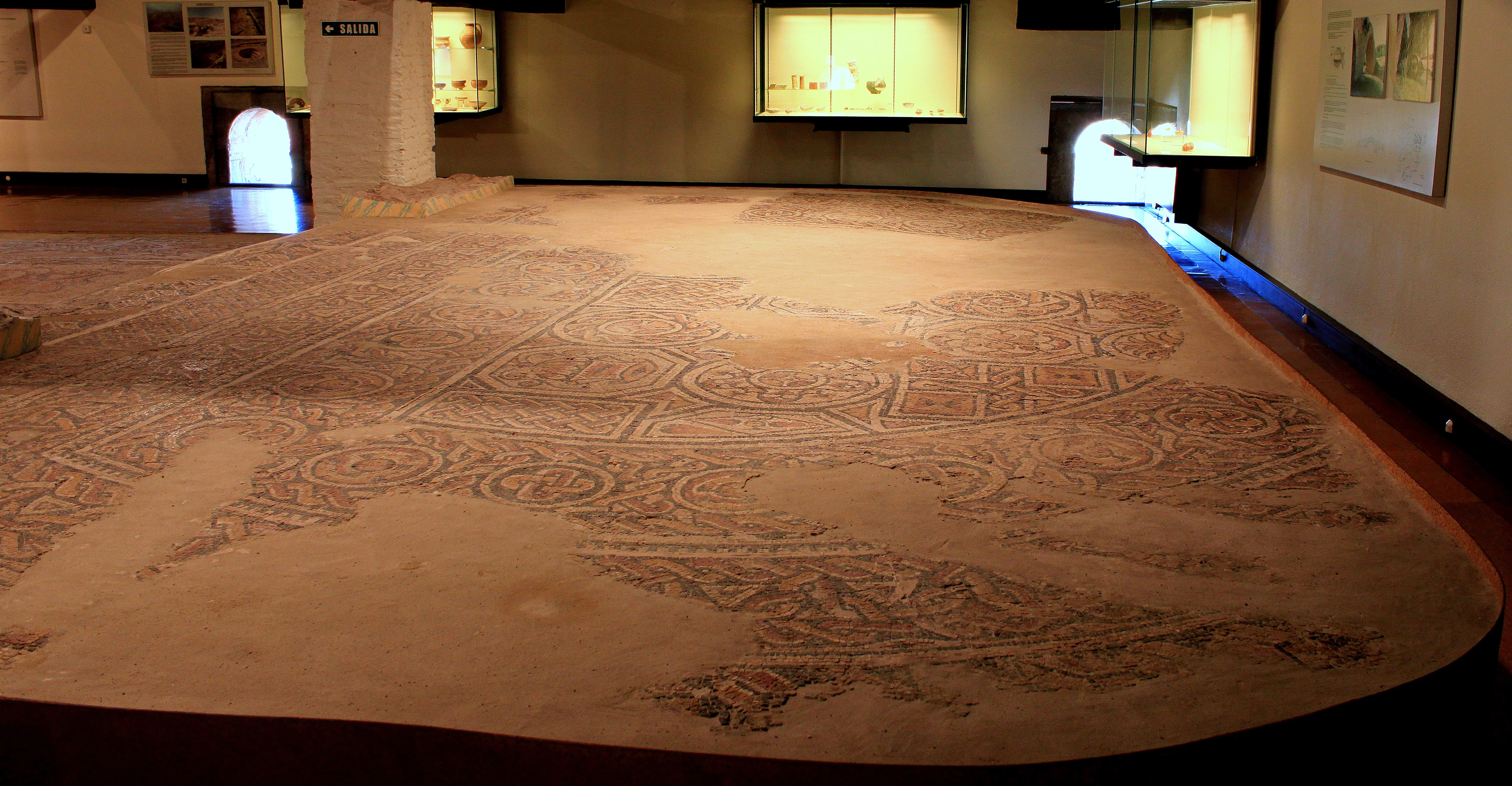
View of the villa.

- Artigas Gracia, M. A.: "Más de un millón de piedrecitas que pisó un terrateniente romano de Calanda", en Diario de Teruel, nº 24360 (24 de septiembre de 2017), pp. 32–33.
- Atrián Jordán, P.: Carta arqueológica de España: Teruel, Instituto de Estudios Turolenses, 1980, pp. 137–138.
- Bielsa Arbiol, J. A.: "Camino de Albalate, 1964–1965. El bienio dorado de la arqueología calandina", en Kolenda, n.os. 99 y 101, Agosto 2011 y Febrero 2012, Calanda (Teruel), pp. 16, 17.
- Blázquez Martínez, J. M.: "Mosaicos con animales de Calanda (Teruel)", en Homenaje a Purificación Atrián, Instituto de Estudios Turolenses, Teruel, 1996.
- Escribano Paño, Mª. V. & Fatás Cabeza, G.: La Antigüedad Tardía en Aragón (287–714), Caja de Ahorros de la Inmaculada de Aragón, Zaragoza, 2001, pp. 24 y ss.
- Fernández Galiano, D.: Mosaicos romanos del convento cesaraugustano, Zaragoza, 1987, pp. 101–102.
- García Entero, V.: Los balnea de las villae hispanorromanas. Provincia Tarraconense, Madrid, 2001, p. 254.
- García Miralles, M.: Historia de Calanda, Tipografía Artística Puertes, Valencia, 1969, pp. 13–14.
- Gisbert Santonja, J. A.: "El alfar de L´Almadrava (Setla-Mirarosa-Miraflor)-Dianium-. Materiales de construcción cerámicos. Producción y aproximación a su funcionalidad en la arquitectura del complejo artesanal", El ladrillo y sus derivados en la época romana. Monografías de arquitectura romana 4, Casa de Velázquez y UAM, Madrid, 1999, p. 80.
- González López, M.: Vajillas de importación no africanas en el noreste peninsular (s. V-VII). Distribución y Tipocronología, Archivo Español de Arqueología, 2007, vol. 80, pp. 207–238.
- Gorges, J. G.: Les villas hispano-romaines. Inventaire et problématiques archéologiques, París, 1979, p. 420.
- Guardia Pons, M.: Los mosaicos de la Antigüedad Tardía en Hispania, PPU, Barcelona, 1992, pp. 376, 532–533.
- López Ferrer, M.: "Alfileres y agujas de hueso en época romana: avance preliminar", en Actas del XXII Congreso Nacional de Arqueología, 1993, pp. 411–417.
- Martín Rodrigo, J.: Informe de las excavaciones realizadas en el yacimiento romano Camino de la Vega de Albalate, Calanda (Teruel). Año 1985., Arqueología Aragonesa 1985, Zaragoza, 1987.
- Paracuellos Massaro, P. A.. Prospecciones arqueológicas en los términos de Calanda y Foz-Calanda. Arqueología Aragonesa 1991, Diputación General de Aragón, Zaragoza, 1991.
- Paz Peralta, J. A.: Cerámica de mesa romana de los siglos III al VI d. C. en la provincia de Zaragoza, IFC, Zaragoza, 1991, pp. 211–213.
- Portolés Mombiela, Miguel, Historia de una rama de la familia Portolés, Copistería Lorente, Zaragoza, 2003, pp. 262–263.
- Redacción de La Vanguardia Española, "Descubrimiento de un mosaico romano en Calanda", en La Vanguardia, 28 de febrero de 1964, p. 8.
- Roldán Hervás, J. M. (dir.), Diccionario Akal de la Antigüedad hispana, Akal, Madrid, 2006.
- Sanz Gamo, R.: "Algunos materiales romanos utilizados en la construcción de las concamerationes", en Oretum nº 3, 1987, pp. 225–236.
- Sanz Martínez, M.: Calanda. De la Edad de Piedra al siglo XX, Imprenta Artis-Graf, Reus, 1970, pp. 17–20.
- Severino, B.: "Una joya del subsuelo calandino", en La Comarca (Periódico independiente del Bajo Aragón Histórico), nº 2154 (6 de octubre de 2017), p. 10.
- VV.AA.: "Hallazgos de mosaicos romanos en Hispania", V Coloquio Internacional sobre Mosaicos Antiguos, Bath, 1987.
- VV.AA.: "Un abocador del segle V d. C. en el Fòrum Provincial de Tàrraco. Tarragona", Memòries d´excavació 2, Taller Escola D´Arqueologia, Ayuntamiento de Tarragona, 1989, pp. 386–389.
