= Cáparra =

Ancient Roman village in Spain

Coordinates: 40.1666°N 6.1010°W

- Municipium Flavium Caparensis (Latin)
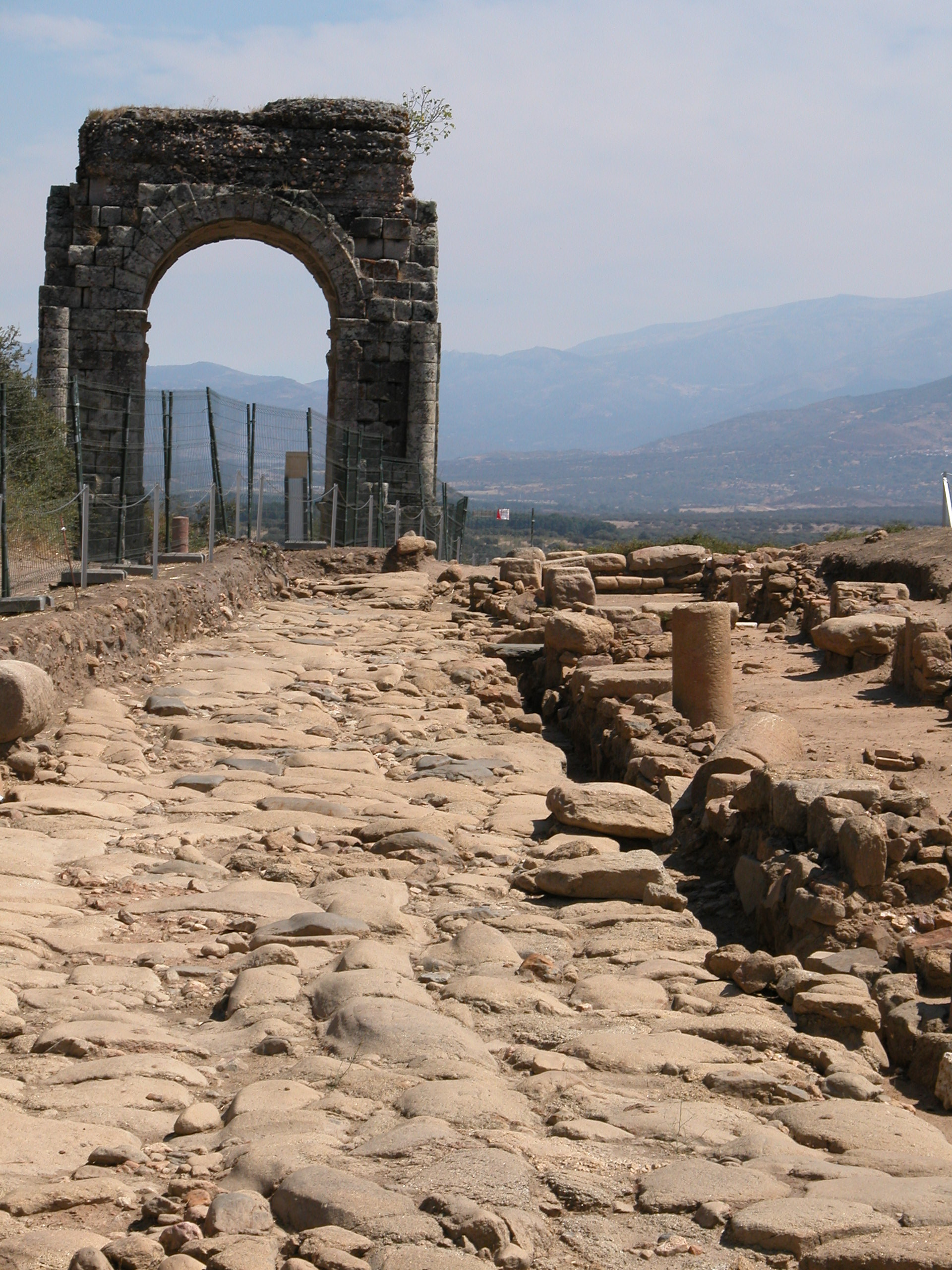
- View of the quadrifrons gate which was the entrance to Capara's forum
- Interactive map of Cáparra
- Type: Ciudad
- Periods: Roman empire
- Associated with: Initially Vettones; from 74 Latin and Roman citizens.
- Location: near Guijo de Granadilla and Oliva de Plasencia (Spain)

History
- Built: 1st century. Municipium from 74.
- Abandoned: 9th century
- Bien de interés cultural RI-55-0000016 catalogued as an Archaeological Zone and protected since 3 June 1931

The Roman city of Cáparra is located in the north of Extremadura (Spain) in the valley of the River Alagón. In Roman times it was in the province of Lusitania within the Conventus Iuridicus Emeritensis, whose capital was Colonia Augusta Emerita (modern day Mérida). It was approached via the Roman road known as the Vía de la Plata and is now permanently abandoned. It is said to have been a pre-Roman city, although this remains unconfirmed and has been questioned by some authors, on the grounds that the flat location did not meet the defensive requirements of a pre-Roman town and only a few pottery remains have been found.

The walled city covered an area of approximately 15-16 hectares, although it is known that in the area northwest of the city there were many houses, so that the settled area is thought to have been much larger than the walled area. The city was smaller and less important than some other Roman cities of the Iberian Peninsula, but was among the main population centres between the Tagus river and the Sierra de Gredos, along with Caurium (Coria), Augustobriga (Talavera la Vieja) and Egitania (Idanha-a-Velha).

Its urban organisation corresponds to an orthogonal plan, with the Vía de la Plata as the principal axis, passing through the city in a north-south direction.

The name of the city is not originally Latin, but pre-Roman, probably Veton, just as the origin of the settlement. The name has several variations, such as Capara, Capera and Kapasa. Possibly its significance derives from those roots which could indicate a centre for exchange, bartar, and trade, inasmuch as the position of Cáparra is at the meeting of two roads, one leading to El Jerte through the Puerto de San Gamello and the other to the Roman bridges over the Ambroz and the Pontoon in the Alagón.

== Bibliography ==
- Cerrillo, E. "(2000): “Capara, municipio romano”, Sociedad y cultura en Lusitania romana (Actas de la IV Mesa Redonda Internacional), Mérida, 2000, pp. 155–164.
- Río-Miranda Alcón, J. (2011), La ciudad romana de Cáparra. Municipium Flavium Caparense, Cáceres, pp. 15–340
- Río-Miranda Alcón, J. (2012), La ciudad romana de Cáparra. La Cerámica, Cáceres.
