= Munigua =

- Municipium Flavium Muniguense (Latin)
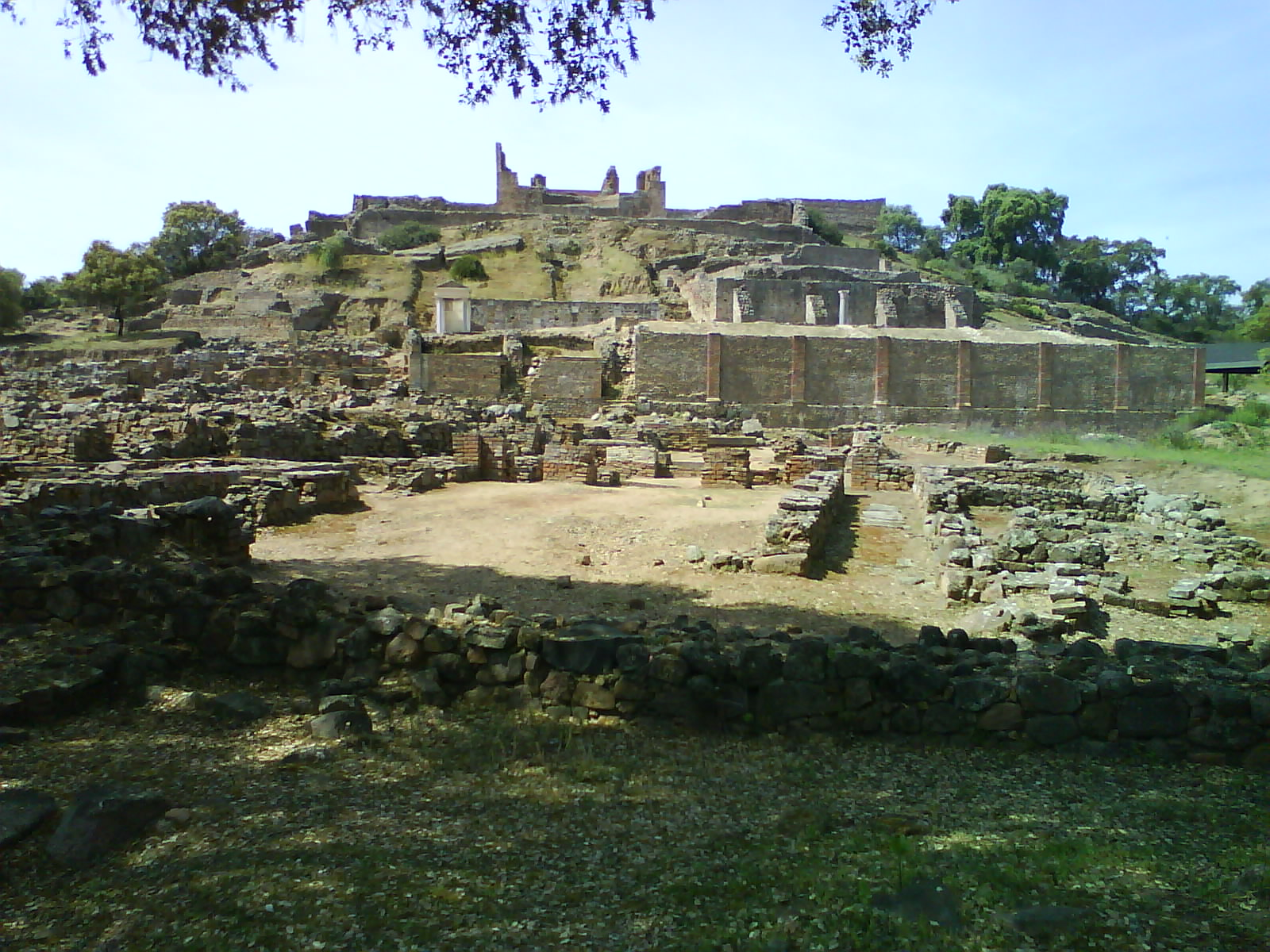
- Eastern slope of the site with private and public buildings

- Location within Province of Seville Location within Andalusia Location within Spain
- 37°42′47.3″N 5°44′26.17″W
- Location: Villanueva del Río y Minas, Province of Seville, Spain

Munigua is the site of the Roman city of Municipium Flavium Muniguense and is located 8 km from Villanueva del Río y Minas, in the province of Seville. Its origins are pre-Roman and it flourished between the 1st and 3rd centuries AD.

Extensive remains can be seen and it has the designation of Historical Artistic Monument.

== History ==
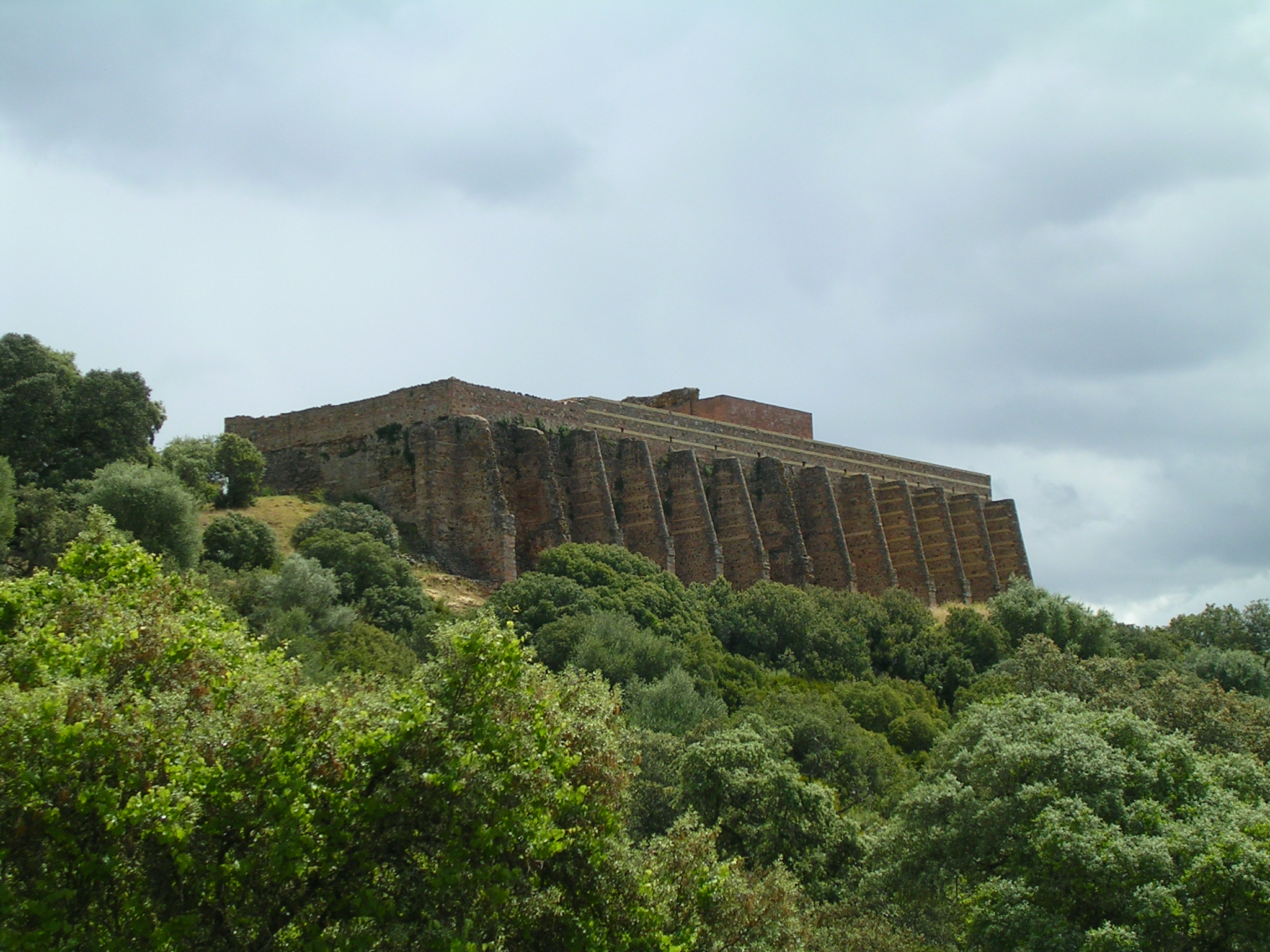
Western Wall of the Sanctuary

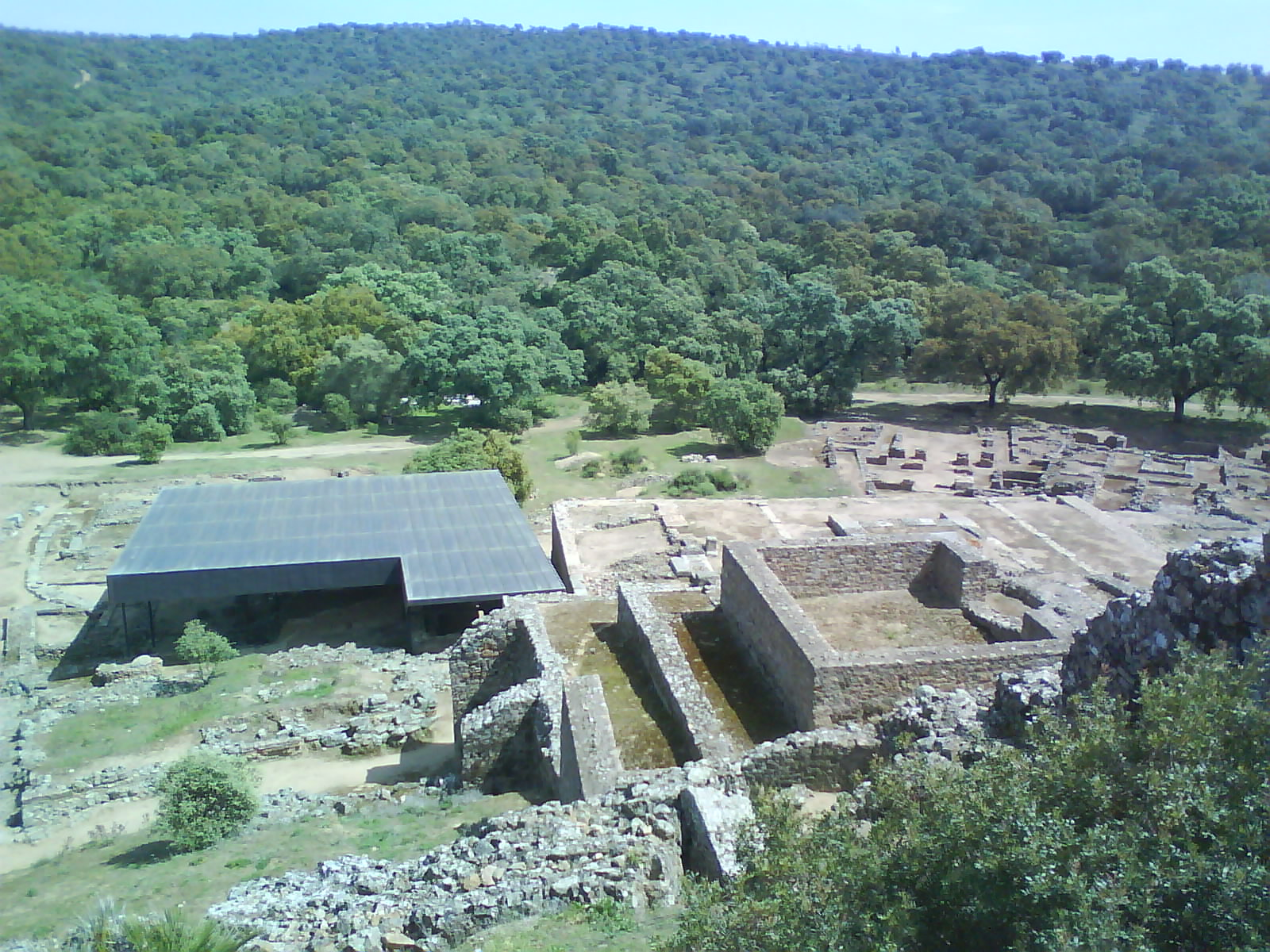
Temple of the Podium

Munigua's location was related to the copper and iron mines in this area.

The oldest ceramic materials from the site are Punic from the 7th century BC. The pre-Roman Iberian settlement was located on the top of the hill.

During the 1st c. BC and the first half of the 1st c. AD mining is evidenced in what were later the hot springs, the forum and houses 1 and 5.

Although some of the architectural remains visible today correspond to buildings from the Augustan period, most of the public and religious buildings were erected during the construction boom of the last third of the 1st century AD when the Emperor Vespasian granted it the status of municipium.

Buildings near the top of the hill were demolished for the construction of the Terrace Sanctuary in around 70 AD. The baths were remodeled during the construction of the Forum, built at the end of that century. Houses 1, 5 and 6 in the street of the baths were built between the end of the 1st century and the beginning of the 2nd century. House 2 is also from this time and both this House and Houses 1 and 6 must have belonged to families of local elite owing to their proximity to the administrative and religious centres of the city.

The walls of Munigua, built in the last third of the 2nd century AD were already in ruins in the 3rd century, and were never finished since the western side was open. Their layout was unusual as they followed the necropolis boundaries and construction affected the Southern and Eastern necropolises so that some of the tombs were included, incomprehensibly, inside the city.

At the end of the 3rd century the city suffered an earthquake, as indicated in the houses, in the Forum and in the two-story portico. This marked the beginning of its decline.

Many Greco-Roman sculptures have been found and numerous Greek, Roman, Iberian and Arab vase fragments.

== Archaeological site ==
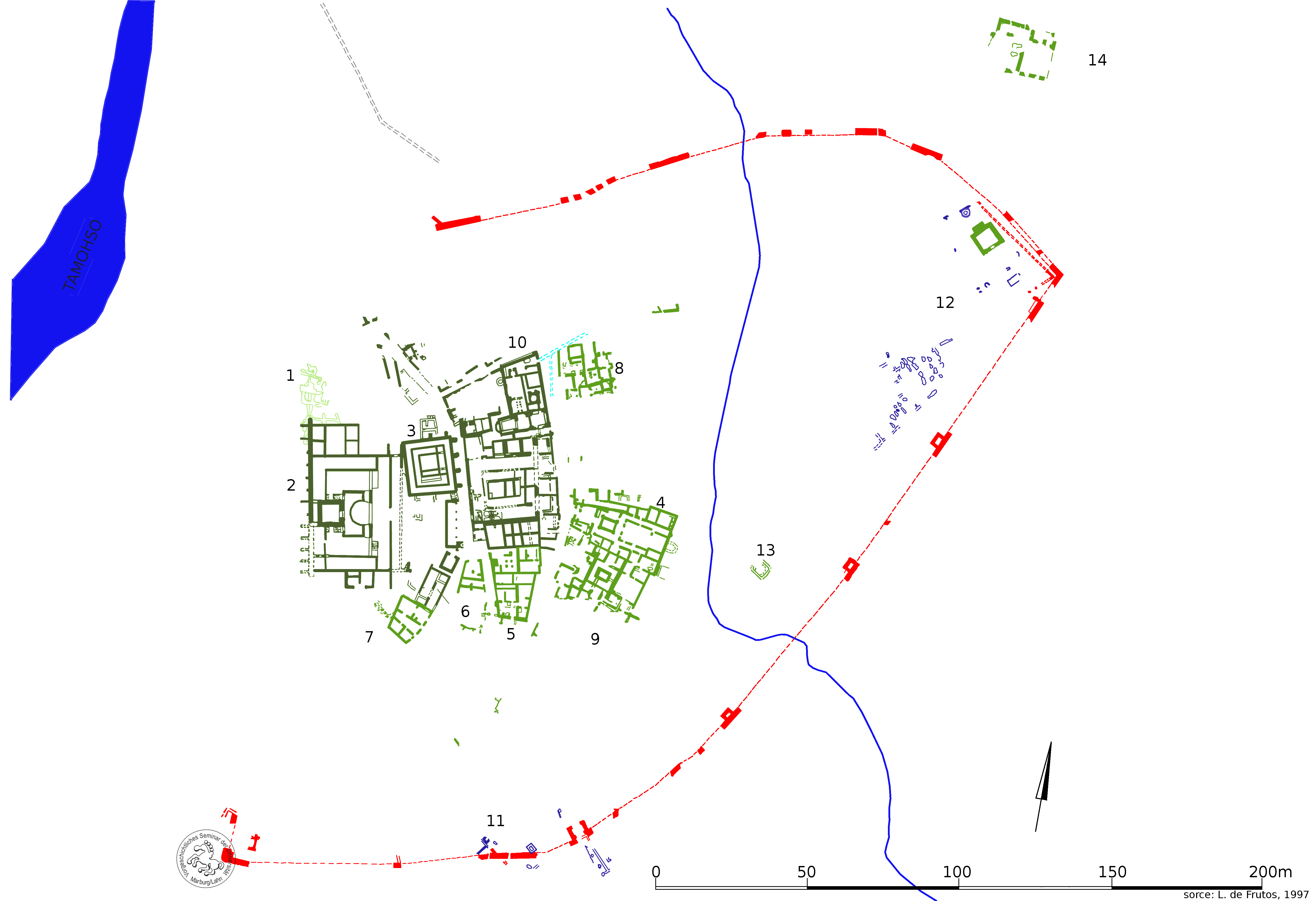
Map of Munigua

Main remains include:

- The walls
- The Terrace Sanctuary
- The Temple of the Podium
- The two-story Portico
- The temple of Mercury
- The Forum
- The thermal baths
- The Houses

Recently archaeologists have found an extensive Roman copper mine overlying a much older mine from around 2000 BC begun by the Turdetani. The enormous system included ventilated interconnected tunnels and deep shafts.
