= Antonio Bielsa Alegre =

Antonio Bielsa Alegre (1929–2008) was an Aragonese archaeologist born in Calanda in the Spanish comarca of Bajo Aragón.

== Excavations ==
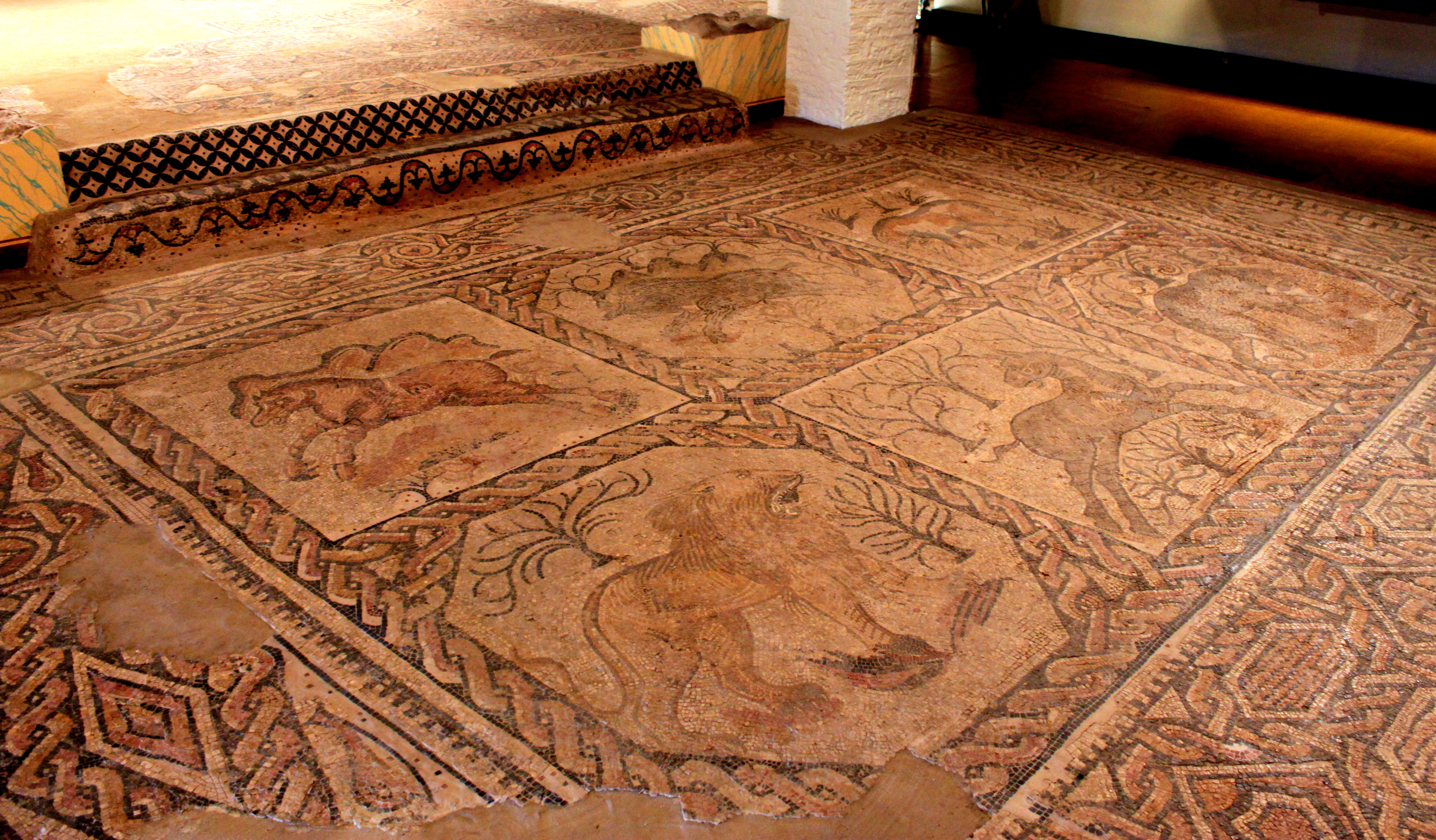
Camino de la Vega de Albalate: Mosaic.

- 1964: Roman villa of Camino de Albalate

== Bibliography ==
- García Miralles, Manuel, Historia de Calanda, Tipografía Artística Puertes, Valencia, 1969, pp. 13-14.
- Sanz Martínez, Manuel, Calanda. De la Edad de Piedra al siglo XX, Imprenta Artis-Graf, Reus, 1970, pp. 17-20.
- Severino, B.: "Una joya del subsuelo calandino", en La Comarca (Periódico independiente del Bajo Aragón Histórico), nº 2154 (6 de octubre de 2017), p. 10.
