= Roman bridge of Talamanca de Jarama =

Cultural property in Talamanca de Jarama, Spain

- Puente Romano de Talamanca de Jarama (Spanish)
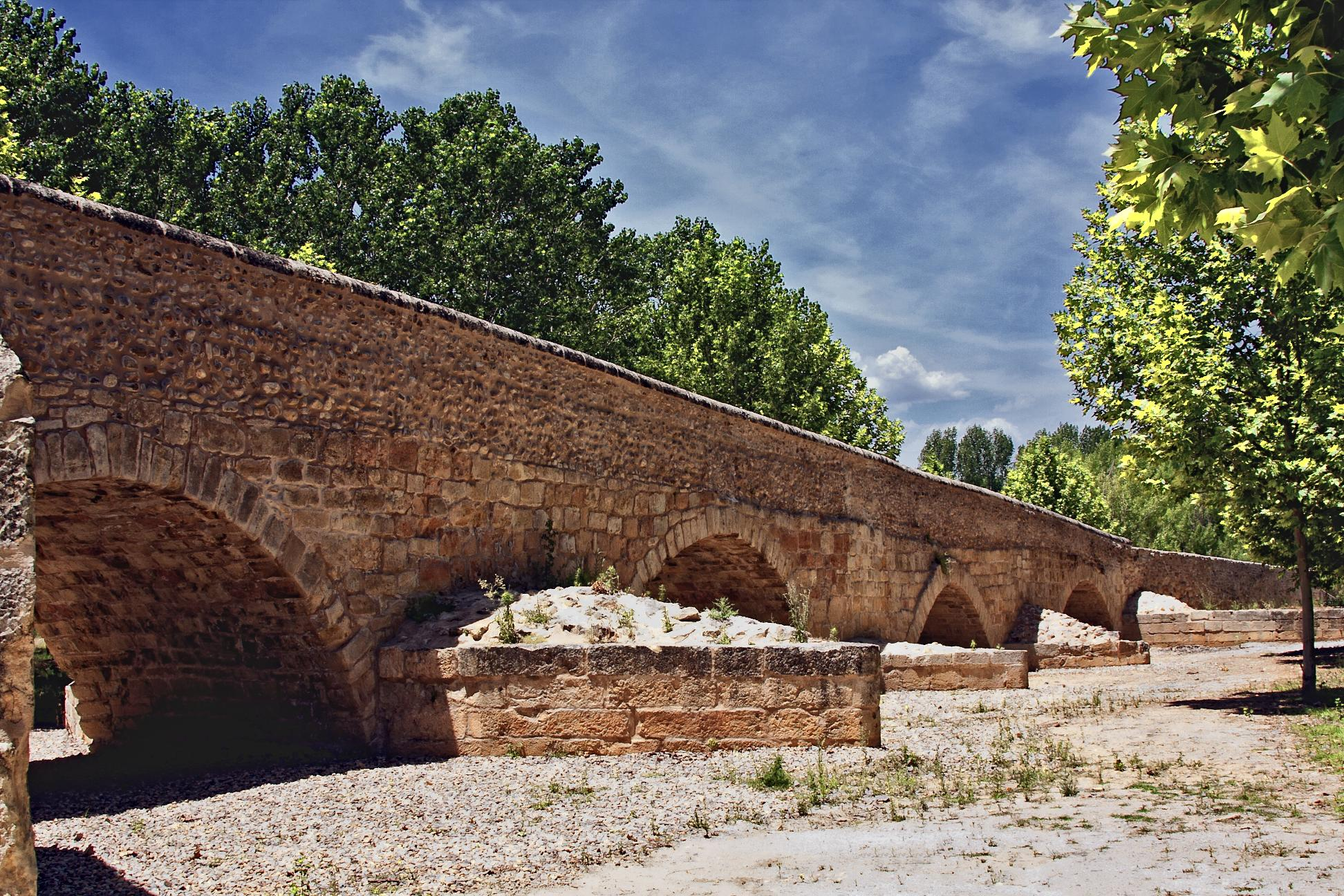

- Location within Spain
- 40.751062°N 3.51996°W
- Location: Talamanca de Jarama, Spain

Spanish Cultural Heritage
- Official name: Puente Romano de Talamanca de Jarama
- Type: Non-movable
- Criteria: Monument
- Designated: 1996
- Reference no.: RI-51-0009585

The Puente Romano de Talamanca de Jarama is a Roman bridge located in Talamanca de Jarama, in the Community of Madrid, Spain.

The bridge is Roman in origin. It was remodelled in medieval times. It no longer crosses the river Jarama, as the river has changed course. Under the name Puente Sobre El Arroyo del Caz, it was declared Bien de Interés Cultural in 1996 (RI-51-0009585).
