= Roman circus of Mérida =

Ancient Roman circus in Mérida, Spain

Roman circus of Merida
- Circo Romano de Merida (Spanish)
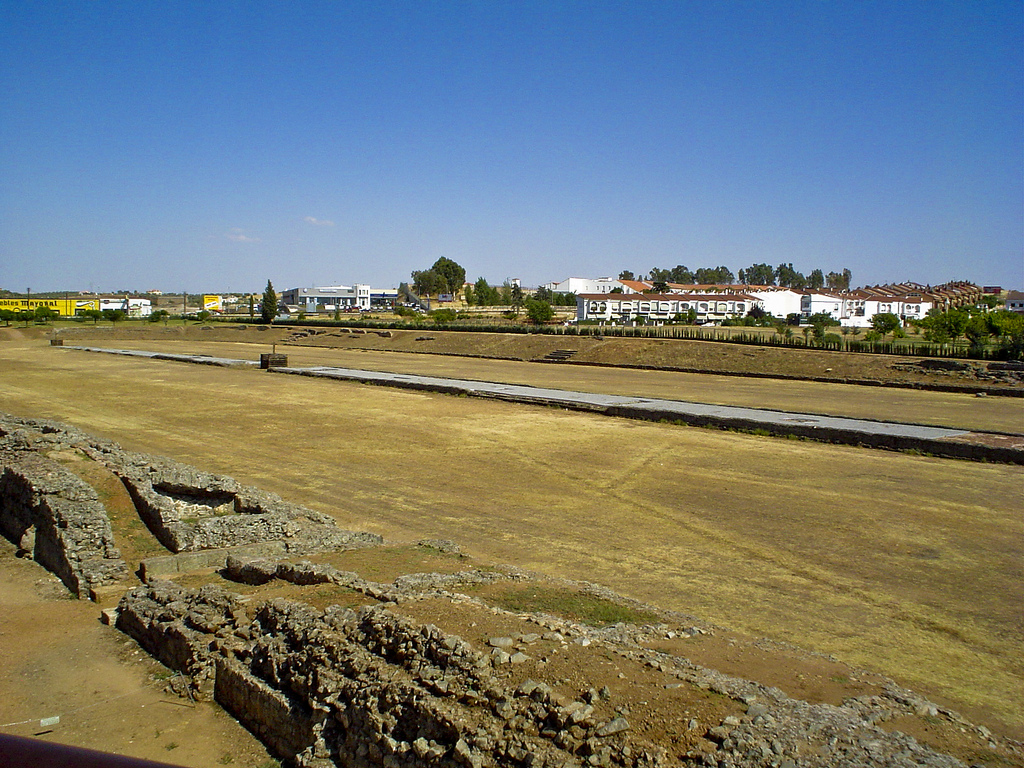
- View of the Roman circus
- Interactive map of Roman circus of Merida
- 38°54′58″N 6°20′16″W
- Type: Roman circus
- Location: Mérida (Badajoz), Spain

UNESCO World Heritage Site
- Official name: The Roman Circus
- Type: Cultural
- Criteria: iii, iv
- Designated: 1993 (17th session)
- Part of: Archaeological Ensemble of Mérida
- Reference no.: 664-010
- Region: Europe and North America
- Area: 5.9935 ha (14.810 acres)
- Buffer zone: 20.87 ha (51.6 acres)

Spanish Cultural Heritage
- Official name: Circo Romano
- Type: Non-movable
- Criteria: Monument
- Designated: 13 December 1912
- Reference no.: RI-51-0000109

The Roman circus of Mérida is a Roman circus in the Roman colonia of Emerita Augusta –present-day Mérida, Spain–, capital of the Roman province of Lusitania. Used for chariot racing during ancient Rome, it was modelled on the Circus Maximus in Rome and other circus buildings throughout the Empire. Measuring more than 400 m (1,300 ft) in length and 30 m (98 ft) width, it could house up to 30,000 spectators. Although currently in ruins, it is one of the best preserved examples of Roman circus.

It is part of the Archaeological Ensemble of Mérida, which is one of the largest and most extensive archaeological sites in Spain and that was declared a World Heritage Site by UNESCO in 1993.

== History ==
There is no consensus about the circus' dating, as it was built and used for several years before its official dedication. It seems to have been built sometime around 20 BC and inaugurated some 30 years later. It was located far outside the city walls, but close to the road that connected the city to Toledo and Córdoba.

After the fall of the Western Roman Empire and the rise of Christianity in Spain, the circus saw more use than the other Roman structures of Mérida, since racing was considered less sinful than spectacles performed in the Theatre and the Amphitheatre.

== Modern status ==
Mérida's circus remains very well preserved. As is true with the Circus Maximus, most circuses's structures have been destroyed over time as the area occupied by them was great and often in very flat land near their respective cities. The Mérida circus however has kept numerous structures, including the Porta Pompae ("main entrance"), the Porta Triumphalis ("triumph gate"), the spina (the longitudinal wall), the tribunal iudicium ("tribune of the judges").

A museum dedicated to the circus now sits near the middle edge of the circus grounds and it allows admittance into the fenced area around the circus remains.

The City Council of Mérida organizes the “Gran Circus Maximus”, a representation of a chariot race with a historical setting in which the public is able to access the monument as long as they wear their Roman clothing.

== See also ==
- Archaeological Ensemble of Mérida
- Hippodrome – a Greek arena also used for chariot racing
