= Lists of Bienes de Interés Cultural =

Bien de Interés Cultural is a category in the Spanish heritage register. It covers various types of cultural heritage, which fall into sub-categories such as monuments, historic gardens, etc.

== By province or area ==
- A Coruña
- Álava
- Albacete
- Alicante
- Almería
- Asturias
- Ávila
- Badajoz
- Balearic Islands
- Barcelona
- Biscay
- Burgos
- Cáceres
- Cádiz
- Cantabria
- Castellón
- Ceuta
- Ciudad Real
- Córdoba
- Cuenca
- Gipuzkoa
- Girona
- Granada
- Guadalajara
- Huelva
- Huesca
- Jaén
- La Rioja
- Las Palmas
- León
- Lleida
- Lugo
- Madrid
- Málaga
- Murcia
- Navarre
- Ourense
- Palencia
- Pontevedra
- Salamanca
- Santa Cruz de Tenerife
- Segovia
- Seville
- Soria
- Tarragona
- Teruel
- Toledo
- Valencia
- Valladolid
- Zamora
- Zaragoza

== See also ==
- Bien de Interés Cultural
- Patrimonio histórico español
