= List of Bienes de Interés Cultural in the Balearic Islands =

This is a list of Bien de Interés Cultural landmarks in the Balearic Islands.

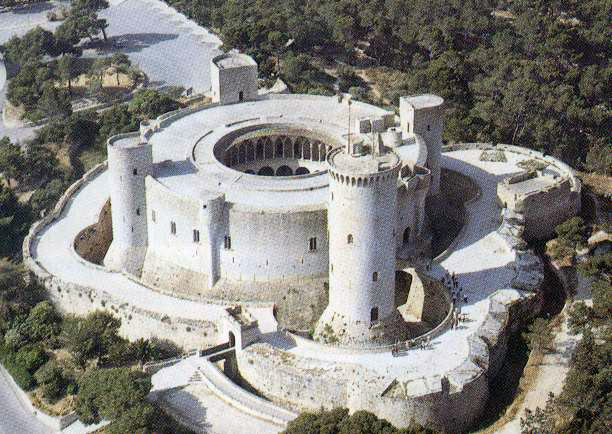
Bellver Castle

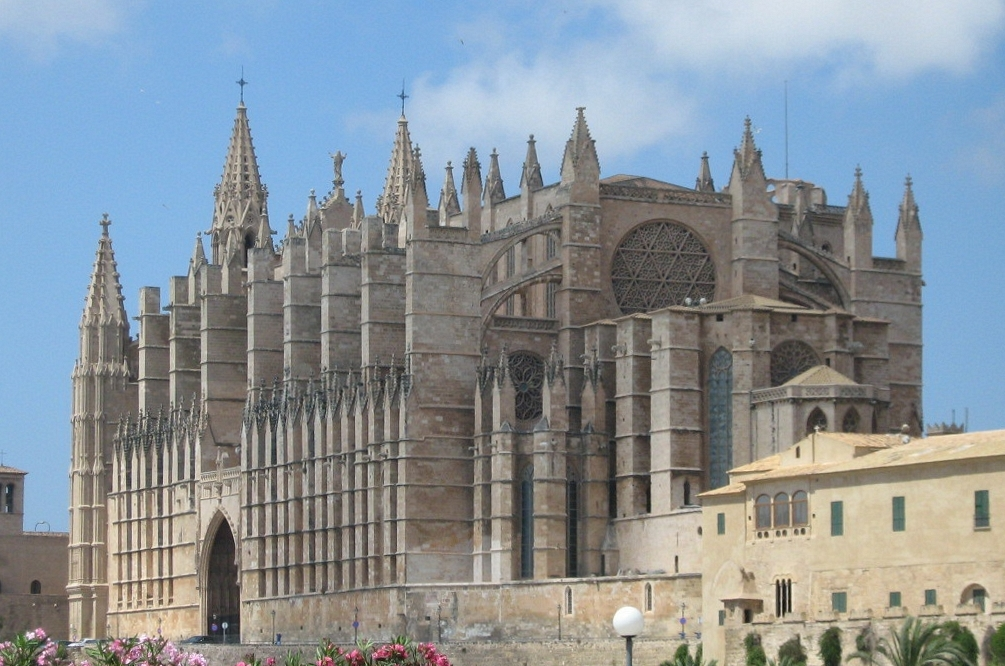
"La Seu" Cathedral of Palma

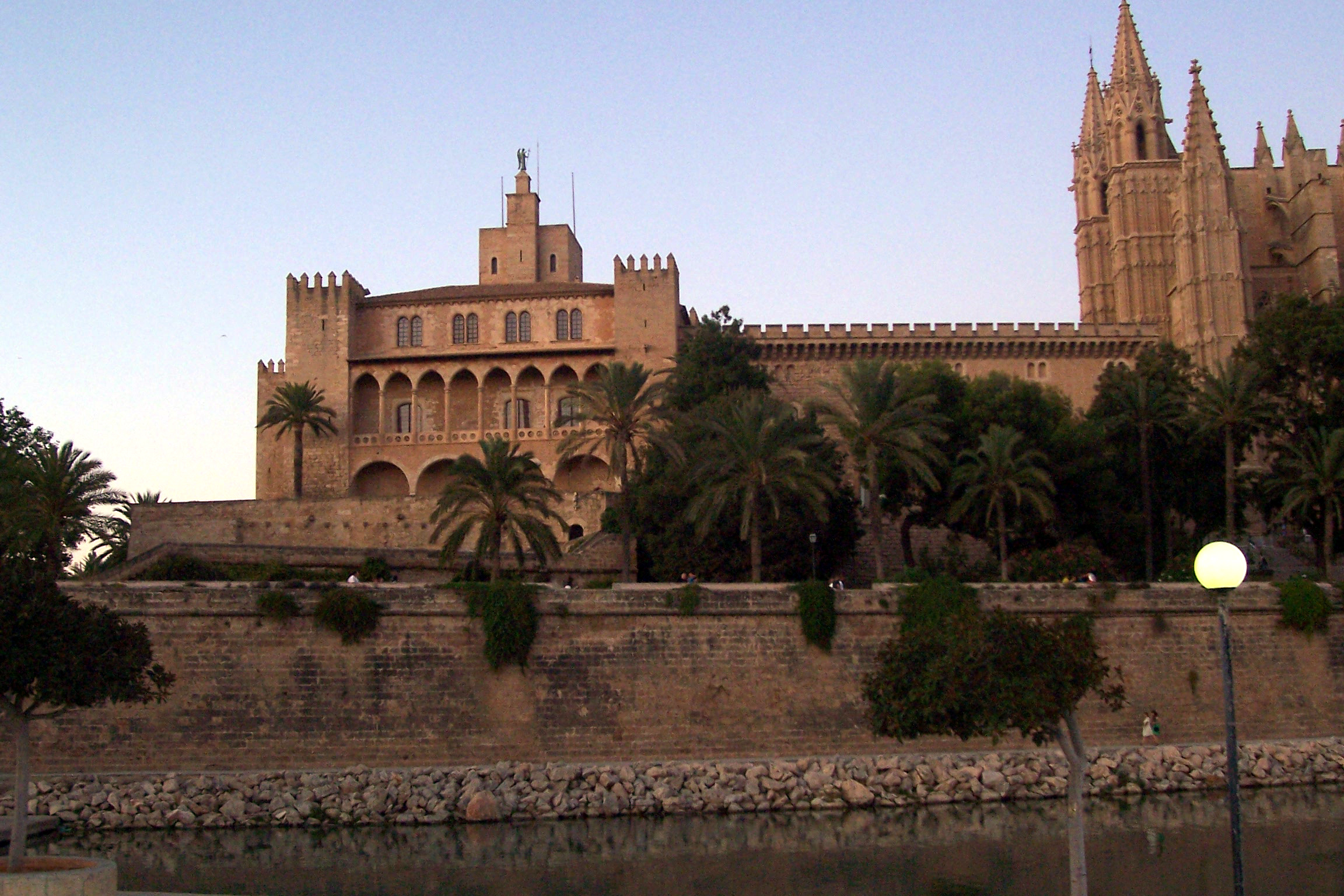
Palacio Real de La Almudaina

Mallorca

- Bellver Castle
- Caves of Drach
- Gran Hotel (Palma)
- Alpara Hypostyle hall
- Son Piris Hypostyle hall
- Son Sarparets Hypostyle hall
- Na Nova
- Palma Cathedral
- Royal Palace of La Almudaina
- Valldemossa Charterhouse

Menorca

- Castle of Santa Àgueda
- Naveta d'Es Tudons
- Sant Antoni Castle
- Castillo de Amer
- Torre d'en Galmés

Ibiza

- Sant Joan de Labritja
