= List of Bienes de Interés Cultural in the Province of Málaga =

This is a list of Bien de Interés Cultural landmarks in the Province of Málaga, Spain.

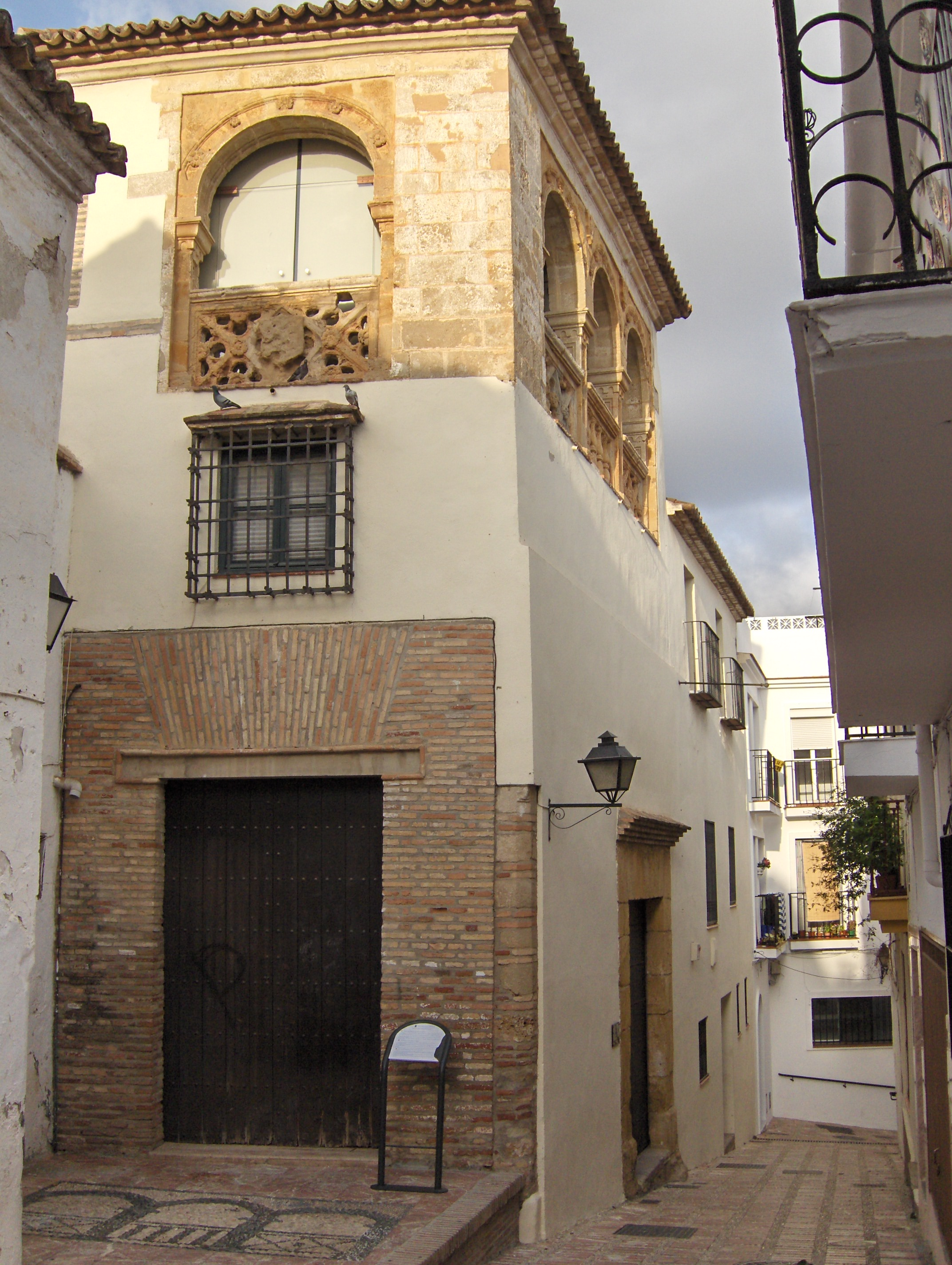
Hospital Bazán

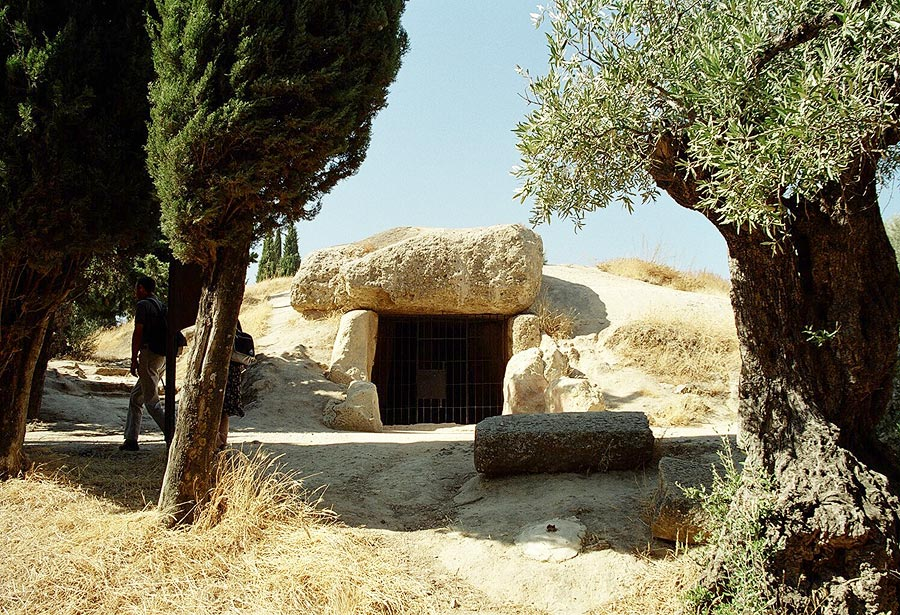
Entrance to the cave

- Acinipo
- Alcazaba of Antequera
- Cueva de Menga
- Alcazaba of Málaga
- Buenavista Palace (Málaga)
- Caves of Nerja
- Cueva de la Pileta
- Dolmen de Viera
- Fundación Picasso
- Hospital Bazán
- Málaga Cathedral
- Museo de Málaga
- Plaza de Toros de Ronda
- Sohail Castle
- Torre Ladrones
- Villa romana de Río Verde
