= Fort of the Purísima Concepción =

Fort in Melilla, Spain

Coordinates: 35.2833°N 2.9653°W

- Fuerte de la Purísima Concepción
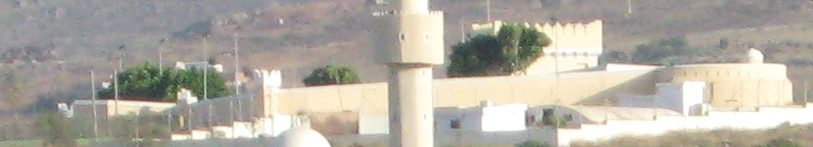
- Type: Cultural Interest Asset in the category of Natural Heritage Site
- Period/culture: XIX century
- Present location: Spain, Melilla

The Fort of the Purísima Concepción, also referred to as the Fort of Sidi-Guariach, is one of the outer forts of the Spanish city of Melilla. It is located near the Frontera de Melilla and has been designated as a Cultural Heritage Site (Bien de Interés Cultural).

== History ==
The fort was built to defend Melilla from attacks by the Rif tribes. However, the commencement of its construction triggered the Margallo War due to its proximity to a morabo, an Islamic sanctuary. After losing its defensive function, it became the first barracks of the Regulares corps. Currently, it houses the Reception Center for Children (Centro de Acogida de Menores).

== Description ==
The fort features a square layout with an inner courtyard around which the rooms are arranged. At the center of the courtyard stands a square tower.
