= Almonaster la Real Mosque =

Mosque in Huelva, Andalusia, Spain

- Mezquita de Almonaster la Real
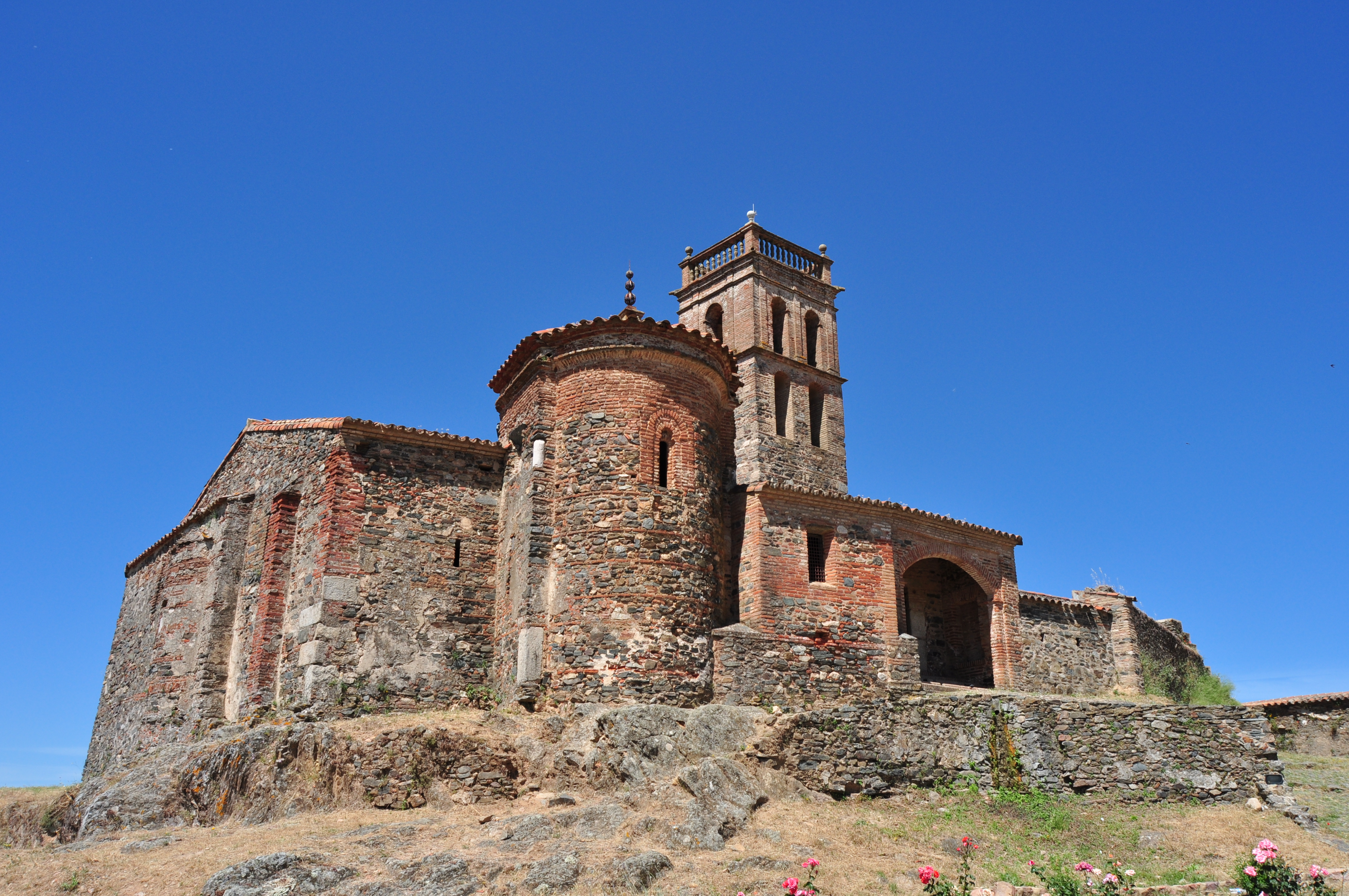
- Property of cultural interest RI-51-0000619 since June 3, 1931

Religion
- Affiliation: Catholic Church

Location
- Location: Almonaster la Real, Spain
- Municipality: Huelva
- Country: Spain
- Interactive map of Almonaster la Real Mosque
- Coordinates: 37°52′13″N 6°47′13″W

Architecture
- Style: Roman, Emirate and caliphal art, Religious art

The Almonaster la Real Mosque (also known as Mezquita de Almonaster in Spanish) is a former Islamic mosque located in this Spanish municipality in the Province of Huelva, Andalusia. It was built during the Caliphate of Córdoba, between the 9th and 10th centuries, inside the castle of Almonaster, on the remains of a Visigothic basilica of the 6th century, whose materials were reused. After the Christian Reconquest, it was converted into a chapel, under the patronage of Our Lady of the Immaculate Conception, and since then it has been the site of Catholic worship.

It is a historical and artistic site of exceptional value, being the only Andalusian mosque that has been preserved almost intact in Spain in a rural area, preserving to this day the sobriety and seclusion typical of these buildings. With Roman, Caliphal and Christian elements, it was declared a National Monument on June 3, 1931, protected generically by the decree of April 22, 1949 and by Law 16/85 on Spanish Historical Heritage. Today it combines its religious function with that of a cultural center.

== Description ==
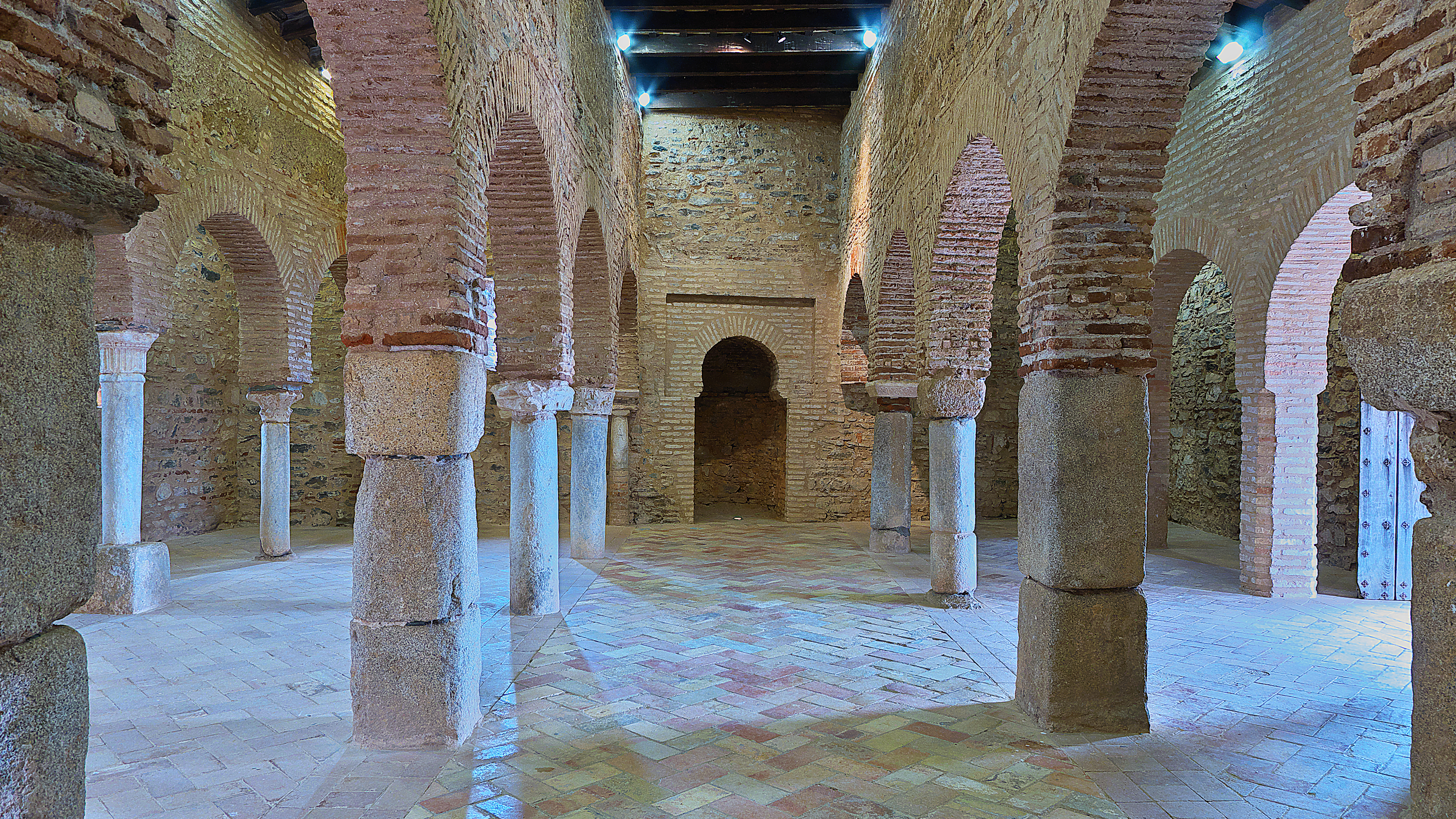
Interior columns

The mosque is built on a hill overlooking the town of Almonaster la Real. It is part of a complex that includes, in addition to the oratory, an old Muslim fortress annexed to a bullring.

It is a trapezoidal construction, a shape that was probably determined by the slope of the land. It is observed in the structure of the temple a classic organization of the places of Islamic worship, distinguishing two separate spaces: The courtyard of ablutions or sahn and the prayer hall or haram, forming a square area of about eleven meters on each side. The prayer hall consists of five naves of unequal width. Its arcades, like those of the Mosque of Córdoba, run transversally to the qibla. The central nave is wider than the next two, which in turn are wider than the outer two. The sections on the south side are wider than the others, resulting in a clear arrangement in the form of a letter "T". The courtyard, in the prolongation of the two western collateral naves, is partly excavated in the rock.

The building is made of brick, granite ashlars and masonry. For its construction, material was used, such as funeral arks, columns and Roman capitals from the 1st and 2nd centuries, as well as Visigothic fragments from the 5th and 6th centuries, such as a tombstone with an epitaph, an iconostasis door, a abacus and a lintel. The arches are made of brick and rest on a series of heteroclite supports. Some are column shafts, others are stone pillars.

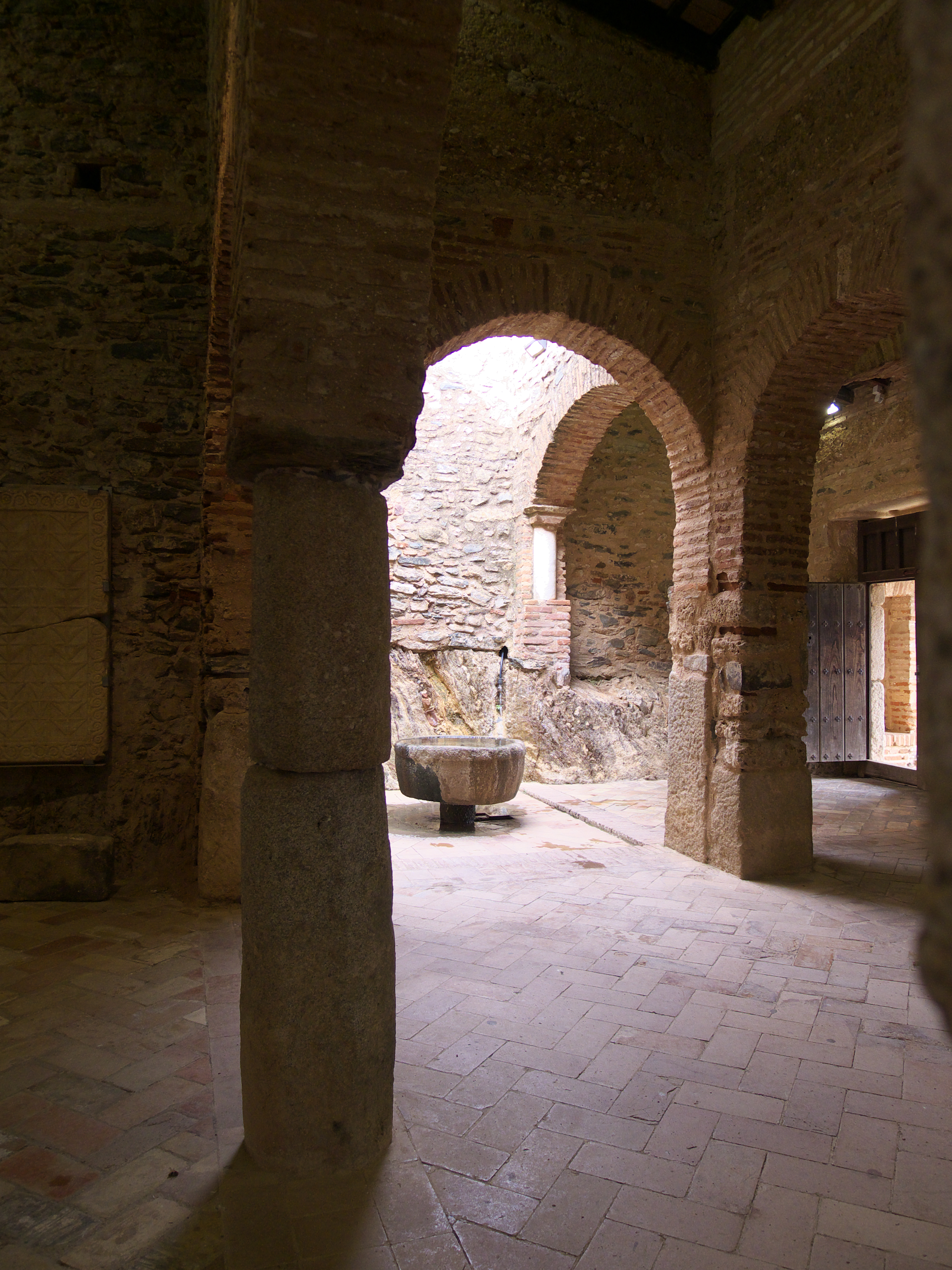
Courtyard of ablutions or sahn

The mihrab is a deep niche made of brick and stone of archaic appearance, which has lost its cladding. To the north, outside the building, west of the mihrab, rises a square minaret. It is probable that the mosque had only one entrance in the first northern section of the central nave. Its scarce light was received from the patio, the door and three narrow windows or loopholes, two of them to the left and right of the mihrab.

In the Christian period an apse was added to the mosque on the east side. Its brick hemispherical dome was built in the first half of the 18th century. It has remains of mural paintings from the same period with vegetal decoration and tondos with the Fathers of the Latin Church. Next to the apse is a sacristy and on the west side a portico. This gave the building a new central axis and, with it, a new liturgical orientation, corresponding to the new religion. The old door and the north side were also rebuilt. Sixteen undated tombs have been discovered in the prayer hall, while a large font is located in the northeast corner.

Art historians point out that the strong archaic and rustic character of the whole building is due either to the fact that the mosque was built in the early 9th century, or to the fact that it is a "provincial version" of the buildings of the period of the caliphs. The hierarchization of the prayer hall seems to support the second assumption.

== History ==
=== Roman and Islamic period ===
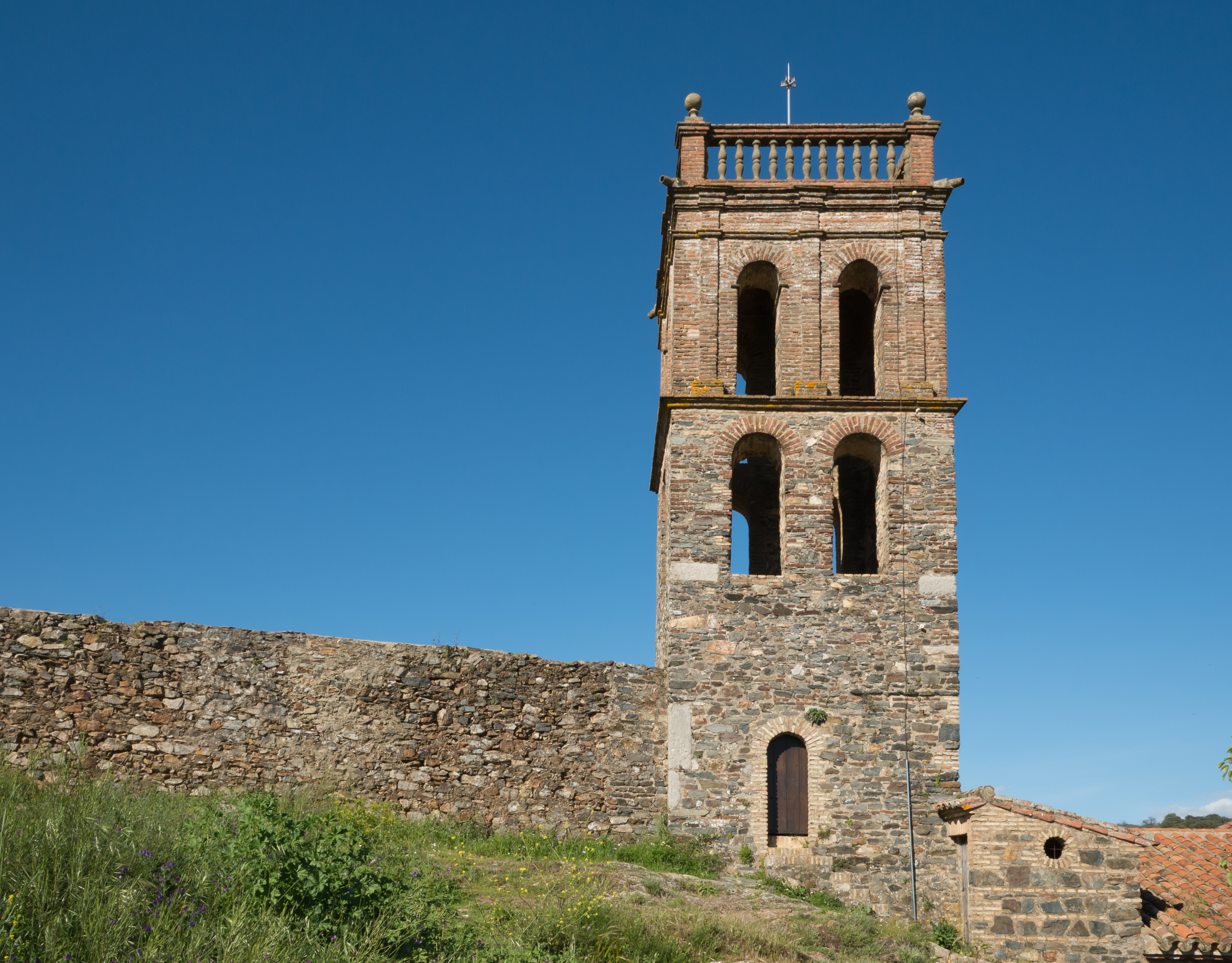
Side of the mosque. Built on a hill, it is an integral part of an important architectural ensemble.

It is considered that the site of the mosque was of great importance for the different peoples and cultures that, throughout history, passed through Almonaster, the present building remaining standing for more than a thousand years, used for religious purposes by Muslims and Christians.

In Roman period it seems that a military enclave existed in the place next to a building of sacred character. In the 6th century it was converted into a Visigothic monastery (hence the place name of the town of Almonaster - Almunnastyr - The monastery) that disappeared with the arrival of the Muslims to the Iberian Peninsula. The area was then conquered by the governor Abd al-Aziz ibn Musa, where Berber settlers, who depended on the Walids of Córdoba, settled. The first written testimony about Almonaster dates from 822, although the existence of the mosque is not mentioned:

... the iqlim of al-Munastyr and the others of the kúra of Seville collected more than 35,000 dinars from the gibáya.

— Abdallah al-Bakri(Lévi-Provençal 1938)

Between the 9th and 10th centuries the mosque was erected on the site, using materials from the pre-existing Roman and Visigothic buildings, both in structure and decoration, especially columns and capitals. The architectural complex and the hamlet were also surrounded by a walled fence. During the Caliphate of Córdoba, until its decomposition, the settlement had importance in the area, which it maintained years later when Almonaster became part of the Taifa Kingdom of Badajoz. With the Almohad invasion this mountainous area struggled to remain independent until it ended up falling in 1111. Judging by the important defensive function of Al-Munastyr, during the last years of the advance of the Christian kingdoms, the human movement around Almonaster and its mosque must have been very important.

=== Christian period and present time ===
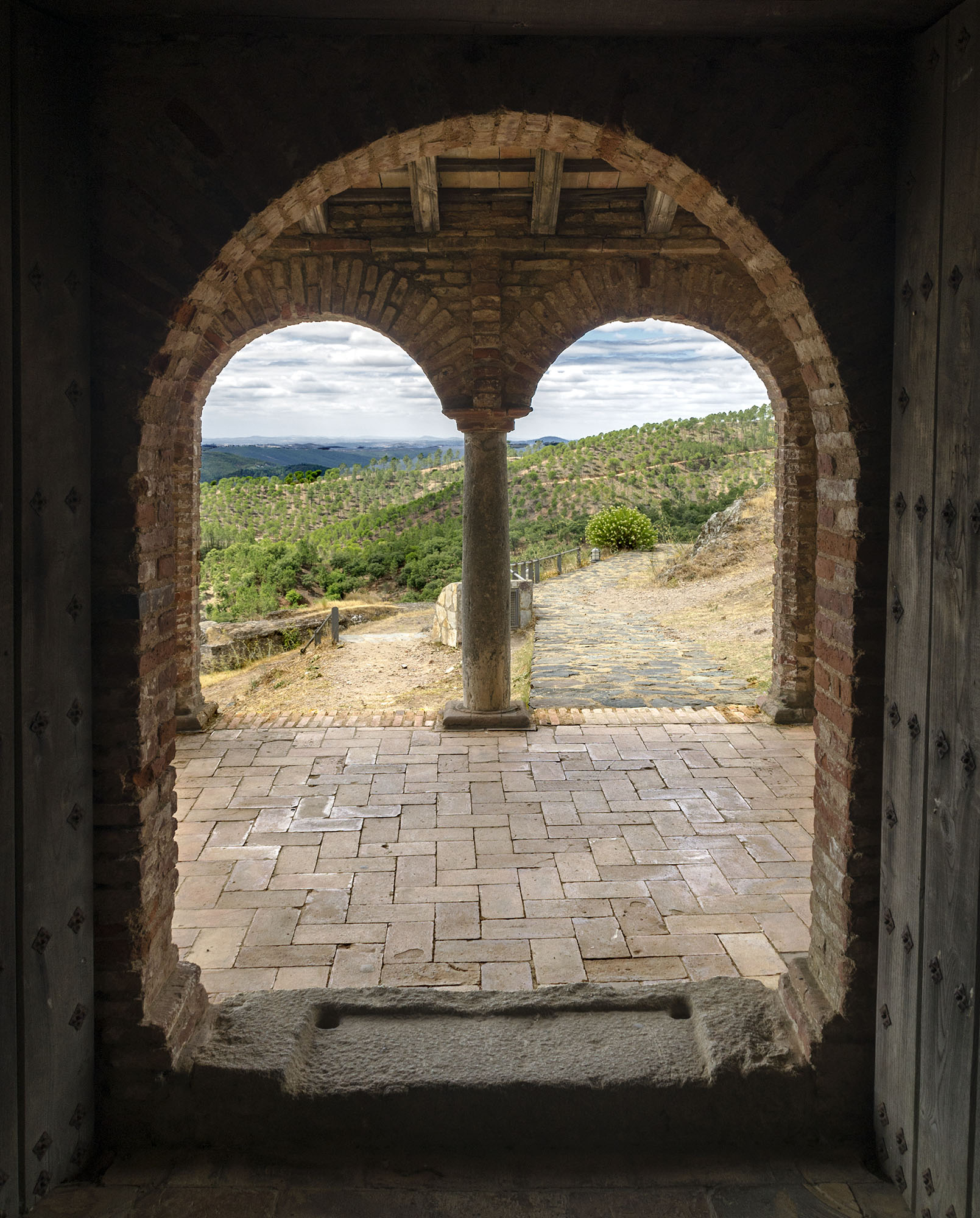
Portico from the Christian period

The Christians reconquered Almonaster in the 13th century, respecting the mosque and converting it into a chapel, making some minor modifications over the following years. In 1230, the Military Order of the hospital, incorporated Almonaster and part of the mountain range to the Kingdom of Portugal, making possible the repopulation of the area. However, it was not until 1253 when Pope Innocent IV, in order to avoid disputes over the Algarve territory, incorporated the area east of the Guadiana to the Crown of Castile, specifically to the Kingdom of Seville, under the ecclesiastical lordship of the Archbishop of Seville.

Throughout the 13th and 14th centuries, practically the entire population lived sheltered behind the walls of the fortress, until the 15th century, when Almonaster ceased to be a defensive plaza. The Archbishopric of Seville stopped paying preferential attention to the temple, leading to a slow deterioration. Documents from 1583 are preserved that give news of the state of the temple, estimating its value at 14,000 ducats and calling the mosque "the old Moorish church". When it became a chapel, the mosque probably took the title of St. Mary, since in the 15th century the temple is already named under the title of Our Lady of the Immaculate Conception.

Today, in addition to being a Catholic church, the building serves as a cultural and interpretation center in the town.

== See also ==
- List of Bienes de Interés Cultural in the Province of Huelva

== Bibliography ==
- Barroso Trujillo, M. A. (2005). Almonaster... Frontera abierta (in Spanish). Ayuntamiento de Almonaster la Real.
- Carriazo Rubio, Juan Luis (2004). Huelva, tierra de castillos (in Spanish) (Excelentísima Diputación Provincial de Huelva ed.). ISBN 84-8163-414-X.
- Several authors (2007). La ruta de los castillos. Sierra de Aracena y Picos de Aroche (in Spanish) (Excelentísima Diputación Provincial de Huelva ed.).
