= Torre de la Higuera =

Monument in Almonte, Spain

Coordinates: 37°00′19″N 6°34′05″W

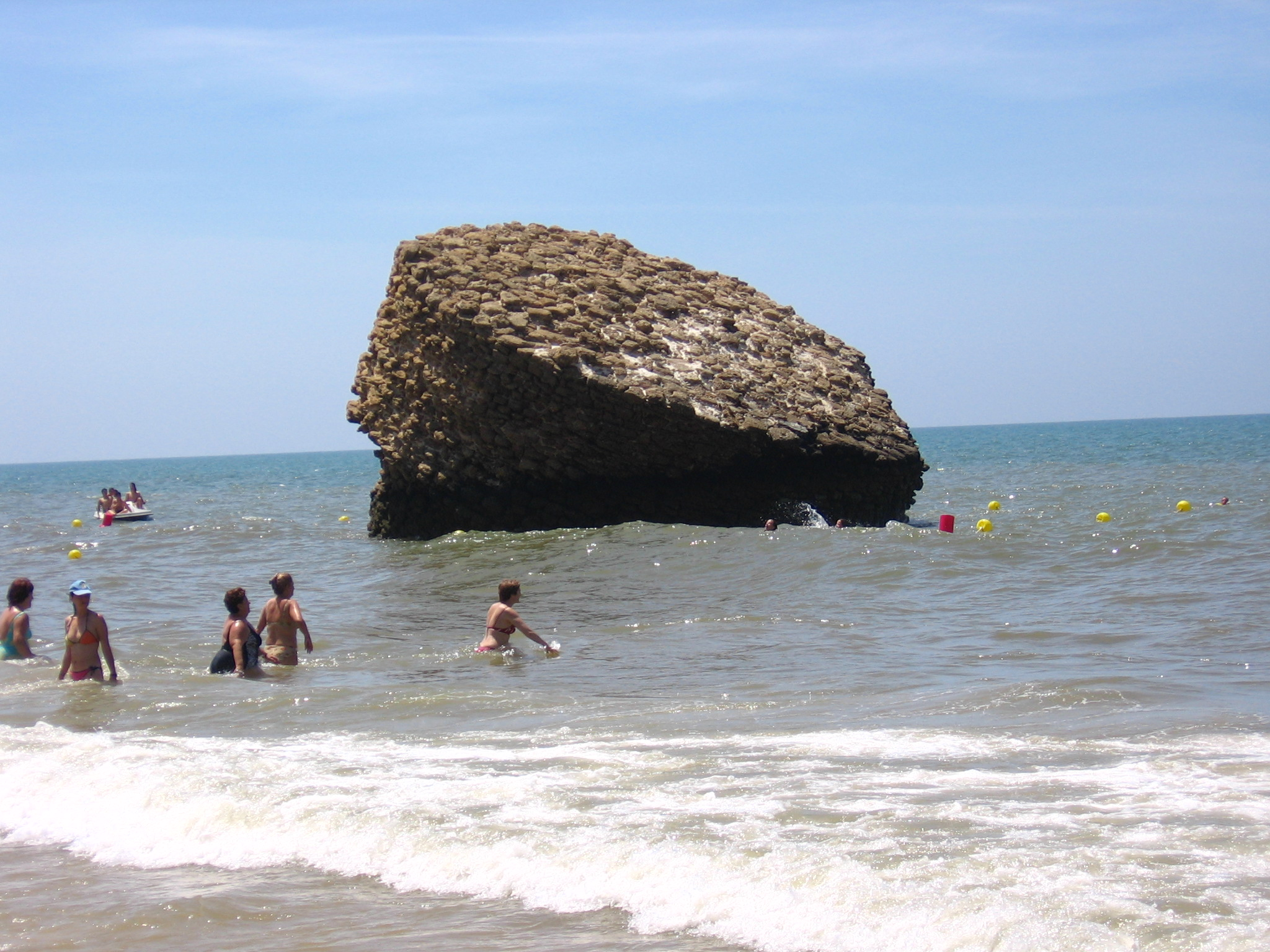
- Interactive map of Torre de la Higuera
- Location: Huelva, Spain
- Type: Watchtower
- Completion date: 1577

The Torre de la Higuera, colloquially known as La Peña, El Tapón or simply as La Piedra de Matalascañas, is a watchtower in ruins, declared a Bien de Interés Cultural, located on Castilla Beach in Matalascañas, in Almonte, Huelva, Spain. It was one of the eleven towers that existed in the province of Huelva, belonging to the system of coastal watchtowers, between the Torre Carbonero and the Torre del Asperillo, which covered much of the Spanish coast, although only its foundations are left overturned on the beach.

== History ==
Its origin dates back to the 16th century, when the beaches of Castile were plundered and attacked by corsairs and Barbary pirates from the North African coasts. For this reason, King Philip II ordered that a series of towers be constructed to defend the Spanish coasts at the end of the 16th century. The project of fortification of the Andalusian Atlantic coast was in the hands of Luis Bravo de Laguna, a royal commissioner. His goal was to protect the area, which ranges from Gibraltar to Ayamonte.

It was ordered to be built in 1577. When this line of watchtowers was projected, the need to build an “ordinary” tower was pointed out. It was to have a single vault or chamber, to constitute a watering point, anchored for coastal shipping from Sanlúcar de Barrameda, and to provide fishermen with a place to stay, all subject to the visits of the Barbary ships.

It has been speculated that the Lisbon earthquake of 1755 is to blame for the tower's current state, when it caused it to tilt from the top of the sandy loam cliff of continental origin where it was originally located, making the foundations fall to the beach. However, some scholars state that it fell due to a storm.

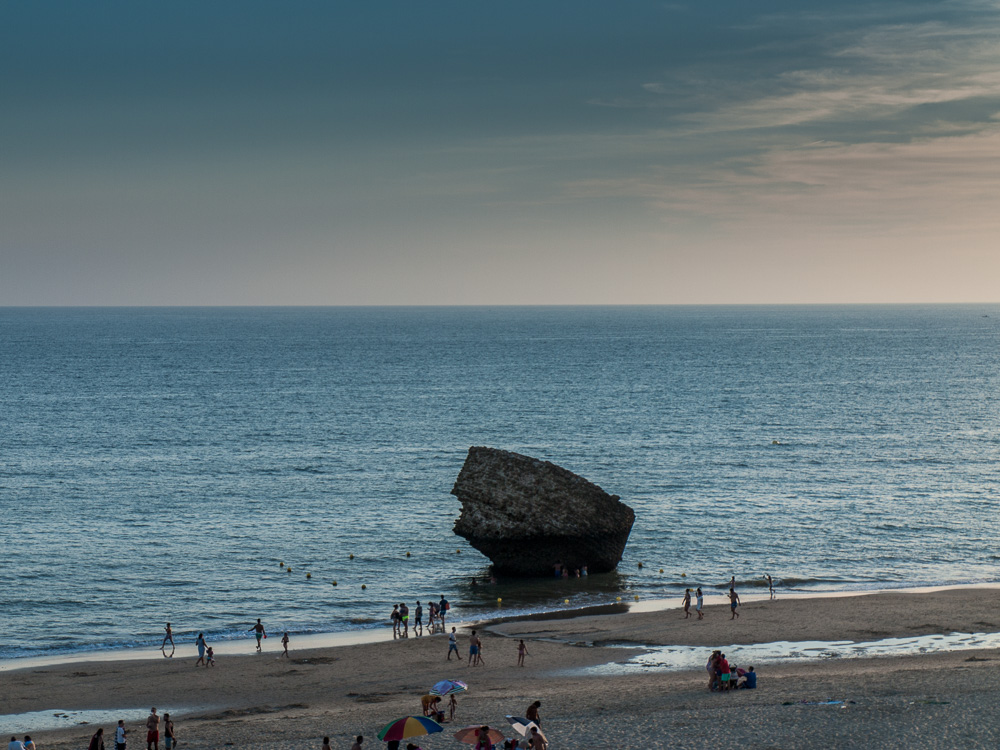
The tower on the beach.

== Description ==
With the appearance of a huge spire laying on the low tide line, the only visible remains of what was once the Torre de la Higuera have been visible for many years. Its strange appearance is due to the fact that, being in a totally inverted position, the widening of the circular plinth and the foundations are shown in the air as a crown, while the walls, which have been broken by the breaking tide, sink into the sand and the water.

This unusual position dates from quite a long time ago and has not substantially altered its state of preservation at least so far this century, thus evidencing the exceptional quality of the mortar used and of the work in general, which is resisting wear and tear while sitting in a forced position for which it was not conceived.

== Current condition ==
Currently, only the foundations of the tower are preserved, which are overturned on the shore and in an inverted position. The tower offers the visitor a rare view of its foundations, which are in a poor state of conservation as a result of the passage of time and the action of the sea. Today, it is under the protection of the generic declaration of the Decree of April 22, 1949, and the Law 16/1985 on the Spanish Historical Heritage, which declared it an Asset of Cultural Interest.

The indiscriminate use of the tower as a foothold for jumping into the water, with the dangers that this entails, has led the authorities to prohibit this practice.
