= Sagunto Roman theatre =

Teatro romano de Sagunt
- Teatro romano de Sagunt (Spanish)
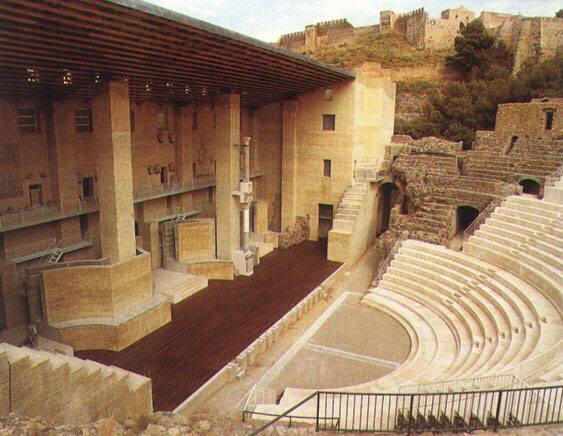

- Location within Spain
- 39.676811°N 0.277925°W
- Location: Sagunt, Spain

Spanish Cultural Heritage
- Official name: Teatro romano
- Type: Non-movable
- Criteria: Monument
- Designated: 1896
- Reference no.: RI-51-0000073

The Teatro romano de Sagunto (Spanish: Teatre romano) is a Roman theatre located in Sagunto, Spain. It was declared Bien de Interés Cultural in 1896. The Roman Theatre of Sagunto is located at the foot of the mountain, crowned by Sagunto Castle. It occupies the intermediate terrace, between the city and the upper platform chaired by the Forum, Civic Center of the municipality, responding to an urban planning of the times of Emperor Augustus. It was built in the middle of the first century, using the slope of the mountain. It consists of two distinct parts: the cavea or grandstands, semicircular and composed by three orders of stands and the frons scaenae, which rises to the height of the top of the grandstands porch. It is semicircular in shape and can seat 8,000 spectators.

== See also ==
- List of Bien de Interés Cultural in the Province of Valencia
- List of Roman theatres
