= List of Bienes de Interés Cultural in the Province of Castellón =

This is a list of Bien de Interés Cultural landmarks in the Province of Castellón, Spain.

== List ==
- Carabona Tower
- Castillo o Torre
- El Fadrí
- Peniscola Castle
- Segorbe Cathedral
