= List of Bienes de Interés Cultural in the Province of Santa Cruz de Tenerife =

This is an incomplete list of Bien de Interés Cultural landmarks in the Province of Santa Cruz de Tenerife, Spain.

== List ==
The list is according to:

- Basilica of Candelaria
- Casa Anchieta
- Castillo de Santa Catalina (La Palma)
- Castle of San Andrés
- Castle of St John the Baptist
- Cave of Chinguaro
- Caves of Don Gaspar
- Guía de Isora
- Icod de los Vinos
- Iglesia de la Concepción (San Cristóbal de La Laguna)
- Iglesia de la Concepción (Santa Cruz de Tenerife)
- Iglesia de San Francisco de Asís (Santa Cruz de Tenerife)
- Iglesia de Santo Domingo de Guzmán (San Cristóbal de La Laguna)
- La Laguna Cathedral
- Lago Martiánez
- Los Silos
- Masonic Temple of Santa Cruz de Tenerife
- Museo Municipal de Bellas Artes de Santa Cruz de Tenerife
- Museo de la Naturaleza y Arqueología
- Old road of Candelaria
- Parroquia Matriz del Apóstol Santiago
- Shrine of Our Lady of Mount Carmel (Los Realejos)
- Teatro Guimerá
- Gofio Mill of Risco de las Pencas
- Mills and washhouses in Chacaica
- Historic Site of Lo de Ramos
- La Gallega Archaeological Zone
- Hermitage of Our Lady of Bonanza
- Festival of the Hearts of Tejina
