= List of Bienes de Interés Cultural in the Region of Murcia =

This is a list of Bien de Interés Cultural landmarks in the Province of Murcia, Spain.

- Despeñaperros Castle
- IES Licenciado Francisco Cascales
- Murcia Cathedral
- Sanctuary of Our Lady of Fuensanta
