= Castillo de Santa Catalina (La Palma) =

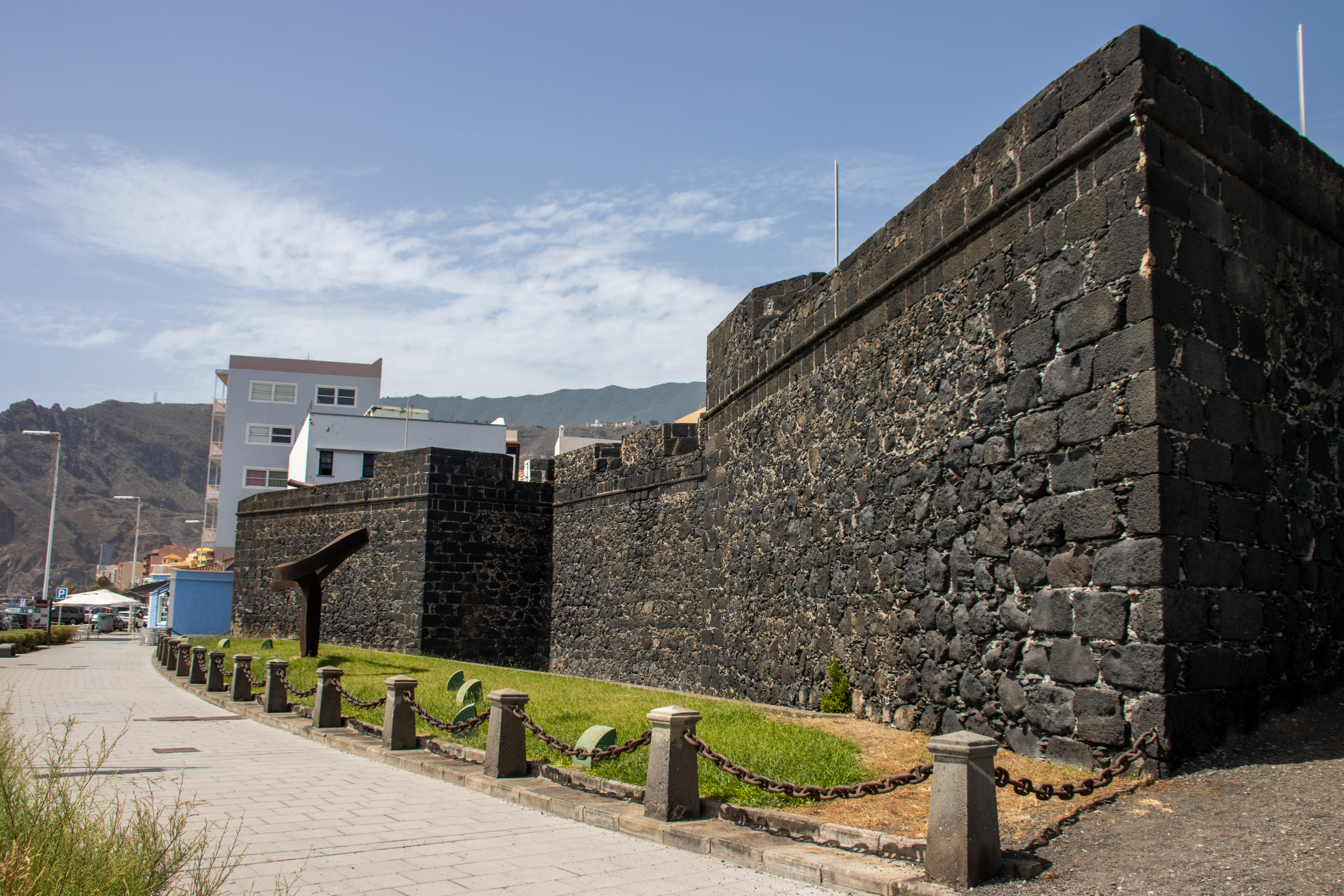

- Location within Canary Islands

General information
- Type: castle
- Location: Santa Cruz de La Palma, Canary Islands
- Coordinates: 28°41′13″N 17°45′38″W

Design and construction
- Designations: Bien de Interés Cultural (1951)

The Castillo de Santa Catalina is a castle in Santa Cruz de La Palma on the island of La Palma in the Canary Islands. The original castle was constructed in 1554–1560 after the city was attacked by French pirates in 1553. The current castle was constructed between 1685 and 1692 and was recorded as a historical monument in 1951. It has been privately owned since 1949 and is open to the public.

== First castle ==
French pirates attacked Santa Cruz de La Palma on 21 July 1553, after which the town constructed a series of fortifications. Construction of the first Santa Catalina castle was started in 1554, and became operational in September 1560.

It consisted of an elliptical platform and circular tower. The layout was redesigned by Leonardo Torriani in 1585. The castle was decaying by the mid-1660s due to the sea and storms causing the nearby Barranco de Las Nieves to overflow (such as one on 14 January 1671). It was in ruins between around 1666–1681, after which it was demolished.

== Second castle ==
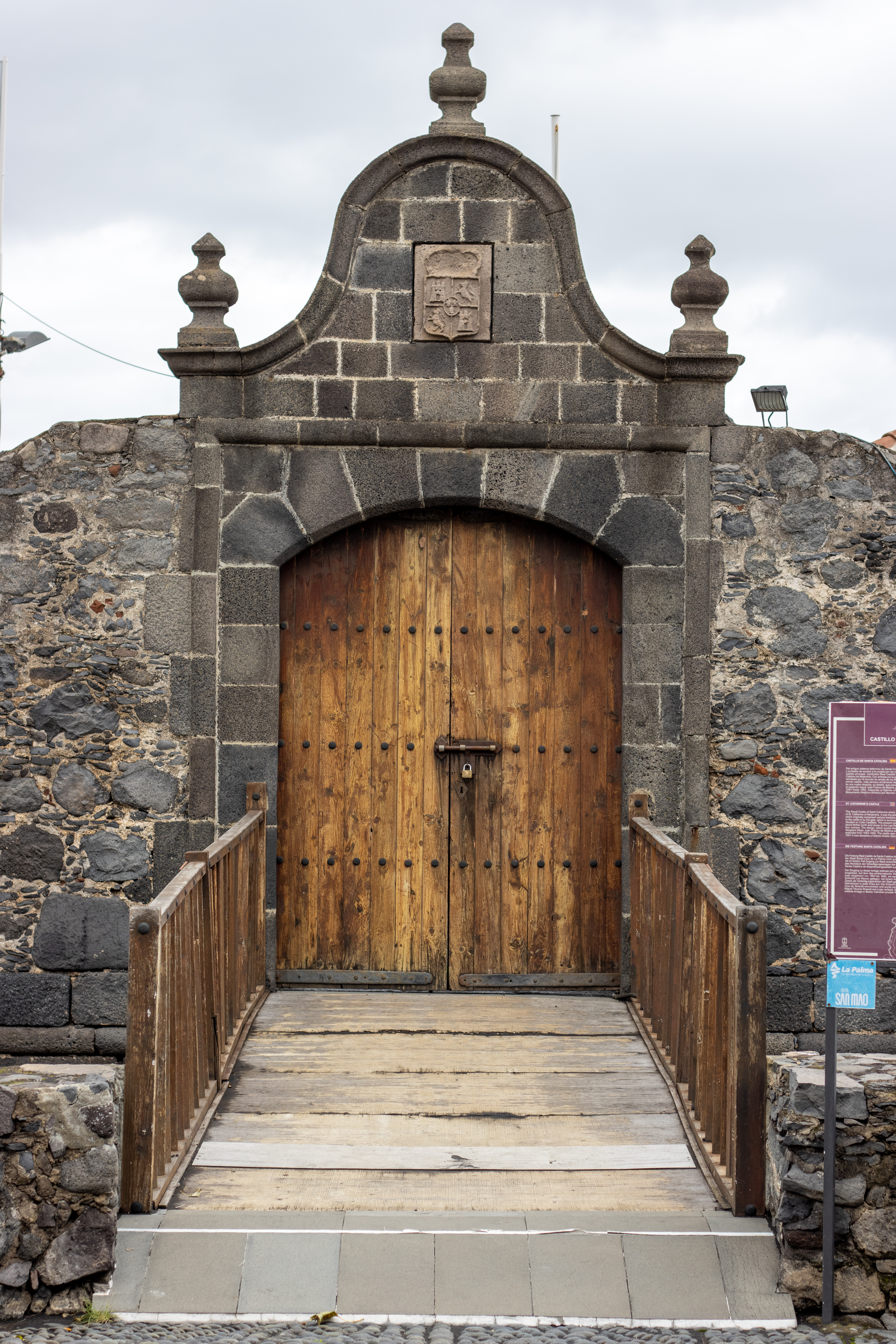
The entrance to the castle

The current castle was constructed in 1685 to 1692, and is located immediately behind the position of the previous castle, on land obtained in November 1683. Initial funding of 30,000 silver reales to construct the castle was by public subscription, with the remainder from the island's government in 1686.

The castle is of the style of 16th-century Italian military Renaissance. It is quadrangular, with triangle bastions on the corners, and a wide embankment and moat crossed by a wooden bridge. The entrance portal, now on calle Castillete, bears the coat of arms of the Catholic Monarchs of Spain. It has a weapons room, powder magazine, and dungeons, as well as a warehouse. The castle also contains a house for the governor and garrison. It was used as a garrison and prison. One notable prisoner was the lawyer Anselmo Pérez de Brito.

It was the main castle of the fortifications for the city. The layout is similar to that of the now-demolished Castle of San Cristóbal in Tenerife i.e. square with a rampart at each corner.

== Preservation ==
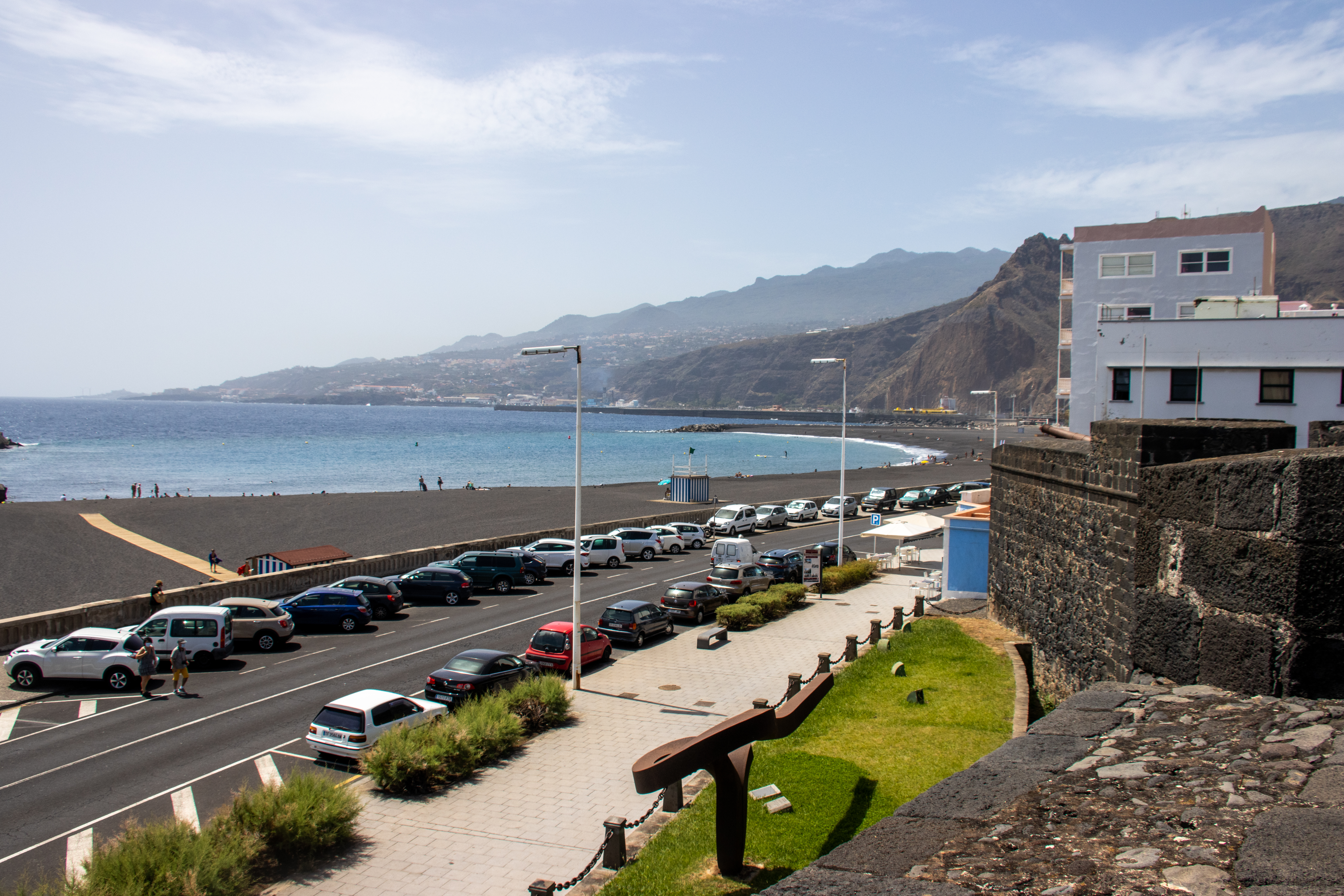
The view from the castle towards the port area

The castle had a permanent guard until 1808. An inventory of the castle was made in 1883. In 1924 it was declared unsuitable for military purposes and the army decided to sell it. The auction took place on 17 February 1949, when it was sold to a group of merchants represented by Manuel Rodríguez Acosta for 300,000 pesetas. Their plan was to demolish it and construct houses on the site. The demolition was prevented by a decree for the preservation of Spanish castles by the Spanish government on 22 April 1949.

It was recorded as a Historic Monument on 22 June 1951 in the Boletín Oficial del Estado and was added to the Spanish Historical Heritage list by Law 16/1985. It is the only preserved Habsburg-era fortification in the Canary Islands.

An agreement between the city council and the private owners means that it has been open for tourists since May 2015, except for a period at the start of 2020.

In front of the castle is a sculpture of trade winds by Martín Chirino. Named 'El Alisio', it was installed in 1999, and restored in 2014–2016.
