= List of Bienes de Interés Cultural in the Province of Huesca =

List of Bien de Interés Cultural landmarks in the Province of Huesca, Aragon, northeastern Spain.

== List ==
- Casbas Monastery
- Jaca Cathedral
