= List of Bienes de Interés Cultural in the Province of Lleida =

This is a list of Bien de Interés Cultural landmarks in the Province of Lleida, Catalonia, Spain.

- Old Cathedral of Lleida
