= List of Bienes de Interés Cultural in the Province of Valencia =

This is a list of Bien de Interés Cultural landmarks in the Province of Valencia, Spain.

- Convent of Santo Domingo
- Sagunto Roman theatre
