= List of Bienes de Interés Cultural in the Province of Huelva =

This is a list of Bien de Interés Cultural landmarks in the Province of Huelva, Spain.

== List ==
- Castillo de Almonaster la Real
- Castillo de Moguer
- Iglesia de San Martín
- Ermita de Santa Eulalia y su entorno "La Arguijuela"
- Torre de la Higuera
- Torre de la Carbonera
- Monument to the Discoverers (Palos de la Frontera)
