= List of Bienes de Interés Cultural in the Province of León =

This is a list of Bien de Interés Cultural landmarks in the Province of León, Spain.

== List ==
- Church of Grisuela del Páramo
- Monastery of Carracedo
- Monastery of San Miguel de Escalada
- León Cathedral
