= Fornells, Menorca =

Village in Menorca, Spain

Coordinates: 40°03′20″N 4°07′50″E

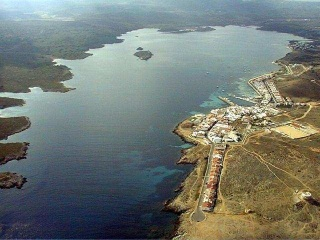
Bay of Fornells

Fornells is a village located in a bay in the north of the Balearic island of Menorca, Spain. Fornells is estimated to have a population of about 1000 people, which increases in the summer due to tourism. Fornells' native people are known as Fornellers in the Catalan language and in Spanish.

== History ==
The village was founded to serve a small defensive watch tower, built at the beginning of the 17th century as a defence against the Barbary pirates for whom Fornells Bay provided the perfect safe haven. This watch tower proved to be insufficient, so in 1625 King Phillip IV of Spain ordered a castle to be added. This project initially failed due to lack of funds, but was recommenced in 1637 as the Castle of Sant Antoni. During construction, a small village was formed around the castle, occupied by construction workers and soldiers, this village becoming the basis of modern-day Fornells. During the 18th century, the castle was held alternately by the British and French, before returning to Spanish dominion in 1782. King Charles III of Spain then ordered the partial destruction of the castle, but the small village around the castle remained. The military past of Fornells is still remembered in the British watch tower on the headland, outside the village.

In 1798 the village was a landing site during the Capture of Menorca by the British.

== Location ==
Fornells Bay is deep, measuring 5 kilometres long and 2 kilometres wide. The narrow entrance regulates the force of the open sea, allowing water to enter the bay while restricting the waves. However, the wind is not so easily restrained: the surrounding hills are not high enough to keep out the Tramontane (Tramontana in Catalan), which has shaped the rocks and bent the trees over until the branches almost touch the ground.

From Fornells, Cavallería Cape can be seen to the west, and the massive bulk of La Mola, forming the eastern side of the entrance to the bay, to the east.

== Fishing village ==
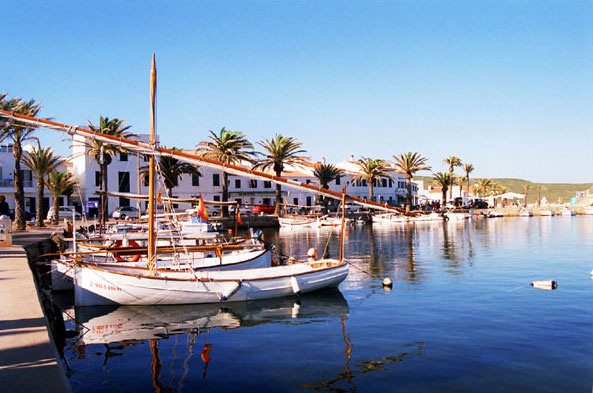
Fornells fishing village, Menorca (Menorca)

Fornells' natural harbour is filled with llauts, the traditional Menorcan fishing craft used for fishing lobsters.

== Tourist activities ==
Having several small beaches around the bay, the harbour offers a number of aquatic activities for tourists, including boat trips, catamaran excursions, kayaking and windsurfing.

The annual fiesta de Sant Antoni is held on the fourth weekend in July.
