= List of Bienes de Interés Cultural in Ceuta =

This is a list of Bien de Interés Cultural landmarks in Ceuta, Spain.

- Royal Walls of Ceuta
