= Na Nova =

Coordinates: 39.3204°N 3.1240°E

Na Nova talaiotic settlement
- Poblat talaiòtic de na Nova
- Son Amer / Talaia d'en Cama
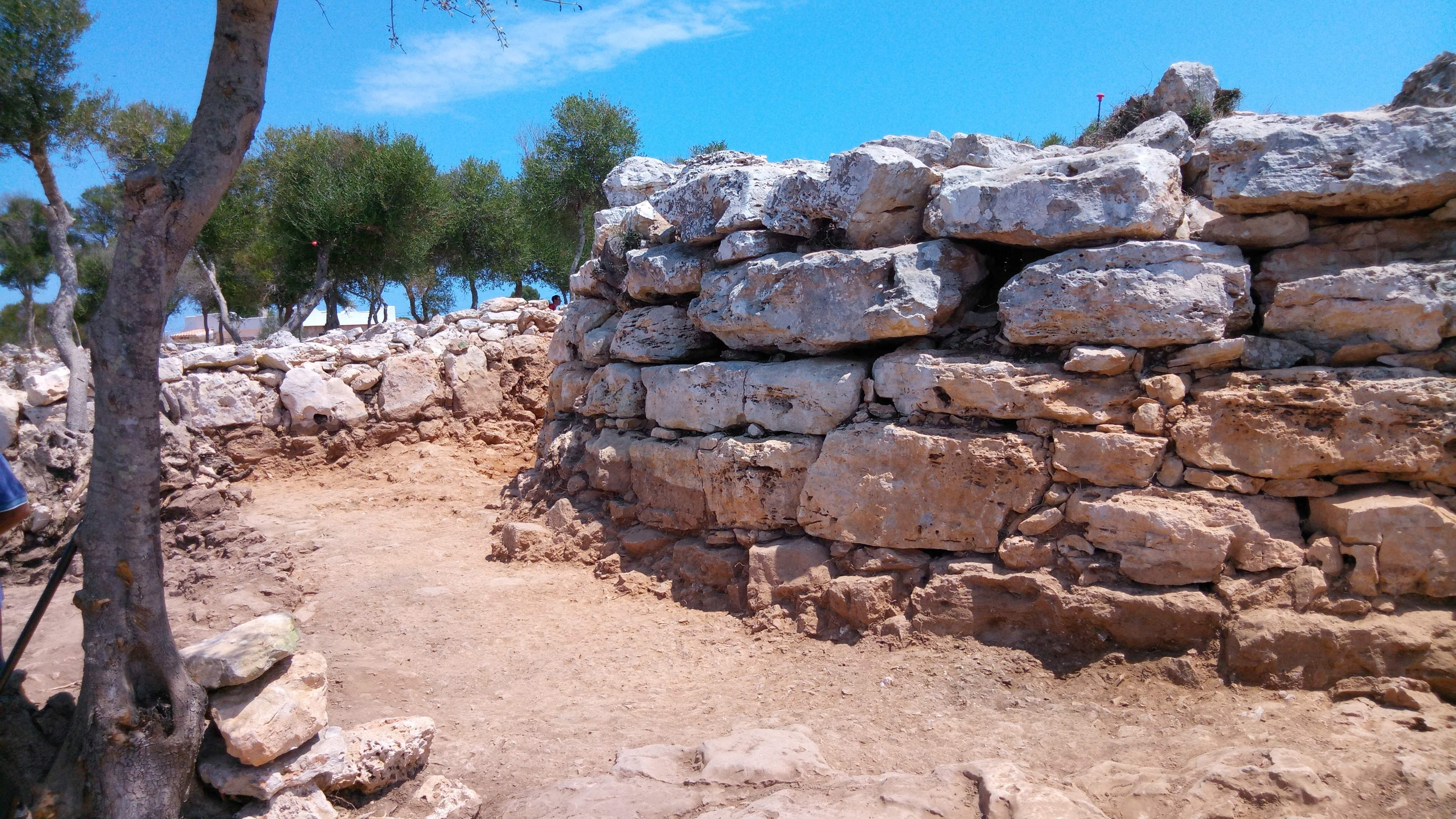
- Interactive map of Na Nova talaiotic settlement
- Periods: Iron Age
- Cultures: Talaiotic culture

Site notes
- Elevation: 50 m (160 ft)
- Excavation dates: 2019-2020
- Owner: Particular
- Public access: Free

Na Nova (known also by other names, Son Amer and Talaia d'en Cama) is a Spanish Iron Age Talaiotic settlement located on the island of Mallorca, near the resort of Cala Llombards. Although its entirety is highly altered, it has been designated a Bien de Interés Cultural. Its most characteristic structure is the talaiot, a tower-shaped megalithic structure which is in good conditions.

The talaiot's diameter is 12 metres (39 ft) on the outside and 6 metres (20 ft) on the inside. It is more than 2 metres (6 ft 7 in) high and it preserves five courses of huge stones in its best preserved parts. The inside is full of rubblestones, but the polylithic column still stands, as does the entrance with its stone lintel. The rest of the structures are partially razed and covered with more rubble, and have not been satisfactorily identified.

The site was densely and totally covered with bushes and trees until its first cleaning in 2016 and 2017. Then the structures became visible, and the first excavation began, which consisted mainly in removing the rubble to leave structures visible. After the 2020 campaign, the north face was totally uncovered and the south one partially revealed; its eastern face supports an ancient wall, while its western face supports a modern one (19th century).
