= List of Bienes de Interés Cultural in the Province of Segovia =

This is a list of Bien de Interés Cultural landmarks in the Province of Segovia, Spain.

- Cuéllar Castle
- Aqueduct of Segovia
- Alcázar (fortress) of Segovia
- Tower of San Esteban
- Royal Palace of La Granja de San Ildefonso
- Cathedral of Segovia
