= List of Bienes de Interés Cultural in the Province of Cáceres =

This is a list of Bien de Interés Cultural landmarks in the Province of Cáceres, Spain.

== List ==
- Iglesia Parroquial de Santiago
- Iglesia de San Juan Bautista
- Casa de las Veletas
- Old Cathedral of Plasencia
- Palacio de la Conquista
