= List of Bienes de Interés Cultural in the Province of Lugo =

This is an incomplete list of Bien de Interés Cultural landmarks in the Province of Lugo, Spain.

- Basilica of San Martiño de Mondoñedo
- Castrodouro Castle
- Church of San Xoán, Portomarín
- Lugo Cathedral
- Monastery of Santa María de Meira
- Monastery of San Xulián de Samos
- Mondoñedo Cathedral
- Roman walls of Lugo
- Serra dos Ancares
