= List of Bienes de Interés Cultural in the Province of Ciudad Real =

This is a list of Bien de Interés Cultural landmarks in the Province of Ciudad Real, Spain.

== List ==
- Iglesia de San Francisco, Alcázar de San Juan
- Iglesia de Santa Quiteria
- Iglesia Parroquial de Santa María la Mayor
- Torreón del Gran Príor
- Iglesia de Nuestra Señora de la Asunción, Valdepeñas
- Iglesia del Santo Cristo de la Misericordia, Valdepeñas
- Ermita de la Veracruz Valdepeñas
- Yacimiento Arqueológico Cerro de las Cabezas, Valdepeñas
