= List of Bienes de Interés Cultural in the Province of Ourense =

This is an incomplete list of Bien de Interés Cultural landmarks in the Province of Ourense, Spain.

- As Burgas
- Monastery of San Salvador de Celanova
- Monastery of Santa María de Oseira
- Ourense Cathedral
- Ponte Vella
- Ribadavia
