= List of Bienes de Interés Cultural in Biscay =

This is a list of Bien de Interés Cultural landmarks in the province of Biscay, Spain.

== Historic groups ==
Bien de interés cultural
Name of monument	BIC type	Type	Coordinates	BIC#	Date	Image
Way of St. James	Historic group	CH	-	RI-53-0000035-00017	9 May 1962	
Vizcaya Bridge	Monument	Ferry Bridge	43.323175°N 3.016833°W	RI-51-0005782	17 July 1984	
Torre de Cursavell	Monument	Civil architecture	42.312698°N 2.664734°E	RI-51-0005783	8 November 1988	n/a

== Bien by municipality ==
=== A ===
Abadiano

Bien de interés cultural in Abadiano
Name of monument	BIC type	Type	Coordinates	BIC#	Date	Image
Torre de Muntsaratz	Monument	Defense architecture	43.144828°N 2.600725°W	RI-51-0005158	17 July 1984	

=== B ===
Balmaseda

Bien de interés cultural in Balmaseda
Name of monument	BIC type	Type	Coordinates	BIC#	Date	Image
Iglesia de San Severino	Monument	Religious architecture	43.196166°N 3.192629°W	RI-51-0005146	17 July 1984	
Puente Viejo	Monument	Civil architecture Bridge	43.192717°N 3.195339°W	RI-51-0005156	17 July 1984	

Bermeo

Bien de interés cultural in Bermeo
Name of monument	BIC type	Type	Coordinates	BIC#	Date	Image
Iglesia de Santa María	Monument	Religious architecture	43.420374°N 2.722609°W	RI-51-0005149	17 July 1984	
Claustro de San Francisco	Monument	Religious architecture	43.418909°N 2.725115°W	RI-51-0005153	17 July 1984	
Torre de Ercilla	Monument	Defense architecture	43.420348°N 2.72116°W	RI-51-0001139	27 September 1943	

Bilbao

Bien de interés cultural in Bilbao
Name of monument	BIC type	Type	Coordinates	BIC#	Date	Image
Alhóndiga Bilbao	Monument	Civil architecture	43.259722°N 2.936944°W	RI-51-0002364	22 December 1998	
Church of San Antón	Monument	Religious architecture	43.255°N 2.923333°W	RI-51-0005150	17 July 1984	
Plaza Nueva	Monument	Civil architecture	43.259065°N 2.922686°W	RI-51-0005154	17 July 1984	
Escritorio Mercantil de Bilbao	Monument	Civil architecture	43.259003°N 2.925663°W	RI-51-0005417	15 December 1989	
Casa Arróspide	Monument	Civil architecture	43.259499°N 2.940501°W	RI-51-0006886	23 June 1989	
Casa Montero	Monument	Civil architecture	43.263935°N 2.934788°W	RI-51-0008306	6 July 1993	
Archivo Histórico Provincial (Bilbao)	Archives	Provincial archives	43.264294°N 2.930195°W	RI-AR-0000053	10 November 1997	
Casco Viejo	Historic group	Historic group	43.257549°N 2.923663°W	RI-53-0000144	9 November 1972	
St. James' Cathedral, Bilbao	Monument	Religious architecture	43.256944°N 2.923889°W	RI-51-0001010	3 June 1931	
Archaeological and Ethnological Museum	Monument	Museum	43.257778°N 2.921944°W	RI-51-0001423	1 March 1962	
Bilbao Fine Arts Museum	Monument	Museum	43.265278°N 2.938056°W	RI-51-0001424	1 March 1962	
Casas de Sota	Monument	Civil architecture	43.263134°N 2.93663°W	RI-51-0004249	10 June 1977	

=== D ===
Durango, Biscay

Bien de interés cultural in Durango
Name of monument	BIC type	Type	Coordinates	BIC#	Date	Image
Kurutziaga Cross	Monument	Cross	43.16815°N 2.629269°W	RI-51-0001245	5 February 1954	
Iglesia de Santa María de Uribarri	Monument	Religious architecture	43.167963°N 2.631298°W	RI-51-0001629	3 December 1964	

=== E ===
Elorrio

Bien de interés cultural in Elorrio
Name of monument	BIC type	Type	Coordinates	BIC#	Date	Image
Arguiñeta cemetery	Archaeological zone	Necropolis	43.139904°N 2.535971°W	RI-55-0000054	3 June 1931	
Conjunto Histórico de la Villa de Elorrio	Historic group	CH	43.130657°N 2.542714°W	RI-53-0000049	27 July 1964	
Tola de Gaytan palace	Monument	Civil architecture	43.129313°N 2.538593°W	RI-51-0004375	20 July 1979	n/a
Zearsolo palace	Monument	Civil architecture	43.129949°N 2.541914°W	RI-51-0004436	7 November 1980	

Ermua

Bien de interés cultural in Ermua
Name of monument	BIC type	Type	Coordinates	BIC#	Date	Image
Valdespina palace	Monument	Civil architecture	43.185941°N 2.502177°W	RI-51-0005159	17 July 1984	

=== G ===
Galdames

Bien de interés cultural in Galdames
Name of monument	BIC type	Type	Coordinates	BIC#	Date	Image
Arenaza cave	Monument	Monument	43.258983°N 3.099508°W	RI-51-0005164	17 July 1984	

Galdakao

Bien de interés cultural in Galdakao
Name of monument	BIC type	Type	Coordinates	BIC#	Date	Image
Iglesia de Santa María	Monument	Religious architecture Gothic	43.236387°N 2.832715°W	RI-51-0001012	3 June 1931	

Güeñes

Bien de interés cultural in Güeñes
Name of monument	BIC type	Type	Coordinates	BIC#	Date	Image
Iglesia de Santa María	Monument	Religious architecture	43.213023°N 3.095608°W	RI-51-0005147	17 July 1984	

Guernica

Bien de interés cultural in Guernica
Name of monument	BIC type	Type	Coordinates	BIC#	Date	Image
Basando cave	Monument	Cave	43.346667°N 2.636667°W	RI-51-0000273	25 April 1924	n/a
Casa de Juntas	Monument	Civil architecture	43.313139°N 2.679806°W	RI-51-0005155	17 July 1984	

=== I ===
Ispaster

Bien de interés cultural
Name of monument	BIC type	Type	Coordinates	BIC#	Date	Image
Adán de Yarza palace	Monument	Civil architecture	43.357517°N 2.503274°W	RI-51-0005160	17 July 1984	

=== K ===
Kortezubi

Bien de interés cultural in Kortezubi
Name of monument	BIC type	Type	Coordinates	BIC#	Date	Image
Santimamiñe Cave	Monument	Paleolithic art	43.346667°N 2.636667°W	RI-51-0005165	17 July 1984	

=== L ===
Lekeitio

Bien de interés cultural in Lekeitio
Name of monument	BIC type	Type	Coordinates	BIC#	Date	Image
Iglesia de Santa María	Monument	Religious architecture	43.363333°N 2.502778°W	RI-51-0001011	3 June 1931	
Uriarte Palace	Monument	Civil architecture 17th century Baroque	43.362614°N 2.504235°W	RI-51-0005161	17 July 1984	

=== M ===
Markina-Xemein

Bien de interés cultural in Markina-Xemein
Name of monument	BIC type	Type	Coordinates	BIC#	Date	Image
Iglesia de Santa María	Monument	Religious architecture	43.267363°N 2.493018°W	RI-51-0005151	17 July 1984	
Markina-Xemein cemetery	Monument	Cemetery	43.26762°N 2.492916°W	RI-51-0005152	17 July 1984n/a	

Muskiz

Bien de interés cultural in Muskiz
Name of monument	BIC type	Type	Coordinates	BIC#	Date	Image
Ferrería de El Pobal	Monument	Monument	43.296788°N 3.125681°W	RI-51-0005162	17 July 1984	
Ruins of the Castle, Palace and Hermitage	Monument	Historic group	43.325123°N 3.109218°W	RI-51-0001165	29 September 1944	

=== O ===
Otxandio

Bien de interés cultural in Otxandio
Name of monument	BIC type	Type	Coordinates	BIC#	Date	Image
Casa Consistorial	Monument	Civil architecture	43.040418°N 2.654776°W	RI-51-0001453	7 June 1963	

Orozko

Bien de interés cultural in Orozko
Name of monument	BIC type	Type	Coordinates	BIC#	Date	Image
Torre de Aranguren	Monument	Defense architecture	43.096888°N 2.869361°W	RI-51-0005157	17 July 1984	n/a

=== P ===
Portugalete

Bien de interés cultural in Portugalete
Name of monument	BIC type	Type	Coordinates	BIC#	Date	Image
Iglesia de Santa María	Monument	Religious architecture	43.319722°N 3.016667°W	RI-51-0005148	17 July 1984	

=== Z ===
Ziortza-Bolibar

Bien de interés cultural in Ziortza-Bolibar
Name of monument	BIC type	Type	Coordinates	BIC#	Date	Image
Colegiata de Zenarruza	Monument	Civil architecture	43.24836°N 2.562488°W	RI-51-0001214	13 August 1948	
