= Despeñaperros Castle =

Castle in Spain

Coordinates: 37.6026°N 0.9785°W

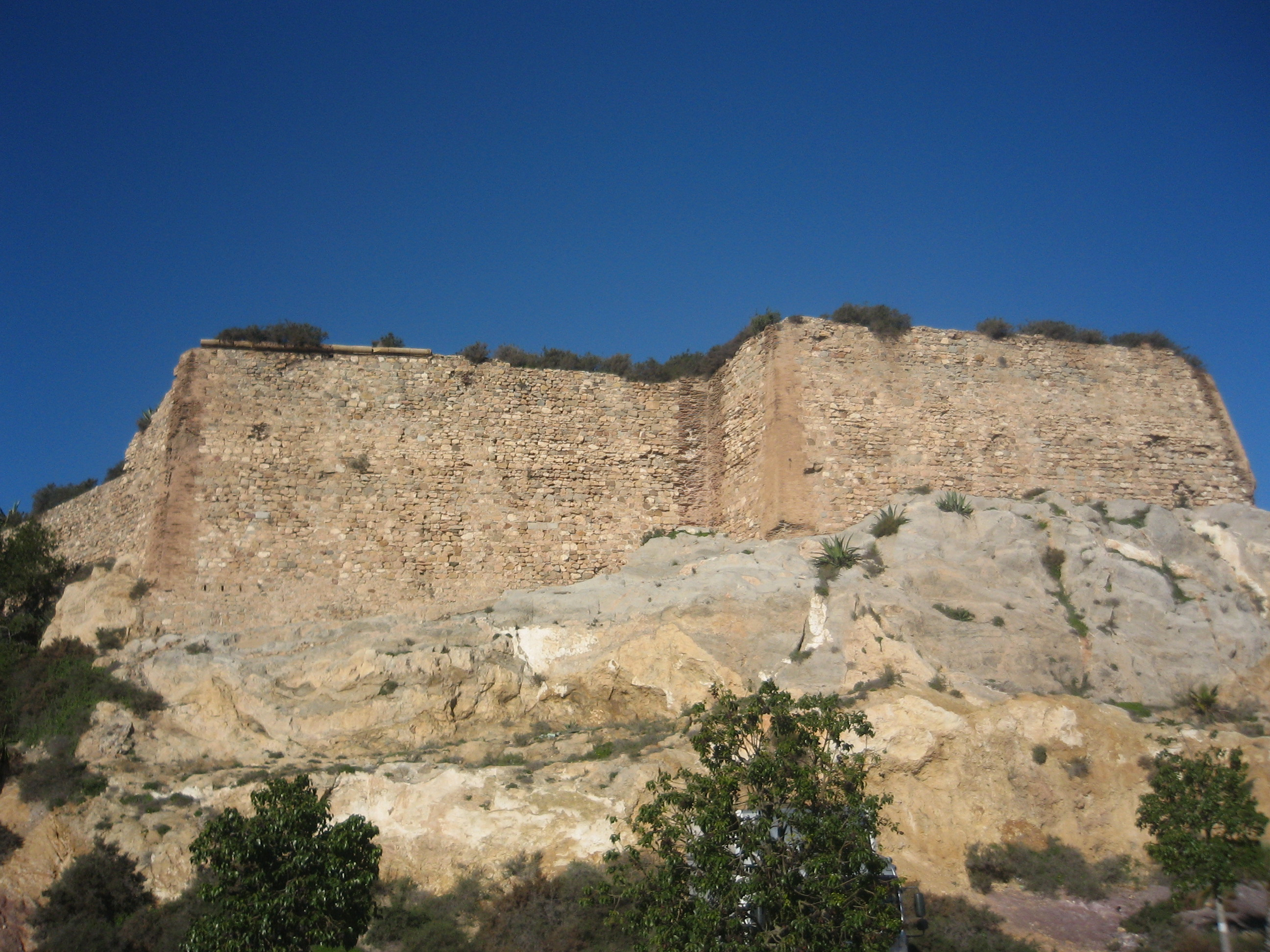

Despeñaperros Castle, also known as San José Castle, is a castle built in the 11th century in the historic center of Cartagena, Murcia Region in Spain. It was declared a cultural site on 7 August 1997. The walls are composed of masonry and generally flat. The interior of the fortification is divided in two perimeters, the lower with rooms for the occupants and a water reservoir, and an upper space occupied by the cannons, and which has lost gunships.
