= Castle of Amer =

17th-century fortification on Mallorca, Spain

Coordinates: 39°34′48″N 3°23′46″E

- Sant Llorenç des Cardassar, Mallorca
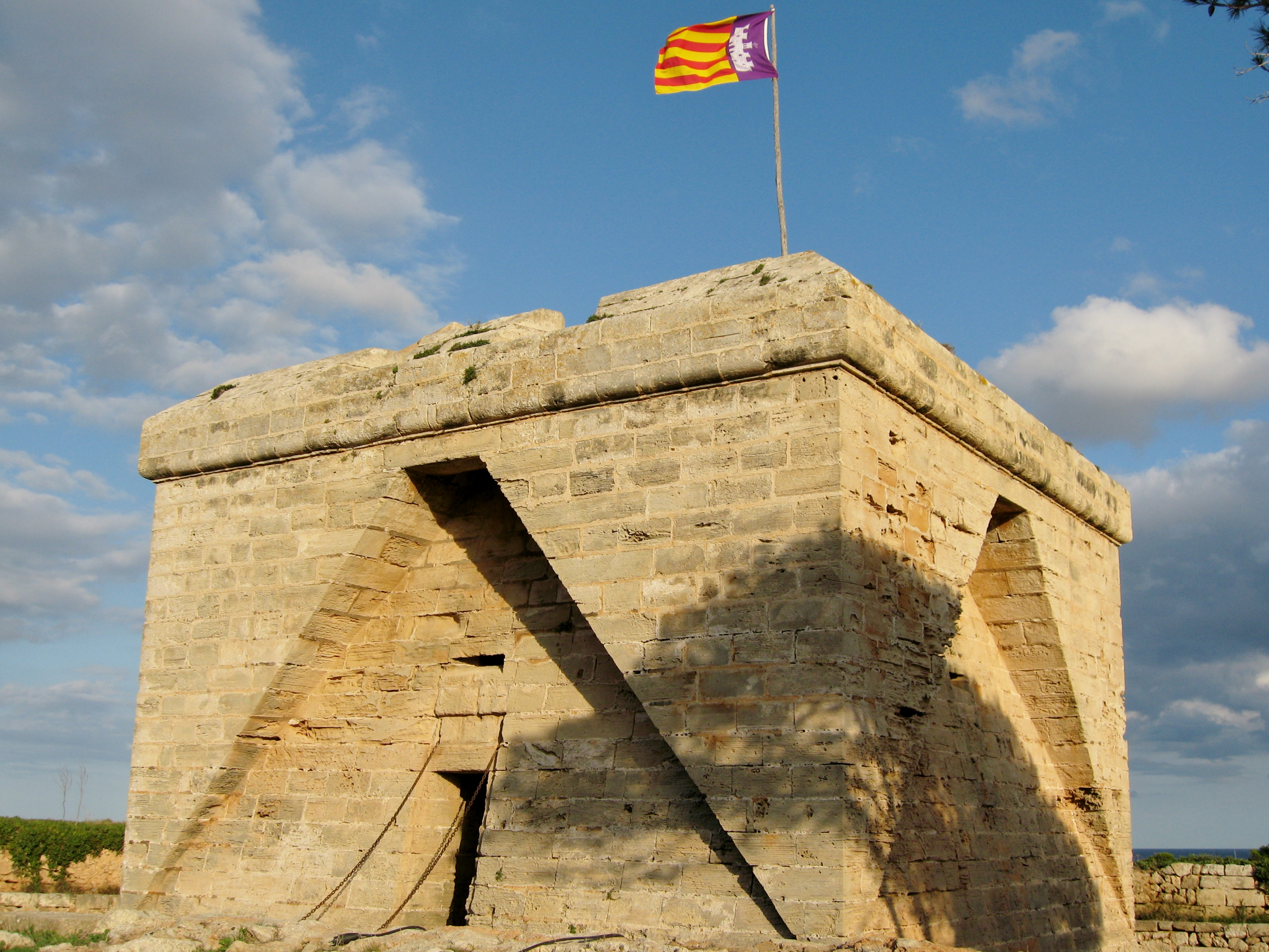

Site information
- Type: Fortification
- Condition: Protected site

Site history
- Built: 1693
- Materials: Sandstone

The Castle of la Punta de Amer (Spanish: Castillo de la Punta de Amer) is a 17th century fortification located in Sant Lorenzo des Cardessar on the island of Mallorca. The sandstone structure was built in the late 17th century, and is now a protected site.
