= Carabona Tower =

Coordinates: 39.8758°N 0.1206°W

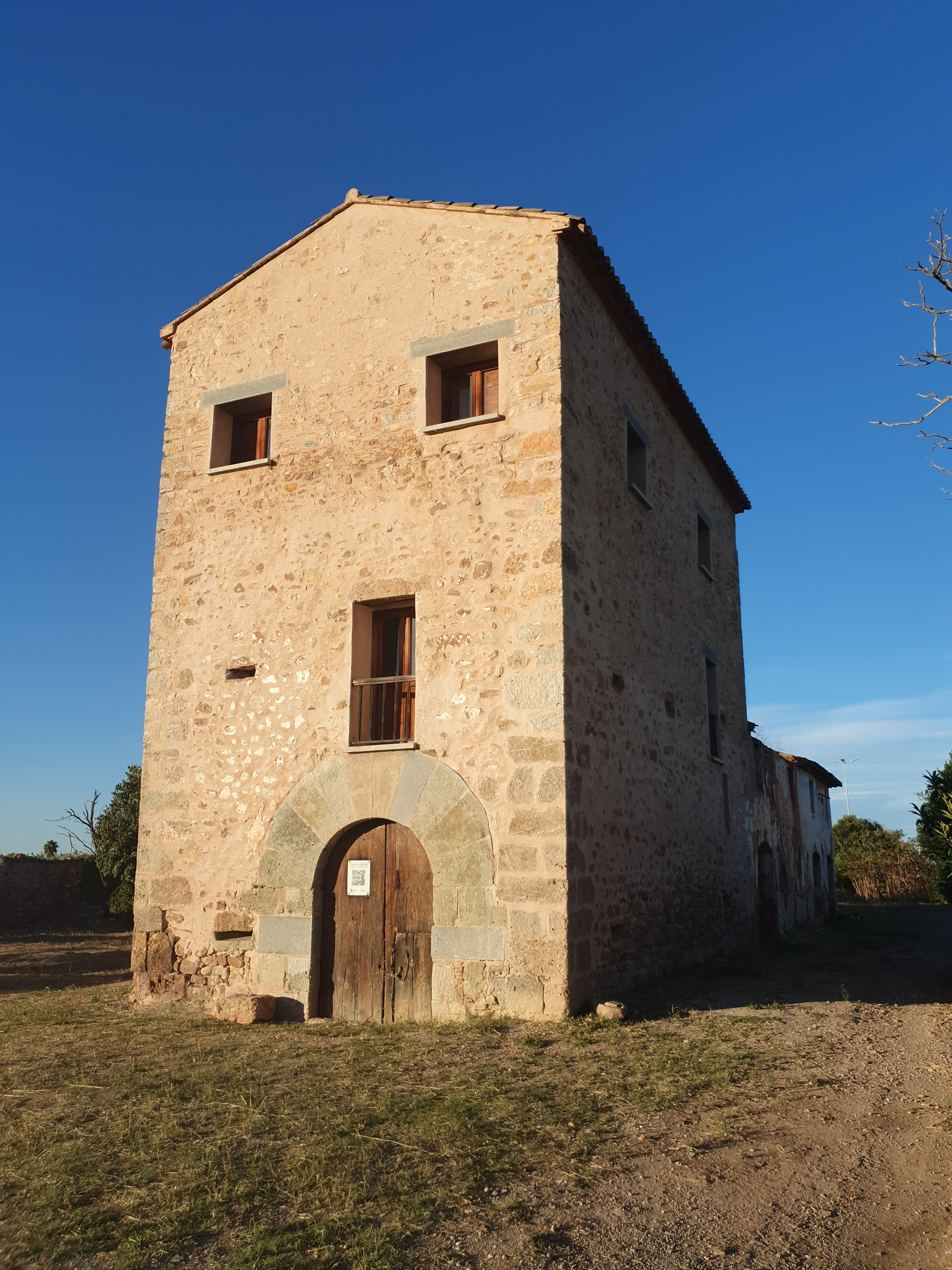
Carabona tower

The Carabona Tower, also called the Farmhouse of Carabona, is a cultural heritage site (Bien de Interés Cultural) in the municipality of Burriana (Valencian: Borriana), close to the “Camí del Palmeral” road and about 250 meters away from “Camí Vell de Valencia” road, in the region of Plana Baixa in the province of Castellón, Spain. According to the General Directory of Artistic Heritage of the Generalitat Valenciana, it received its ministerial annotation number (R-I-51-0010939) on December 4, 2002.

As its name suggests, it is an old farmhouse, built between the 13th and the 18th centuries. Thus, this fortified farmhouse has its origins in the Muslim era. Its defensive structure was required because of the need to secure areas for agricultural use outside the urban areas.

== History ==
Carabona, which was formerly called “Alberg”, became the main town in the municipality of Burriana before the Reconquista (Reconquest). After the conquest by the Christians, these territories were given to the brothers Leonardo and Juan de Ager by King James I of Aragon on November 3, 1219. Since this donation was finally not made, years later, in 1233, during the siege of Burriana, the king himself again donated Carabona, this time to the military Order of Saint George of Alfama. According to a letter of donation signed by James II of Aragon, he granted such order in March 1307. This continuous reference to the donation to the Order of Saint George of Alfama may have been caused by problems that this order had throughout its existence because, even though it was established by King Peter II of Aragon in 1201, the order was not approved by the Holy See until 1373. Besides, the order merged with the one of Montesa and that again caused considerable changes.

After the union of the Order of Saint George to the Order of Montesa in 1400, Carabona remained under the Lordship of Montesa. Years later, in the sixteenth century, Carabona ended up in the possession of Martín de Viciana and Sancho de Cardona, who disputed the ownership of Carabona. Finally, it was sold to Martín de Viciana who acquired it by purchasing the town of Nules, according to the executed deed by the notary Francisco Juan Inglés; this is documented in the Municipal Archive of Nules, in the “Llibre of Redelme”, a book dated 1590.

Later documentation, which was found in the Historic Parish Archives in Burriana, show that in 1775 the farm belonged to Margarita Llorens, who received it from her father Bautista Llorens. He had previously bought it from the Fathers of Remedio of Valencia for 4,000 pounds. Over the years, the farmhouse became the property of the heirs of Maria Garces de Marcilla and is now in the hands of Burriana's town council.

== Description ==
The tower is a rectangular building of 10.95 m by 6.10 m, with a height of up to 9.20 m; it has three floors. It has a pitched roof with eaves ending in a curved roof tiles. The three floors are connected by a vaulted staircase. The arrangement of the floors gives the impression that the original tower was smaller than it currently is. However, this is not very likely because the arrangement of the ashlar blocks at the corners of the present building shows that this would only be possible if the original tower had been almost completeletely dismantled.

A height difference between the forged steel of the first floor shows that the building was not constructed in one go, but that it was built in several stages over a longer period of time. The first stage must have started in the 13th century when the arched doorway of the facade was built. However, the arrowslits, the pillar of the top floor and the roof belong to another construction period, which took place during the 18th century (in 1755 it was converted into a farmhouse); also around this time, the four attached dwellings were added and the tower rebuilt.
Considering the typology of the residence and the division of the ground floor, it could be considered rural, as the kitchen and the living area are in the same room, which is also connected to the stables, whilst the bedrooms are on the upper floor. In the staircase leading to the bedrooms, remains were found of what could have been an old chimney at that time.
The bedroom that is located behind the main facade has a balcony door with a wooden handrail as well as a little window, which is walled up on the inside.
The room in the back, however, has a higher ceiling and three small windows in its walls. The staircase that leads to the second floor was built a long time after the one leading to the first floor and could be called an “implanted staircase”.
The group of buildings is made up of the tower itself, the four dwellings next to it, which are built in a vernacular architectural style, a large brick wall enclosure, and the remains of other buildings adjoining the tower.
Its current owner, the town council of Burriana, started the restoration works of the Carabona Tower in 2002 because it was in imminent danger of collapsing. The architect Francisco Taberner carried out the restoration project, which included plans to work on the foundations, the walls, the forged steel and the roofs. Though some modifications have had to be made, the aim is to maintain the original configuration. For this reason, it is essential to hide the reinforcements made. The only visible change planned in the project was to change the staircase to the second floor and replace it with a wooden one.

The reinforcements and improvements that are necessary to stabilise the foundation will be carried out in a way that affects the exterior of the tower as little as possible, especially the characteristic ashlar blocks that reinforce its corners.
