= Torre Ladrones =

Coordinates: 36.4853°N 4.7433°W

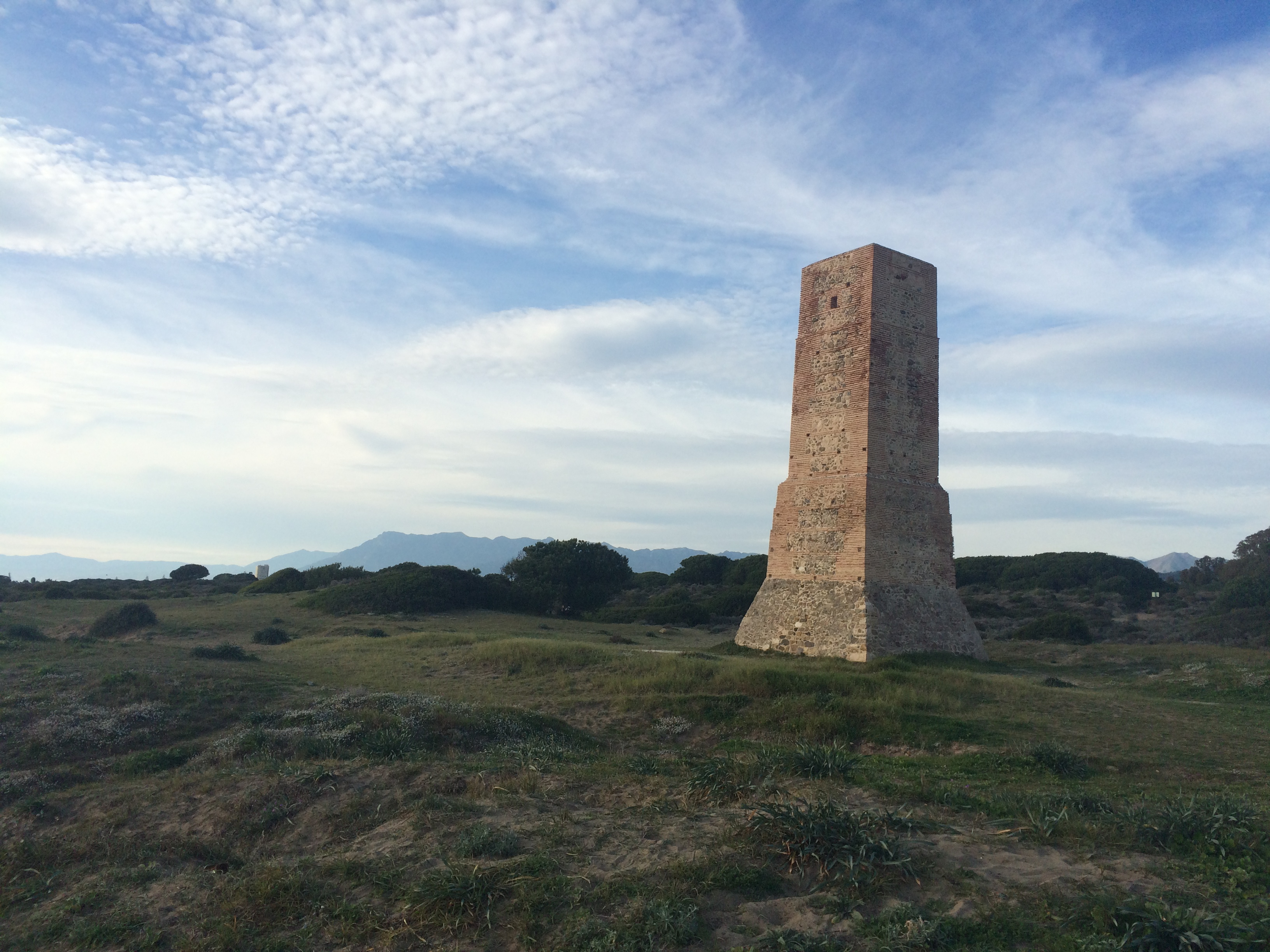
Torre Ladrones next to the dunes in Artola (Cabopino).

Torre Ladrones (Thieves Tower) is a tower on the Puerto de Cabopino beach in Marbella, Spain. It is part of the coastal fortification line along the Andalusian Mediterranean coast. Both the architecture and the materials used, indicate that Torre Ladrones was built during the period of Arab domination in the Spanish peninsula. It is 15 meters high, a figure that makes it the tallest watchtower of the Malaga coast. The interior is divided into three rooms and a housetop. At that time, its role was clearly defensive: to warn of potential enemies and to organize a coordinated defense in case the enemy attacked.

Torre Ladrones was declared Bien de Interés Cultural (Good of Cultural Interest) in 1985, and it is one of the most visited monuments in Marbella.
