= Castilla Beach =

Beach in Spain

Playa de Castilla
- Beach
- Location: Spain

Dimensions
  - Length: 20 km (12 mi)
  - Width: 1.5 km (0.93 mi)

Castilla Beach is the name of the Spanish coastline in part of the Province of Huelva from Doñana until of the zone of Mazagón in the zone of Arenas Gordas.

20 km in length, it gets its name from the Reconquista, it was granted this name in honor of the King of Castile, forming part of the first exit to the Atlantic Ocean through the south of the Iberian Peninsula of the territories of the Crown of Castile. With fine sandy beaches and dunes, places such as El Asperillo, recognized as a National Monument of Andalusia, the base of El Arenosillo, the "Cuesta Maneli", as well as the beaches of Julián, Morla and Mazagón stand out. Currently only a few sections are available for use by bathers.
