= Hospital Bazán =

Former hospital turned museum in Marbella, Spain

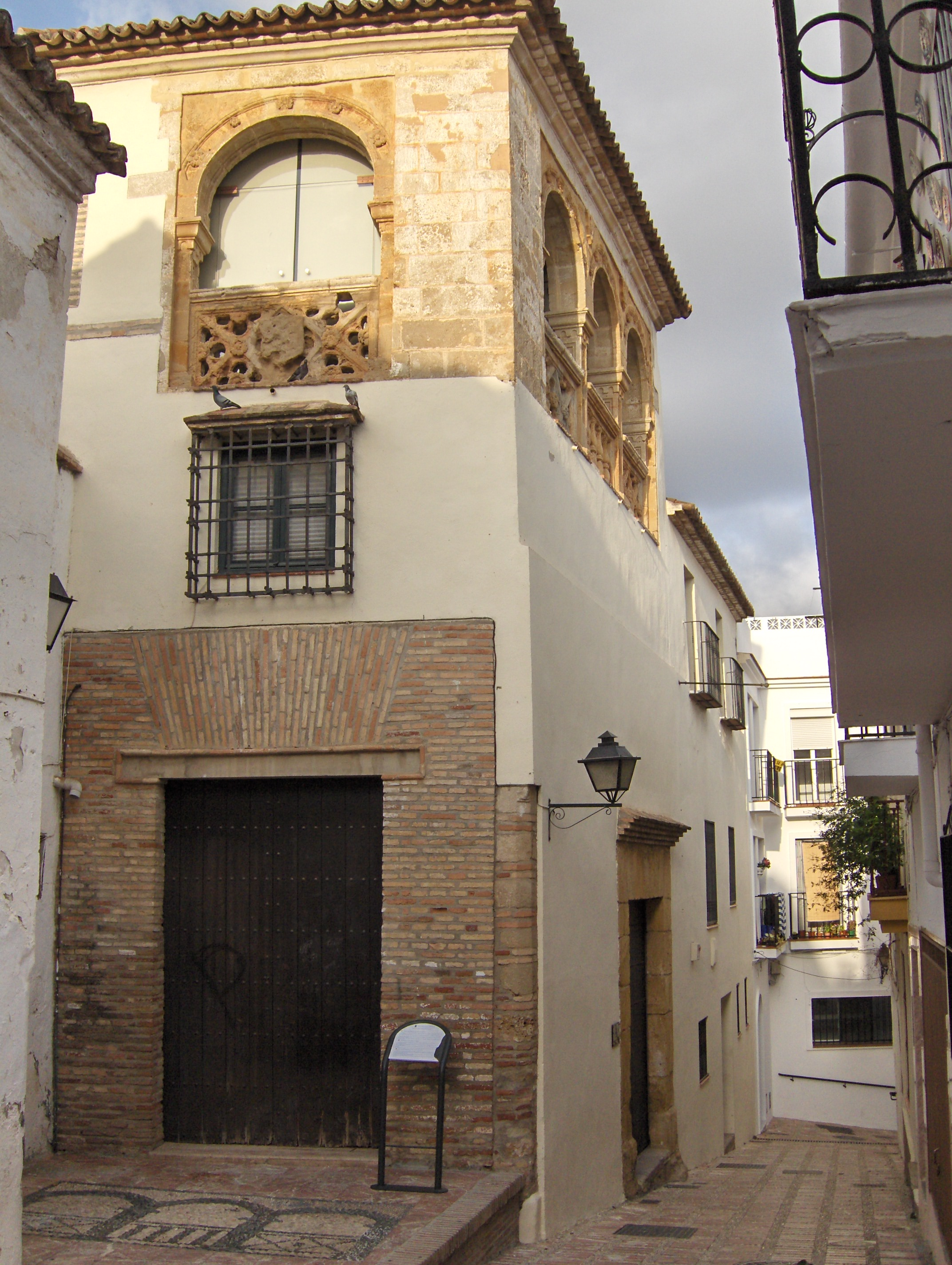
- Hospital Bazán

Geography
- Location: Marbella, Andalucia, Spain
- Coordinates: 36.5101°N 4.8829°W

Organisation
- Type: General
- Religious affiliation: Roman Catholic

History
- Opened: first half of 16th century

Links
- Lists: Hospitals in Spain

The Hospital Bazán is a historical building in Marbella, Andalucia, Spain. Today it houses the Museum of Contemporary Spanish Engravings or "Museo del Grabado Español Contemporáneo".

== History ==
This hospital was built in the first half of the 16th century. It was built in two stages, and in different architectural styles. Part of the building is in the Mudéjar style of architecture typical of late medieval Spain.

The facility was built with a donation left for this purpose in the Will of Don Alfonso de Bazán, who had spent his life in the city. The Will instructed that a hospital was to be built for the poor of the neighborhood. Bazán left his two adjoining houses to be used for this purpose, under the name of "Our Lady of the Incarnation" (Spanish: Santa María de la Encarnación). In addition to the hospital wards, there was a chapel in the complex which also served as the burial crypt for the Bazán family.

The donor set up a Board of Directors to supervise the running of the hospital, which task they carried out until the early 20th century. He also entrusted its pastoral care to the Trinitarian friars who had a monastery adjacent to the building, which has now disappeared.

The hospital has been designated as an Andalucian Historical Monument.
