= Villa romana de Río Verde =

Archaeological site in Marbella, Spain

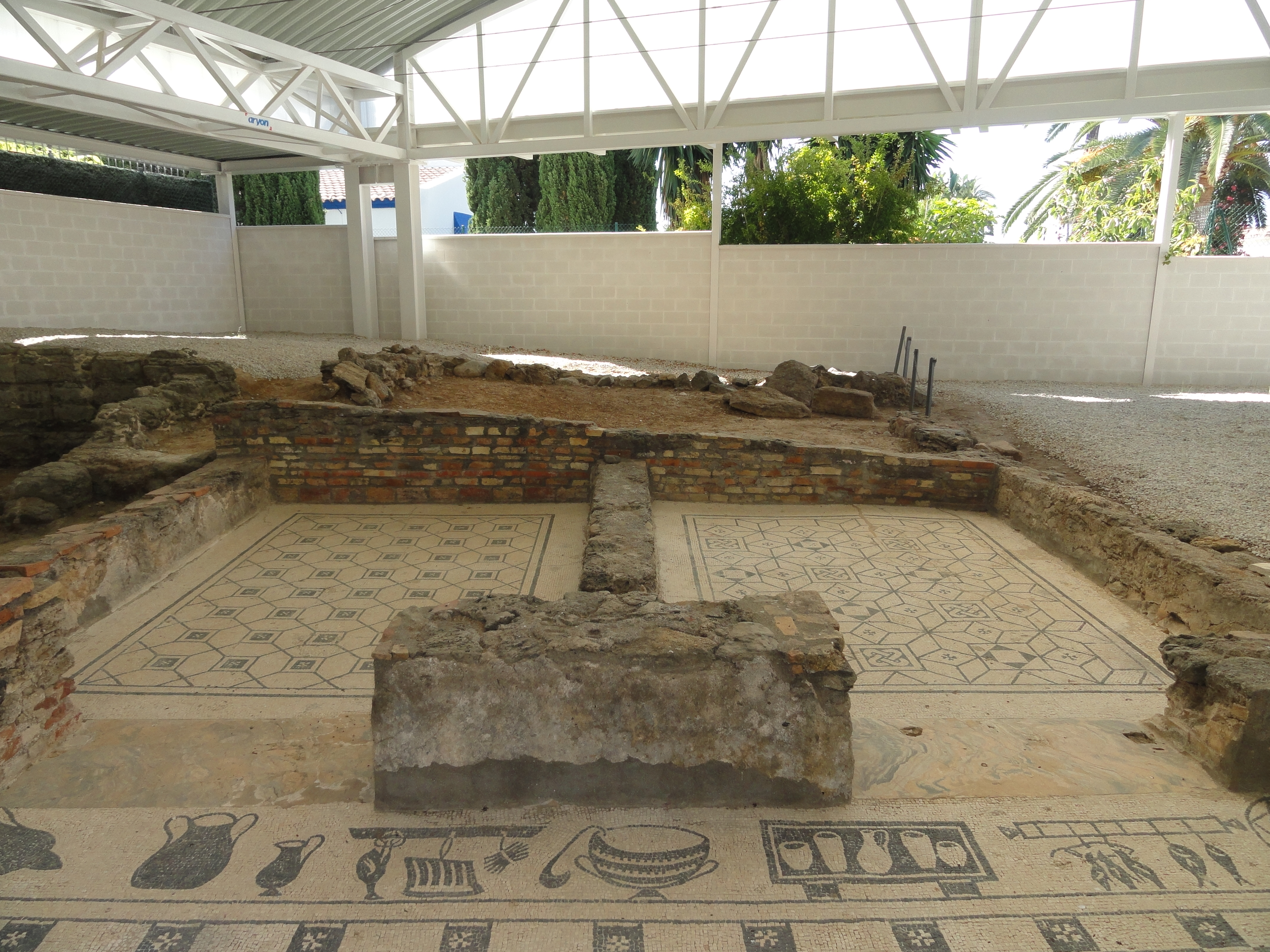

Villa romana de Río Verde is a Roman villa on the coast of Marbella, Spain, at the mouth of the Río Verde river. It represents the pars urbana (urban section) of an affluent coastal villa, where its pars rustica (rural part) would have been dedicated to marine exploitation and the salting of fish —a profitable activity pursued by many coastal settlements in the Baetic region, especially during the Roman era. This is evident in some of the decorative elements of the culinary mosaic that adorns the residential area of the house.

== Excavations ==
The uniqueness of the mosaic floors documented in this villa, especially the culinary mosaic, is further emphasized by the fact that it is one of the few examples we have on the Andalusian coast of the elite section of these types of settlements. It's essential for understanding the domestic environment in which middle-to-upper-class families lived during this period. Concerning the villa, archaeological excavations conducted since 1960 have revealed a portion of the rooms of this house, offering only an incomplete view of the villa. Additionally, it's possible that its vicinity might contain the working or fructuary area of the villa —a salting factory where, based on the remains documented so far, in addition to the production of fish-based sauces, a highly prized purple dye was likely produced for trade.

The discovered rooms have unveiled an array of high-quality mosaic designs of diverse themes, decorating the Pseudoperipteros and adjoining rooms. The high technical proficiency observed in the creation of these floors, as well as their unique thematic distinctiveness, stand out.
