= Sant Antoni Castle =

- Castell de Sant Antoni
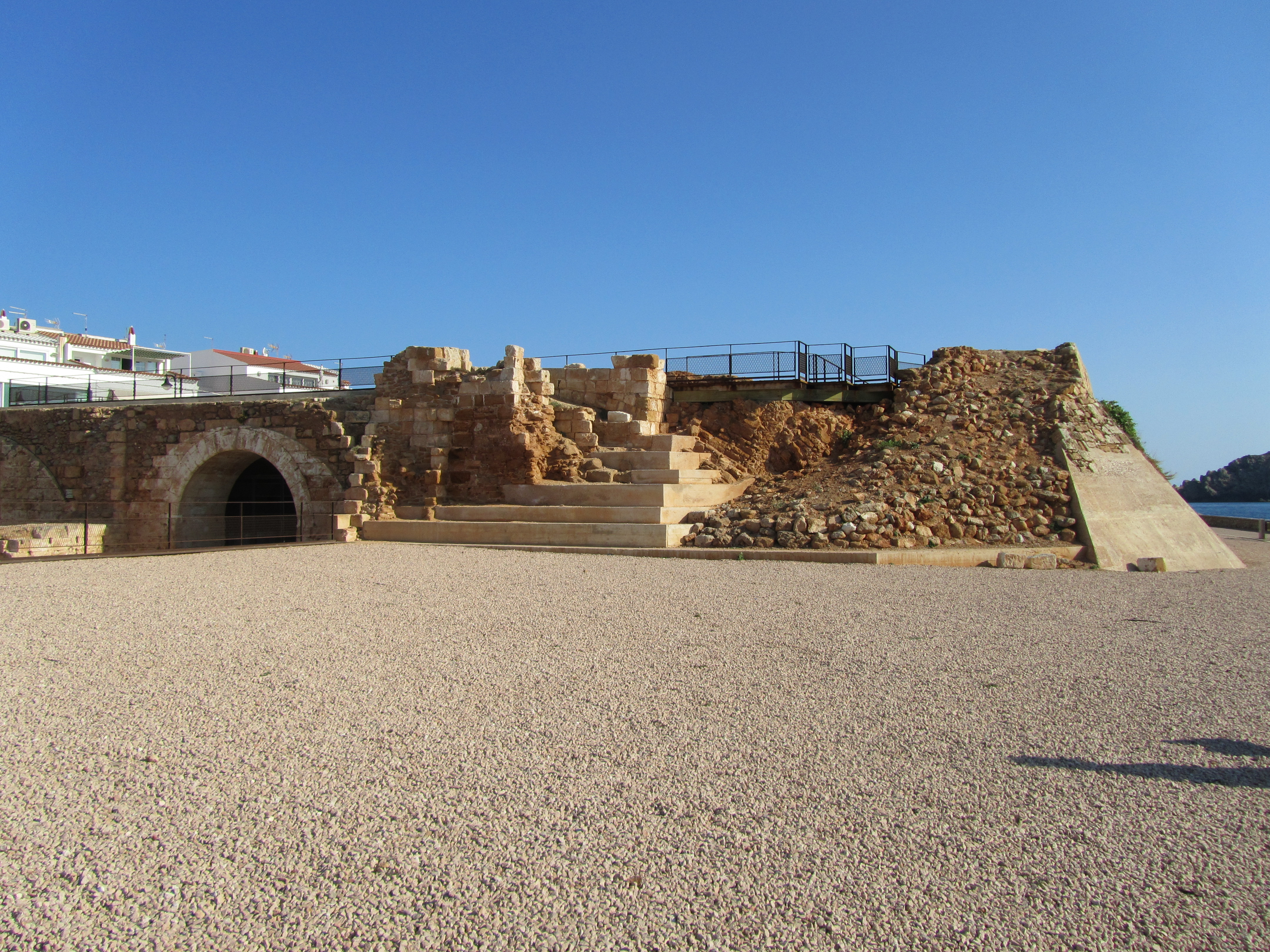
- Interactive map of the Sant Antoni Castle area

General information
- Location: Fornells, Spain
- Coordinates: 40°03′26″N 4°08′00″E
- Completed: 17th century

The Sant Antoni Castle (Catalan: Castell de Sant Antoni, Spanish: Castillo de San Antonio) is a fortress located in the Spanish village of Fornells, in the municipality of Es Mercadal, in Menorca. It was built in the 17th century in the local harbour and due to this building, the town was born.

Only some ruins are left from the structure, as it was dismantled by the Spanish after the British domination, just like St. Philip's Castle. Not far from there, there is the Fornells Tower, a defensive tower whose objective was protecting the castle from enemy attacks.
