= Spanish historical heritage =

Patrimonio histórico español is a term for Spain's heritage, including National Heritage Sites. The Ministry of Culture has a department, the Subdirección General de Protección del Patrimonio Histórico ("Bureau of Protection of Historical Heritage") which maintains a heritage register.

The term has a similar meaning to Bien de Interés Cultural (BIC), a designation which includes non-moveable heritage objects such as monuments or historic gardens, as well as moveable heritage objects such as archeological objects, archives and large works of art. The Spanish system is semi-federal and regions have their own registers.

The León Cathedral became the first monument protected as a National Monument in 1844.

== Heritage list holders ==
Administration		Regulation	Registration
	Ministry of Culture. Bureau of Protection of Historical Heritage	Ley 16/1985 del patrimonio histórico español	Registro General de Bienes de Interés Cultural and Inventario General de Bienes Muebles
Andalusia	Ministry of Culture. Directorate General for Cultural Property	Ley 14/2007 del Patrimonio Histórico de Andalucía	Sistema de Información del Patrimonio Histórico de Andalucía (SIPHA)
Aragon	Department of Education, Culture, and Sport. General Directorate of Cultural Heritage	Ley 3/1999 del Patrimonio Cultural Aragonés	Sistema de Información del Patrimonio Cultural Aragonés (SIPCA)
Asturias	Ministry of Culture, Social Communication and Tourism. Directorate General for Cultural Promotion and Language Policy	Ley del Principado de Asturias 1/2001 de Patrimonio Cultural	Registro de Bienes de Interés Cultural and Inventario del Patrimonio Cultural
Balearic Islands	Ministry of Education and Culture. Directorate General of Culture (Note: In the Balearic and Canary Islands management is transferred to island councils)	Llei 12/1998 del Patrimoni Històric de les Illes Balears	Registre de Béns d'Interès Cultural and Catàleg Insular del Patrimoni Històric
Basque Country	Department of Culture. Directorate of Cultural Heritage	LEY 6/2019, de 9 de mayo, de Patrimonio Cultural Vasco	Ondarea (Basque Cultural Heritage)
Canary Islands	Ministry of Education, Culture and Sports. Directorate General of Historical Heritage	Ley 4/1999 de Patrimonio Histórico de Canarias	Registro de Bienes de Interés Cultural and Inventario de Bienes Muebles
Cantabria	Ministry of Culture, Tourism and Sport. Directorate General for Culture	Ley 11/1998 de Patrimonio Cultural de Cantabria	Registro de Bienes de Interés Cultural and Catálogo del Patrimonio Cultural
Castile-La Mancha	Ministry of Culture. Directorate General of Heritage and Museums	Ley 4/1990 del Patrimonio Histórico de Castilla-La Mancha	Registro de Bienes de Interés Cultural and Inventario de Bienes Muebles
Castile and León	Ministry of Culture and Tourism. Directorate General of Heritage and Cultural Assets	Ley 12/2002 de Patrimonio Cultural de Castilla y Leon	Catálogo de Bienes de Interés Cultural and Inventario de Bienes del Patrimonio Cultural
Catalonia	Department of Culture. General Directorate of Cultural Heritage	Llei 9/1993 del patrimoni cultural català	Inventari del Patrimoni Cultural Català: Registre de Béns Culturals d'Interès Nacional and Catàleg del Patrimoni Cultural
Valencia	Ministry of Culture, Tourism and Sport. General Directorate of Cultural Heritage Valencia	Llei 4/1998 del Patrimoni Cultural Valencià	Inventari General del Patrimoni Cultural Valencià
Extremadura	Ministry of Education and Culture. General Directorate of Cultural Heritage	Ley 2/1999 de patrimonio histórico y cultural de Extremadura	Registro de Bienes de Interés Cultural and Inventario del Patrimonio Histórico y Cultural
Galicia	Ministry of Culture and Tourism. General Directorate of Cultural Heritage	Ley 8/1995 del patrimonio cultural de Galicia	Inventario general del patrimonio cultural: Registro de Bienes de Interés Cultural and Catálogo del Patrimonio Cultural.
Madrid	Ministry of Culture and Sport. Directorate General of Historical Heritage	Ley 10/1998 de Patrimonio Histórico de la Comunidad de Madrid	Registro de Bienes de Interés Cultural and Inventario de Bienes Culturales
Murcia	Ministry of Education and Culture. Directorate General for Culture	Ley 4/2007 de Patrimonio Cultural de la Región de Murcia	Registro de Bienes de Interés Cultural, Catálogo del Patrimonio Cultural and Inventario de Bienes Culturales
Navarra	Department of Culture, Tourism and Institutional Relations. General Directorate of Cultural Heritage	Ley foral 14/2005 del Patrimonio Cultural de Navarra	Registro de Bienes del Patrimonio Cultural
La Rioja	Ministry of Education, Culture and Tourism. Directorate General for Culture	Ley 7/2004 de Patrimonio Cultural, Histórico y Artístico de La Rioja	Registro General del Patrimonio Cultural, Histórico y Artístico: Inventario de Bienes de Interés Cultural and Inventario de Bienes Culturales de Interés Regional

== See also ==
- Culture of Spain
- Cultural Heritage
- Patrimonio Nacional
