= Bien de Interés Cultural =

Cultural property of Spain

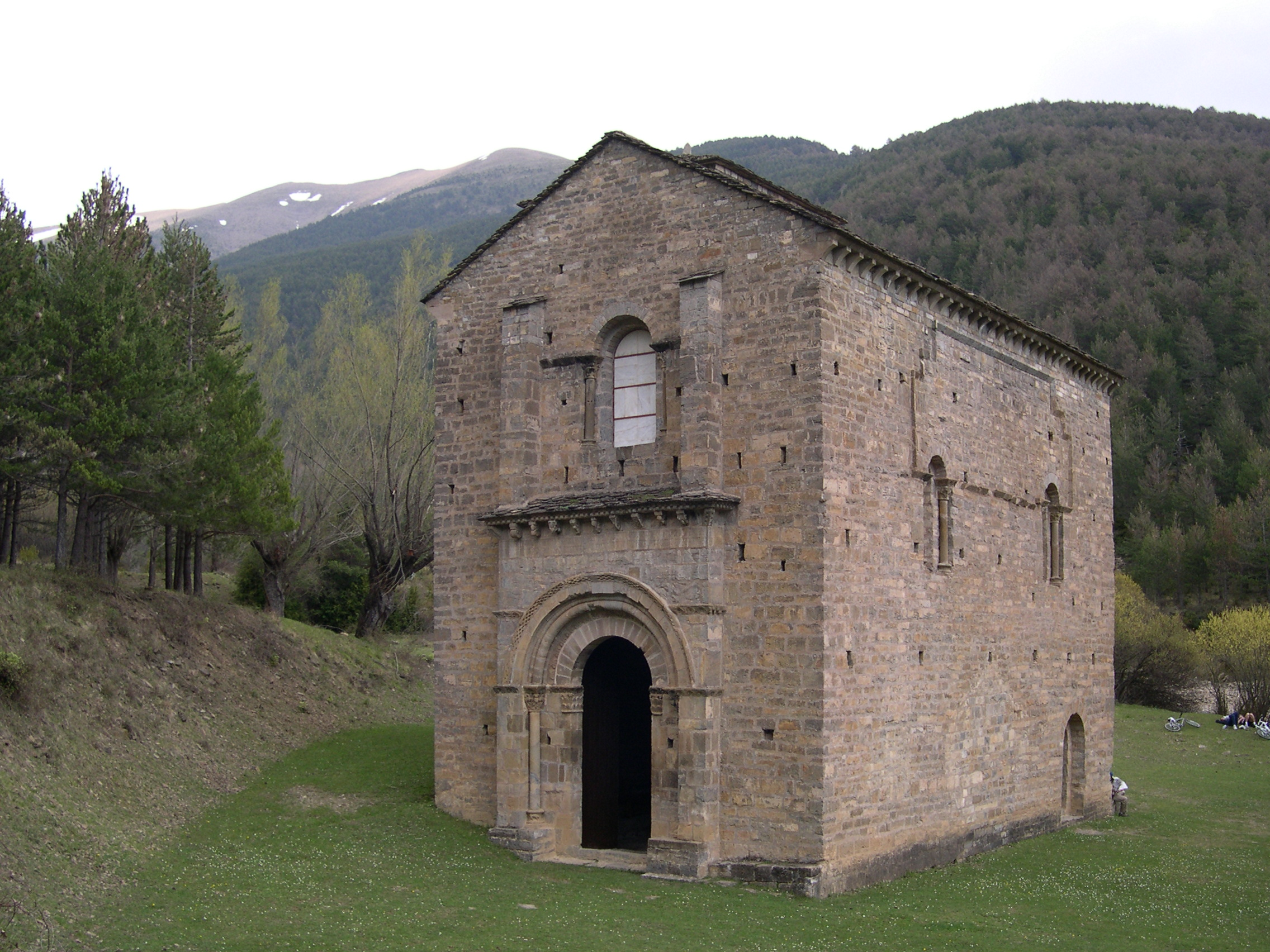
A Romanesque church in Aragon with Bien de Interés Cultural status

Bien de Interés Cultural (Basque: Kultura Intereseko Ondasun, Catalan: Bé d'Interès Cultural, Valencian: Bé d'Interés Cultural, Galician: Ben de Interese Cultural) is a category of the heritage register in Spain. The term is also used in Colombia and other Spanish-speaking countries.

The term literally means a "good of cultural interest" ("goods" in the economic sense). It includes not only material heritage (cultural property), like monuments or movable works of art, but also intangible cultural heritage, such as the Silbo Gomero language.

Some bienes enjoy international protection as World Heritage Sites or Masterpieces of the Oral and Intangible Heritage of Humanity.

== History ==
In Spain, the Bien de Interés Cultural category dates from 1985 when it replaced the former heritage category of Monumento nacional (national monument) to extend protection to a wider range of cultural property. The category has been translated as "Cultural Interest Asset." Monumentos are now identified as one of the sub-categories of Bien de Interés Cultural.

== Sub-categories ==
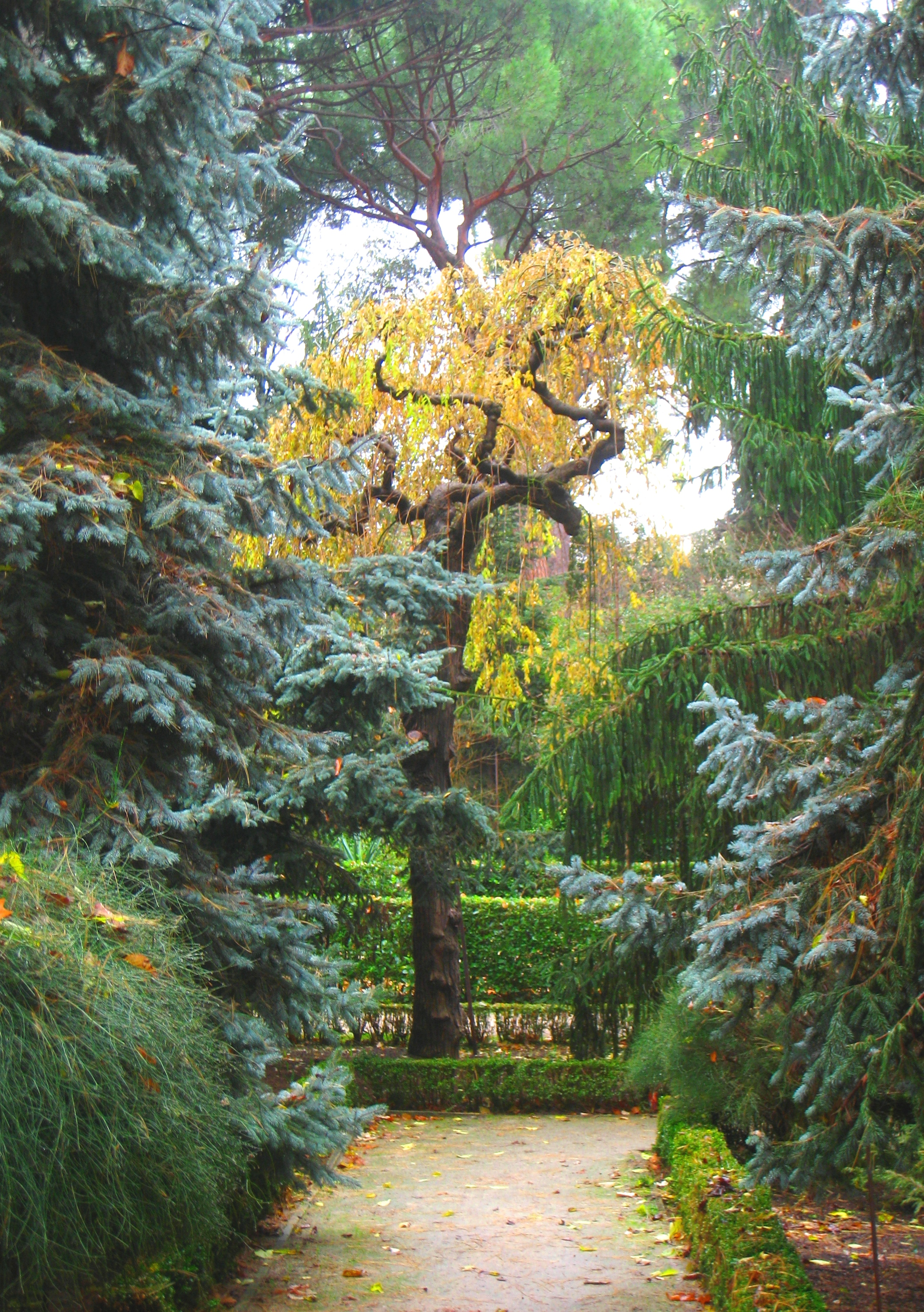
Jardín histórico: Royal Botanical Garden, Madrid

The movable heritage designated as Bienes de Interés Cultural ("Cultural Interest Assets") includes archeological artfacts, archives and large works of art. Such protected objects may well be kept in a building which is itself a BIC.

- Non-movable heritage is divided into the following classifications:
  - Monumento (monument)
  - Conjunto histórico (historical ensemble, group or set)
  - Jardín histórico (historical garden, e.g. the Real Jardín Botánico de Madrid)
  - Sitio histórico (literally a historic site, the term is used for cultural landscapes, e.g. Riotinto mines)
  - Zona arqueológica (archaeological area or zone, e.g. Archaeological site of Atapuerca)

== Regional variants ==
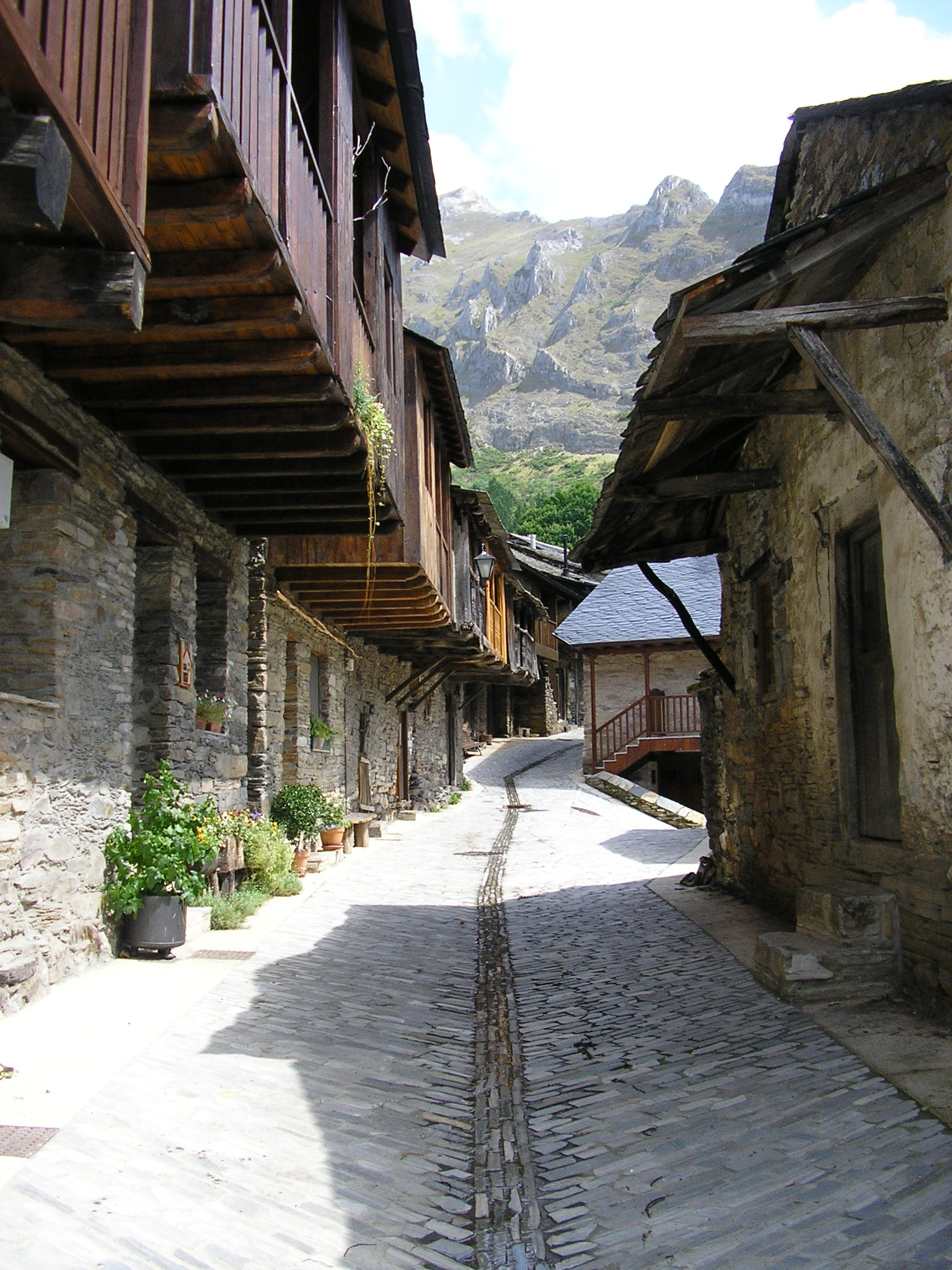
This village is recognised as a Conjunto Etnológico.

Under the Spanish system, regions maintain their registers of cultural heritage (see Patrimonio histórico español). There have been some differences in approach between autonomous communities. An example is bullfighting (which at a national level is now regulated by the Ministry of Culture). Madrid's regional government considers that bullfighting events should be protected as cultural heritage. In contrast, in Catalonia a ban on bullfighting came into effect in 2012, although this was later overturned by the Supreme Court.

== See also ==
- Lists of Bienes de Interés Cultural
- Patrimonio histórico español
