= Spanish architecture =

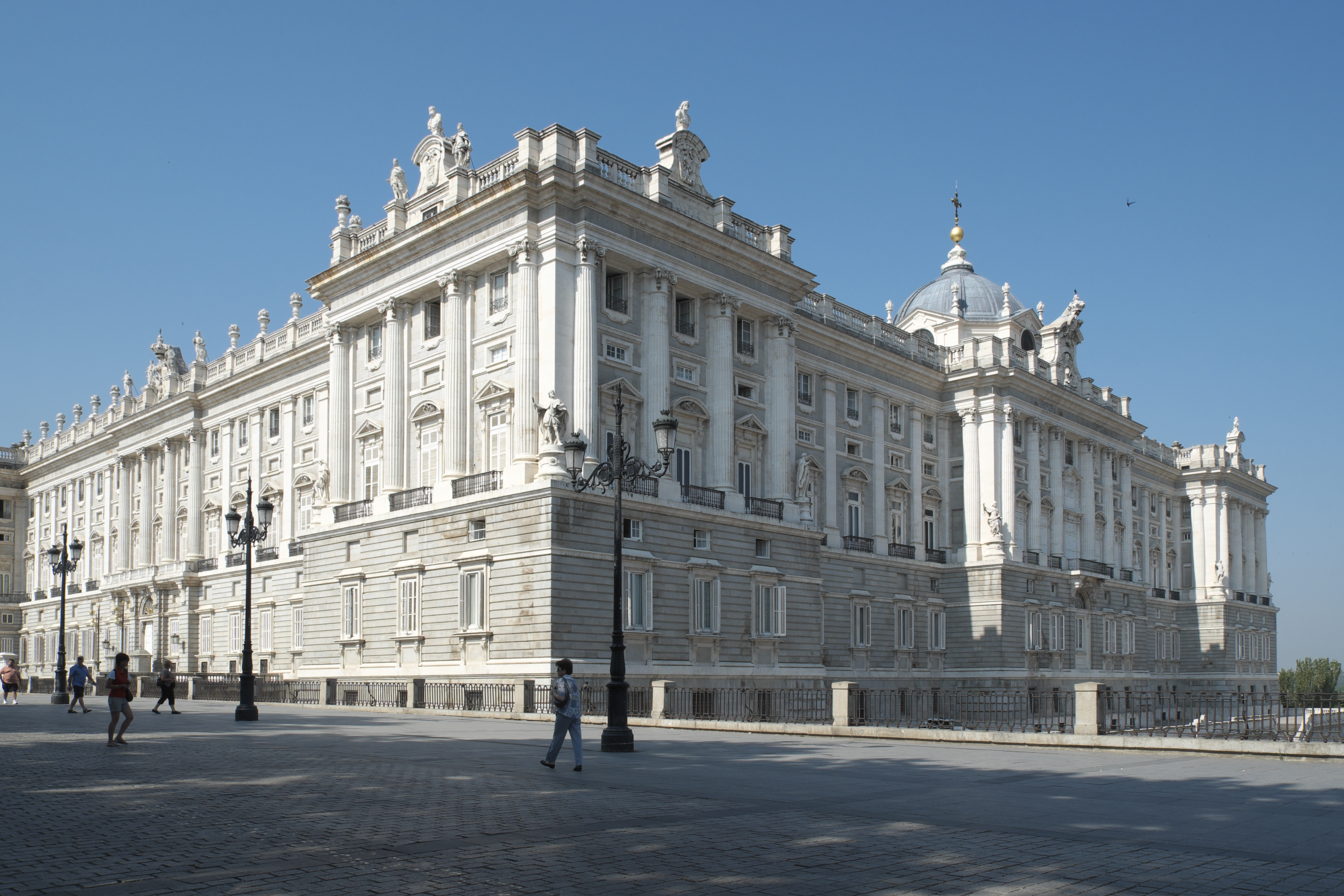
Royal Palace of Madrid

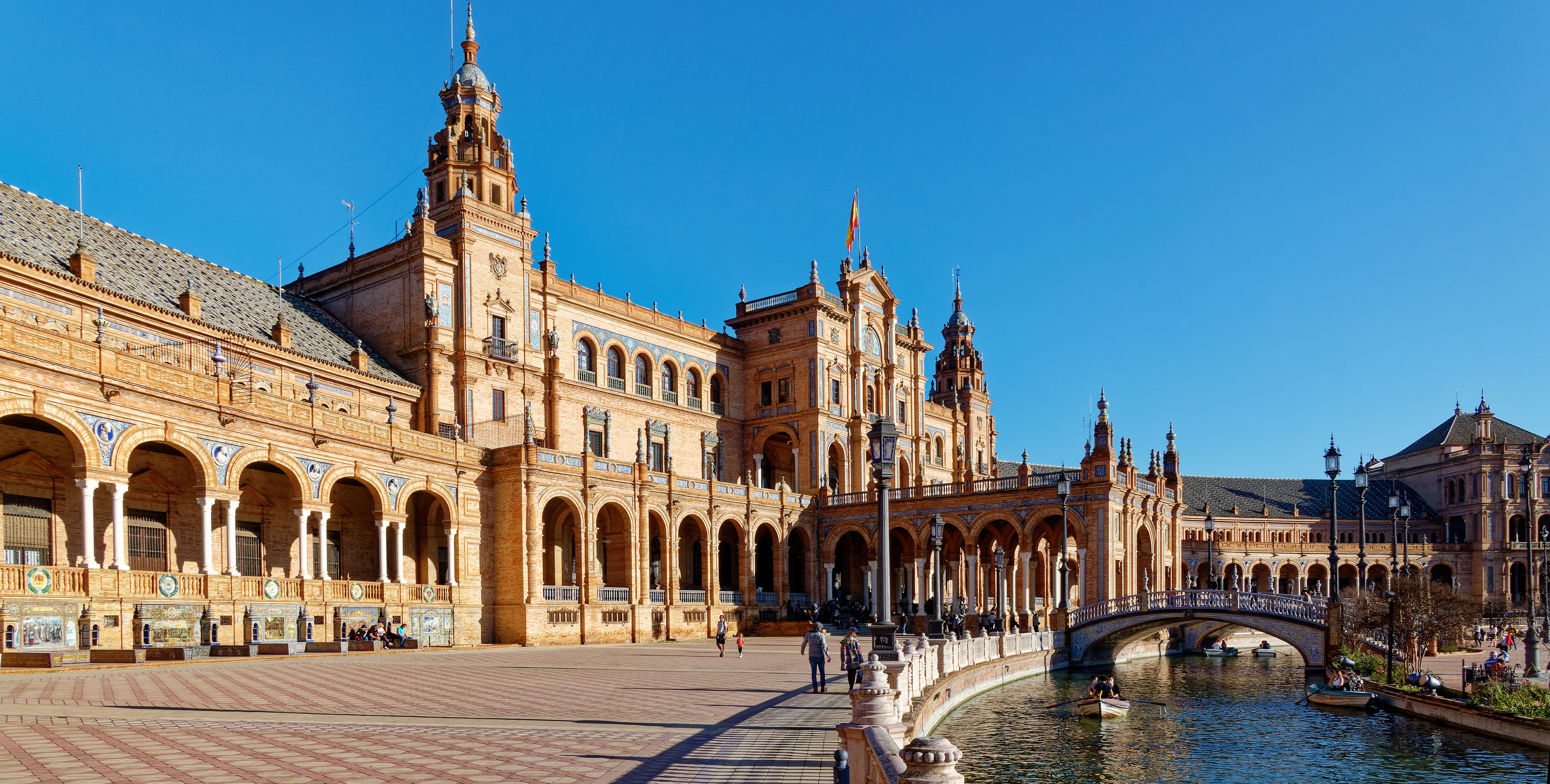
Plaza de España, Seville

Spanish architecture refers to architecture in any area of what is now Spain, and by Spanish architects worldwide, influencing mainly areas of what was once part of the Spanish Empire. The term includes buildings which were constructed within the current borders of Spain prior to its existence as a nation, when the land was called Iberia, Hispania, or was divided between several Christian and Muslim kingdoms. Spanish architecture demonstrates great historical and geographical diversity, depending on the historical period. It developed along similar lines as other architectural styles around the Mediterranean and from Central and Northern Europe, although some Spanish constructions are unique.

A real development came with the arrival of the Romans, who left behind some of their most outstanding monuments in Hispania. The arrival of the Visigoths brought about a profound decline in building techniques which was paralleled in the rest of the former Roman Empire. The Muslim conquest in 711 CE led to a radical change and for the following eight centuries there were great advances in culture, including architecture. For example, Córdoba was established as the cultural capital of its time under the Umayyad dynasty. Simultaneously, Christian kingdoms such as Castile and Aragon gradually emerged and developed their own styles, at first mostly isolated from other European architectural influences, and soon later integrated into Romanesque and Gothic and Renaissance streams, they reached an extraordinary peak with numerous samples along the whole territory. There were also some samples of Mudéjar style, from the 12th to 16th centuries, characterised by the blending of Romanesque, Gothic and Renaissance architectural styles with constructive, ornamental, and decorative motifs derived from those that had been brought to or developed in Al-Andalus.

Towards the end of the 15th century, and before influencing with its Colonial architecture, Spain itself experimented with Renaissance architecture, developed mostly by local architects. Spanish Baroque was distinguished by its exuberant Churrigueresque decoration and the most sober Herrerian style, both developing separately from later international influences. The Colonial style, which has lasted for centuries, still has a strong influence. Neoclassicism reached its peak in the work of Juan de Villanueva and his disciples.

The 19th century had two faces: the engineering efforts to achieve a new language and bring about structural improvements using iron and glass as the main building materials, and the academic focus, firstly on revivals and eclecticism, and later on regionalism. The arrival of Modernisme in the academic arena produced figures such as Gaudí and much of the architecture of the 20th century. The International style was led by groups like GATEPAC. Spain is currently experiencing a revolution in contemporary architecture and Spanish architects like Rafael Moneo, Santiago Calatrava, Ricardo Bofill as well as many others have gained worldwide renown.

Many architectural sites in Spain, and even portions of cities, have been designated World Heritage Sites by UNESCO. Spain has the third highest number of World Heritage Sites in the world; only Italy and China have more. These are listed at List of World Heritage Sites in Europe: Spain.

== Prehistory ==
=== Megalithic architecture ===
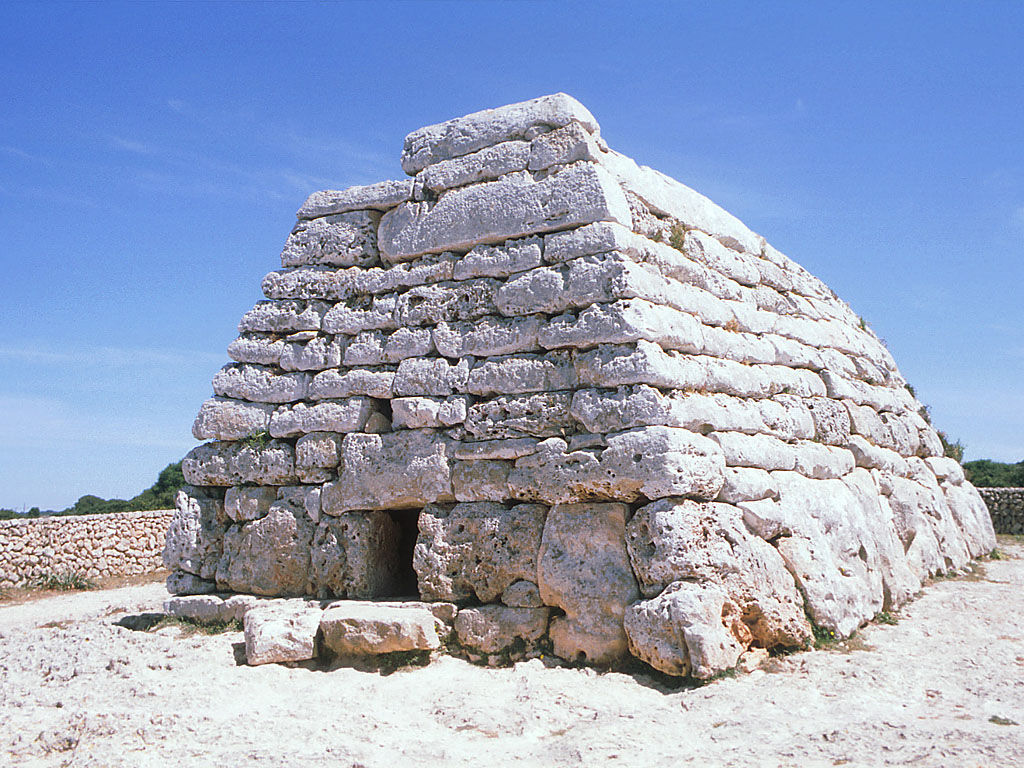
Naveta d'Es Tudons, in Menorca

In the Stone Age, the most common megalith found in the Iberian Peninsula was the dolmen. The plans of these funerary chambers used to be pseudocircles or trapezoids, formed by huge stones stuck on the ground, and others over them, forming the roof. As the typology evolved, an entrance corridor appeared, and gradually took prominence and became almost as wide as the chamber. Roofed corridors and false domes were common in the most advanced stage. The complex of Antequera contains the largest dolmens in Europe. The best preserved, the Cueva de Menga, is twenty-five metres deep and four metres high, and was built with thirty-two megaliths.

The best preserved examples of architecture from the Bronze Age are located in the Balearic Islands, where three kinds of construction appeared: the T-shaped taula, the talayot and the naveta. The talayots were troncoconical or troncopiramidal defensive towers. They used to have a central pillar. The navetas, were constructions made of great stones and their shape was similar to a ship hull.

=== Iberian and Celtic architecture ===
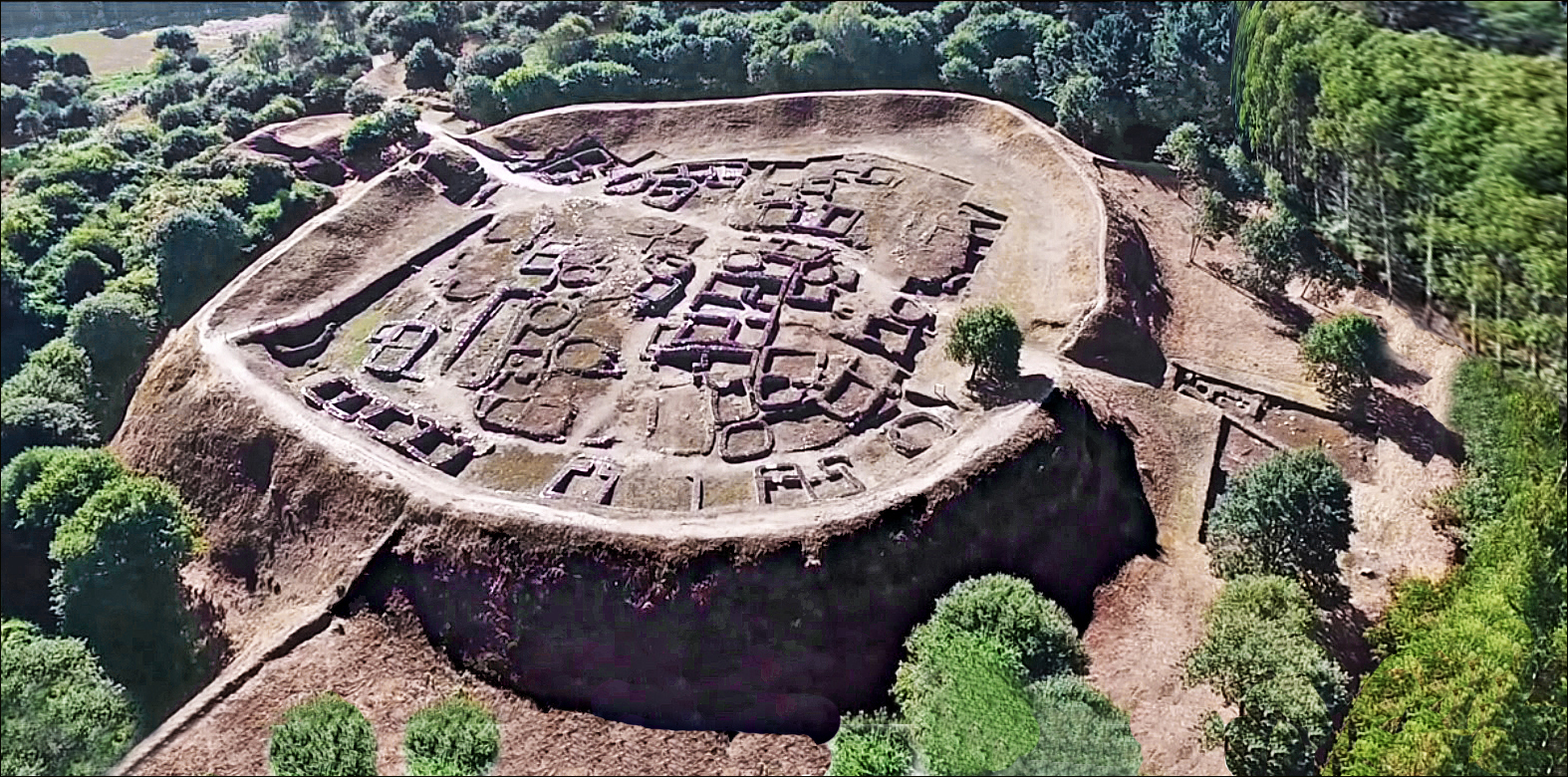
Celtic settlements in Galicia: Castro de Viladonga

The most characteristic constructions of the Celts were the castros, walled villages usually on the top of hills or mountains. They were developed at the areas occupied by the Celts in the Douro valley (Portugal) and in Galicia. Examples include Las Cogotas, in Ávila, the Castro of Santa Tecla, in Pontevedra in Spain. The houses inside the castros are about 3.5 to 5 meters long, mostly circular with some rectangular, stone-made and with thatch roofs which rested on a wood column in the centre of the building. Their streets are somewhat regular, suggesting some form of central organization.

The towns built by the Arévacos were related to Iberian culture, and some of them reached notable urban development like Numantia. Others were more primitive and usually excavated into the rock, like Termantia.

== Roman ==
=== Urban development ===
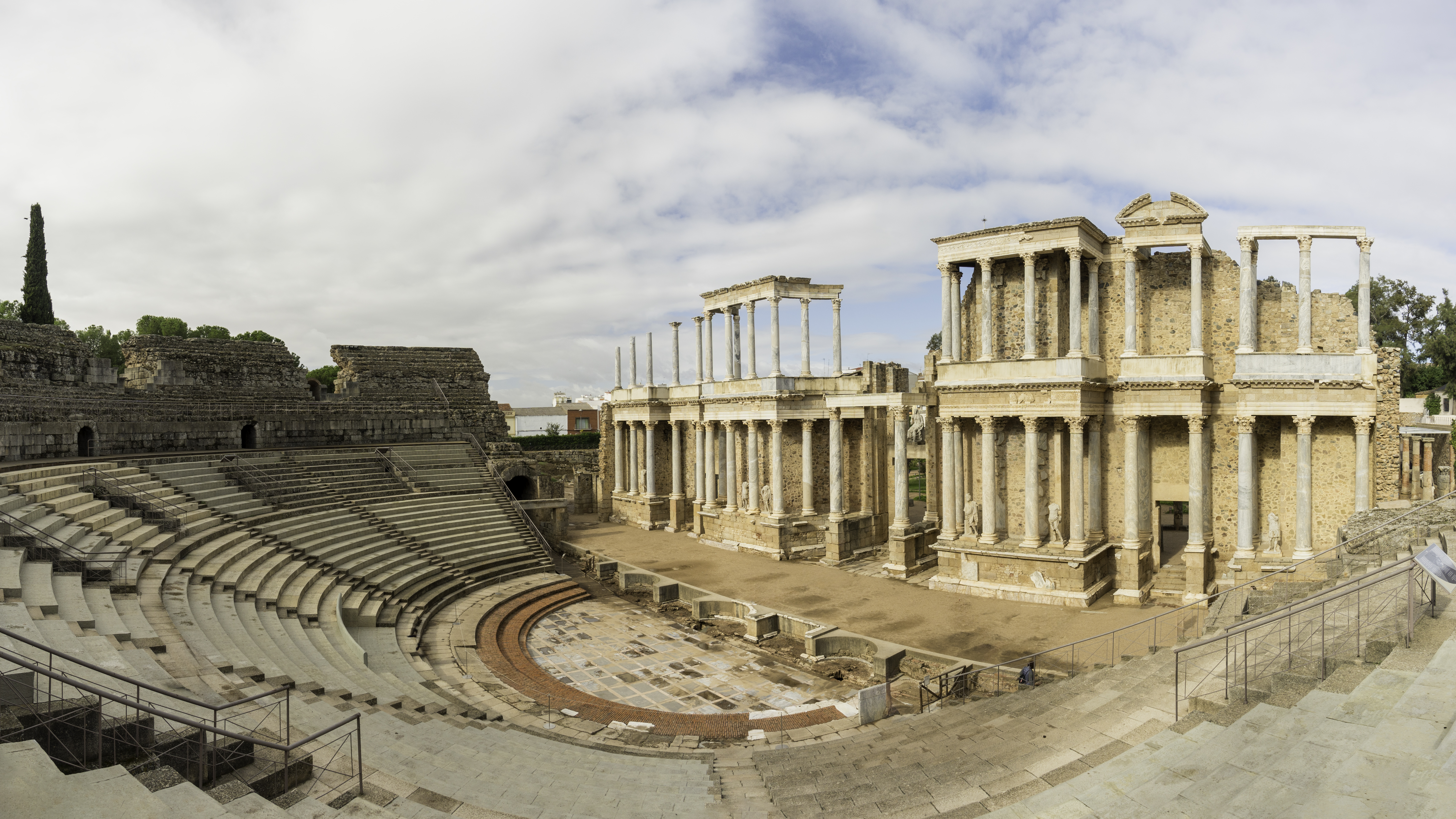
Roman theater in Mérida

The Roman conquest, started in 218 BC, promoted the almost complete romanization of the Iberian Peninsula. Roman culture was fully assimilated by the local population. Former military camps and Iberian, Phoenician and Greek settlements were transformed into large cities where urbanization highly developed in the provinces; Augusta Emerita in the Lusitania, Corduba, Italica, Hispalis, Gades in the Hispania Baetica, Tarraco, Caesar Augusta, Asturica Augusta, Legio Septima Gemina and Lucus Augusti in the Hispania Tarraconensis were some of the most important cities, linked by a complex network of roads. The construction development includes some monuments of comparable quality to those of the capital, Rome.

=== Constructions ===
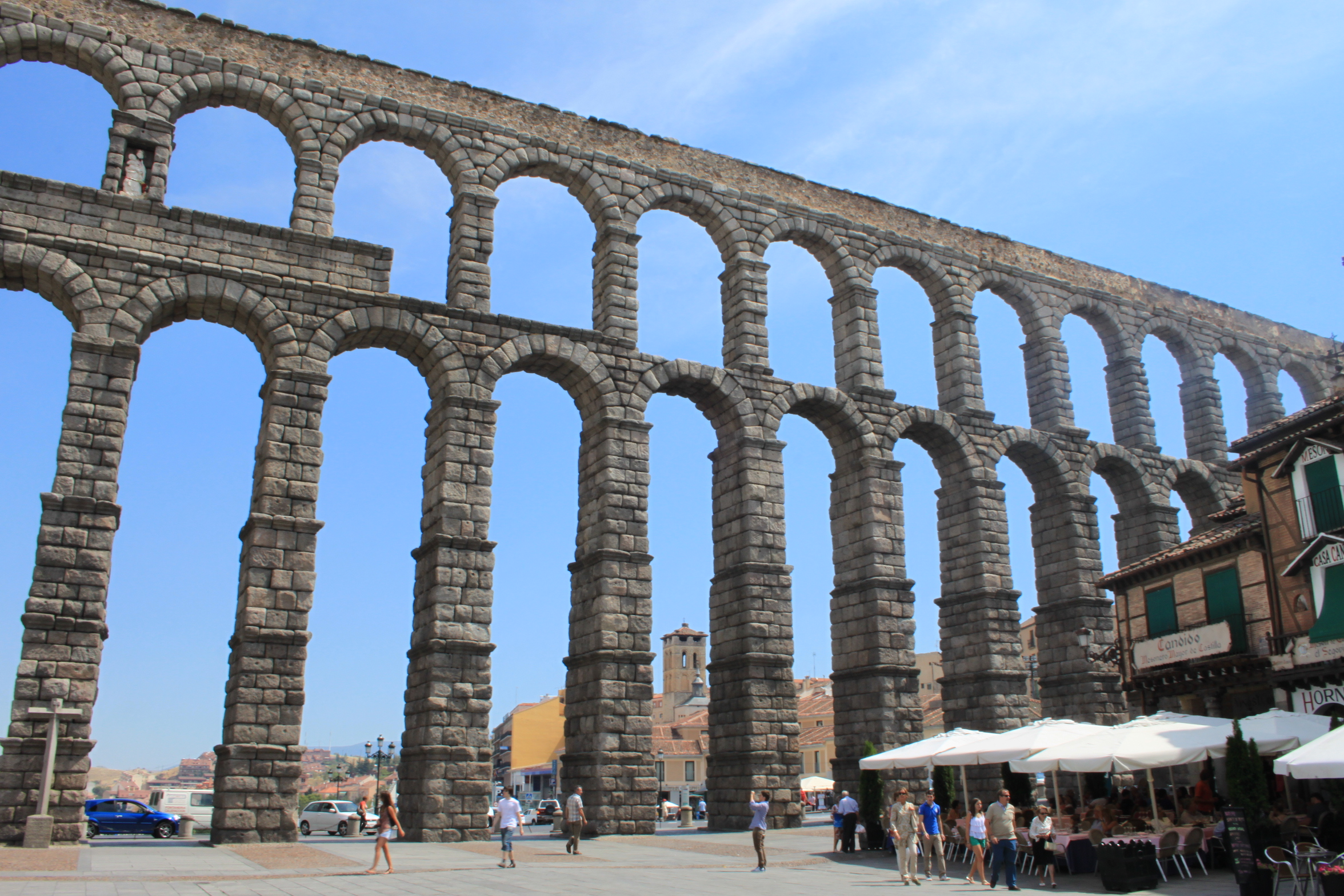
Aqueduct of Segovia, of Domitian, Nerva and Trajan epoque

Roman civil engineering is represented in imposing constructions such as the Aqueduct of Segovia and the Acueducto de los Milagros in Mérida, in bridges like the Alcántara Bridge, Puente Romano over Guadiana River, and the Roman bridge of Córdoba over the Guadalquivir. Civil works were widely developed in Hispania under Emperor Trajan (98-117 AD). Lighthouses like the one still in use Hercules Tower in A Coruña, were also built.

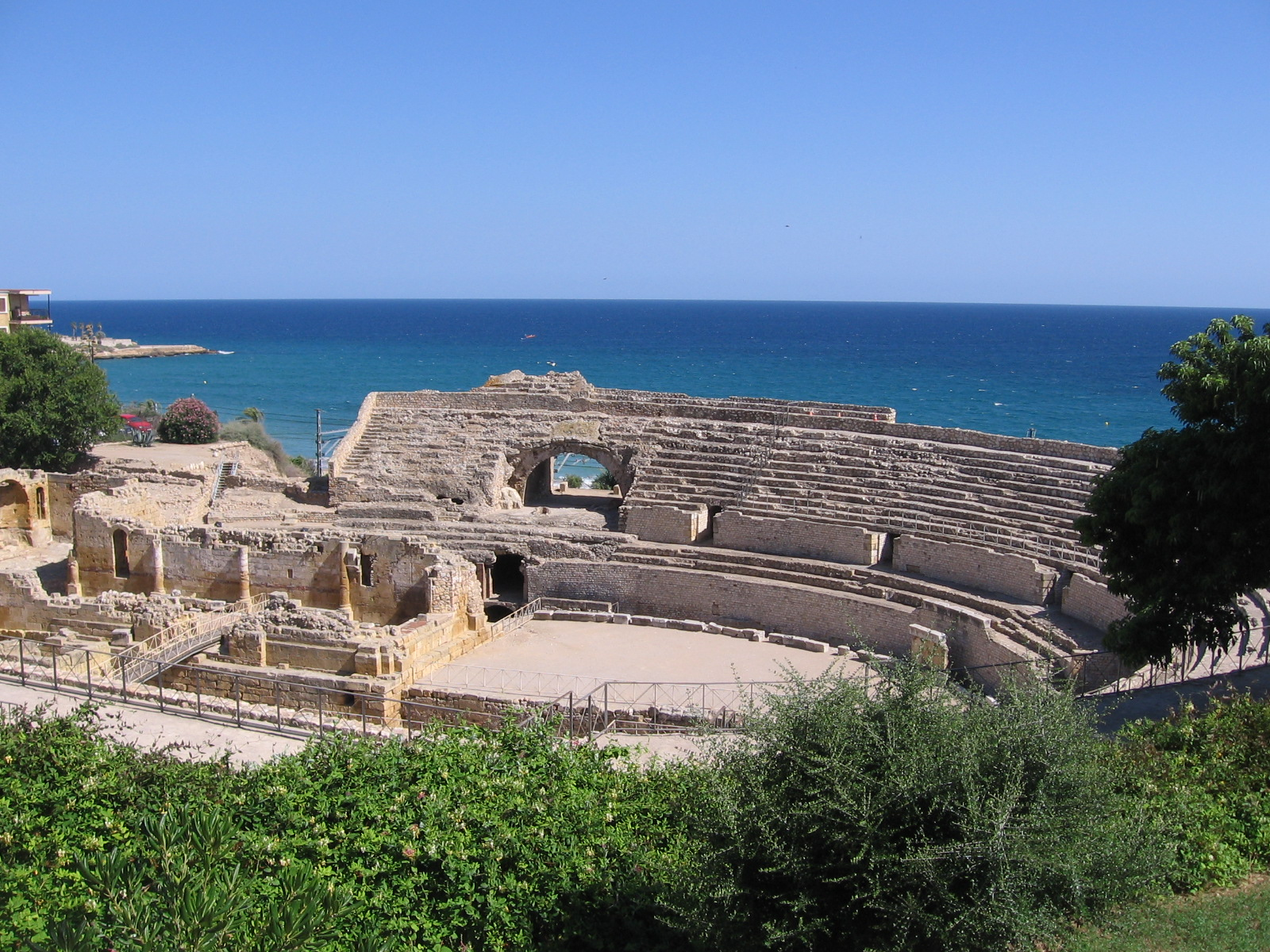
Tarragona Amphitheatre and the Mediterranean Sea

Ludic architecture is represented by such buildings as the theatres of Mérida, Sagunto, Cádiz, Cartagena, and Tarraco, amphitheaters in Mérida, Italica, Tarraco or Segóbriga, and circuses in Mérida, Toledo, and many others.

Religious architecture also spread throughout the Peninsula; examples include the Roman temples of Barcelona, Córdoba, Vic, and Alcántara,

The main funerary monuments are the Torre dels Escipions in Tarraco, the distyle in Zalamea de la Serena, and the Mausoleum of the Atilii in Sádaba, Zaragoza. Roman triumphal arches can be found in Cabanes, Castellón, Medinaceli, and the Arc de Berà near Roda de Berà.

== Pre-Romanesque ==
The term Pre-Romanesque refers to the Christian art after the Classical Age and before Romanesque art and architecture. It covers very heterogeneous artistic displays for they were developed in different centuries and by different cultures. Spanish territory boasts a rich variety of Pre-Romanesque architecture: some of its branches, like the Asturian art reached high levels of refinement for their era and cultural context.

=== Visigothic architecture ===
From the 6th century, it is worth mentioning the remains of the Cabeza de Griego basilica, in Cuenca and the small church of San Cugat del Vallés, in Barcelona. This one, although very deteriorated, clearly shows a single nave plan that ends in an apse. From the following century are those of San Pedro de la Nave, San Juan de Baños, Santa María de Quintanilla de las Viñas, whose layout will later be repeated in other later temples belonging to the "repopulation style" (misnamed "Mozarab»). For the rest, at this time the early Christian tradition is basically followed in religious architecture. The most representative buildings can be related to the following:

Church of San Pedro de la Nave in San Pedro de la Nave-Almendra (Zamora)

Church of Santa Comba de Bande (Orense)

Church of San Juan Bautista de Baños de Cerrato (Palencia)

Crypt of San Antolín in the cathedral of Palencia (Palencia)

Church of San Pedro de la Mata de Sonseca (Toledo)

Chapel of Santa María de Quintanilla de las Viñas (Burgos)

=== Asturian architecture ===
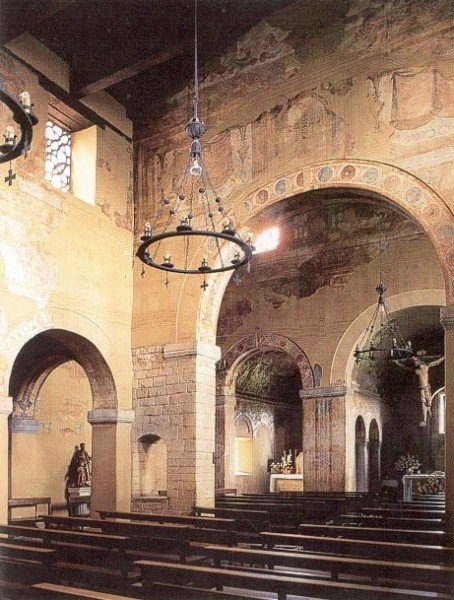
Interior of San Julián de los Prados

The kingdom of Asturias arose in 718, when the Astur tribes, rallied in assembly, decided to appoint Pelayo as their leader. Pelayo joined the local tribes and the refuged Visigoths under his command, with the intention of progressively restoring Gothic Order.

Asturian Pre-Romanesque is a singular feature in all Spain, which, while combining elements from other styles as Visigothic and local traditions, created and developed its own personality and characteristics, reaching a considerable level of refinement, not only as regards construction, but also in terms of aesthetics.

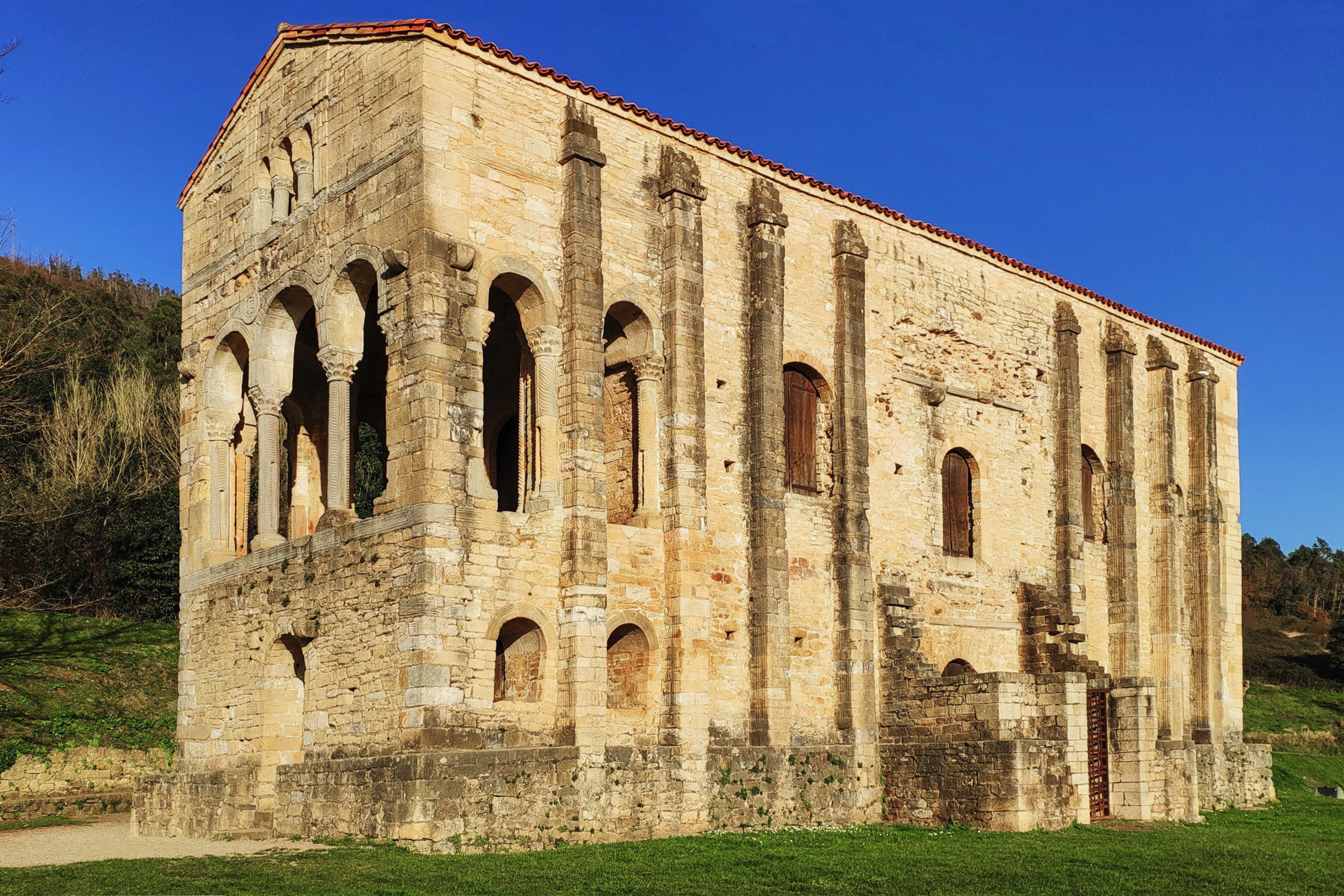
Santa María del Naranco

As regards its evolution, from its appearance, Asturian Pre-Romanesque followed a "stylistic sequence closely associated with the kingdom's political evolution, its stages clearly outlined". It was mainly a court architecture, and five stages are distinguished: a first period (737–791) from the reign of the king Fáfila to Vermudo I, a second stage comprises the reign of Alfonso II (791–842), entering a stage of stylistic definition. These two first stages receive the name of 'Pre-Ramirense'. The most important example is the church San Julián de los Prados in Oviedo, with an interesting volume system and a complex iconographic fresco program, related narrowly to the Roman mural paintings. Lattices and trifoliate windows in the apse appear for the first time at this stage. The Holy Chamber of the Cathedral of Oviedo, San Pedro de Nora and Santa María de Bendones also belong to it.

The third period comprises the reigns of Ramiro I (842–850) and Ordoño I (850–866). It is called 'Ramirense' and is considered the zenith of the style, due to the work of an unknown architect who brought new structural and ornamental achievements like the barrel vault, and the consistent use of transverse arches and buttresses, which made the style rather close to the structural achievements of the Romanesque two centuries later. Some writers have pointed to an unexplained Syrian influence of the rich ornamentation. In that period, most of the masterpieces of the style flourished: the palace pavilions of Naranco Mountain (Santa Maria del Naranco and San Miguel de Lillo), and the church of Santa Cristina de Lena were built in that period.

The fourth period belongs to the reign of Alfonso III (866–910), where a strong Mozarabic influence arrived to Asturian architecture, and the use of the horseshoe arch expanded. A fifth and last period, which coincides with the transfer of the court to León, the disappearance of the kingdom of Asturias, and simultaneously, of Asturian Pre-Romanesque.

=== Mozarabic architecture ===
Mozarabic architecture was carried out by the Mozarabs, Christians who lived in Muslim al-Andalus from the Arab invasion (711) until the end of the 11th century, and who maintained their distinct personality also against the Christians of the northern kingdoms, to them that were emigrating in successive waves or being incorporated during the Reconquista. An example of this architecture is the church of Bobastro, a cave temple found in the place known as Mesas de Villaverde, in Ardales (Málaga), of which only a few ruins remain. Another representative building of this architecture is the church of Santa María de Melque, located in the vicinity of La Puebla de Montalbán (Toledo). Regarding this temple, there is doubt in its stylistic affiliation, since it shares Visigoth features with others more properly Mozarabic, its dating being not clear either. The hermitage of San Baudelio de Berlanga presents an unprecedented typology, including in its rectangular plan a tribune over a small hypostyle hall, in the manner of mosques, and its roof is supported by a single central pillar shaped like a palm tree. Both this pillar and the interior walls are profusely decorated with frescoes depicting hunting scenes and exotic animals. A certain typological connection can be established as an initiatory temple, already in Romanesque times, with the church of Santa María de Eunate and other centralized Templar buildings, such as Torres del Río or Vera Cruz de Segovia.

=== Repopulation architecture ===
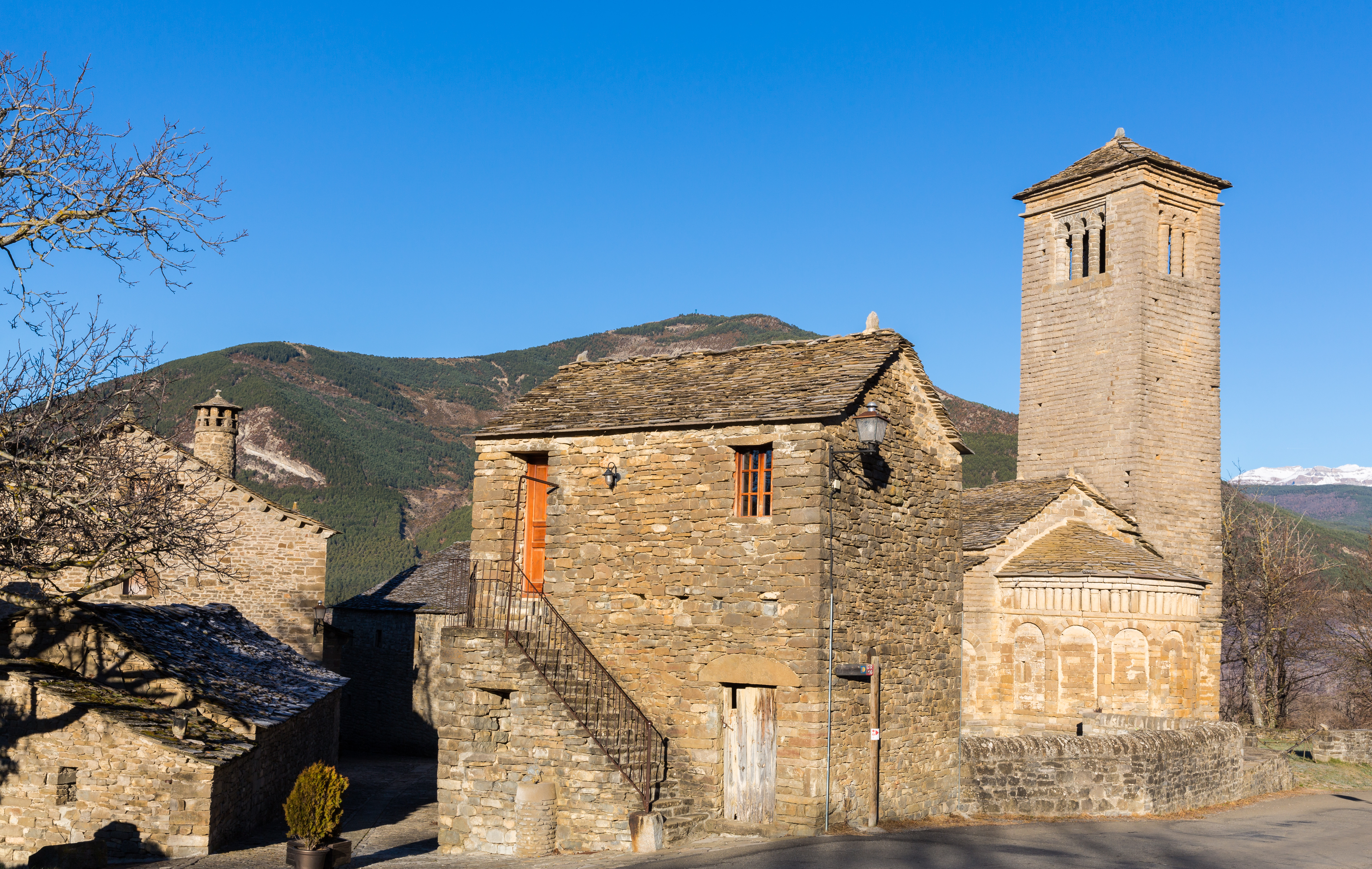
The Church of San Pedro in Lárrede

Between the end of the 9th century and the beginning of the 11th century, a number of churches were built in the Northern Christian kingdoms. They are widely but incorrectly known as Mozarabic architecture. This architecture is a summary of elements of diverse extraction irregularly distributed, of a form that in occasions predominate those of paleo-Christian, Visigothic or Asturian origin, while at other times emphasizes the Muslim impression.

The churches have usually basilica or centralized plans, sometimes with opposing apses. Principal chapels are of rectangular plan on the exterior and ultra-semicircular in the interior. The horseshoe arch of Visigothic evocation is used, somewhat more closed and sloped than the Visigothic as well as the chambranle. Geminated and tripled windows of Asturian tradition and grouped columns forming composite pillars, with Corinthian capital decorated with stylized elements.

Decoration has resemblance to the Visigothic based in volutes, swastikas, and vegetable and animal themes forming projected borders and sobriety of exterior decoration. Some innovations are introduced, as great lobed corbels that support very pronounced eaves. A great command of the technique in construction can be observed, employing ashlar, walls reinforced by exterior buttresses and covering by means of segmented vaults, including by the traditional barrel vaults.

== Al-Andalus ==
=== Emirate and Caliphate of Córdoba ===
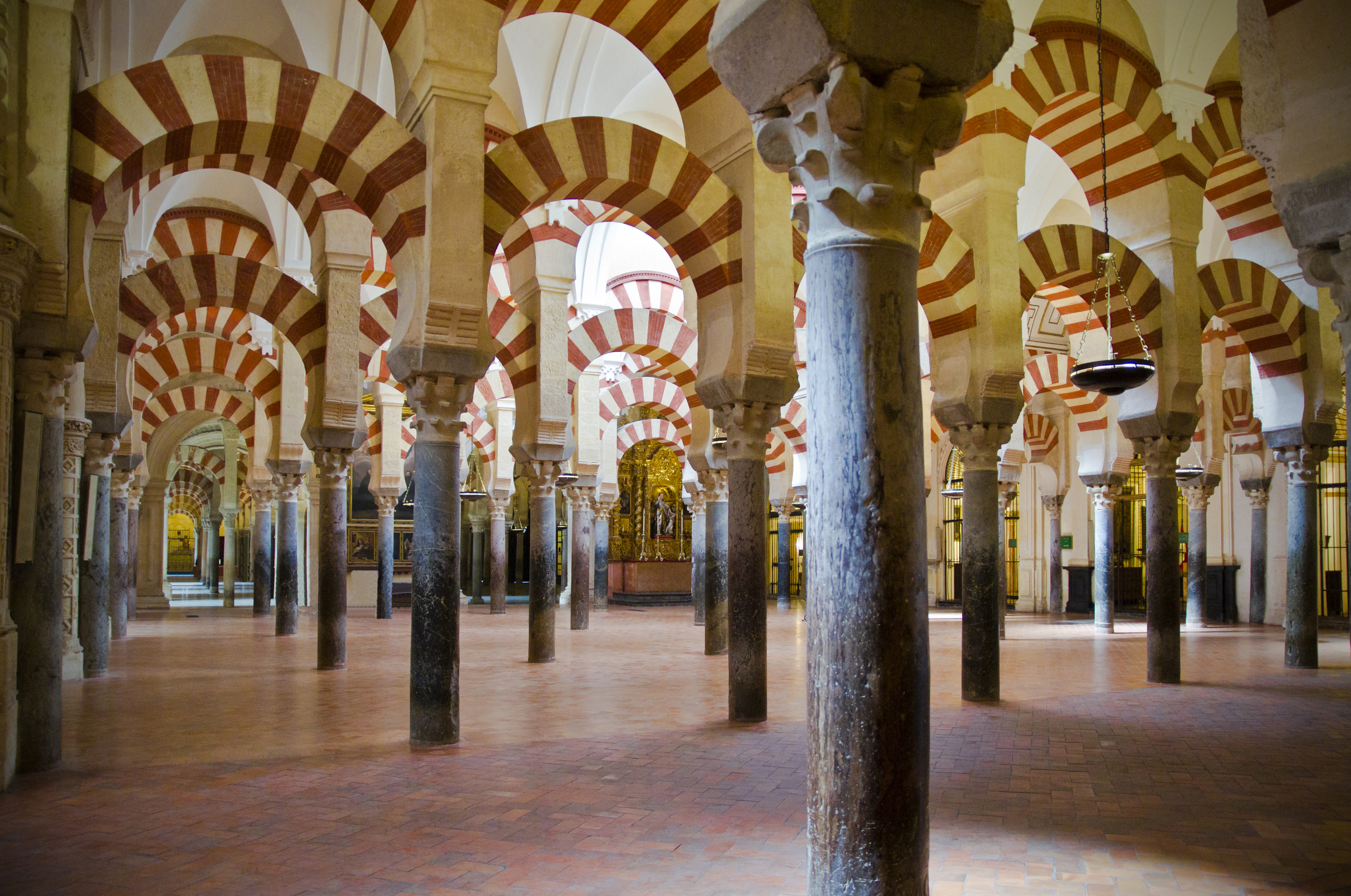
Hypostyle hall with Moorish columns in the Mosque-Cathedral of Córdoba

The Muslim conquest of the former Visigothic Kingdom by the troops of Musa ibn Nusair and Tariq ibn Ziyad, and the overthrowing of the Umayyad dynasty in Damascus, eventually led to the creation of an independent emirate by Abd ar-Rahman I, the only surviving Umayyad prince who escaped from Abbasids, and established his capital city in Córdoba. It served as the capital of Al-Andalus from 750 to 1010, with its political and cultural apogee taking place during the new Caliphate period in the 10th century.

In Cordoba, Abd ar-Rahman I built the Great Mosque in 785. It was expanded multiple times up until the 10th century, and after the Reconquista it was converted into a Catholic cathedral. Its key features include a hypostyle hall with marble columns supporting two-tiered arches, a horseshoe-arch mihrab, ribbed domes, a courtyard (sahn) with gardens, and a minaret (later converted into a bell tower). Abd ar-Rahman III, at the height of his power, began construction of Madinat al-Zahra, a luxurious palace-city to serve as a new capital. It played a major role in formulating a more distinct "caliphal" style which was crucial in the development of subsequent Andalusi architecture. On a smaller scale, the Bab al-Mardum Mosque (later converted to a church) in Toledo is a well-preserved example of a small neighbourhood mosque built at the end of the Caliphate period.

=== The Taifas ===
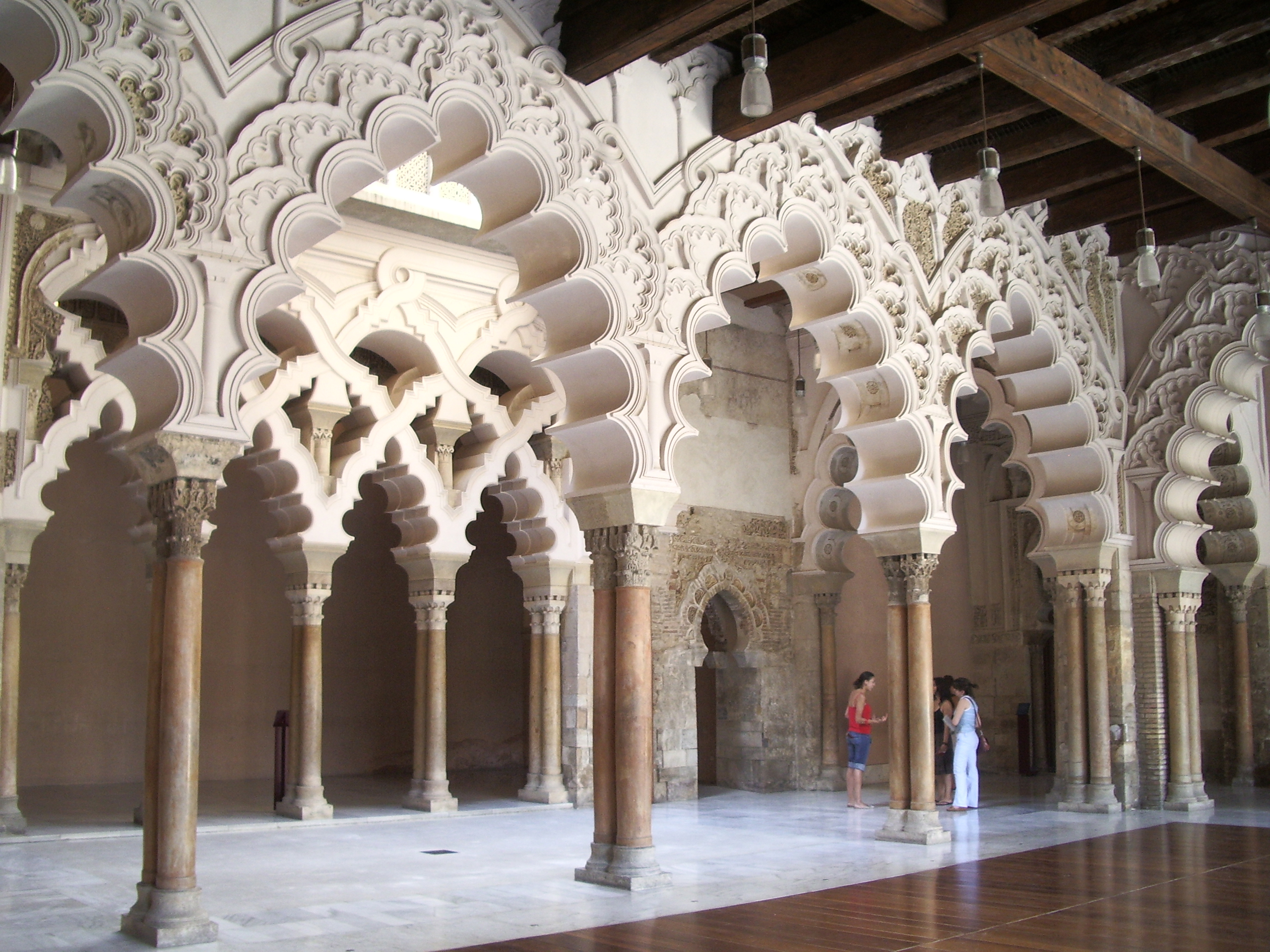
Multifoil arches at the Aljafería Palace, Zaragoza

The Caliphate disappeared and was split into several small kingdoms called taifas. During this period, art and culture continued to flourish despite the political fragmentation of Al-Andalus. The Aljaferia Palace of Zaragoza is the most significant palace preserved from this period, featuring complex ornamental arcades, multifoil and mixtilinear arches, and stucco decoration. In other cities, a number of important palaces or fortresses were begun or expanded by local dynasties such as the Alcazaba of Málaga and the Alcazaba of Almería. Other examples of architecture from around this period include the Bañuelo of Granada, an Islamic bathhouse.

=== Almoravids and Almohads ===
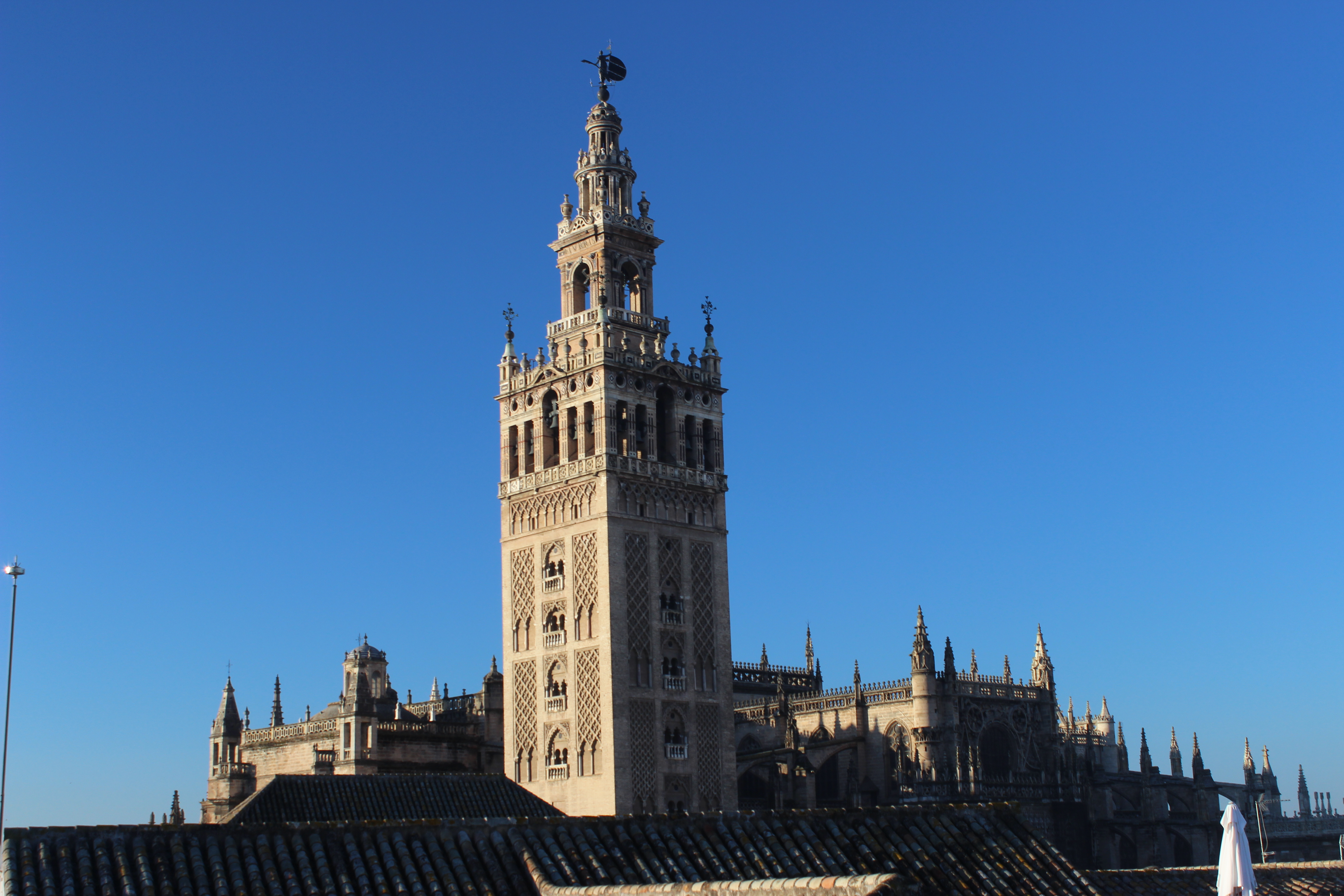
The Giralda, an Almohad minaret later converted into a cathedral bell tower with a Renaissance belfry

The late 11th century saw the significant advance of Christian kingdoms into Muslim al-Andalus, particularly with the fall of Toledo to Alfonso VI of Castile in 1085, and the rise of major Berber empires originating in present-day Morocco. The latter included first the Almoravids (11th–12th centuries) and then the Almohads (12th–13th centuries), both of whom created empires that stretched across large parts of western and northern Africa and took over the remaining Muslim territories of al-Andalus in Europe. This period is considered one of the most formative stages of western Islamic (or "Moorish") architecture, establishing many of the forms and motifs that were refined in subsequent centuries.

Relatively little survives of Almoravid architecture but much more has survived of Almohad architecture. In Seville, the Almohad rulers built a new Great Mosque (later transformed into the Cathedral of Seville), which consisted of a hypostyle prayer hall, a courtyard (now known as the Patio de los Naranjos or Court of Oranges), and a massive minaret tower now known as the Giralda. The minaret was later expanded after being converted into a bell tower for the current cathedral. Other examples of Almohad architecture are found in various fortifications and smaller monuments in southern Spain today, as well as in traces of the former Almohad palace in the Alcazar of Seville. Almohad architecture promoted new forms and decorative designs such as the multifoil arch and the sebka motif, probably influenced by the Caliphate-period architecture of Cordoba.

=== Nasrid Emirate of Granada ===
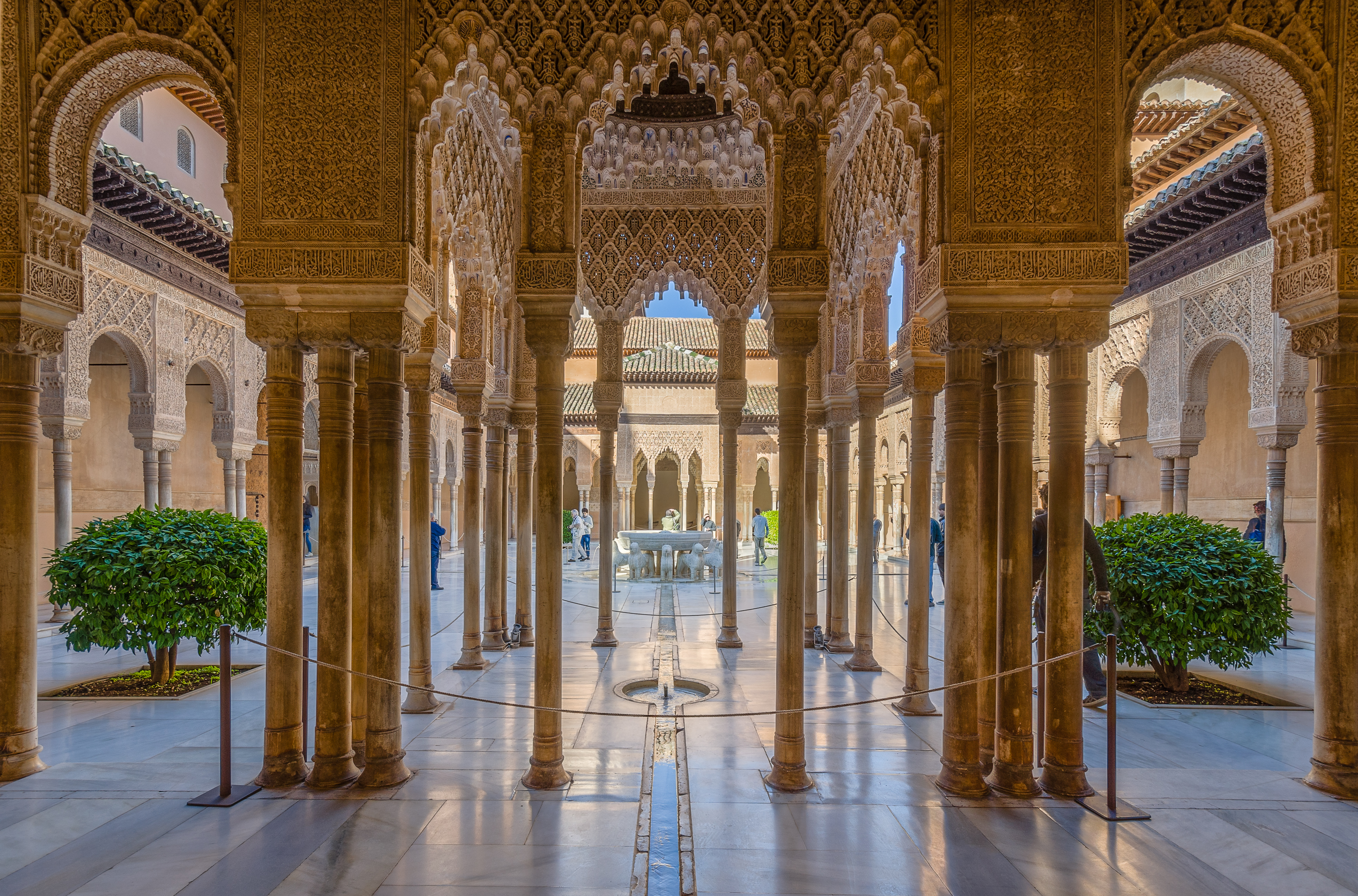
The Alhambra: Court of the Lions

As the Almohad authority retreated from al-Andalus in the early 13th century, the Christian kingdoms of the north advanced again and Muslim al-Andalus was eventually reduced to the much smaller Nasrid Emirate centered in Granada, where much of the Muslim population took refuge. The palaces of the Alhambra and the Generalife in Granada, built under the Nasrid dynasty, are the most iconic monuments of this period and reflect the last great period of art and architecture in al-Andalus before its final end. The Alhambra complex was begun by Ibn al-Ahmar, the first Nasrid emir, and the last major additions were made during the reigns of Yusuf I (1333–1353) and Muhammad V (1353–1391).

Nasrid architecture continued the earlier traditions of Andalusi architecture while also synthesizing them into its own distinctive style, which had many similarities with the architecture of contemporary dynasties in North Africa such as the Marinids. It is characterized by the use of the courtyard as a central space and basic unit around which other halls and rooms were organized. Courtyards typically had water features at their center, such as a reflective pool or a fountain. Decoration was focused on the inside of buildings and was executed primarily with tile mosaics on lower walls and carved stucco on the upper walls. The multiplicity of decoration, the skillful use of light and shadow and the incorporation of water into the architecture are some of the keys features of the style. Geometric patterns, vegetal motifs, and calligraphy were the main types of decorative motifs, typically carved in wood and stucco or crafted with mosaic tilework known as zellij. Additionally, "stalactite"-like sculpting, known as muqarnas, was used for three-dimensional features like vaulted ceilings, particularly during the reign of Muhammad V and after. Epigraphic inscriptions were carved on the walls of many rooms and included allusive poems to the beauty of the spaces.

== Romanesque ==
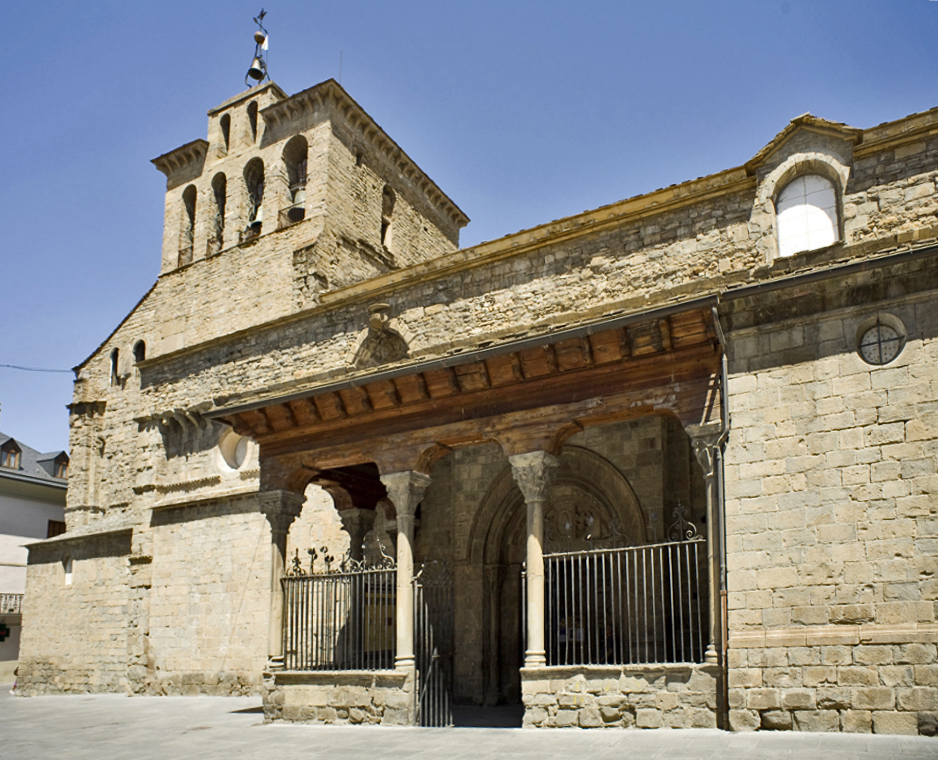
South facade of Jaca Cathedral

Romanesque architecture appeared early in Spain, in the 10th and 11th centuries, in Lérida, Barcelona, Tarragona, Huesca, and in the Pyrenees, simultaneously with its appearance in northern Italy, what is called the First Romanesque or Lombard Romanesque. It is a very simple style, whose characteristics are thick walls, lack of sculpture and the presence of rhythmic ornamental arches, typified by the churches in the Valle de Bohí.

Later Romanesque architecture arrived with the influence of Cluny through the Way of Saint James, that ends in the Cathedral of Santiago de Compostela. The model of the Spanish Romanesque in the 12th century was the Cathedral of Jaca, with its characteristic plan and apse, and its "chessboard" decoration in stripes, called taqueado jaqués. As the Christian Kingdoms advanced southwards, this model spread throughout the reconquered areas with some variations. Spanish Romanesque also shows the influence of Spanish pre-Romanesque styles, mainly Asturian and Mozarabic, but there is also a strong Moorish influence, especially the vaults of Córdoba's Mosque, and the multifoil arches. In the 13th century, some churches alternated in style between Romanesque and Gothic. Aragón, Navarra and Castile-Leon are some of the best areas for Spanish Romanesque architecture.

== Gothic ==
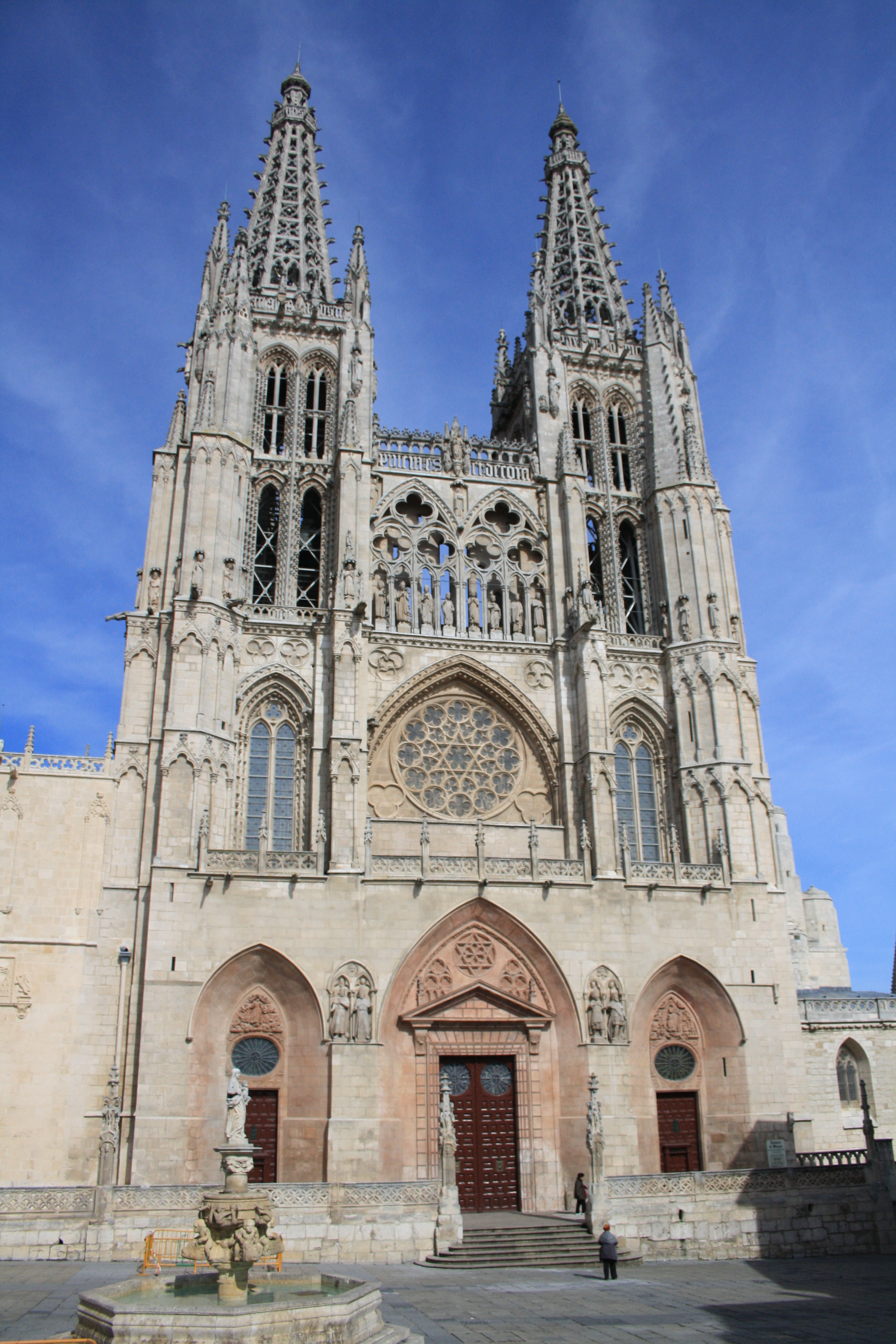
Burgos Cathedral

The Gothic style arrived in Spain in the 12th century. In this time, late Romanesque alternated with a few expressions of pure Gothic architecture like the Cathedral of Ávila. The High Gothic arrived in all its strength through the Way of St. James in the 13th century, with some of the purest Gothic cathedrals, with French and German influences: the cathedrals of Burgos, León and Toledo.

The most important post-13th century Gothic styles in Spain are the Levantine and Isabelline Gothic. Levantine Gothic is characterised by its structural achievements and their unification of space, with masterpieces as La Seu in Palma de Mallorca; the Valencian Gothic style of the Lonja de Valencia (Valencia's silk market), and Santa Maria del Mar (Barcelona).

Isabelline Gothic, created during the times of the Catholic Monarchs, was part of the transition to Renaissance architecture, but also a strong resistance to Italian Renaissance style. Highlights of the style include the Monastery of San Juan de los Reyes in Toledo and the Royal Chapel of Granada.

== Mudéjar ==
Mudéjar art, also known as Mudéjar style, emerged in the Christian kingdoms of the north in the 12th century and spread with the Christian reconquest of the Iberian Peninsula. The reconquest brought Moorish and Jewish craftsmen under Christian rule who then influenced the architecture of the expanding Christian kingdoms. It is not a style of architecture, the term Mudéjar style refers to the application of Moorish and Jewish styles of decoration or materials to whatever Christian architecture existed at the time. This produced Mudéjar-Romanesque, Mudéjar-Gothic and Mudéjar-Renaissance.

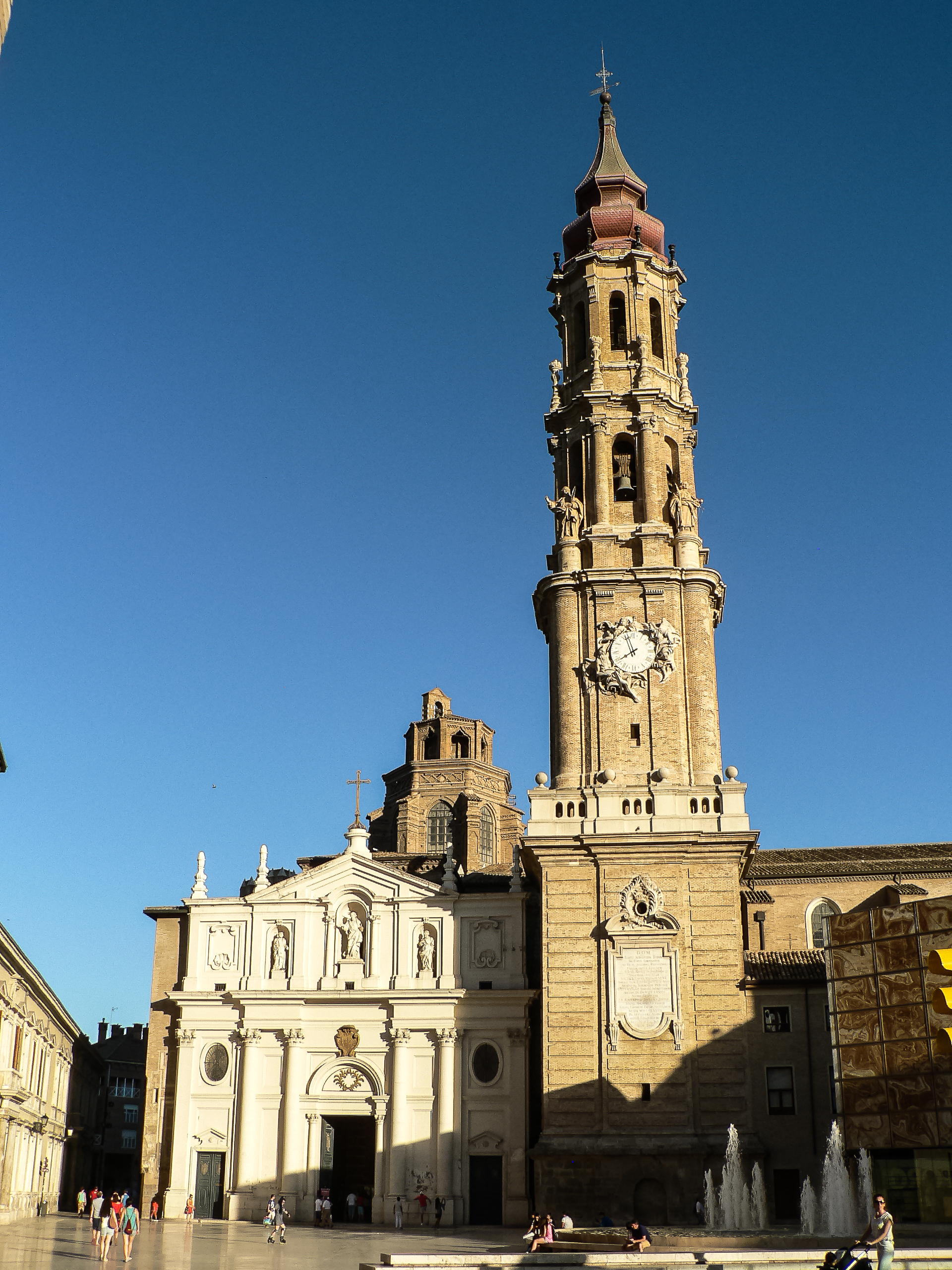
La Seo of Zaragoza

Mudéjar style was highly variable from region to region as different Islamic and Jewish influences were adopted into the Christian architecture of different regions. Mudéjar is characterised by the use of brick as the main building material. The dominant geometrical character, distinctly Islamic, emerged conspicuously in the accessory crafts using cheap materials elaborately worked – tilework, brickwork, wood carving, plaster carving, and ornamental metals. Even after the Muslims and Jews were no longer employed, many of their methods and decorative styles continued to be applied to Spanish architecture.

Mudéjar style was born in the northern town of Sahagún. It spread to the rest of the Kingdom of León; Toledo, Ávila, Segovia, and later was spread to southern Spain by Castile. However, the famous Mudéjar Rooms of the Alcázar of Seville, although often described as Mudéjar style, are actually closely related to the Moorish Nasrid palace architecture of the Alhambra, as the Christian king Pedro of Castile commissioned Moorish architects from Granada to build them. Centers of Mudéjar art are found in other cities Toro, Cuéllar, Arévalo and Madrigal de las Altas Torres. A separate tradition of Mudéjar style became highly developed in Aragon, with three main focuses at Zaragoza, Calatayud, and Teruel, during the 13th, 14th and 15th centuries. In Teruel a wide group of imposing churches and towers were built. Other fine examples of Mudéjar can be found in Casa de Pilatos in Seville, Santa Clara Monastery in Tordesillas, or the churches of Toledo, one of the oldest and most outstanding Mudéjar centers. In Toledo, the synagogues of Santa María la Blanca and El Tránsito (both Mudéjar though not Christian) deserve special mention.

== Renaissance ==
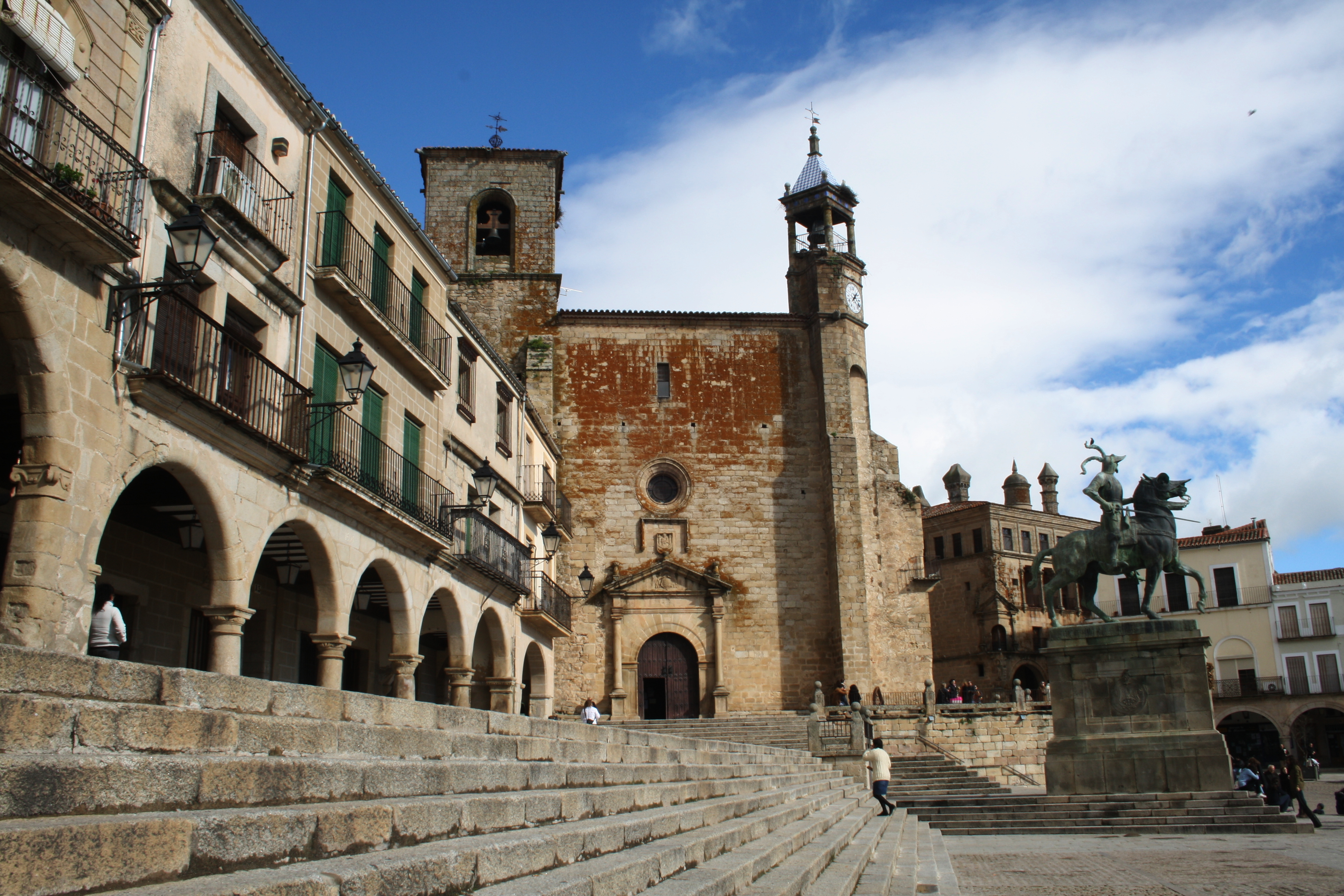
Renaissance Plaza Mayor square of Trujillo

In Spain, Renaissance styles began to be grafted onto Gothic forms in the last decades of the 15th century. The forms that started to spread were made mainly by local architects: that is the cause of the creation of a specifically Spanish Renaissance that brought the influence of southern Italian architecture, sometimes from illuminated books and paintings, mixed with the gothic tradition and local idiosyncrasies. The new style was called Plateresque because of the extremely decorated façades that brought to the mind the decorative motifs of the intricately detailed work of silversmiths, the "plateros". Classical orders and candelabra motifs (a candelieri) were combined freely into symmetrical wholes.

In that scenery, the Palace of Charles V by Pedro Machuca in Granada was an unexpected achievement in the most advanced Renaissance of the moment. The palace can be defined as an anticipation of the Mannerism, due to its command of classical language and its breakthrough aesthetic achievements. It was constructed before the main works of Michelangelo and Palladio. Its influence was very limited and poorly understood, the Plateresque forms prevailed in the general panorama.

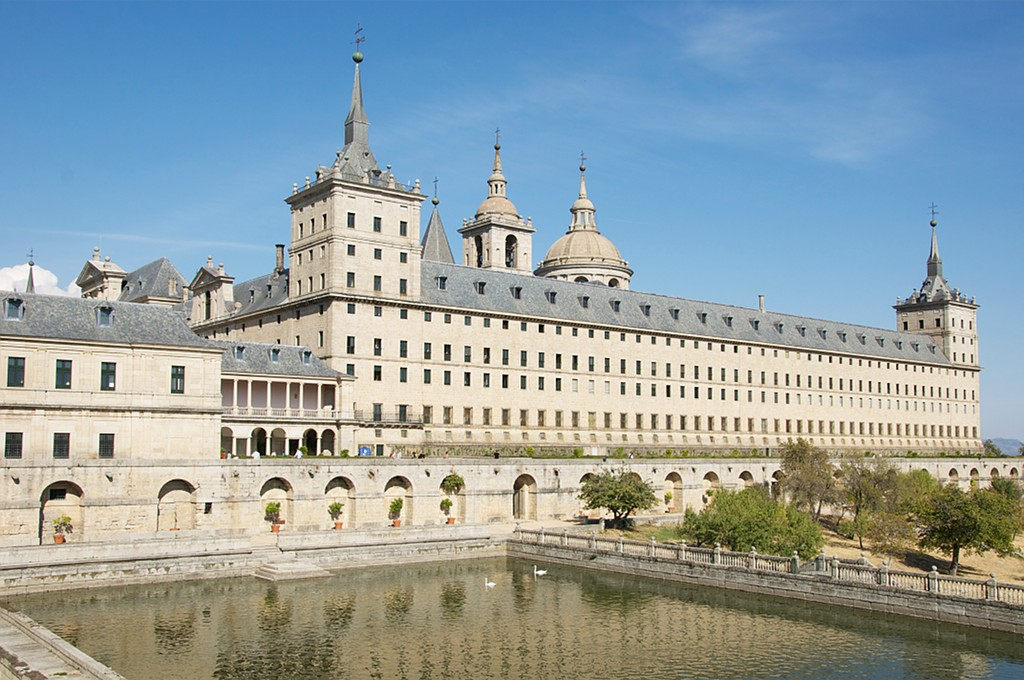
El Escorial

As decades passed, the Gothic influence disappeared and the research of an orthodox classicism reached high levels. Although Plateresque is a commonly used term to define most of the architectural production of the late 15th and first half of 16th century, some architects acquired a more sober personal style, like Diego Siloe and Rodrigo Gil de Hontañón. Examples include the façades of the University of Salamanca and of the Convent of San Marcos in León.

The highlight of Spanish Renaissance is represented by the Royal Monastery of El Escorial, built by Juan Bautista de Toledo and Juan de Herrera, where a much closer adherence to the art of ancient Rome was overpassed by an extremely sober style. The influence from Flanders roofs, the symbolism of the scarce decoration and the precise cut of the granite established the basis for a new style, the Herrerian. A disciple of Herrera, Juan Bautista Villalpando was influential for interpreting the recently revived text of Vitruvius to suggest the origin of the classical orders in Solomon's Temple.

== Baroque ==
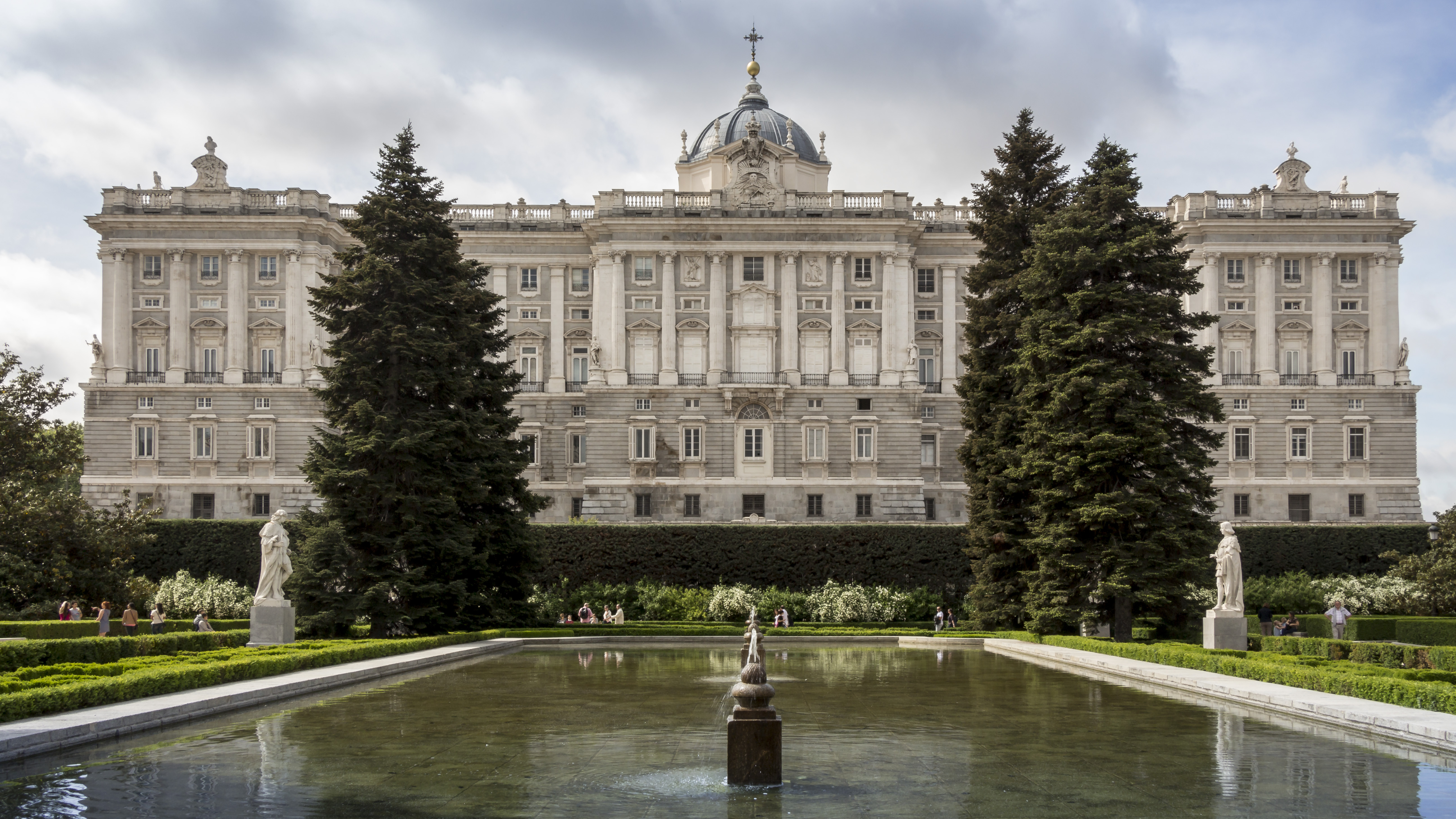
North facade of the Royal Palace and view of the Sabatini Gardens, Madrid, Spain

As Italian Baroque influences grew, they gradually superseded in popularity the restrained classicizing approach of Juan de Herrera, which had been in vogue since the late sixteenth century. As early as 1667, the façades of Granada Cathedral (by Alonso Cano) and Jaén Cathedral (by Eufrasio López de Rojas) suggest the artists' fluency in interpreting traditional motifs of Spanish cathedral architecture in the Baroque aesthetic idiom.

Vernacular Baroque with its roots still in the Herrerian style and in traditional brick construction was developed in Madrid throughout the 17th century. Examples include Plaza Mayor and the Major House.

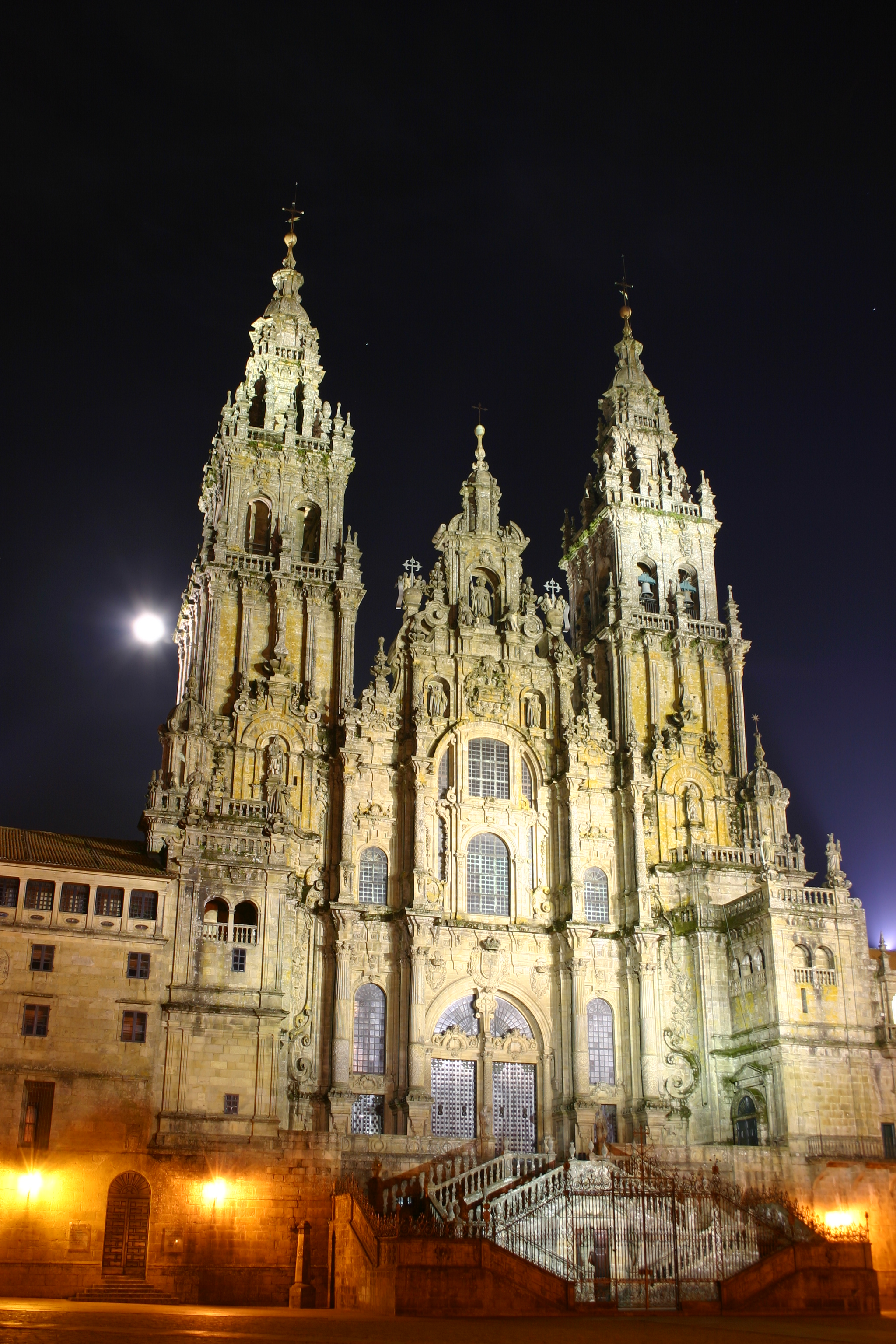
Obradoiro façade of the Cathedral of Santiago de Compostela

In contrast to the art of Northern Europe, the Spanish art of the period appealed to the emotions rather than seeking to please the intellect. The Churriguera family, which specialized in designing altars and retables, revolted against the sobriety of the Herrerian classicism and promoted an intricate, exaggerated, almost capricious style of surface decoration known as the Churrigueresque. Within half a century, they transformed Salamanca into an exemplary Churrigueresque city.

The evolution of the style passed through three phases. Between 1680 and 1720, the Churriguera popularized Guarini's blend of Solomonic columns and Composite order, known as the "supreme order". Between 1720 and 1760, the Churrigueresque column, or estipite, in the shape of an inverted cone or obelisk, was established as a central element of ornamental decoration. The years from 1760 to 1780 saw a gradual shift of interest away from twisted movement and excessive ornamentation toward a neoclassical balance and sobriety.

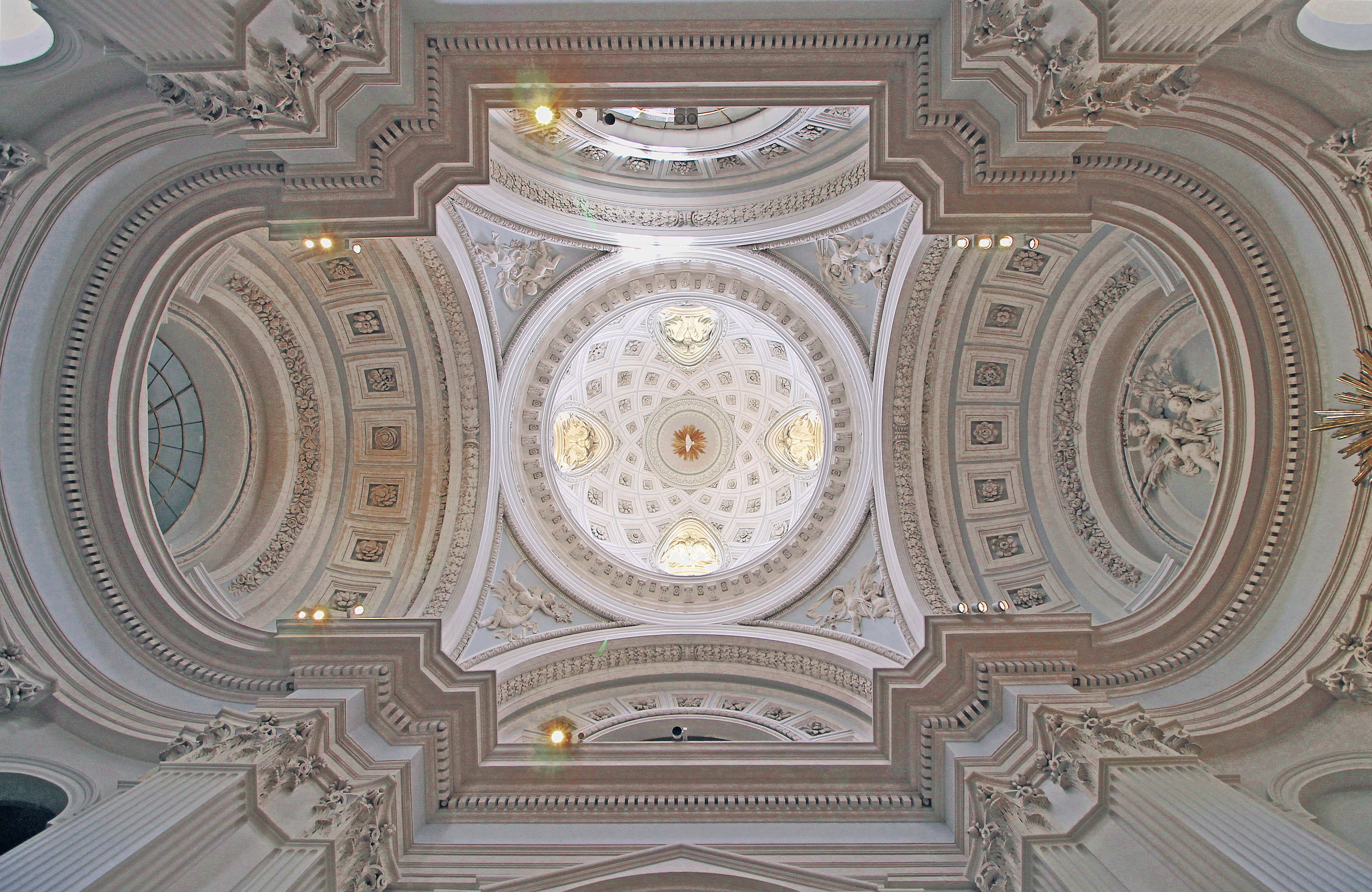
Dome of the chapel of the Palace of Infante don Luis in Boadilla del Monte (Community of Madrid, Spain)

Two of the most eye-catching creations of Spanish Baroque are the energetic façades of the University of Valladolid (Diego Tomé, 1719) and Hospicio de San Fernando in Madrid (Pedro de Ribera, 1722), whose curvilinear extravagance seems to herald Antonio Gaudí and Art Nouveau. In this case as in many others, the design involves a play of tectonic and decorative elements with little relation to structure and function. However, Churrigueresque Baroque offered some of the most impressive combinations of space and light with buildings like Granada Charterhouse, considered to be the apotheosis of Churrigueresque style applied to interior spaces, or El Transparente of the Cathedral of Toledo by Narciso Tomé, where sculpture and architecture are integrated to achieve notable light dramatic effects.

The Royal Palace of Madrid and the interventions of Paseo del Prado (Salón del Prado and Alcalá Doorgate) in the same city, deserve special mention. They were constructed in a sober Baroque international style, often mistaken for neoclassical, by the Bourbon kings Philip V and Charles III. The Royal Palaces of La Granja de San Ildefonso, in Segovia, and Aranjuez, in Madrid, are good examples of Baroque integration of architecture and gardening, with noticeable French influence (La Granja is known as the Spanish Versailles), but with local spatial conceptions which in some ways display the heritage of the Moorish occupation.

Rococo was first introduced to Spain in the (Cathedral of Murcia, west façade, 1733). The greatest practitioner of the Spanish Rococo style was a native master, Ventura Rodríguez, responsible for the dazzling interior of the Basilica of Our Lady of the Pillar in Zaragoza (1750).

== Neoclassical ==
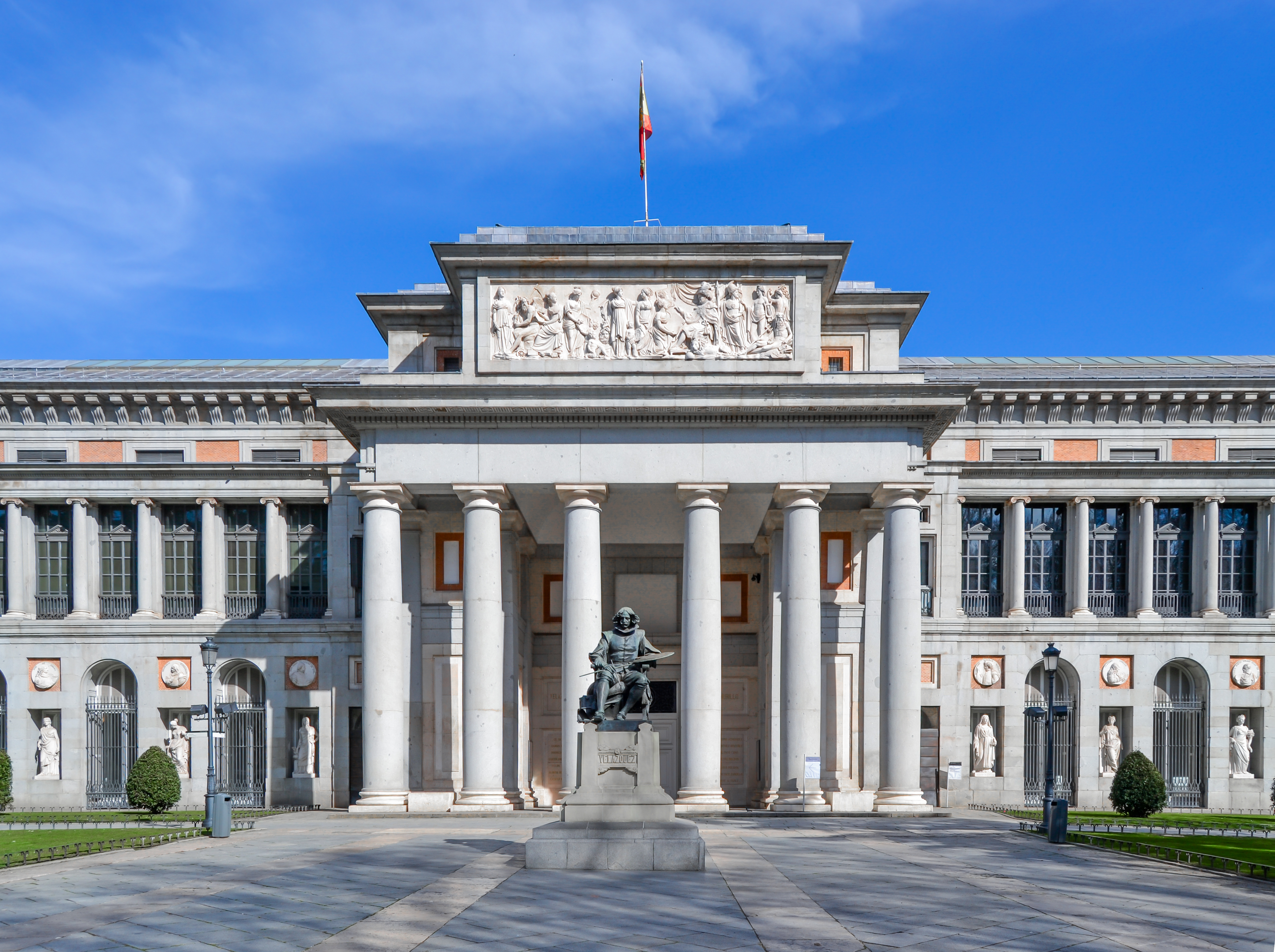
Prado Museum in Madrid, by Juan de Villanueva

The extremely intellectual postulates of Neoclassicism succeeded in Spain less than the much more expressive of Baroque. Spanish Neoclassicism was spread by the Royal Academy of Fine Arts of San Fernando, founded in 1752. The main figure was Juan de Villanueva, who adapted Edmund Burke's achievements about the sublime and the beauty to the requirements of Spanish clime and history. He built the Prado Museum that combined three programs - an academy, an auditorium and a museum - in one building with three separated entrances. This was part of the ambitious program of Charles III, who intended to make Madrid the Capital of Art and Science. Very close to the museum, Villanueva built the Royal Observatory of Madrid. He also designed several summer houses for the kings in El Escorial and Aranjuez and reconstructed the Plaza Mayor of Madrid, among other important works. Villanuevas´ pupils Antonio López Aguado and Isidro González Velázquez expanded the Neoclassical style in Spain.

== Spanish Viceroyal architecture in America and Pacific ==
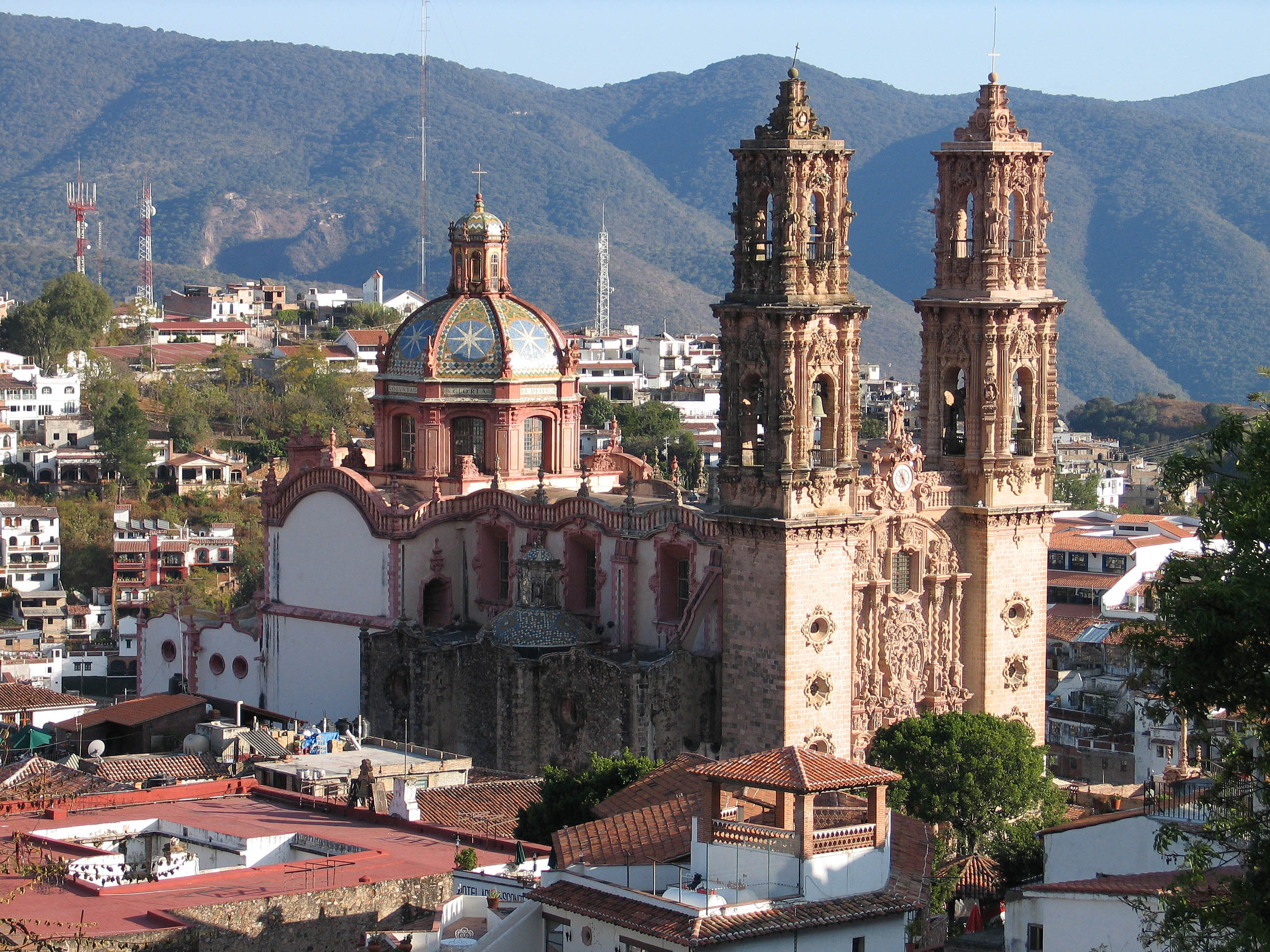
The Santa Prisca Church in Taxco, Mexico, is an example of New Spanish Churrigueresque

The combination of the Native American and Moorish decorative influences with an extremely expressive interpretation of the Churrigueresque idiom may account for the full-bodied and varied character of the Baroque in the American kingdoms and provinces of the Spanish Monarchy. Even more than its Spanish counterpart, American Baroque developed as a style of stucco decoration. Twin-towered façades of many American cathedrals of the seventeenth century had Renaissance roots and the full-fledged Baroque did not appear until 1664, when the Jesuit shrine on Plaza de Armas in Cusco was built.

In the Viceroyalty of Peru, the Andean Baroque was particularly lush, as evidenced by the monastery of San Francisco in Lima (1673), which has a dark intricate façade sandwiched between the twin towers of local yellow stone. While the rural Baroque of the Jesuite missions (estancias) in Córdoba, Argentina, followed the model of Il Gesù, provincial "mestizo" (crossbred) styles emerged in Arequipa, Potosí and La Paz. In the eighteenth century, the architects of the region turned for inspiration to the Mudéjar art of medieval Spain. The late Baroque type of Peruvian façade first appears in the Church of Our Lady of La Merced, Lima (1697–1704). Similarly, the Church of La Compañia, Quito (1722–65) suggests a carved altarpiece with its richly sculpted façade and a surfeit of the Solomonic column.

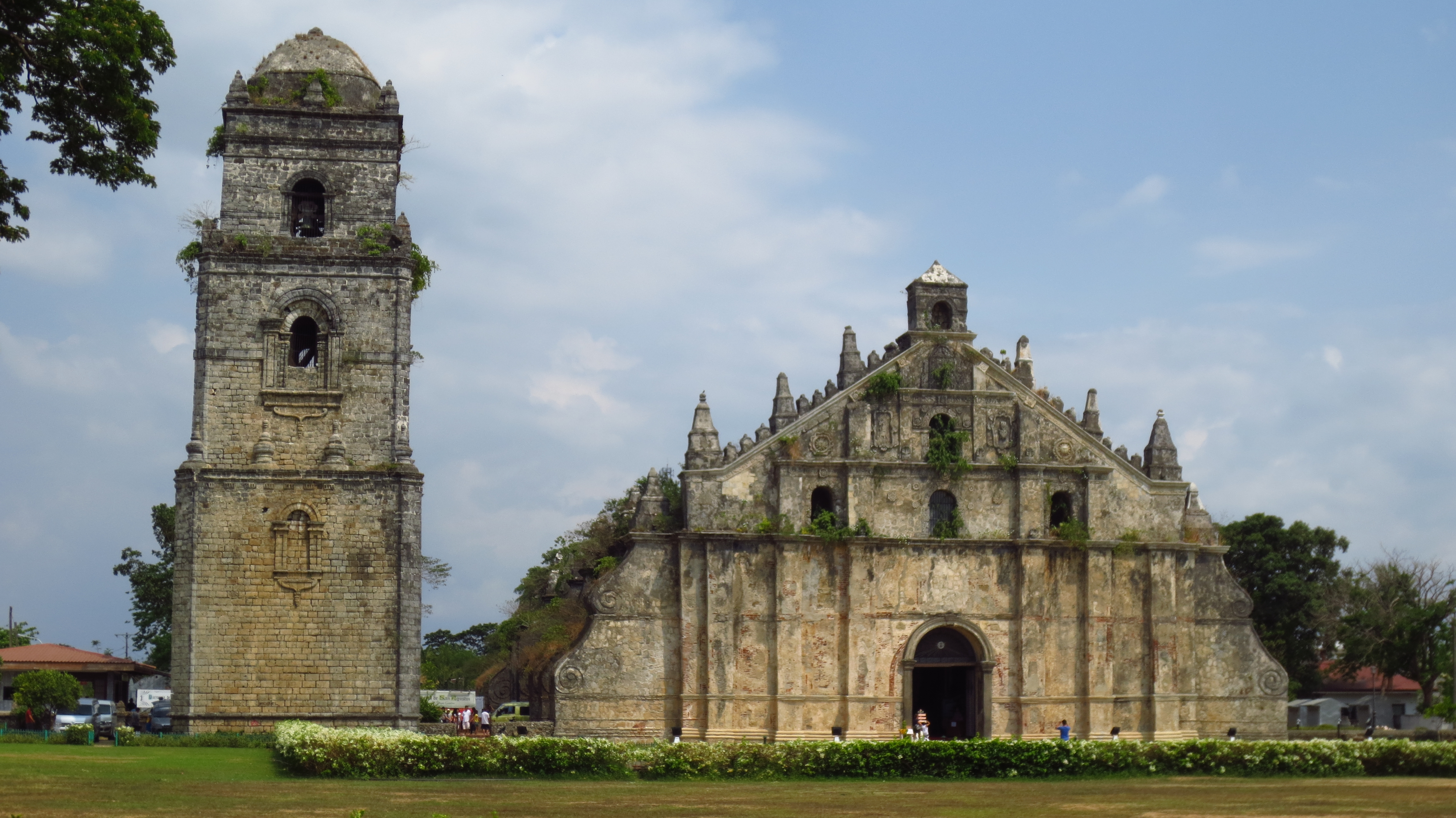
The Paoay Church in Paoay, Philippines, is an example of Earthquake Baroque architecture.

To the north, by 18th-century the richest Viceroyalty of New Spain – from nowadays Costa Rica to Mexico – produced some fantastically extravagant and visually frenetic architecture known as New Spanish Churrigueresque. This ultra-Baroque approach culminates in the works of Lorenzo Rodríguez, whose masterpiece is the Sagrario Metropolitano in Mexico City (1749–69). Other fine examples of the style may be found in the remote silver-mining towns. For instance, the Sanctuary at Ocotlán (begun in 1745) is a top-notch Baroque cathedral surfaced in bright red tiles, which contrast delightfully with a plethora of compressed ornament lavishly applied to the main entrance and the slender flanking towers.

The true capital of New Spanish Baroque is Puebla, Mexico, where a ready supply of hand-painted glazed tiles (talavera) and vernacular gray stone led to its evolving further into a personalised and highly localised art form with a pronounced Indian taste.

Spanish Chinese influence exclusive to Spanish East Indies was born when Spain invaded what's now the Philippines, in South East Asia. Pre-Spanish Philippine architecture was based on the native nipa hut, which corresponds to the tropical climate, stormy seasons, and earthquake prone environment of the archipelago. This native architecture was combined with the influences of the Spanish invaders and Chinese traders to form a hybrid Austronesian, Chinese and Spanish architecture.

== 19th century ==
=== Eclecticism and Regionalism ===
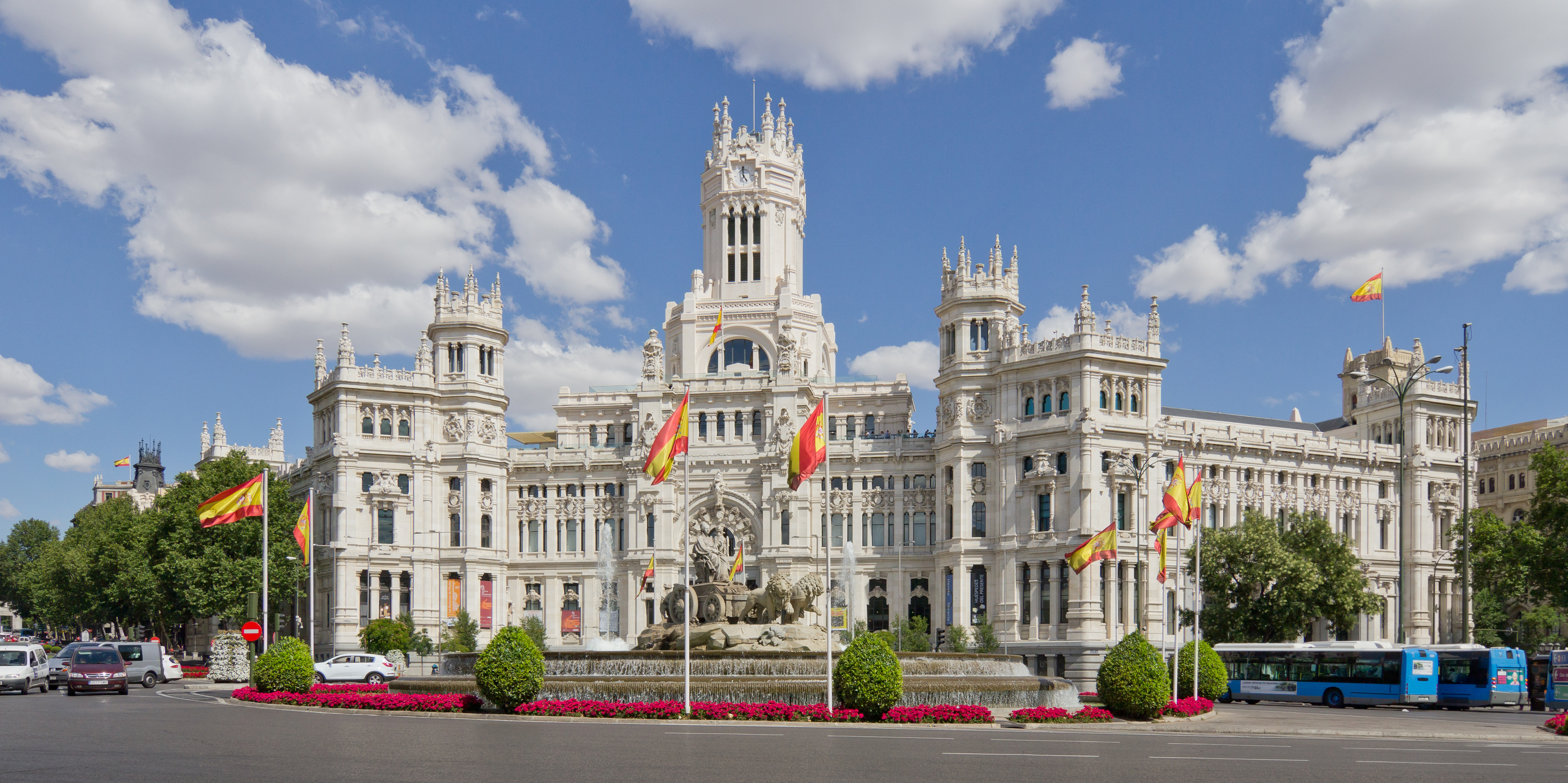
The Palace of Communications in Madrid

During the second half of the 19th century, the Revivalism dominated the scene in Europe, and so happened in Spain. Architects focused in choosing which was the most appropriated historical style for each use or occasion. Neoclassicism opened the gates to Neo-Byzantine, Neo-Gothic, Neo-Renaissance, Neo–Baroque, Egyptian Revival, Neo-Mudéjar, and so on.

This led to a particular new style made of the mixture of several old styles in the same construction: the Eclecticism. It is difficult to trace a clear line to separate styles as Modernisme, Industrial iron architecture and Eclecticism, as very often architects took some features of several of them for their works. This is the case of Antonio Palacios, co-designer with Joaquín Otamendi of the Palace of Communications of Madrid, inaugurated in 1909. Other works of Palacios include the Círculo de Bellas Artes, the Río de la Plata Bank, the Hospital of Maudes, all of them in Madrid.

In the first half of the 20th century, another wave of revivals emerged, mainly after the Iberoamerican Exhibition of Seville in 1929: the Regionalism. Features of the different regional vernacular architectures took then the protagonism.

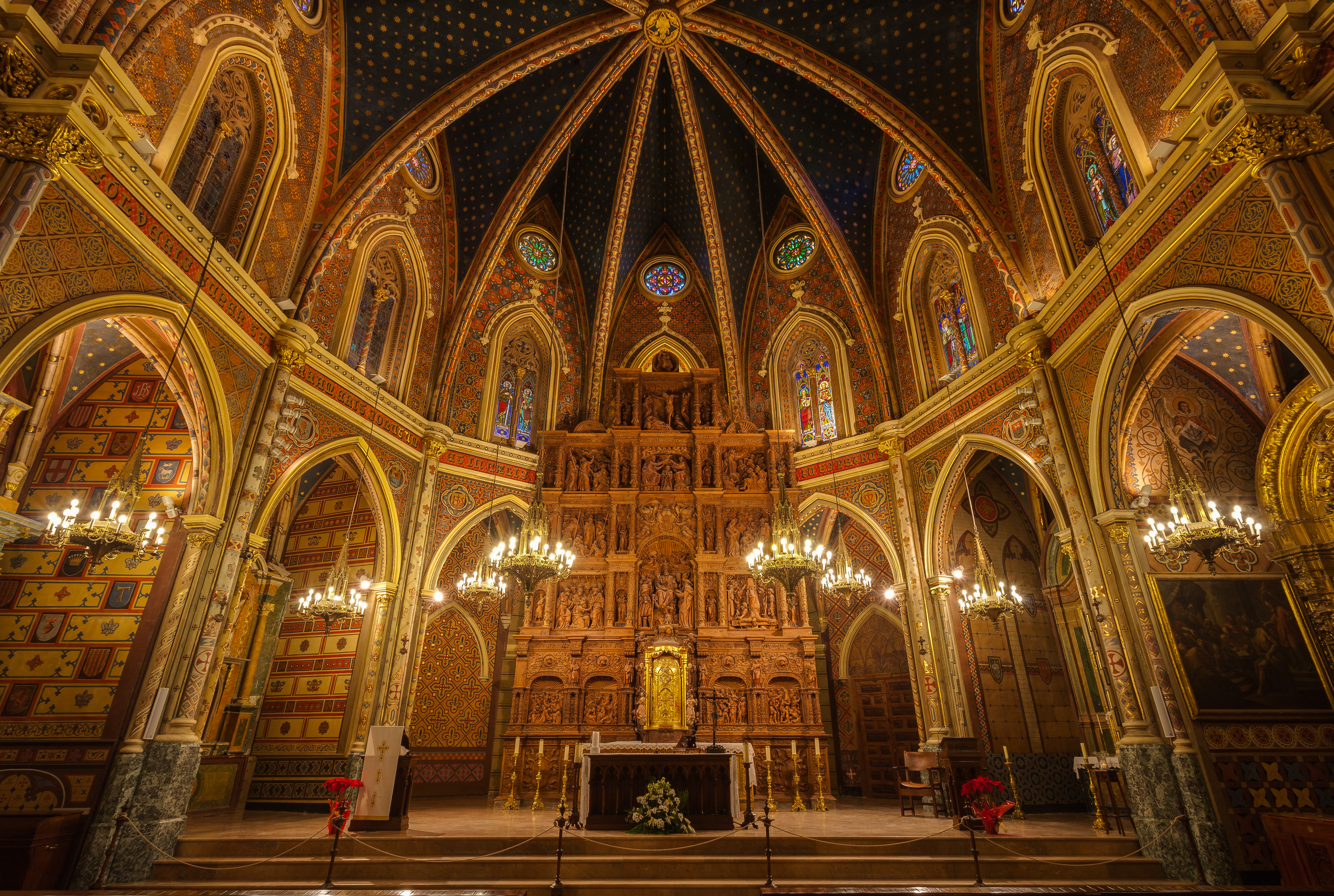
Interior of St. Peter's Church, Teruel, Aragón. The 14th century Mudéjar-Gothic church was declared World Heritage in 1986. Neo-Mudejar decoration was added in 1896–1902.

=== Neo-Mudéjar ===
In the late 19th century a new architectural movement emerged in Madrid as a revival of the Mudéjar architecture. The Neo-Mudéjar soon spread to other regions of the country. Architects such as Emilio Rodríguez Ayuso perceived the Mudéjar as a characteristic and exclusive Spanish style. They started to construct buildings using some of the features of the ancient style, as horseshoe arches and the use of the abstract shaped brick ornamentations for the façades. It became a popular style for bull rings and for other public constructions, but also for housing, due to its cheap materials, mainly brick for exteriors.

The Neo-Mudéjar was often combined with Neo-Gothic features.

=== Architecture of glass and iron ===
During the Industrial Revolution, the new use of iron and glass as the main materials for building construction was, as in the rest of Europe, applied specially in train stations, winterhouses, industrial buildings and pavilions for exhibitions. The architects who most developed this style in Spain were Ricardo Velázquez Bosco and Alberto del Palacio, although glass for façades and iron for structures were used to some extent by other architects, such as Antonio Palacios, Enrique María Repullés y Vargas or Narciso Pascual y Colomer. A notable example is the Palacio de Cristal del Retiro in Madrid.

== 20th century ==
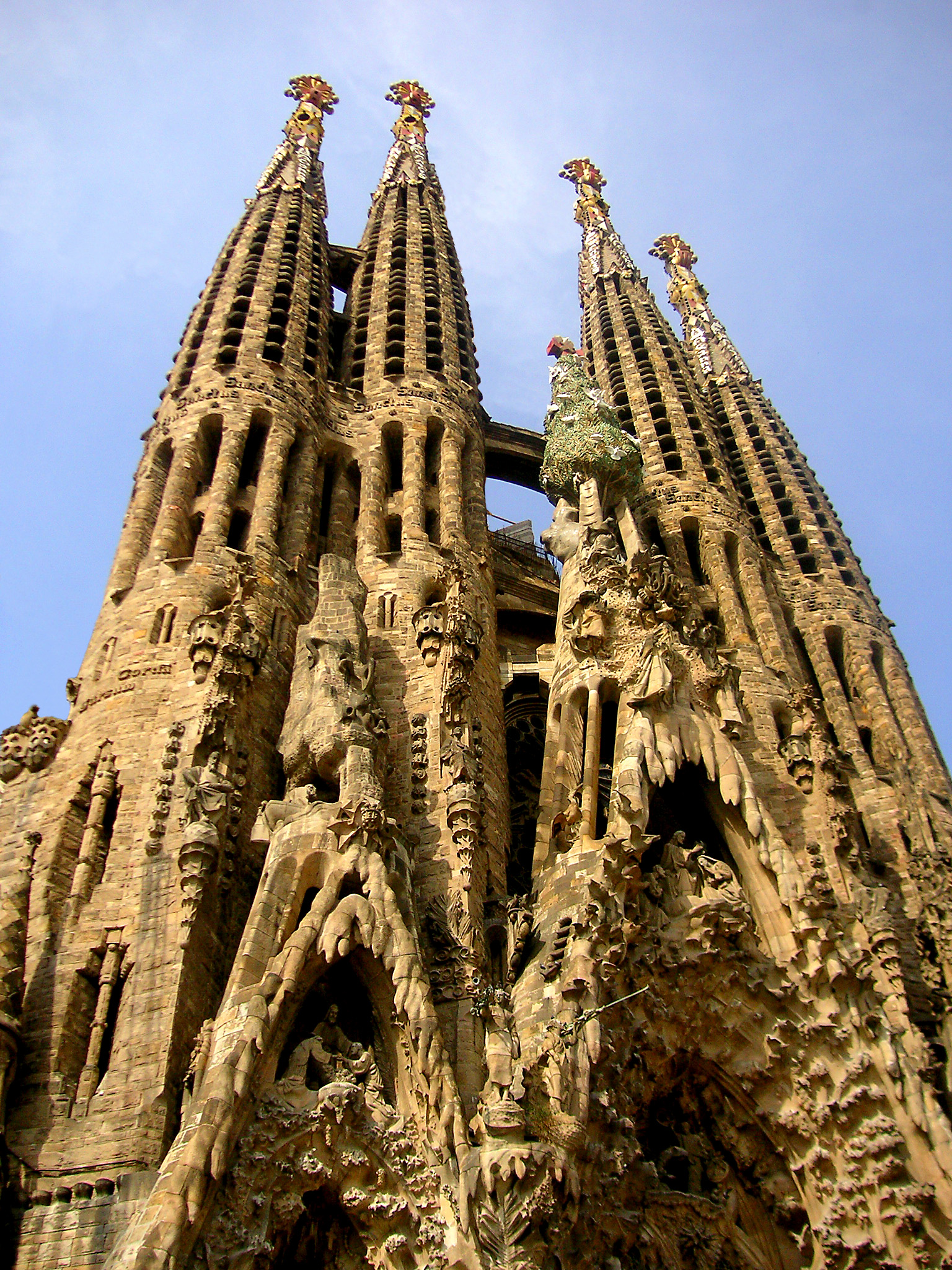
Basilica Sagrada Família in Barcelona

=== Catalan Modernisme ===
When the city of Barcelona was allowed to expand beyond its historic limits in the late 19th century, the resulting Eixample district by Ildefons Cerdà became the site of a burst of architectural energy known as the Modernisme movement. Modernisme broke with past styles and used organic forms for its inspiration in the same way as the concurrent Art Nouveau and Jugendstil movements in the rest of Europe. Most famous among the architects represented there is Antoni Gaudí, whose works in Barcelona and spread in other parts of Catalonia, León and Cantabria, mixing traditional architectural styles with the new, were a precursor to modern architecture. Perhaps the most famous example of his work is the still-unfinished Sagrada Família basilica, the largest building in the Eixample.

Other notable Catalan architects of that period include Lluís Domènech i Montaner and Josep Puig i Cadafalch, although their approach to Modernisme was largely more linked to Neo-Gothic shapes.

=== Contemporary architecture ===
The creation in 1928 of the GATCPAC group in Barcelona, followed by the foundation of GATEPAC (1930) by architects mainly from Zaragoza, Madrid, San Sebastián and Bilbao, established two groups of young architects practicing Modern architecture in Spain. Josep Lluis Sert, Fernando García Mercadal, Jose María de Aizpurúa and Joaquín Labayen among others were organised in three regional groups. Other architects explored the Modern style with their personal views: Casto Fernández Shaw with his visionary work, most of it on paper, Josep Antoni Coderch, with his integration of the Mediterranean housing and the new style concepts or Luis Gutiérrez Soto, mostly influenced by the Expressionist tendencies.

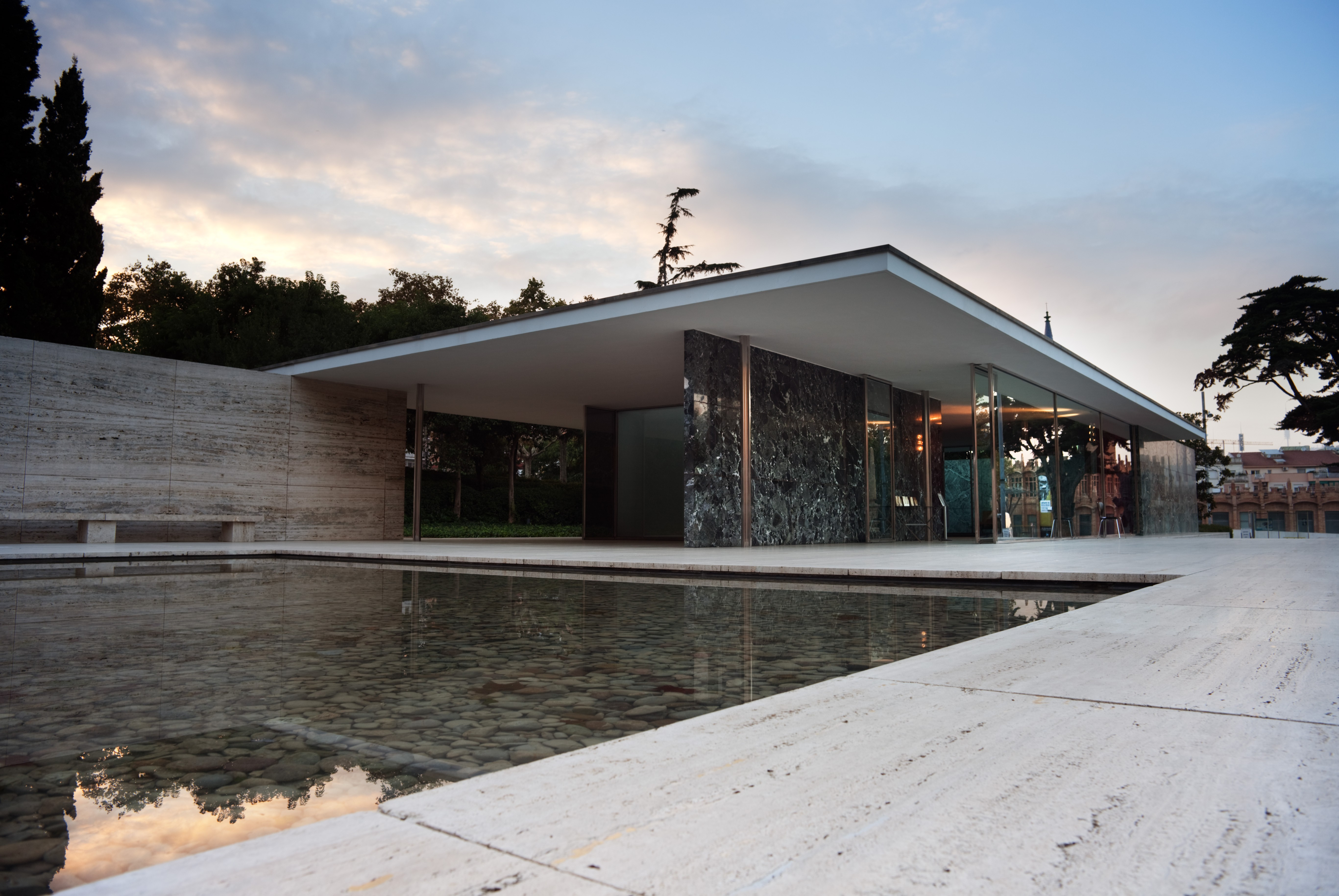
The Barcelona Pavilion designed by Ludwig Mies van der Rohe, 1929

At the 1929 Barcelona International Exposition, the German pavilion designed by Ludwig Mies van der Rohe became an instant icon, amalgamating Rohe's minimalism and notions of truth to materials with a De Stijl influenced treatment of planes in space. The large overhanging roof famously 'hovers' apparently unsupported.

During and after the Spanish Civil War and World War II, Spain found herself both politically and economically isolated. The consequent effect of which, in tandem with Franco's preference for "a deadening, nationalistic sort of classical kitsch", was to largely suppress progressive modern architecture in Spain. Nevertheless, some architects were able to reconcile advances in construction with official approval, notably in the prolific output of Gutiérrez Soto whose interest in topology and rational distribution of space effectively alternated historical revivals and rationalist imagery with ease. Luis Moya Blanco's achievements in the construction with brick vaults deserve also a mention. His interest in traditional brick construction led him to a deep investigation into the modern formal possibilities of that material.

In the last decades of the Franco's life, a new generation of architects rescued the legacy of the GATEPAC with strength: Alejandro de la Sota was the pioneer in that new way, and young architects as Francisco Javier Sáenz de Oiza, Fernando Higueras and Miguel Fisac, often with modest budgets, investigated in prefabrication and collective housing typos.

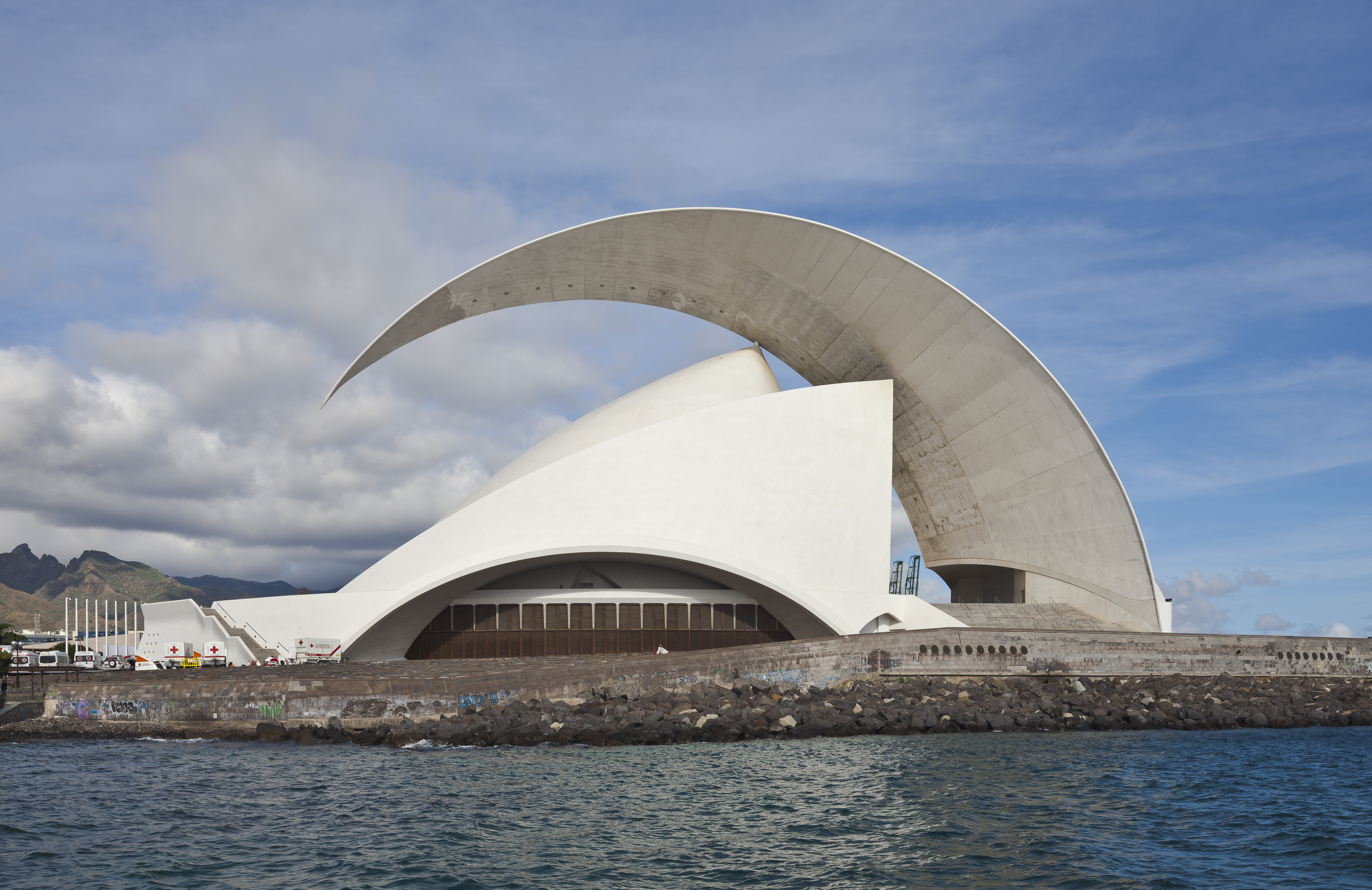
The Auditorio de Tenerife, by Santiago Calatrava, 2003

The death of Franco and the return of democracy brought a new architectural optimism to Spain in the late 1970s and 1980s. Critical regionalism became the dominant school of thought for serious architecture. The influx of money from EU funding, tourism and a flowering economy strengthened and stabilised Spain's economic base, providing fertile conditions for Spanish architecture. A new generation of architects emerged, amongst whom were Enric Miralles, Carme Pinós, and the architect/engineer Santiago Calatrava. The 1992 Barcelona Olympics and the World's Fair in Seville, further bolstered Spain's reputation on the international stage, to the extent that many architects from countries suffering from recessions, moved to Spain to assist in the boom. In recognition of Barcelona's patronage of architecture, the Royal Institute of British Architects awarded the Royal Gold Medal to Barcelona in 1999, the first time in its history the award was made to a city.

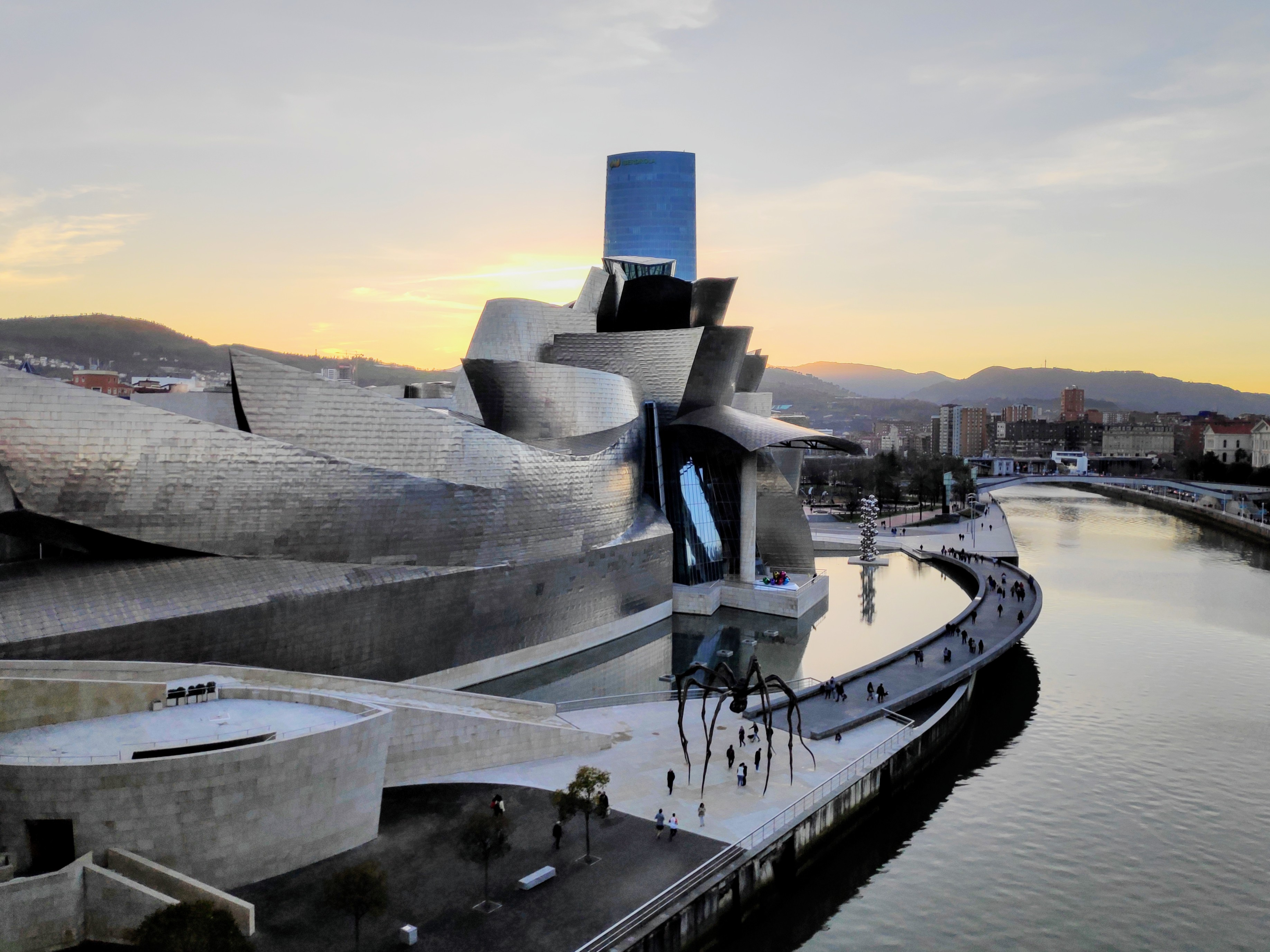
The Guggenheim Museum in Bilbao, 1997

Bilbao attracted the Solomon R. Guggenheim Foundation to construct a new art museum, which opened in 1997. Designed by Frank Gehry in a deconstructivist manner, the Guggenheim Museum Bilbao became world-famous and single-handedly raised the profile of Bilbao on the world stage. Such was the success of the museum that the construction of iconic architecture in towns aspiring to raise their international profile has become a recognised town planning strategy known as the "Bilbao effect".

In 2003, the Prince of Asturias, Felipe de Borbón opened in the city of Santa Cruz de Tenerife (Canary Islands), the modern building of the Auditorio de Tenerife, designed by Santiago Calatrava between 1997-2003. For this event was attended by various correspondents and newspapers around the world.

=== Famous Spanish architects of the 20th century ===
- Antoni Gaudí (1852–1926)
- Lluis Domenech i Montaner (1850–1923)
- Secundino Zuazo (1887–1971)
- Antonio Palacios (1874–1945)
- Casto Fernández-Shaw (1896–1978)
- Josep Lluis Sert (1902–1983)
- Josep Antoni Coderch (1913–1984)
- Luis Gutiérrez Soto (1890–1977)
- Alejandro de la Sota (1913–1996)
- Miguel Fisac (1913–2006)
- Francisco Javier Sáenz de Oiza (1918–2000)
- Julio Cano Lasso (1920–1996)
- Fernando Higueras (1929–2008)
- Rafael Moneo (1937), Pritzker Prize in 1996
- Ricardo Bofill (1939–2022)
- Mariano Bayón (1942)
- Alberto Campo Baeza (1946)
- Santiago Calatrava (1951)
- Adolfo Moran (1953)
- Enric Miralles (1955–2000)
- Mansilla+Tuñón
- Alejandro Zaera (1963)
- Carme Pigem, Ramón Vilalta and Rafael Aranda; Pritzker Prize in 2017

== 21st century ==
In 2006, the exhibition "On-Site: New architecture in Spain" was held in the MoMA. It defined Spain as a country that has lately become known as an international center for design innovation and excellence, as shown in the fact that seven Pritzker awarded architects were selected for the exhibition. As Terence Riley, then in charge of the Architectural Department of the MoMA, said: "There is not a 'Spanish' architectural style. But there is an increasing level of quality and beauty within the new projects, probably more than in any other part of the world". The curator also stated that in Spain there is a lot of construction while there is even more in China. "However, while in China you can find hardly any interesting proposal, there are a lot in Spain. Their variety and open-minded lines are surprising."

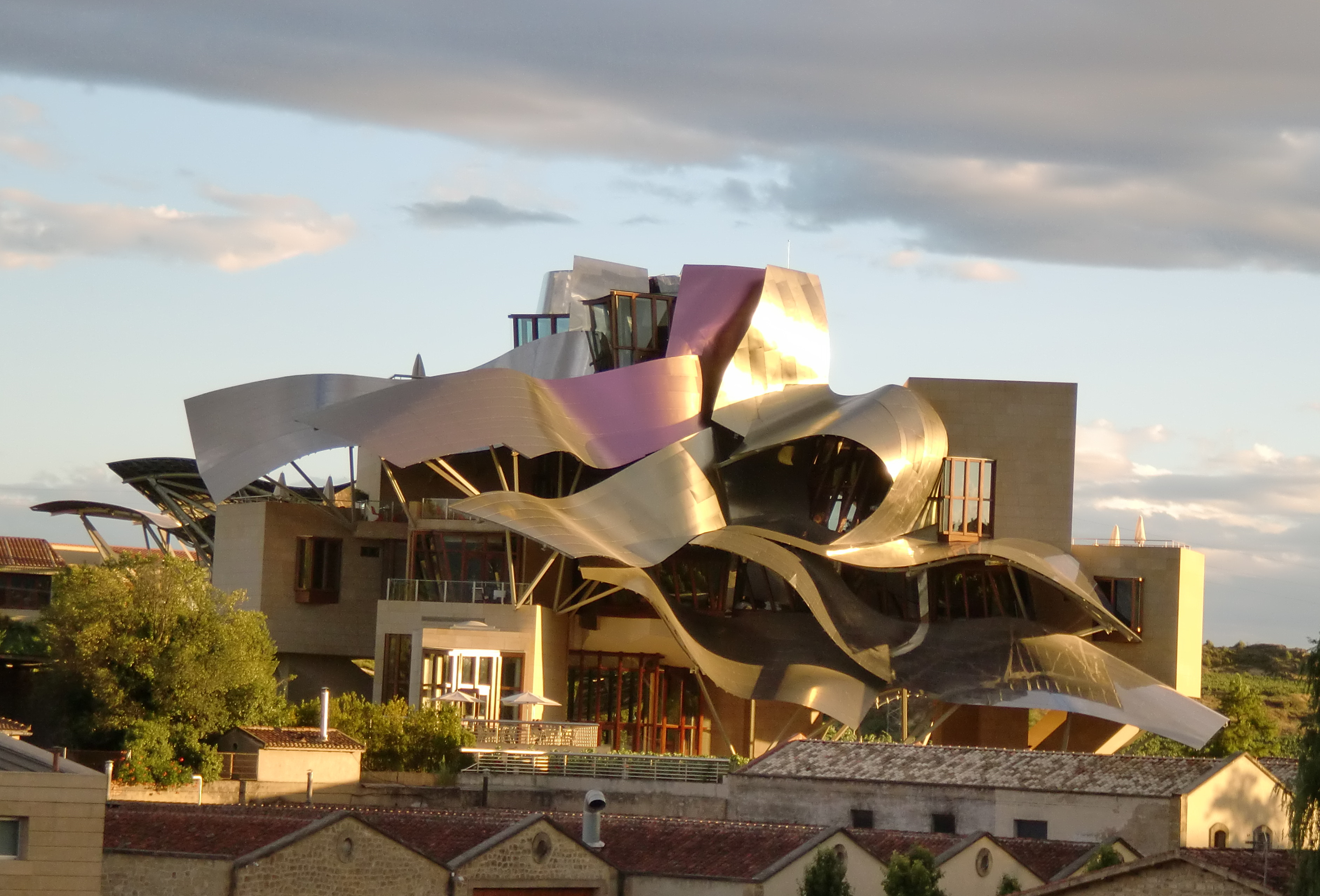
Marqués de Riscal Hotel in Elciego, 2006

In 2006, Terminal 4 of Barajas Airport by Richard Rogers and Antonio Lamela won the British Stirling Prize. In Barcelona, the Torre Glòries by French architect Jean Nouvel combines different architectural concepts, resulting in a striking structure built with reinforced concrete, covered with a façade of glass, with its window openings cut out of the structural concrete. The Marqués de Riscal Hotel in Elciego, designed by Frank Gehry using methods previously employed in the Guggenheim Museum Bilbao, is completed. Between 2006 and 2009, four skyscrapers were built in Madrid, of which the tallest is 250 meters. This business park is called Cuatro Torres Business Area, and the Torre de Cristal, which is the tallest in all of Spain, is designed by César Pelli. From 2008, Spain experienced the late-2000s recession in a particularly severe way and especially in construction, which suffered a sharp drop. Many of the public and private architectural developments were cancelled or indefinitely delayed.

In 2011 the Oscar Niemeyer International Cultural Centre was inaugurated in Avilés, Asturias. This is the only work of the Brazilian architect Oscar Niemeyer in Spain. It has five elements: an open square, a dome, a tower, an auditorium and a multi-purpose building.

== Vernacular architecture ==
Due to the climatic and topographic differences throughout Spain, the vernacular architecture shows a plentiful variety. Limestone, slate, granite, clay (cooked or not), wood, and grass are used in the different regions. Structure and distribution differ depending on regional customs. Some constructions are houses (like alqueria, casa montañesa, caserío, cortijo, palloza, pazo, as well as the pictured ones:

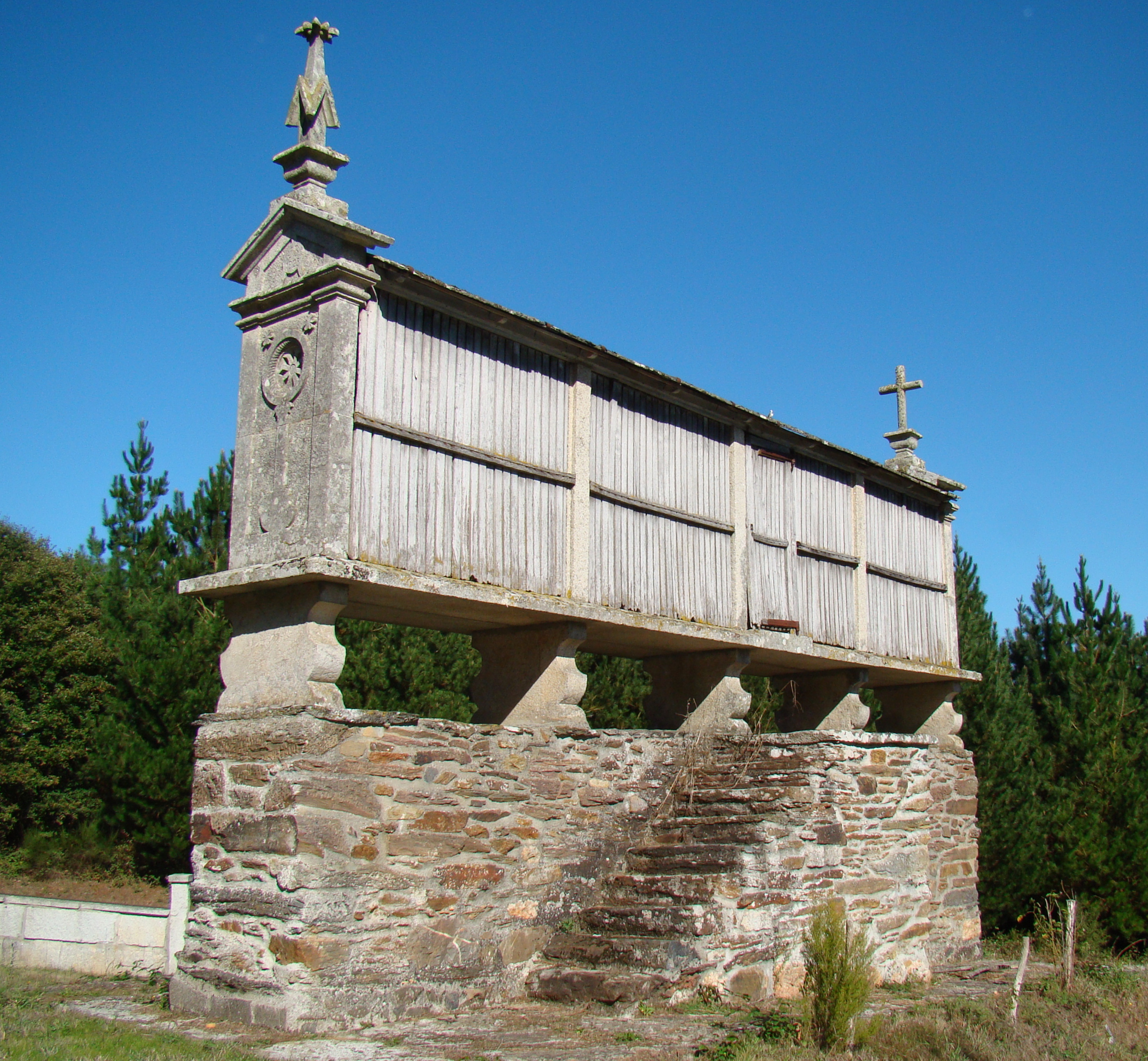
The hórreo is an elevated granary from Galicia and Asturias.

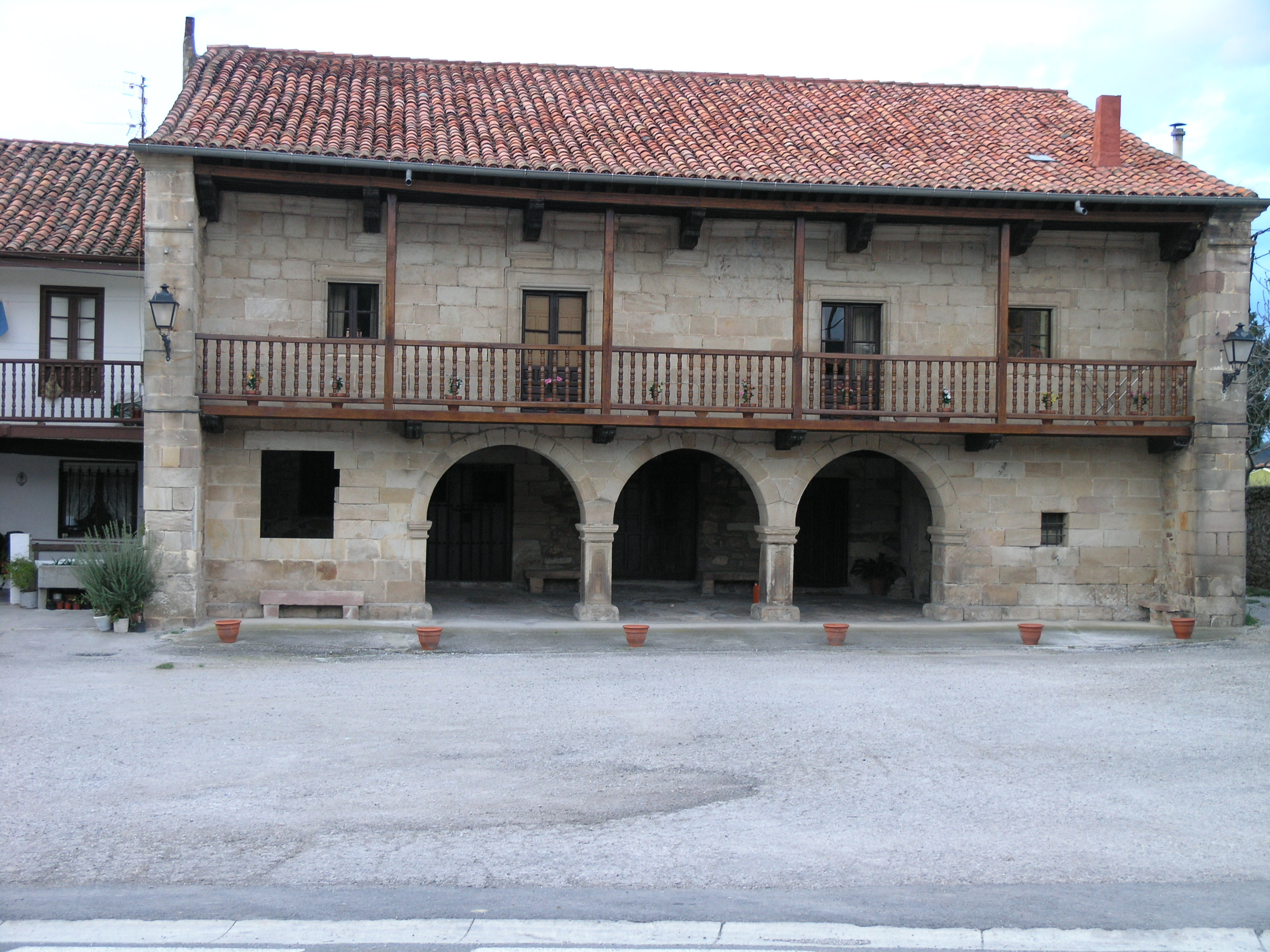
The casona montañesa, stone house typical of Cantabria.

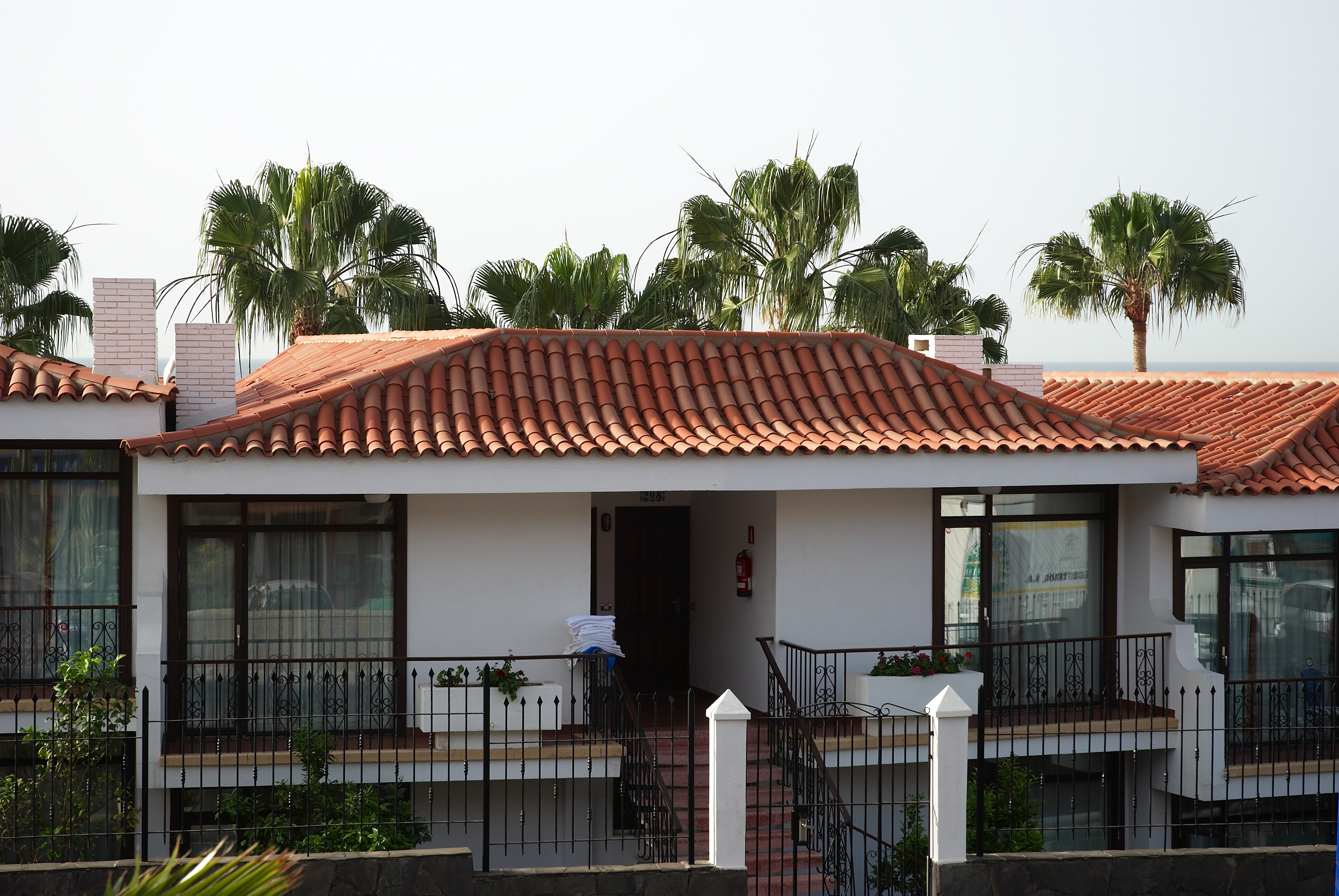
An apartment with Monk and Nun roof tiles in Las Palmas de Gran Canaria, Canary Islands.

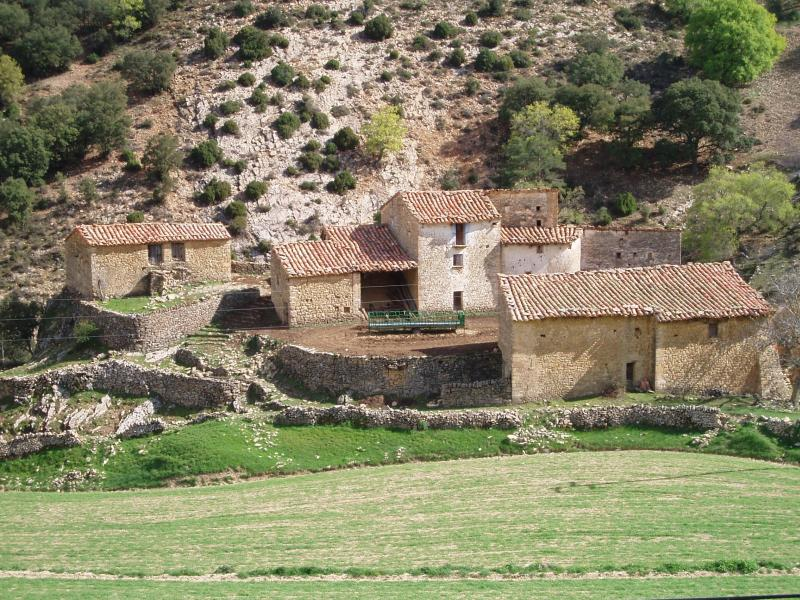
A Masia, in Castellón. Masies evolved from Roman houses.

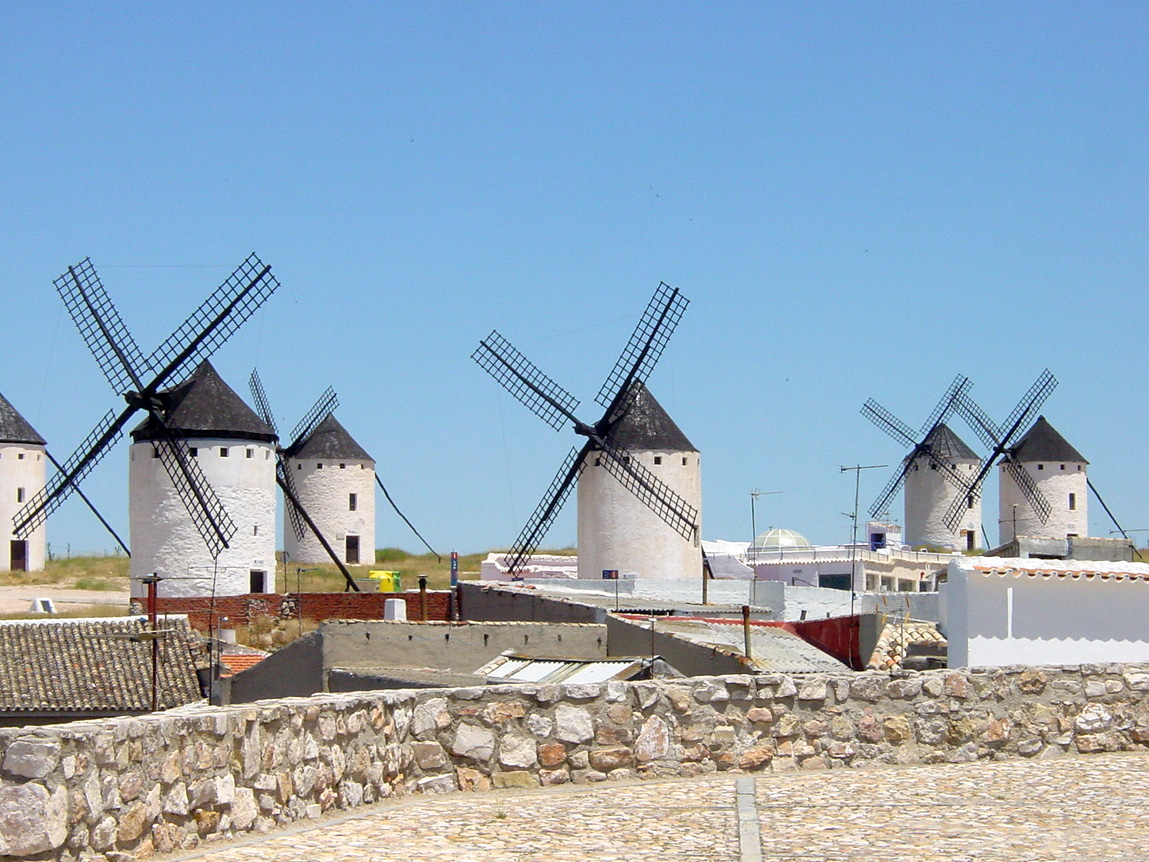
Windmills of Campo de Criptana, La Mancha.

== See also ==
- Architecture of Madrid
- Architecture of Cantabria
- List of missing landmarks in Spain
- Rafael Manzano Prize
- Superior Technical School of Architecture of Madrid
- Spanish art
- Cerdà Plan
