= Roman Theatre (Tarraco) =

Roman theatre in Tarragona, Spain

Roman Theatre of Tarraco
- Location within Spain
- 41°6′46″N 1°14′58″E
- Type: Roman theatre
- Cultures: Iberian, Roman
- Location: Tarragona, Spain
- Region: Hispania Tarraconensis

UNESCO World Heritage Site
- Type: Cultural
- Criteria: ii, iii
- Designated: 2000 (24th session)
- Part of: Archaeological Ensemble of Tárraco
- Reference no.: 875-006
- Region: Europe and North America

Spanish Cultural Heritage
- Official name: Yacimiento Arqueológico Teatro Romano
- Type: Non-movable
- Criteria: Archaeological site
- Designated: 5 December 1977
- Reference no.: RI-55-0000111

The Roman Theatre of Tarraco is a Roman theatre in the Roman colonia of Tarraco –present-day Tarragona, Spain–, capital of the Roman province of Hispania Tarraconensis. Built at the end of the 1st century BC, in the time of Augustus, in the area of the local forum and the port, it was used for Roman theatrical performances.

The planners took advantage of the steep slope of the hill to build part of the seating. Despite much of it having been destroyed during the 20th century, the remains of three fundamental parts of the structure are still visible; the cavea (seating), the orchestra and the scaena. The ruins can be seen from the purpose-built lookout point. Nowadays, it is part of the Archaeological Ensemble of Tárraco that was declared a World Heritage Site by UNESCO in 2000.

== History ==
The theatre was built during the time of Augustus at the end of the 1st century BC as part of the monumentalization of the forum of the colony, making it one of the most emblematic buildings of Tarraco.

The building was in use until the end of the 2nd century, at which point it ceased to function as a theater and was repurposed for other uses. In the 3rd century, following a fire within the compound, new buildings were constructed in the monumental area adjacent to the theater using materials salvaged from the theater itself.

== Architectural Characteristics and Uses ==
The theatre currently stands in a state of neglect, without any proper musealization, even though it has been declared a World Heritage Site. Recently, a viewpoint has been enabled on Sant Magí street, and work is ongoing to restore the theater space as well as the surrounding constructions. For its construction, the natural slope of the terrain was exploited, similar to the Amphitheater in the same city, to carve out a portion of the seating area. For the remaining sections, a system of annular cryptoporticus was used.

The scaena is a critical component of the Roman theatre design. It refers to the stage area where theatrical performances occurred. Elevated, it sat atop a podium often adorned with exedras. Adjacent to the scaena, a designated area was laid out to serve as the primary entrance for theatergoers. This area was beautified with gardens, and at its core, featured a pond distinguished by statues positioned on pedestals.

The stage's facade, known as the proscaenium, was enclosed and intricately decorated, a feature referred to as the frons scaenae.

Regarding audience seating, the design of the Roman theatre considered social and census-based hierarchy.

== Conservation and Discoveries ==
Today, only the first five rows of seating around the orchestra remain intact, along with two of the three radial staircases that segmented the seating area. The foundation of both the pulpitum and the scaenae frons is still visible, with remnants showing where the curtain supports were once placed.

Archaeological excavations within the theater and its vicinity have unearthed significant artifacts, including capitals, friezes, columns, sculptures, and more.

== See also ==
- List of Roman theatres
- Tarragona Amphitheatre
- Wall of Tarragona
- Devil's Bridge
- Tower of the Scipios
- Tarraco
