= Provincial forum of Tarraco =

UNESCO World Heritage Site
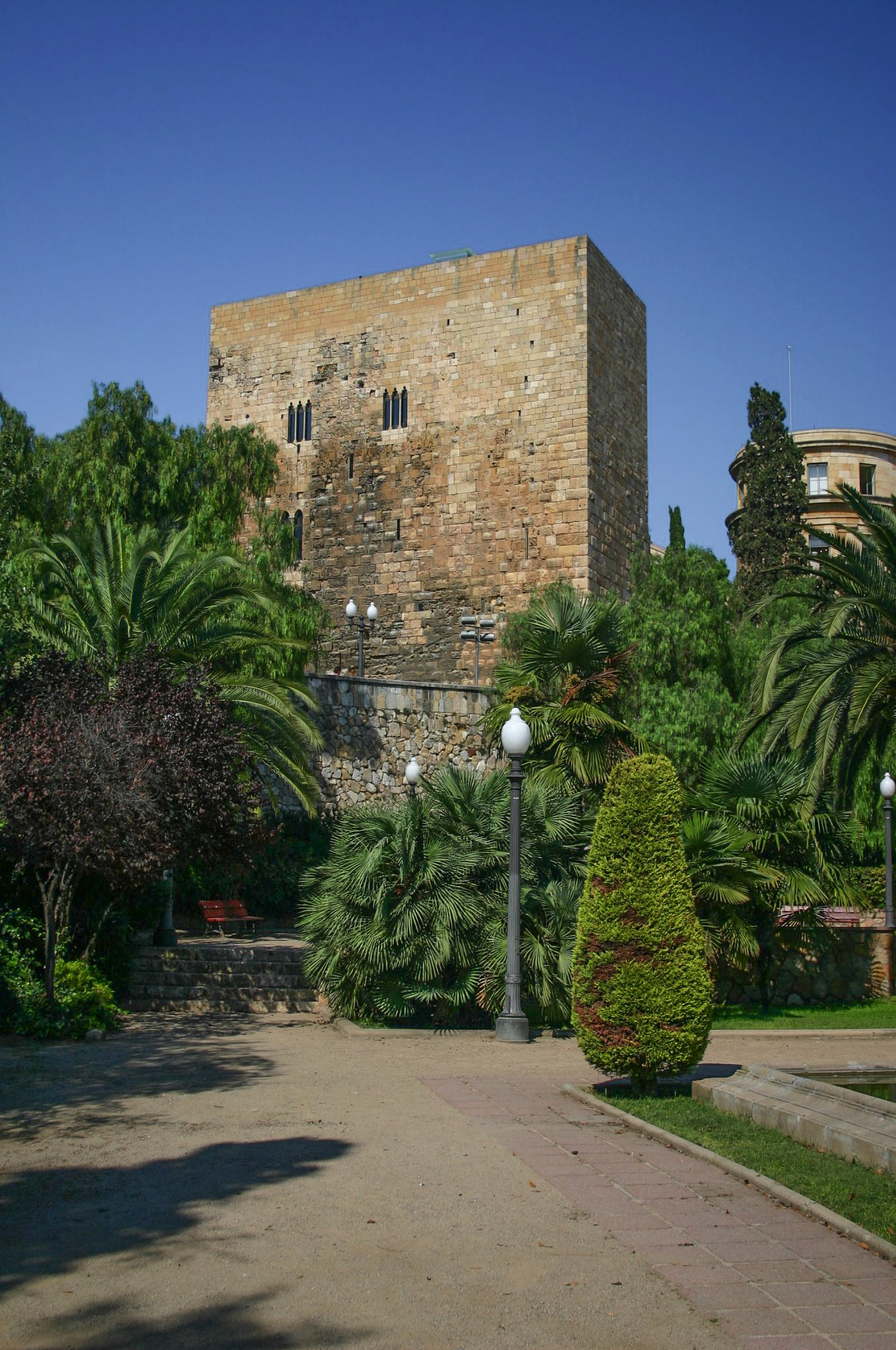
- Pretorian Tower, the entrance of the Provincial Forum

- Location within Catalonia
- Location: Tarragona, Spain
- Part of: Archaeological Ensemble of Tárraco
- Criteria: Cultural: (ii), (iii)
- Reference: 875-003
- Inscription: 2000 (24th Session)
- Area: 5.85 ha (0.0226 sq mi)
- Coordinates: 41°7′5″N 1°15′21″E

The provincial forum of Tarraco is a Roman archaeological site in Tarragona, Catalonia, Spain, encompassing an area of 18 ha. Together with other Roman remains in the city it makes the Archaeological Ensemble of Tarraco, which was listed in the UNESCO World Heritage Sites in 2000.

It was built starting from 73 AD, by order of Emperor Vespasian, and remained in use until the 5th century. The worship area is now occupied by the cathedral and other edifices.

== History ==
It was built by the Romans in 73 AD, by order of Emperor Vespasian. Its use continued until the middle of the 5th century, after which the buildings surrounding the square were repurposed as private residences. From the 12th century onwards, the interior of the square was urbanized and a street layout was established, which has been maintained to this day. This area corresponds to the network of streets that make up a significant part of the medieval district of Tarragona.

== Features ==
The area consisted of a square dedicated to worship and a larger one for performances, in addition to the lower enclosure where the circus was located.

- The worship enclosure was the seat of the concilium and was located in the highest part of the city, which today is occupied by the Cathedral, the Cathedral Square, and other buildings. This was an impressive square measuring 153 meters by 136 meters, surrounded by a perimeter wall that was 9 meters high. This wall supported the roof of a portico with columns, approximately 11 meters wide, which encircled the entire square. Within this columned square stood the grand temple of Augustus. While its impressive proportions are known (the columns were about 13.5 meters tall), its exact location remains uncertain.
- The representation square was situated on a terrace lower than the worship area and was connected to it by a grand staircase, which aligns with the current stairs in front of the cathedral. The square measured 175 meters in width and 318 meters in length, making it the largest square ever constructed by the Roman Empire. Three of the four sides of the square were bordered by a raised podium covered by a wide porticoed space that rested on a pilaster wall (many fragments of which can still be observed in the city). Behind this portico rose a long vault, of which various sections remain, such as the so-called Pallol or Pretorio vaults. These likely supported an upper gallery. At the southern corners of this square stand the towers of the Ancient Courthouse and the Pretorio, which served as staircases providing access from the lower level of the circus to the square and the upper gallery.

== Buildings ==
- Provincial Council
- Circus
- Tabularium (state archive)
- State treasure
- Curia
- Audience Hall
- Temple of the Imperial Worship

== See also ==
- List of Bienes de Interés Cultural in the Province of Tarragona
- Forum
- Tarragona Amphitheatre
- Wall of Tarragona
- Les Ferreres Aqueduct
- Tower of the Scipios
- Roman Theatre (Tarraco)
- Arch of Bará
