= Roman Forum of Tarragona =

Roman Forum of Tarragona may refer to:

- Colonial forum of Tarraco
- Provincial forum of Tarraco
