= Forum (Roman) =

Public square in a Roman municipium

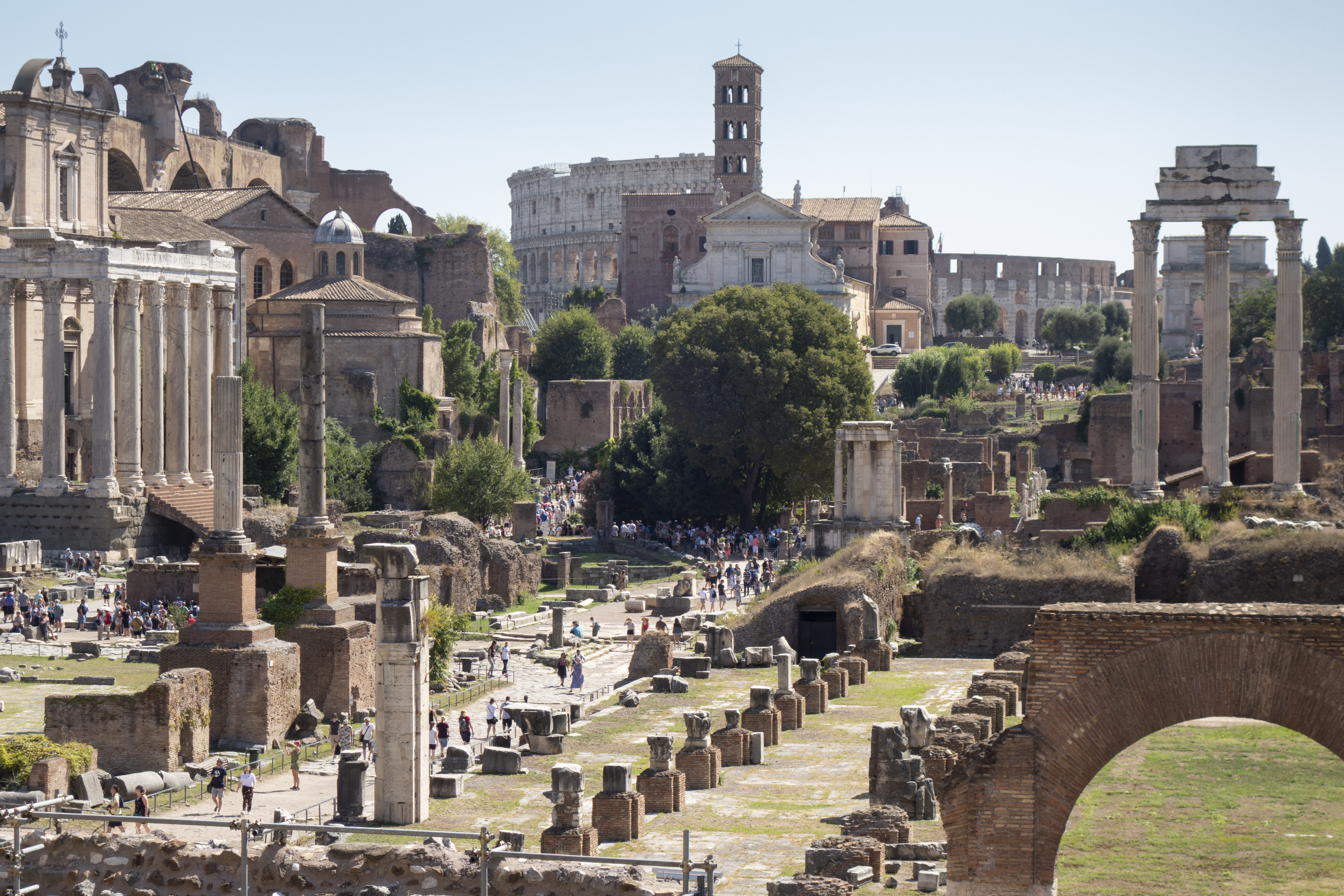
The Forum Romanum in Rome, Italy

A forum (Latin: forum, pl.: fora; English pl.: either fora or forums) was a public square in a municipium, or any civitas, of ancient Rome reserved primarily for the vending of goods; i.e., a marketplace, along with the buildings used for shops and the stoas used for open stalls. But such fora functioned secondarily for multiple purposes, including as social meeting places for discussion. Many fora were constructed at remote locations along a road by the magistrate responsible for the road, in which case the forum was the only settlement at the site and had its own name, such as Forum Popili or Forum Livi.

== Functions ==
In addition to its standard function as a marketplace, a forum was a gathering place of great social significance, and often the scene of diverse activities, including political discussions and debates, rendezvous, meetings, etc. In that case, it supplemented the function of a conciliabulum.

The Roman Forum in Rome, Italy

Every municipality (municipium) had a forum. Fora were the first of any civitas synoecized whether Latin, Italic, Etruscan, Greek, Celtic, or other. The first forums were sited between independent villages in the period, known only through archaeology. After the rise of the Roman Republic, the most noted forum of the Roman world—the Roman Forum in Rome itself—served as a model of new construction. By the time of the late Republic, expansions refurbishing the forums of the city had inspired Pompey Magnus to create the Theatre of Pompey in 55 BC. His theatre included a massive forum behind the theatre arcades known as the Portico of Pompey (Porticus Pompeii). The structure was the forebear of Julius Caesar's forum and others to follow.

Other major fora are found in Italy. However, they are not to be confused with the piazza of the modern town, which may have originated from a number of different types of ancient civic centers, or more likely was its own type. While similar in use and function to fora, most were created in the Middle Ages and are often not a part of the original city footprint.

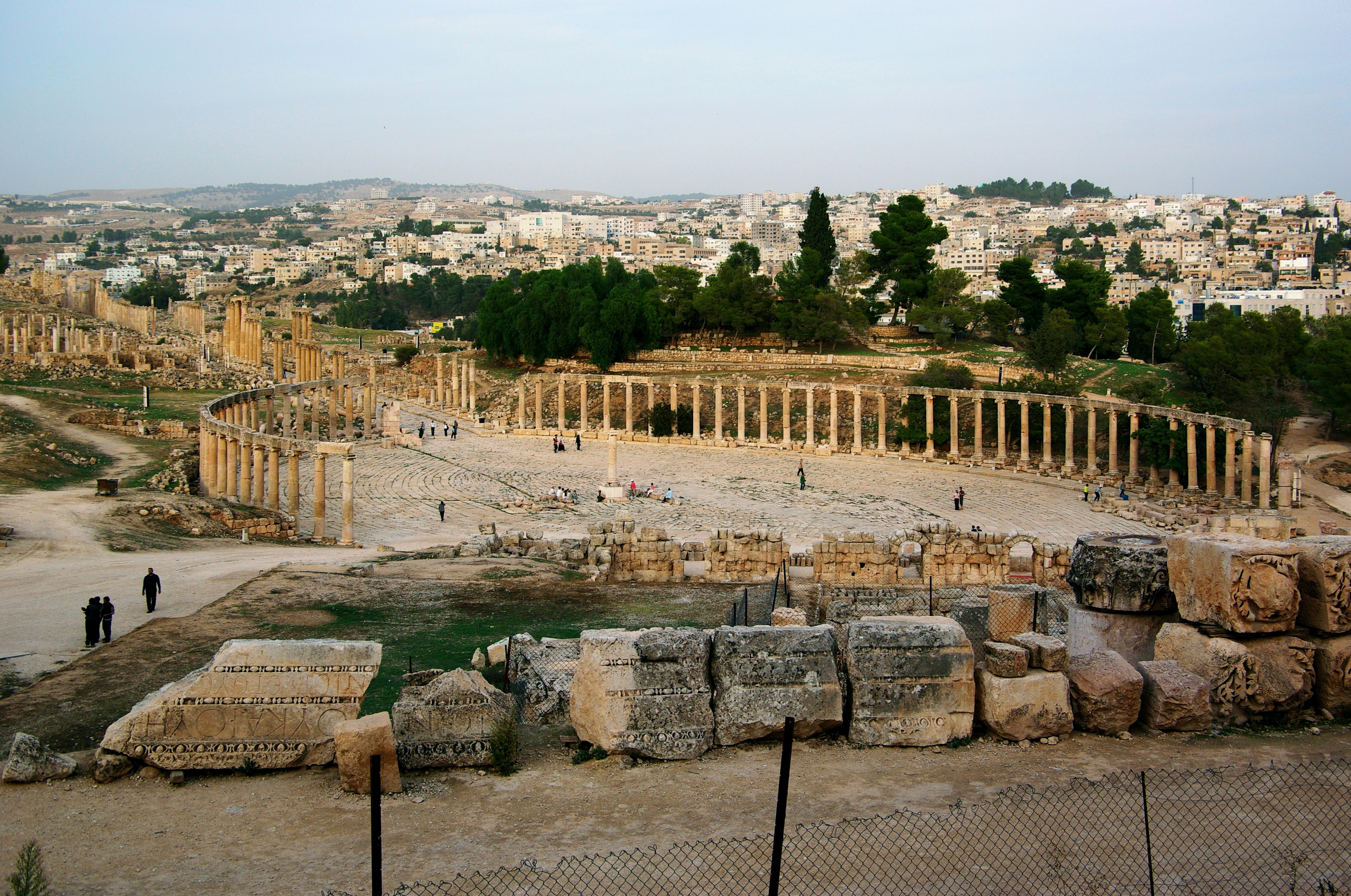
The Forum of Jerash, in Jordan. The columns mark the location of a stoa, or covered walkway, where the stalls of open-air vendors might be located in bad weather. Note the semi-circular shape and traces of a central podium, similar in function to a theatre.

Fora were a regular part of every ancient Roman province in the Republic and the Empire, with archaeological examples at:

- Forum of Plovdiv, Bulgaria
- Forum of Philippi, Greece
- Forum of Thessaloniki, Greece
- Forum of Beirut, Lebanon
- Forum and Provincial Forum of Mérida, Spain
- Colonial forum and Provincial forum of Tarragona, Spain

In new Roman towns the forum was usually located at, or just off, the intersection of the main north–south and east–west streets (the cardo and decumanus). All fora would have a Temple of Jupiter at the north end, and would also contain other temples, as well as the basilica; a public weights and measures table, so customers at the market could ensure they were not being sold short measures; and would often have the baths nearby. At election times, candidates would use the steps of the temples in the forum to make their election speeches, and would expect their clients to come to support them.

== Typical structures ==
- Basilica
- Macellum
- Roman baths
- Roman temple
- Triumphal arch
- Victory column

== Equivalent spaces in other cultures ==
- Agora
- Civic center
- Internet forum
- Piazza
- Plateia
- Plaza
- Town square

== See also ==
- Amphitheatre
- Circus (building)
- Hippodrome
- Roman theatre (structure)
- A Funny Thing Happened on the Way to the Forum
