= Roman quarry of El Mèdol =

UNESCO World Heritage Site
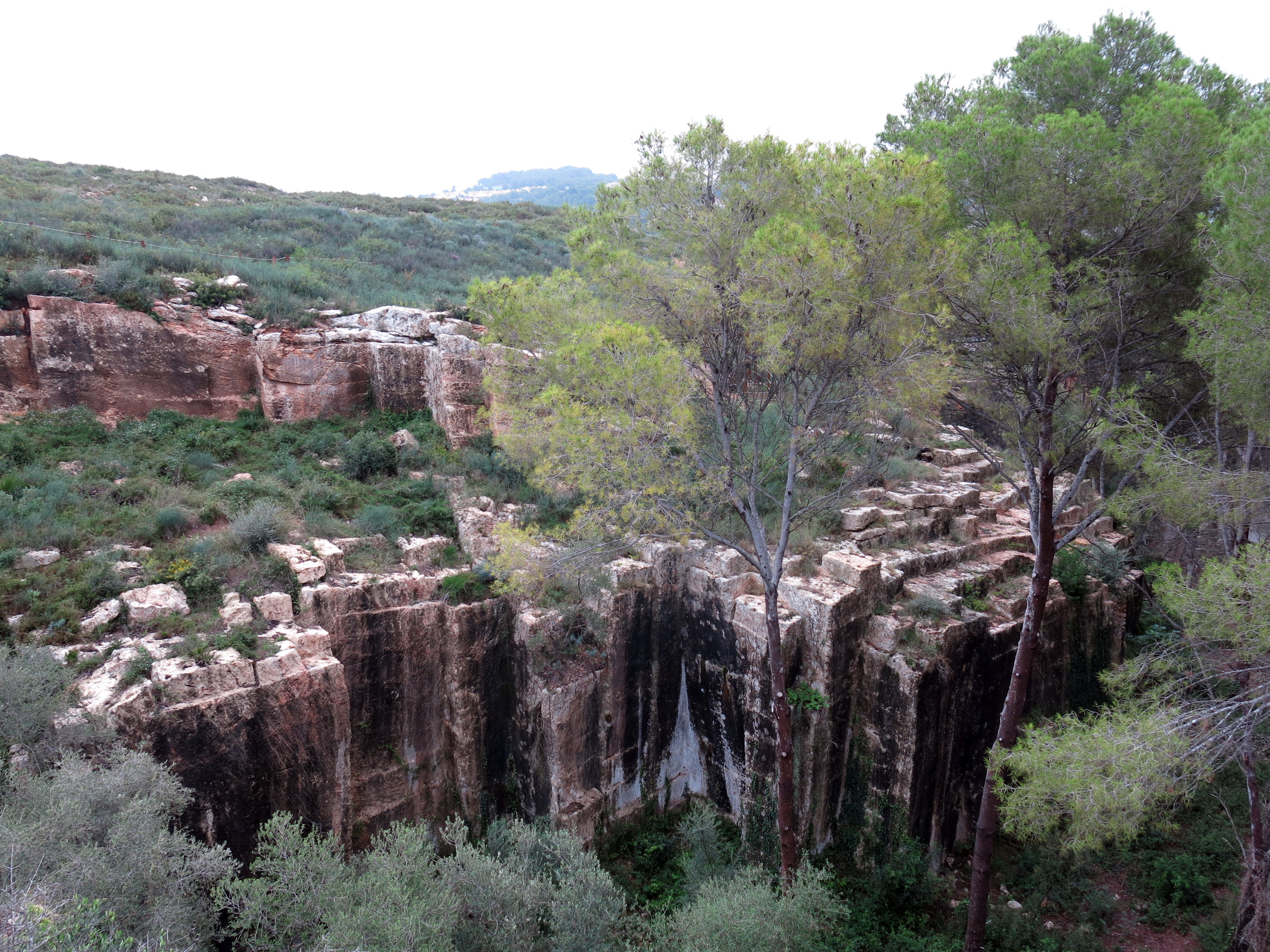

- Location within Catalonia
- Location: Tarragona, Spain
- Part of: Archaeological Ensemble of Tárraco
- Criteria: Cultural: (ii), (iii)
- Reference: 875-011
- Inscription: 2000 (24th Session)
- Area: 5.3 ha (0.020 sq mi)
- Coordinates: 41°8′12.70″N 1°20′22.40″E

The Roman quarry of El Mèdol was first excavated during the period of the Roman Republic and the Roman Empire.

Its dimensions are over 200m wide and 10 to 40 deep. It was used to build the most important buildings of Tarraco (Colonia Iulia Urbs Triumphalis Tarraco, current Tarragona), capital of Hispania Citerior. At the centre remains a "witness column" (a column made of intact original rock) frequently found in Roman quarries.

It is the largest of the six Roman quarries around Tarraco. It provided "Soldo" Miocene limestone with tones between white and pink, golden generally clear. This rock, although unsuitable for the most detailed Roman architecture of the city, served mainly the Roman building and medieval buildings of Tarragona, including the Cathedral of Santa Tecla.

The quarry is very close to the Roman Via Augusta, a major imperial communication channel whose track follows the current national road 340 between Barcelona and Tarragona. This route was used to transport some 50,000 cubic meters of stone, mainly along the 6 km that separate the quarries of Tarraco.

The quarry can be visited easily from the National Road 340 or from the AP-7, by La Mora.

The quarry is included in the UNESCO World Heritage of the archaeological complex of Tarraco.

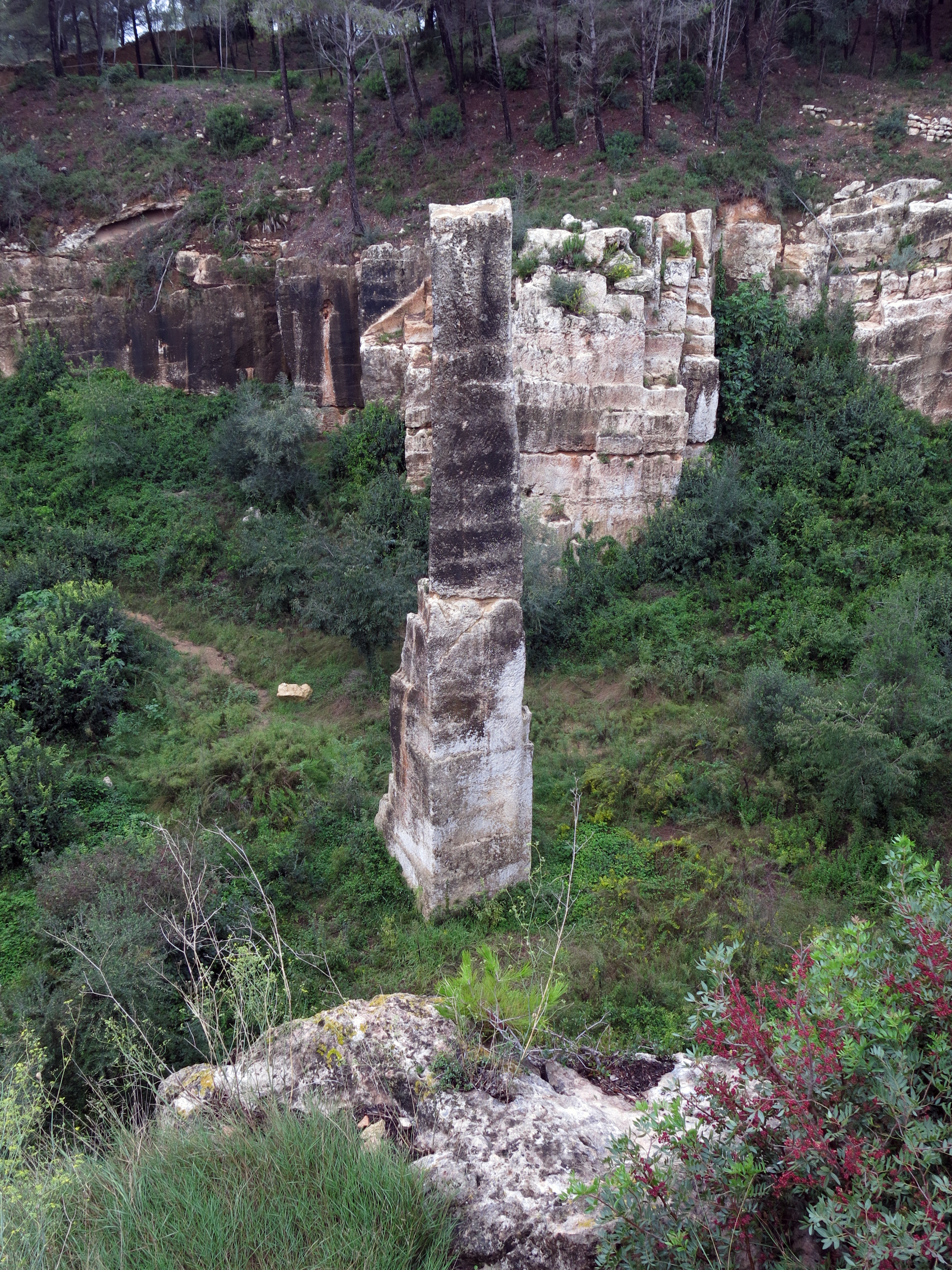
El Mèdol, Tarragona
