= Tarragona International Fireworks Displays Competition =

The Concurs Internacional de Focs Artificial is the most important fireworks contest in the Mediterranean area. It is held on the first week of July in Tarragona, Spain at Punta del Miracle, a bay praised by the famous architect Antoni Gaudí for its beauty. Celebrated since 1321, the festival and is recognized as an event of national touristic interest by Spanish government. Each year the City Council of Tarragona elects a board of judges, which then selects the six international pyrotechnic companies that will compete. The order in which the contestants will appear is decided through a draw.

The fireworks are both aerial and aquatic. Each show is judged on a number of factors, including:

- Occupation of the air space
- Purity, intensity, brightness and duration of the colors
- Chromatic variety, luminosity, dimensions
- Form designs and diversity of effects
- Sonority
- Harmony with the environment
- Originality
- Rhythm and the narrative arc of the performance
- Acceptance by the public.

Since 1990, pyrotechnic companies from around the world have competed at Tarragona: Ricardo Caballer, Vicente Caballer, and Turís from Valencia; Pirogestión and Igual from Catalonia; Astondoa from Basque country; Francesco Pagano, Martarello, La Rosa Lorenzo, and Orzella from Italy; Lidu and China Panda from China; Marutamaya and Tamaya from Japan; Gamma P from Germany; and Foti from Australia.

Approximately sixty thousand people attend each day of the competition, and many pyrotechnicians attend to buy new products. The winning pyrotechnic company is selected to put on fireworks for the city's largest festival, Santa Tecla Festival, in the fall (typically sometime between the 15th and 24 September).

== External resources ==
- Official website of the competition, English and German version
- Official website in Spanish, Catalan and English
