= Roman villa of Centcelles =

UNESCO World Heritage Site
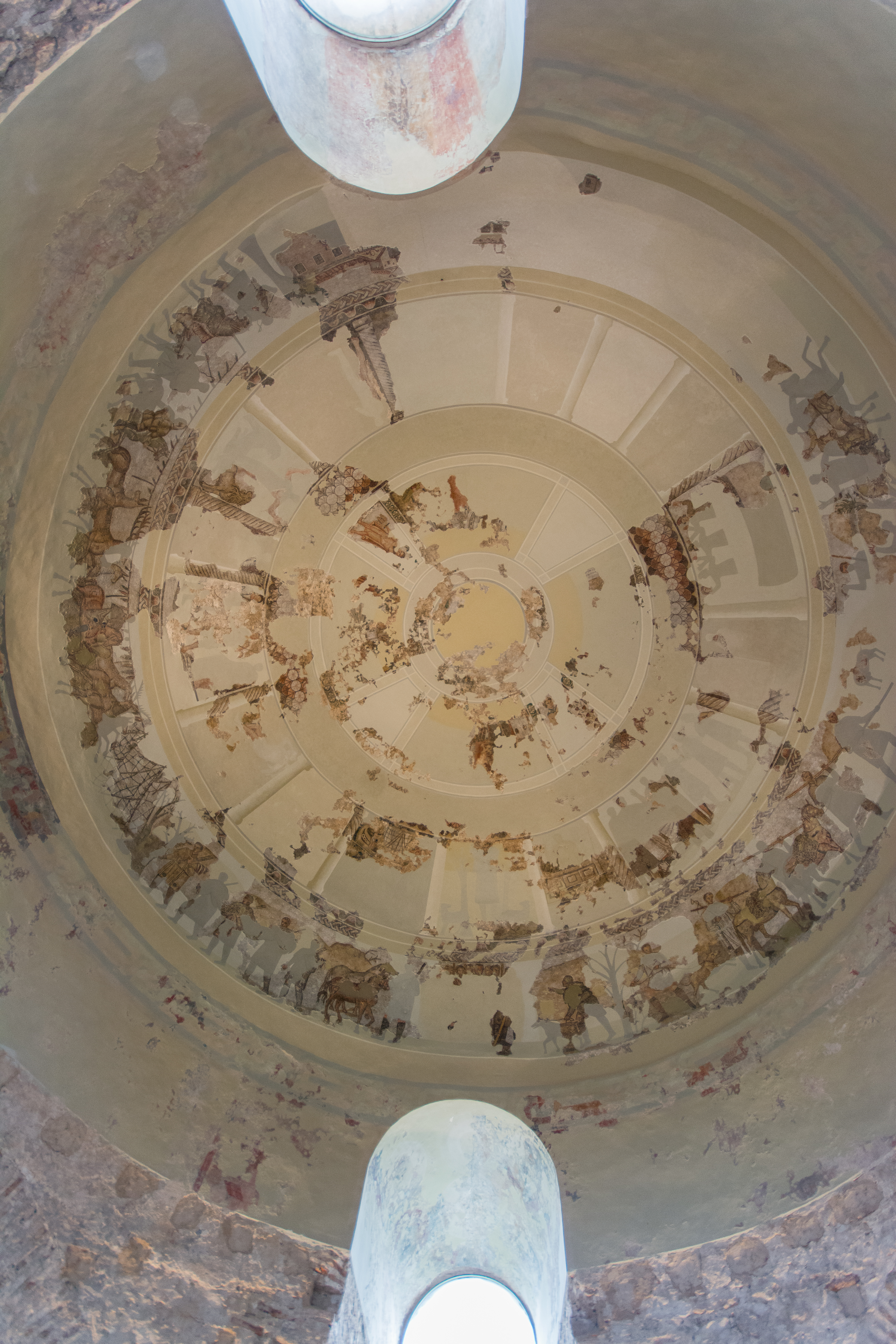

- Location within Catalonia
- Location: Constantí, Spain
- Part of: Archaeological Ensemble of Tárraco
- Criteria: Cultural: (ii), (iii)
- Reference: 875-012
- Inscription: 2000 (24th Session)
- Area: 2.24 ha (0.0086 sq mi)
- Coordinates: 41°9′7.60″N 1°13′49.70″E

The Roman villa of Centcelles is located in the municipality of Constantí, in Catalonia (Spain). It contains a masterpiece of Early Christian Art. In one of its rooms, which has been almost completely preserved, you can see the oldest known dome mosaic with a Christian theme in the Roman world, dated to the 4th century AD.

== See also ==
- Centum Cellas
