= Archaeological Ensemble of Tárraco =

UNESCO World Heritage Site
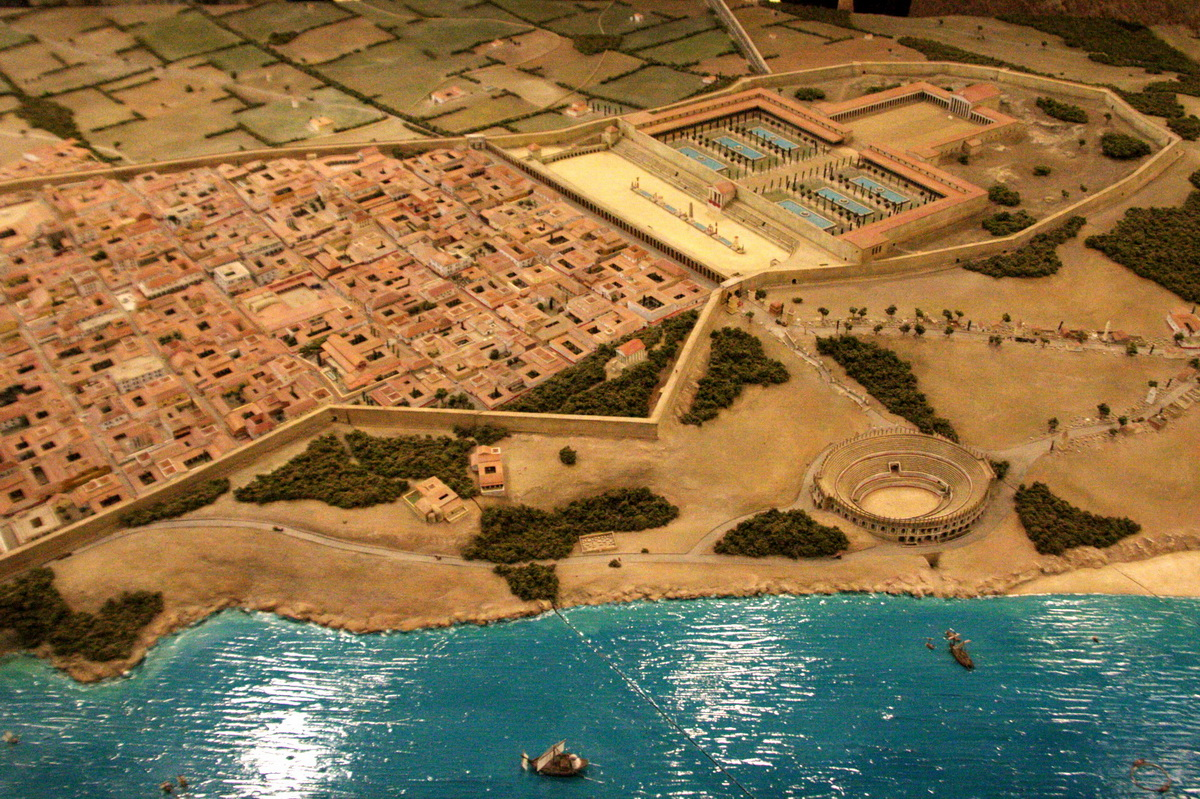

- Location within Spain
- Location: Tarraco, Tarragona, Spain
- Includes: 1. Roman walls 2. Imperial cult enclosure 3. Provincial Forum; 4. Circus; 5. Colonial Forum; 6. Roman Theatre; 7. Amphitheatre, basilica, and Romanesque church 8. Paleochristian cemetery 9. Aqueduct; 10. Tower of the Scipios; 11. Médol quarry 12. Centelles villa – mausoleum 13. Dels Munts villa 14. Triumphal Arch of Berá
- Criteria: Cultural: (ii), (iii)
- Reference: 875
- Inscription: 2000 (24th Session)
- Area: 32.65 ha (0.1261 sq mi)
- Buffer zone: 110.4 ha (0.426 sq mi)
- Coordinates: 41°6′53″N 1°15′33.5″E

Archaeological Ensemble of Tárraco is inscribed as UNESCO world heritage site since 2000. It is situated in Tarragona.

== List of monuments ==
It consists of the following monuments:

Identifier	Name	Location	Coordinates	Photo
875-001	Wall of Tarragona	Tarragona	41°07′12.4″N 1°15′32.6″E	
875-002	The Imperial cult enclosure	Tarragona	41°07′10.3″N 1°15′30.0″E	
875-003	Provincial forum of Tarraco	Tarragona	41°07′05.0″N 1°15′21.0″E	
875-004	The Circus	Tarragona	41°06′56.9″N 1°15′24.5″E	
875-005	Colonial forum of Tarraco	Tarragona	41°06′52.5″N 1°14′56.6″E	
875-006	Roman theatre of Tarraco	Tarragona	41°06′46″N 1°14′58″E	
875-007	Tarragona Amphitheatre, the basilica and Roman church	Tarragona	41°06′52.4″N 1°15′31.69″E	
875-008	Early Christian cemetery	Tarragona	41°06′57″N 1°14′18″E	
875-009	Les Ferreres Aqueduct	4 km north of Tarragona	41°08′45″N 1°14′38″E	
875-010	Torre dels Escipions	5 km east of Tarragona	41°07′55″N 1°19′08″E	
875-011	Roman quarry of El Mèdol	9 km north of Tarragona	41°08′17″N 1°20′21″E	
875-012	Roman villa of Centcelles	4,6 km north-north-east de Tarragona	41°09′07.6″N 1°13′49.7″E	
875-013	Villa dels Munts	10 km east of Tarragona	41°08′01.8″N 1°22′22.8″E	
875-014	Arc de Berà	20 km east of Tarragona	41°10′22.9″N 1°28′07.3″E	
