= Portal de Sant Antoni (Tarragona) =

Coordinates: 41°07′06″N 1°15′38″E

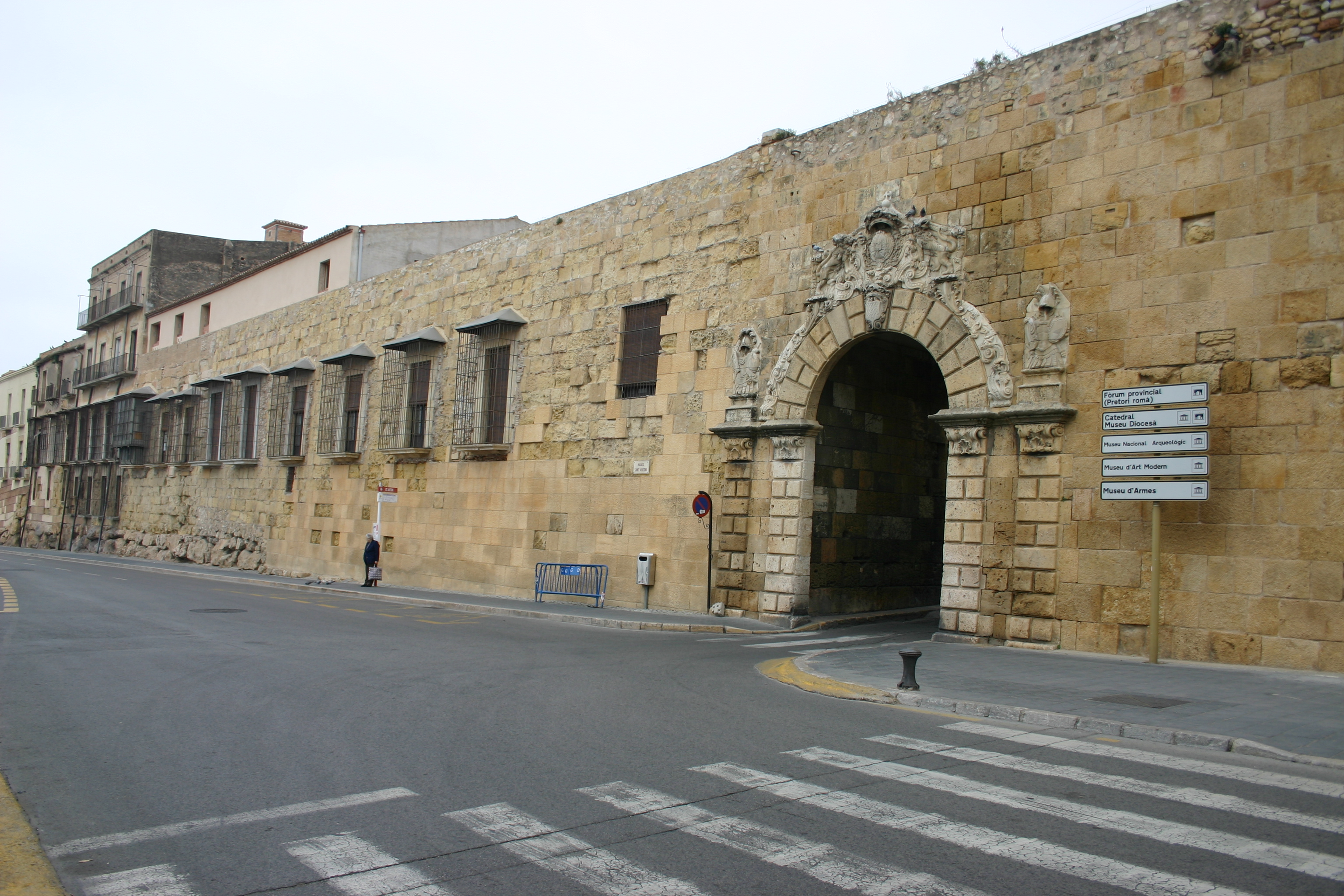
Wall

The Portal de Sant Antoni is a monumental gate on the wall of Tarragona, Catalonia, Spain.

As attested by an inscription, it was built in 1737, in Baroque style. Over the arch is the coat of arms of King Philip V of Spain, flanked by two lions. Under it, is the coat of arms of Tarragona.
