= Arc de Berà =

UNESCO World Heritage Site
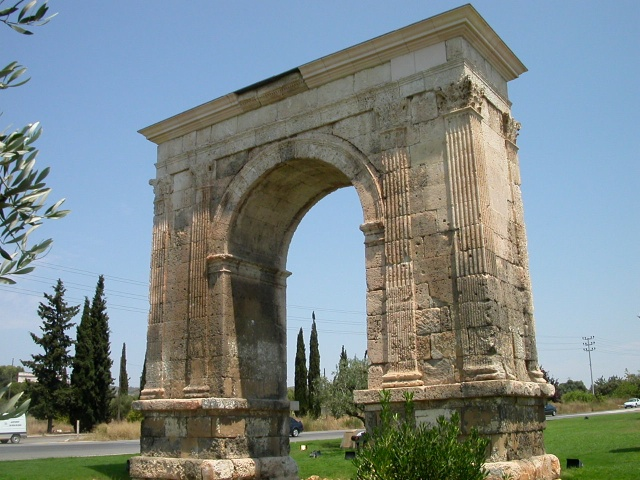

- Location within Spain
- Official name: Triumphal Arch of Berá
- Location: Roda de Berà, Spain
- Part of: Archaeological Ensemble of Tárraco
- Criteria: Cultural: (ii), (iii)
- Reference: 875-014
- Inscription: 2000 (24th Session)
- Area: 0.01 ha (1,100 sq ft)
- Coordinates: 41°10′22.90″N 1°28′7.30″E

The Arc de Berà (sometimes erroneously written Barà) is a triumphal arch some 20 km north-east of the city of Tarragona, Spain, close to Roda de Berà. This monument is part of the Archaeological Ensemble of Tarraco, which was added to the UNESCO's list of World Heritage Sites in 2000. It stands on the line of what was the Via Augusta, now the N-340 road.

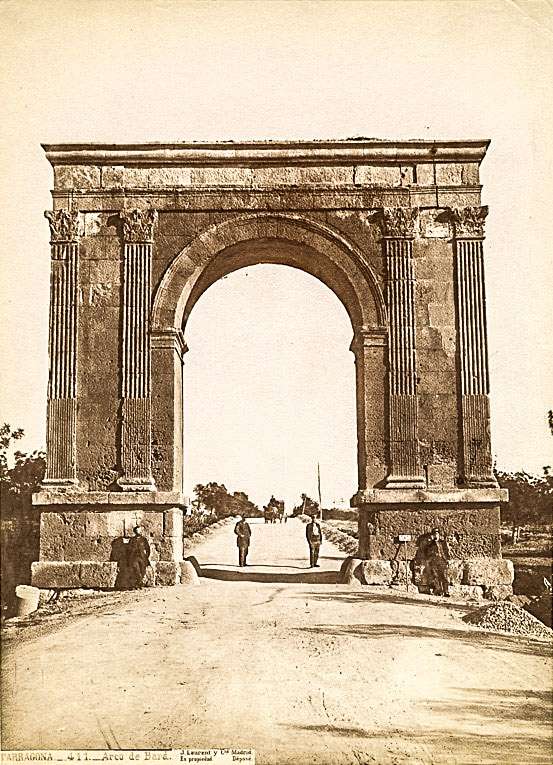
Arc de Berà, Tarragona, Spain, photograph by Juan Laurent, 1866–1867, Department of Image Collections, National Gallery of Art Library, Washington, DC

Its name derives from the count Berà. It is a triumphal arch with a single opening consisting of a central body on a podium, decorated with fluted pilasters crowned by Corinthian capitals. The upper part of the construction is an entablature made up of architrave, frieze and cornice. The stone used is probably from a local quarry.

The monument was erected in the reign of Augustus, around 13 BC. It was later restored at the beginning of the 2nd century AD pursuant to terms of the will of Lucius Licinius Sura, as reflected in a surviving inscription on the entablature that reads: “Ex testamento L(uci) Licini L(uci) f(ilii) Serg (ia tribu) Surae consa[...]”. It is thought it was dedicated to Augustus or to his genius, and that it marked the limit of the district of Tarraco.
