= Roda de Berà =

- Municipality
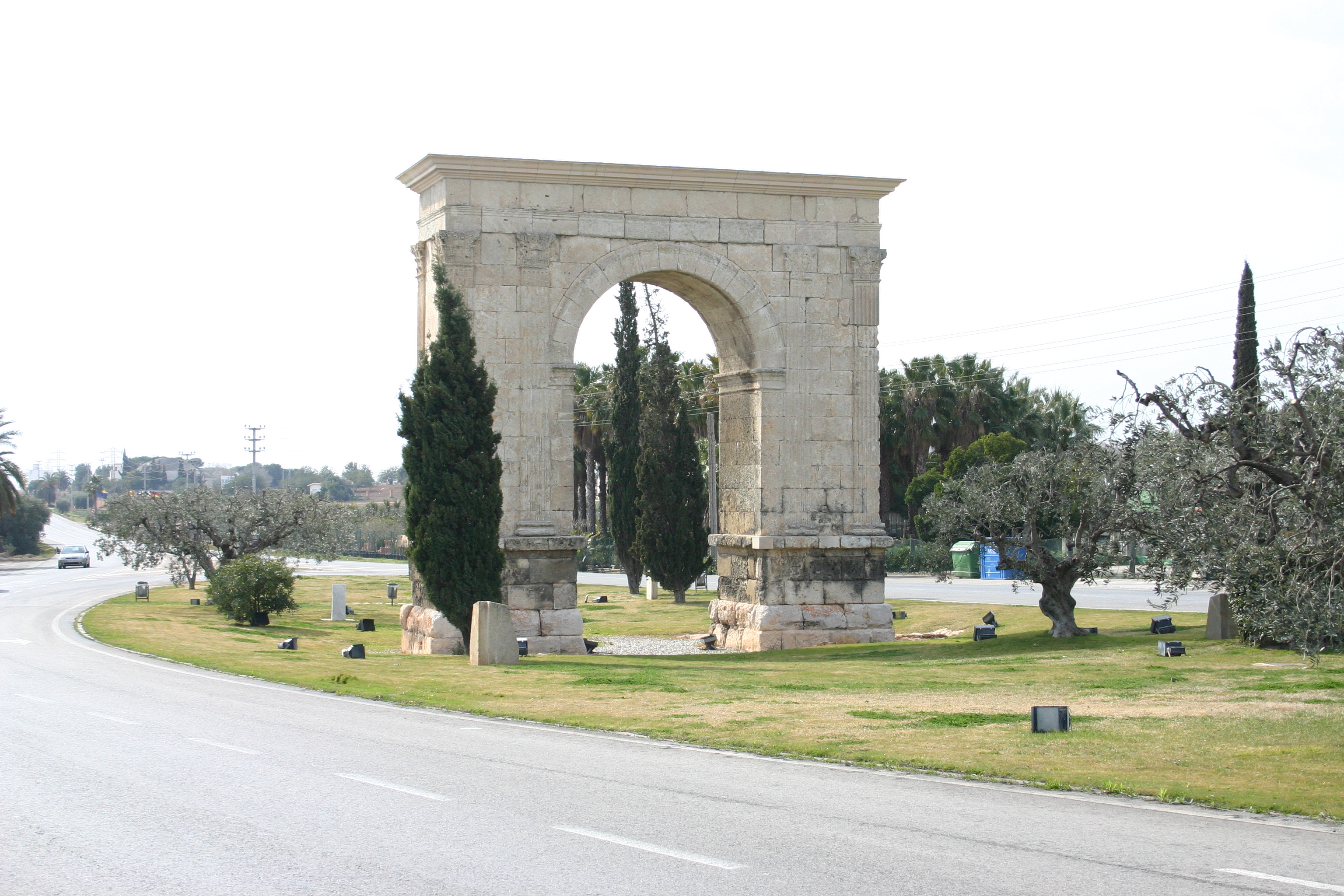
- Berà Arch

- Flag Coat of arms

- Location in Catalonia
- Coordinates: 41°11′14″N 1°27′21″E
- Country: Spain
- Community: Catalonia
- Province: Tarragona
- Comarca: Tarragonès

Government
  - Mayor: Pere Virgili Domínguez (2015) (Tria Roda)

Area
  - Total: 16.5 km^{2} (6.4 sq mi)
- Elevation: 67 m (220 ft)

Population (2025-01-01)
  - Total: 8,260
  - Density: 501/km^{2} (1,300/sq mi)
- Demonym: Rodenc
- Postal code: 43883
- Website: www.rodadebera.cat

Roda de Berà (Catalan pronunciation: [ˈrɔðə ðə βəˈɾa]) is a municipality in the comarca of the Tarragonès in Catalonia, Spain. It has a population of 8,260 (register office, 2025).

It is situated on the coast in the east of the comarca. The Roman Via Augusta ran through the municipality, and the triumphal Berà Arch survives in the middle of the present N-340 coast road.

There is a Renfe railway station in the west of the municipality.

There is a new marina and a small village in various architectural styles.
