= Tarragona Amphitheatre =

Ancient Roman amphitheater in Tarragona, Spain

Roman Amphitheatre
- View of the amphitheatre
- Interactive map of Roman Amphitheatre
- 41°6′53″N 1°15′33.50″E
- Type: Roman amphitheatre
- Location: Tarragona, Spain
- Region: Hispania Tarraconensis

UNESCO World Heritage Site
- Official name: Amphitheatre, basilica, and Romanesque church
- Type: Cultural
- Criteria: ii, iii
- Designated: 2000 (24th session)
- Part of: Archaeological Ensemble of Tárraco
- Reference no.: 875-007
- Region: Europe and North America
- Area: 1 ha (0.0039 sq mi)
- Buffer zone: 8 ha (0.031 sq mi)

Spanish Cultural Heritage
- Official name: Anfiteatro
- Type: Non-movable
- Criteria: Monument
- Designated: 5 August 1924
- Reference no.: RI-51-0000298

The Roman Amphitheatre of Tarraco is a Roman amphitheatre in the Roman colonia of Tarraco –present-day Tarragona, Spain–, capital of the Roman province of Hispania Tarraconensis. It was built in the 2nd century AD near the local forum. It measured 130 by 102 metres (427 ft × 335 ft), and it could house up to 15,000 spectators. It was used for gladiatorial fights and combats between beasts or men and beasts.

Currently in ruins, it is part of the Archaeological Ensemble of Tárraco that was declared a World Heritage Site by UNESCO in 2000.

== History ==
The amphitheatre is located by the sea

It was built at the end of 1st century AD and the start of 2nd century AD, down from the walls and facing the sea. There are remains of a large inscription dating to the reign of Elagabalus (3rd century AD) and located in the podium.

In 259, during the persecution of Christians by Emperor Valerian, the city's bishop, Fructuosus, and his deacons, Augurius and Eulogius, were burned alive. After Christianity became the official religion of the empire, the amphitheatre lost its original functions. The following years some of the building's stones were used to build a basilica to commemorate the three martyrs. Tombs were excavated in the arena and funerary mausoleums were annexed to the church.

The Islamic invasion of Spain started a period of abandonment of the area, which lasted until the 12th century, when a church was built over the remains of the Visigothic church, in Romanesque style. This was demolished in 1915.

In 1576, it became the convent for the order of the Trinity until 1780 when it became a prison for prisoners who were constructing the port. After closing the prison, it was abandoned up to the mid-20th century when work was started to recover the theatre, funded by the Bryant Foundation.

== See also ==
- List of Roman amphitheatres
