= List of Bienes de Interés Cultural in the Province of Tarragona =

This is a list of Bien de Interés Cultural landmarks in the Province of Tarragona, Catalonia, Spain.

- Wall of Tarragona
