= Wall of Tarragona =

- Muralla de Tarragona (Catalan)
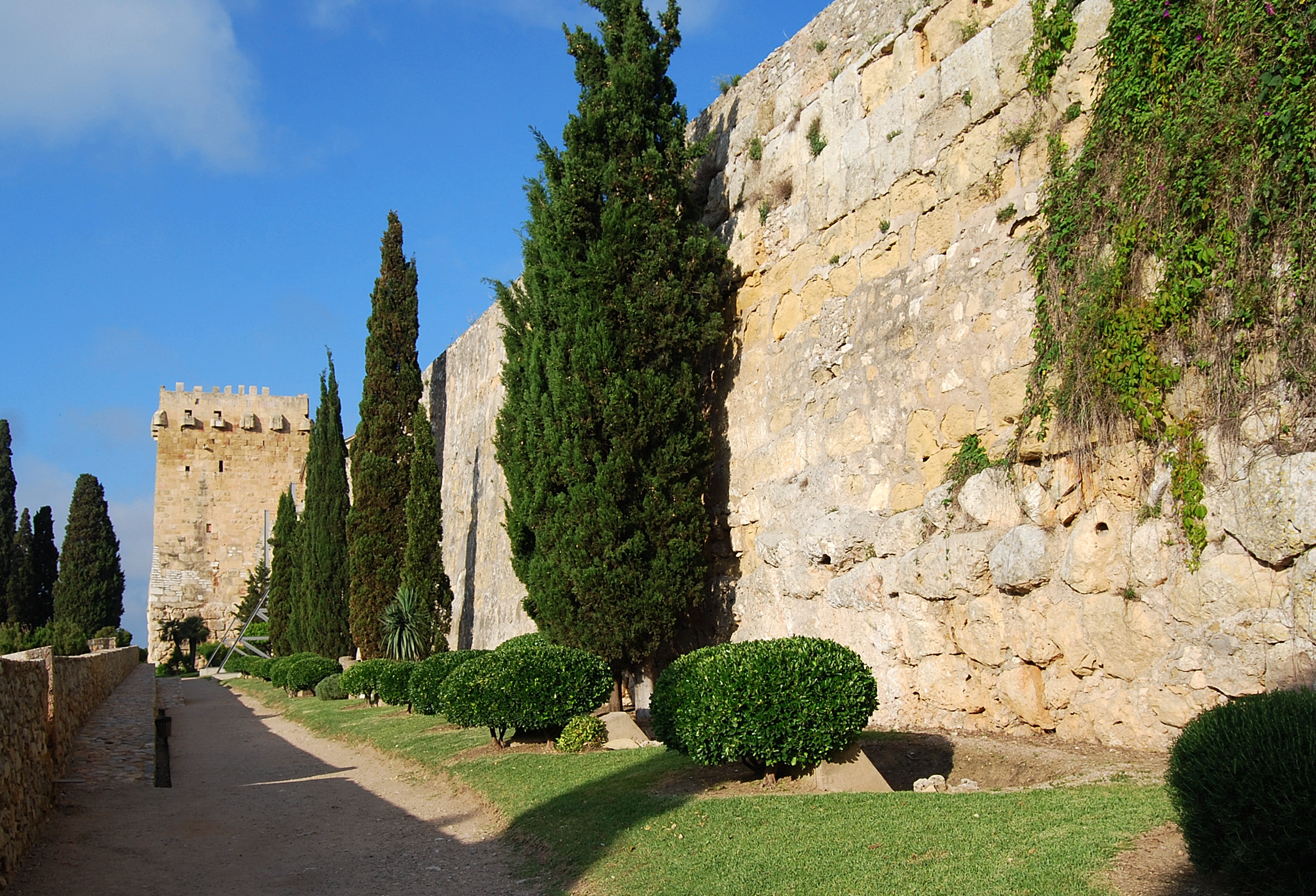

- Location within Catalonia
- 41°7′12.40″N 1°15′33″E
- Location: Tarragona, Catalonia, Spain

UNESCO World Heritage Site
- Official name: Roman walls
- Criteria: Cultural: (ii), (iii)
- Designated: 2000 (24th session)
- Part of: Archaeological Ensemble of Tárraco
- Reference no.: 875-001
- Area: 0.6 ha (65,000 sq ft)

Spanish Cultural Heritage
- Official name: Muralla de Tarragona
- Type: Non-movable
- Criteria: Monument
- Designated: 1884
- Reference no.: RI-51-0000037

The Wall of Tarragona (Catalan and Spanish: Muralla de Tarragona) is a wall located in Tarragona, Catalonia, Spain. It was declared Bien de Interés Cultural in 1884.

== See also ==
- List of Bien de Interés Cultural in the Province of Tarragona
- Portal de Sant Antoni
