= Torre dels Escipions =

UNESCO World Heritage Site
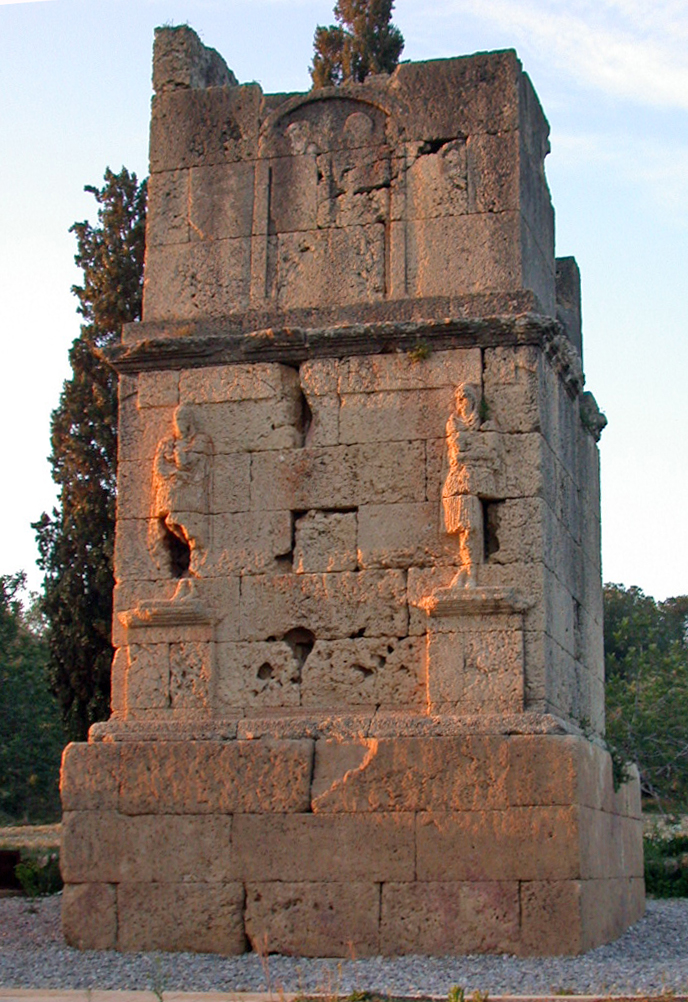

- Location within Catalonia
- Official name: Tower of the Scipios
- Location: Tarragona, Spain
- Part of: Archaeological Ensemble of Tárraco
- Criteria: Cultural: (ii), (iii)
- Reference: 875-010
- Inscription: 2000 (24th Session)
- Area: 0.08 ha (8,600 sq ft)
- Coordinates: 41°7′52.70″N 1°18′59″E

Torre dels Escipions (lit. 'Tower of the Scipios') is a funerary tower built by the Romans on the outskirts of Tarraco, an ancient Roman city that corresponds to the present city of Tarragona (Catalonia, Spain). It is one of the elements of the Archaeological Ensemble of Tarraco, declared a World Heritage Site by UNESCO, the tower being identified with the code 875-010.

== History ==
It was built during the 1st century AD, six kilometers from the city of Tarraco, capital of the Hispania Citerior, in the course of the Via Augusta, the Roman road that crossed the entire peninsula from the Pyrenees to Gades (Cádiz). It is one of the most important funerary monuments of the Roman era that still remains in the Iberian Peninsula.

== Architectural features ==
The funerary tower is a monument with three floors superimposed on a declining basis. It was built with rectangular blocks. In the intermediate body, are two reliefs of the god Phrygian Attis, deity of death and resurrection, son of Pessinunte. On the same level, there is a burial chamber that housed the furnishings of the deceased; at the base it measures 4.40 x 4.70 m.

== Trivia ==
Its name goes back to a misidentification of the two reliefs of the god Attis, that for years were identified as those of the Scipio brothers (Publius and Gnaeus).

== See also ==
- Tarraco
- List of Roman sites in Spain
