= Les Ferreres Aqueduct =

Aqueduct in Tarragona, Catalonia, Spain

Les Ferreres Aqueduct Aqüeducte de les Ferreres
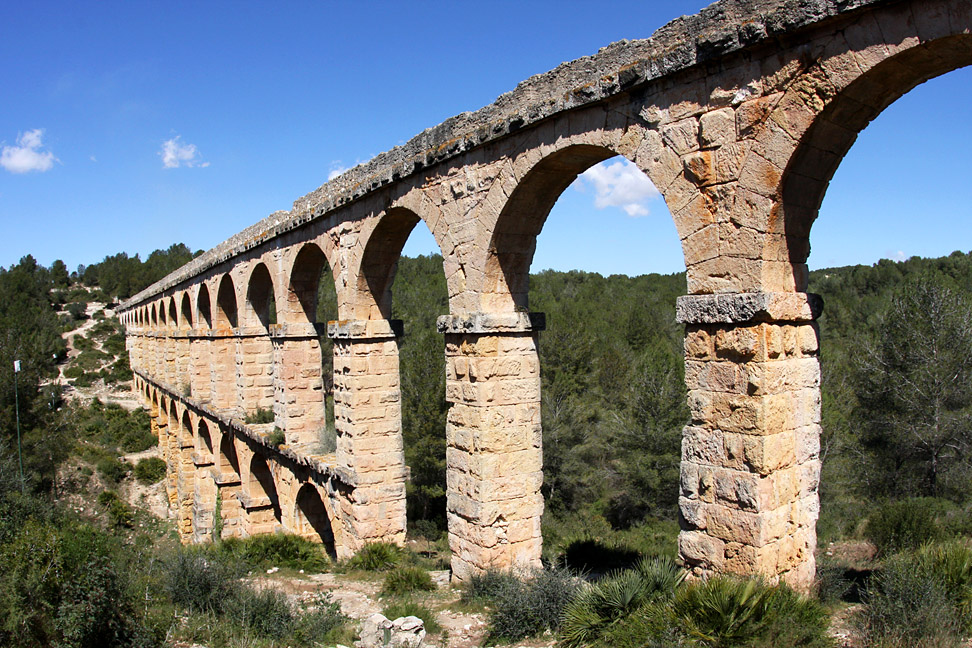
- Aqüeducte de les Ferreres in Tarragona, Catalonia, Spain
- Coordinates: 41°8′48″N 1°14′37″E
- Carries: Aqueduct to Tarraco
- Locale: Tarragona, Catalonia, Spain

Characteristics
- Total length: 249 m
- Height: 27 m (without gallery)
- No. of spans: 25 (upper arcade)

History
- Construction end: Probably reign of Augustus (27 BC–14 AD)
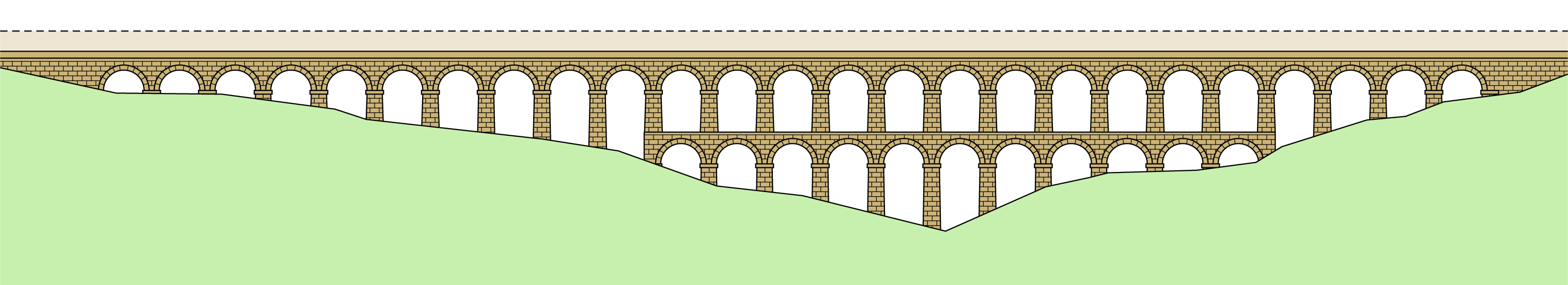
- Elevation

UNESCO World Heritage Site
- Part of: Archaeological Ensemble of Tárraco
- Criteria: Cultural: (ii), (iii)
- Reference: 875-009
- Inscription: 2000 (24th Session)
- Area: 0.4 ha (43,000 sq ft)
- Buffer zone: 71.5 ha (0.276 sq mi)

Location
- Interactive map of Les Ferreres Aqueduct

The Ferreres Aqueduct (Catalan: Aqüeducte de les Ferreres [əkwəˈðuktə ðə ləs fəˈrɛɾəs]), also known as the Pont del Diable ([ˈpɔn(d) dəl diˈabːlə]; English: "Devil's Bridge"), is an ancient bridge, part of one of the Roman aqueducts that supplied water to the ancient city of Tarraco, today Tarragona in Catalonia, Spain. The bridge is located 4 km north of the city and is part of the Archaeological Ensemble of Tarraco (listed as a UNESCO's World Heritage Site since 2000).

The Les Ferreres Aqueduct (Aqüeducte de les Ferreres) or Pont del Diablo near Tarragona, Spain (2024).

The specus of the Les Ferreres Aqueduct (Aqüeducte de les Ferreres) or Pont del Diablo near Tarragona, Spain (2024).

The Les Ferreres Aqueduct (Aqüeducte de les Ferreres) or Pont del Diablo near Tarragona, Spain (2024). (.03)

The Les Ferreres Aqueduct (Aqüeducte de les Ferreres) or Pont del Diablo near Tarragona, Spain (2024). (.02)

== Description ==
The Tarraco aqueduct took water from the Francolí river, 15 km north of Tarragona. It probably dates from the time of the emperor Augustus.

Les Ferreres Aqueduct is composed of two levels of arches: the upper section has 25 arches, and the lower one has 11. All arches have the same diameter of 20 Roman feet (5.9m) with a variation of 15 cm. The distance between centres of the pillars is 26 Roman feet (7.95m). It has a maximum height of 27 metres (89 ft) and a length of 249 metres (817 ft), including the ends where the specus (water channel) runs atop a wall.

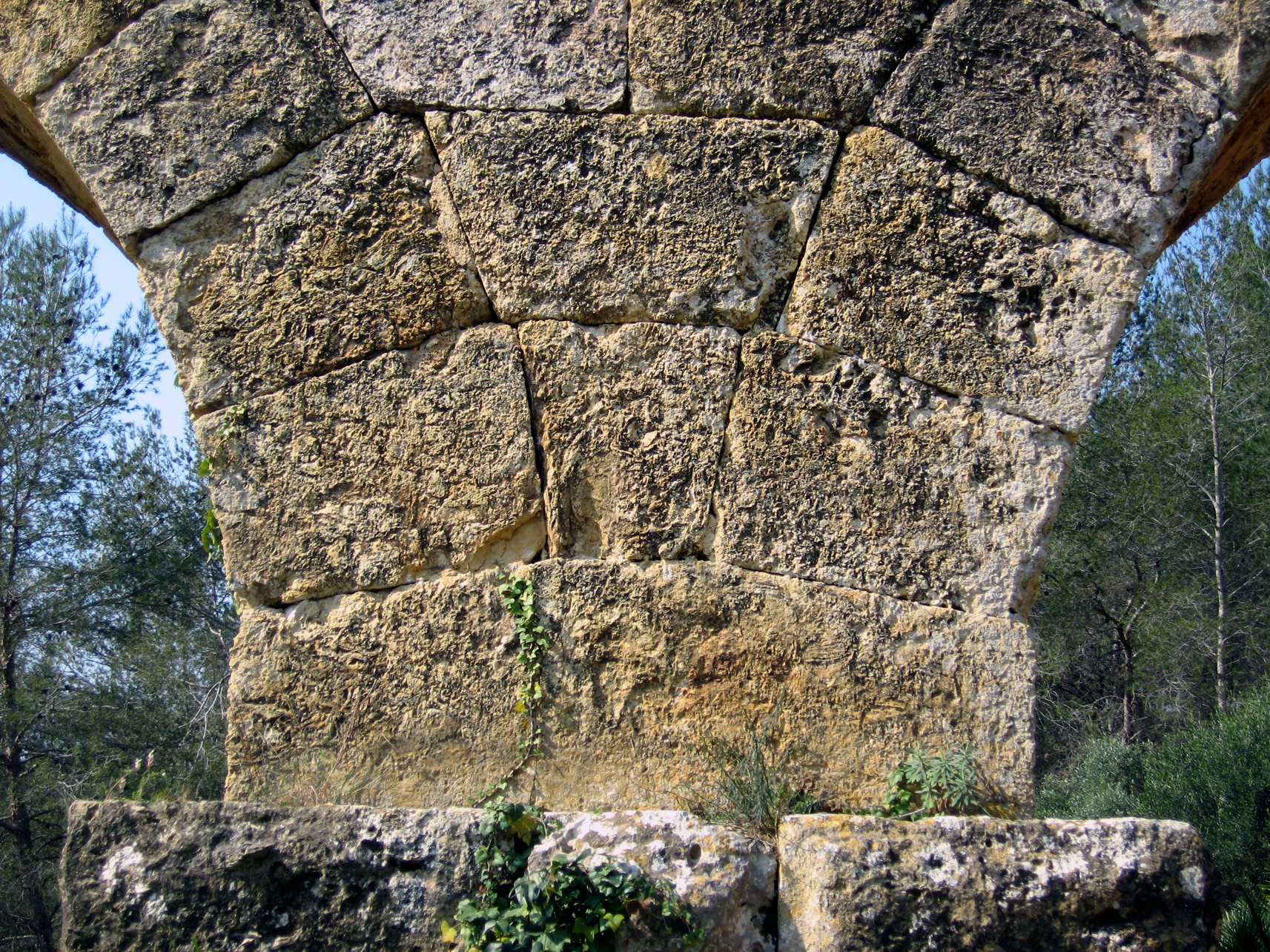
Detail of the aqueduct

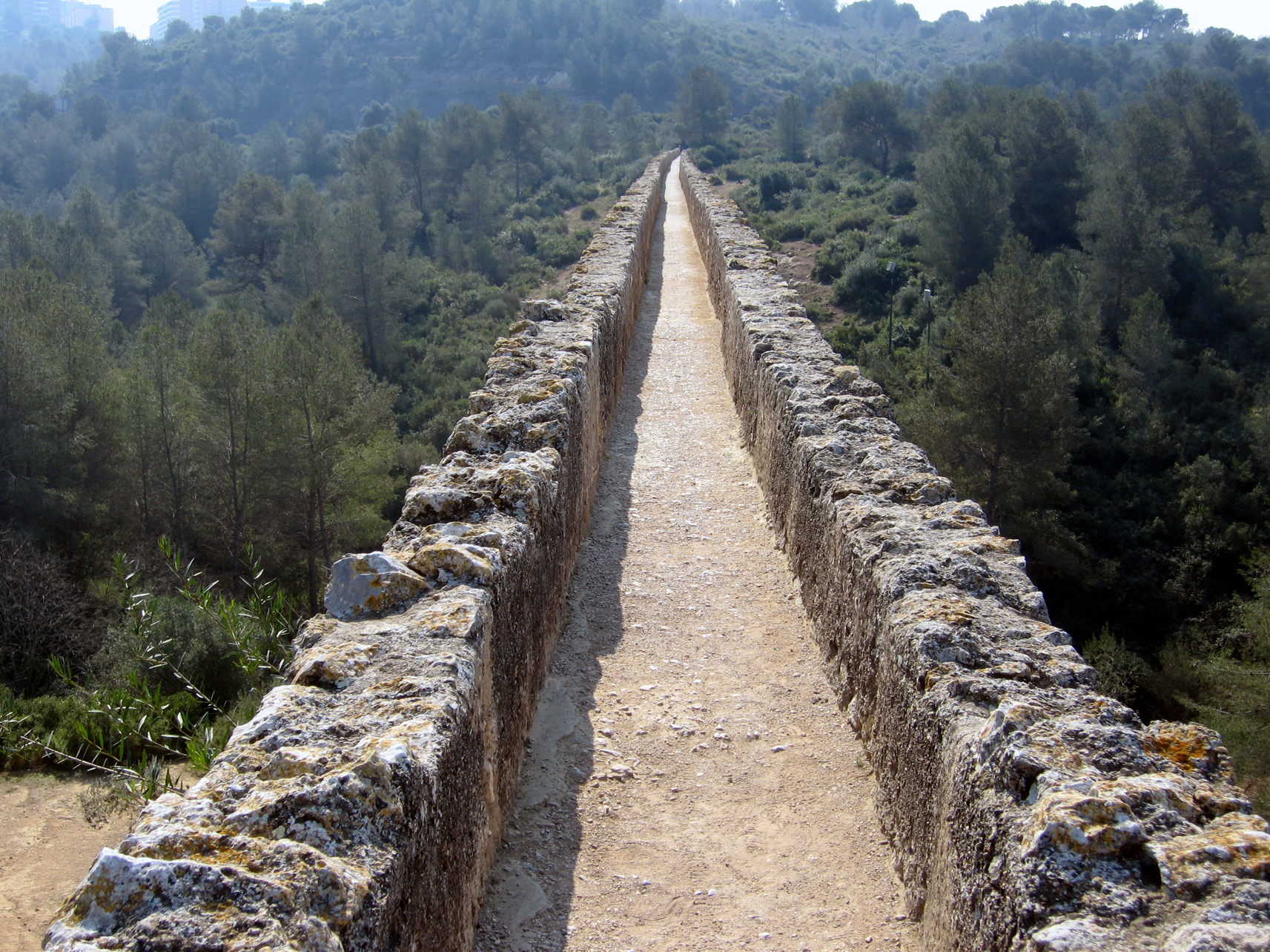
Specus of the aqueduct

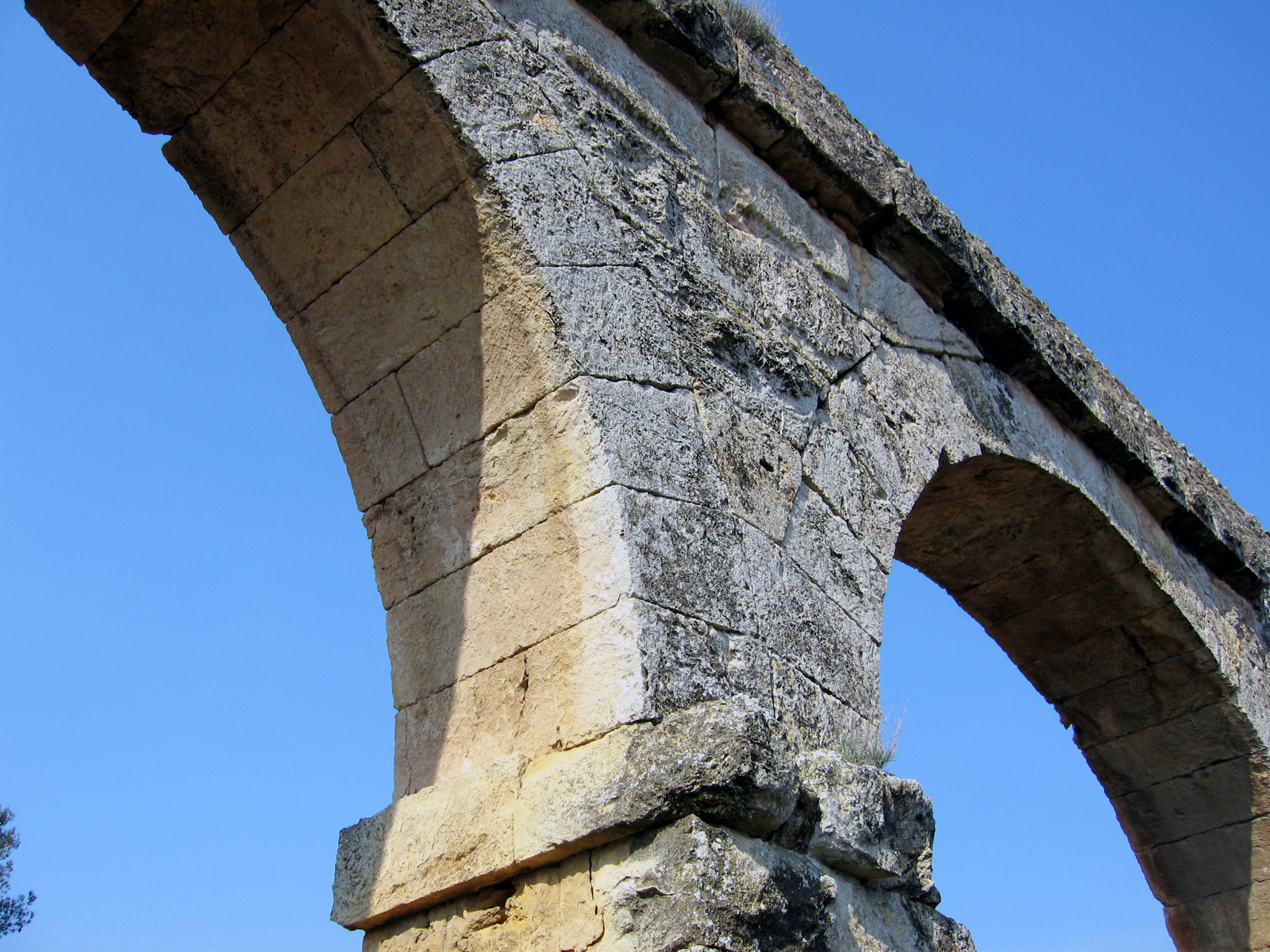
Detail of the aqueduct arches

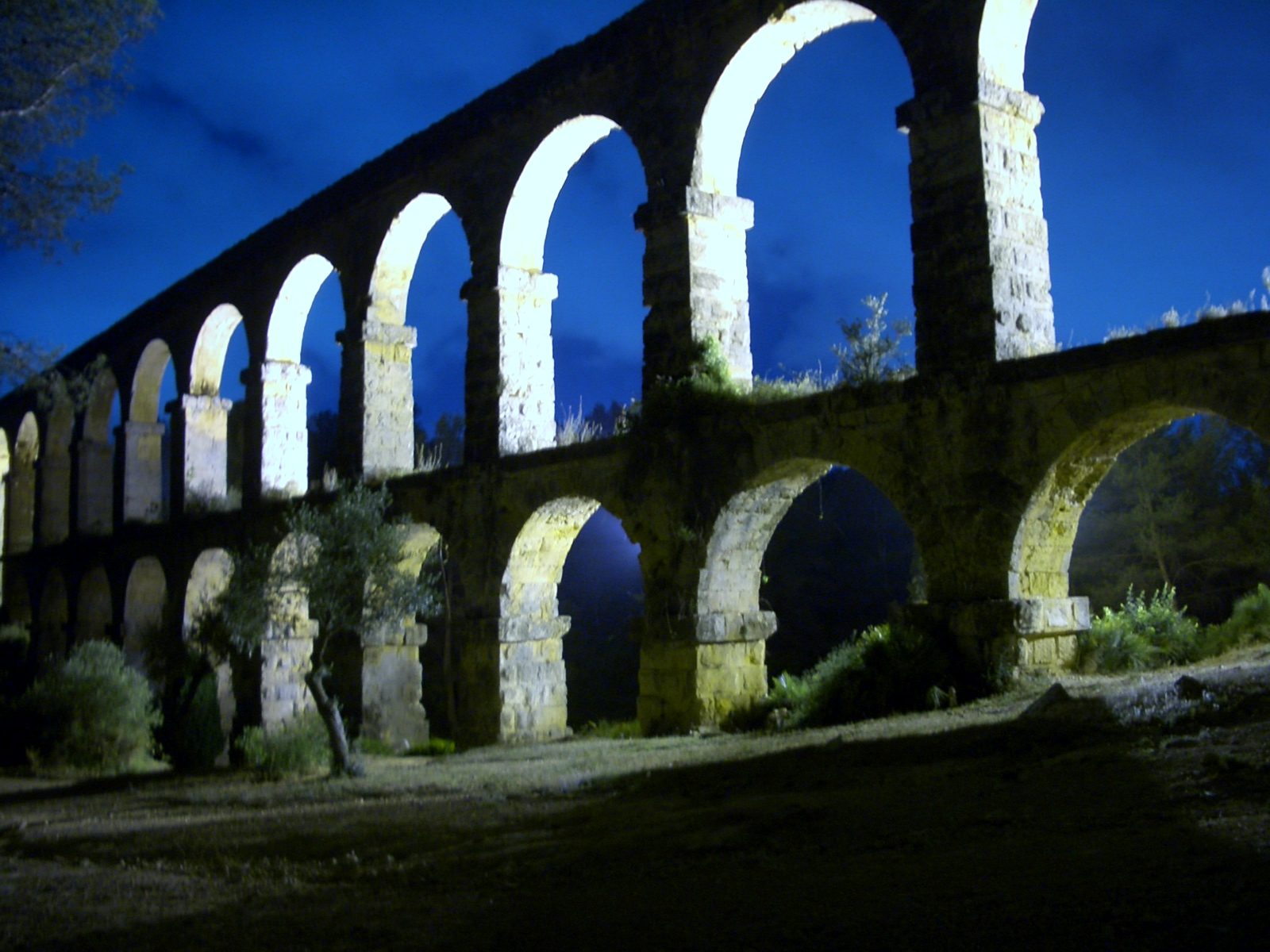
At night

== See also ==
- Roman bridges
- List of Roman aqueduct bridges
