= Colonial forum of Tarraco =

UNESCO World Heritage Site
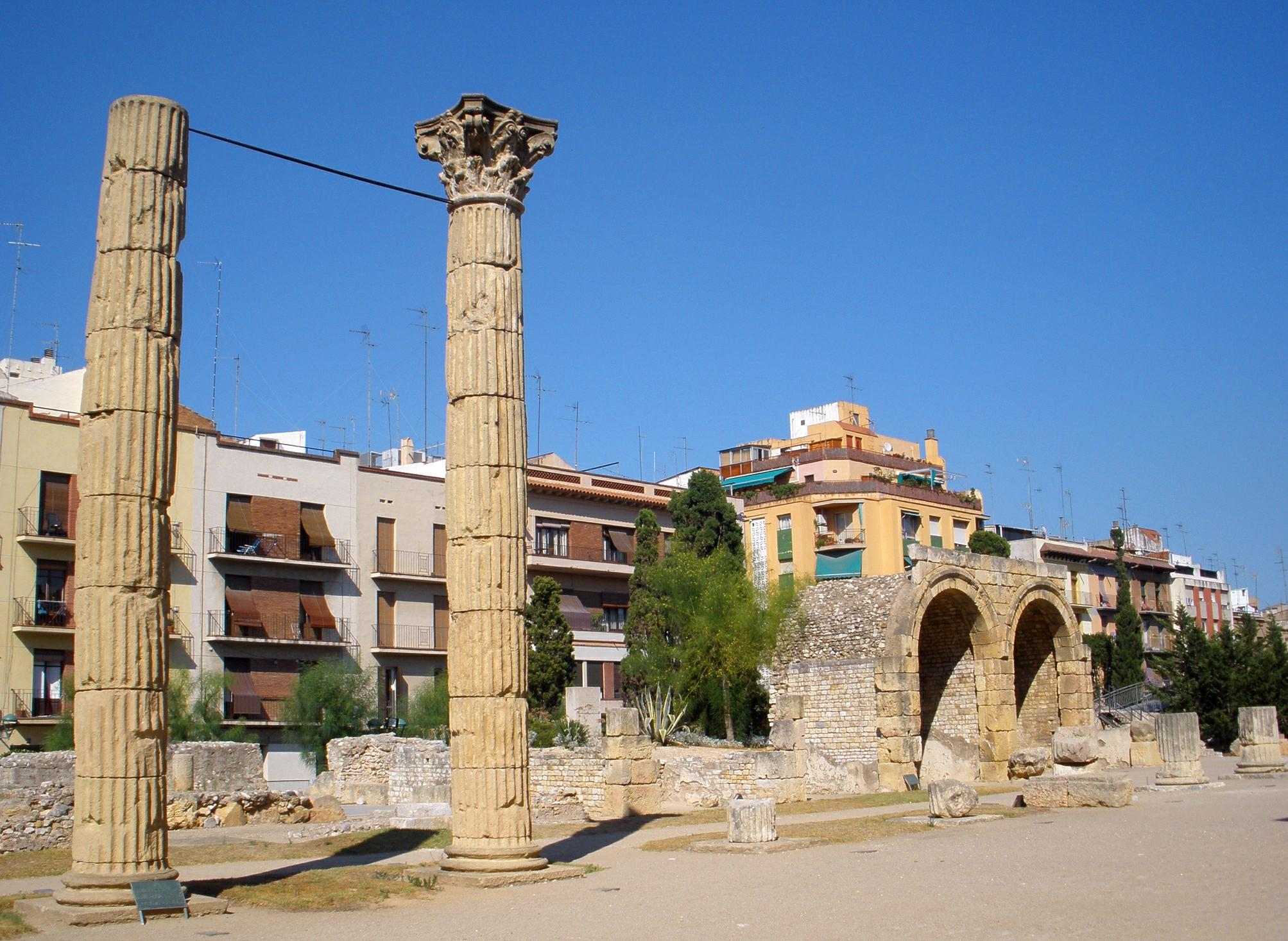
- Ruins of the Roman colonial forum of Tarraco

- Location within Catalonia
- Location: Tarragona, Spain
- Part of: Archaeological Ensemble of Tárraco
- Criteria: Cultural: (ii), (iii)
- Reference: 875-005
- Inscription: 2000 (24th Session)
- Area: 0.6 ha (65,000 sq ft)
- Coordinates: 41°6′52.50″N 1°14′57″E

The colonial forum of Tarraco is an ancient Roman archaeological site located in the modern city of Tarragona in Spain.

It is one of the locations included in the World Heritage Site, inscribed in Cairns on 2 December 2000, known as the Archaeological Ensemble of Tarraco, specifically identified under the code 875-005.

The lower forum of Tarraco was destroyed by fire in Late Antiquity and was not rebuilt. According to Ramón Járrega Domínguez, the existence of the fire that destroyed the area of the lower forum is beyond doubt. He instead suggested, as a working hypothesis, that the destruction may have been connected with the political and military instability surrounding the revolt of Magnentius in the mid-fourth century.
