= Tarragona =

- City and municipality
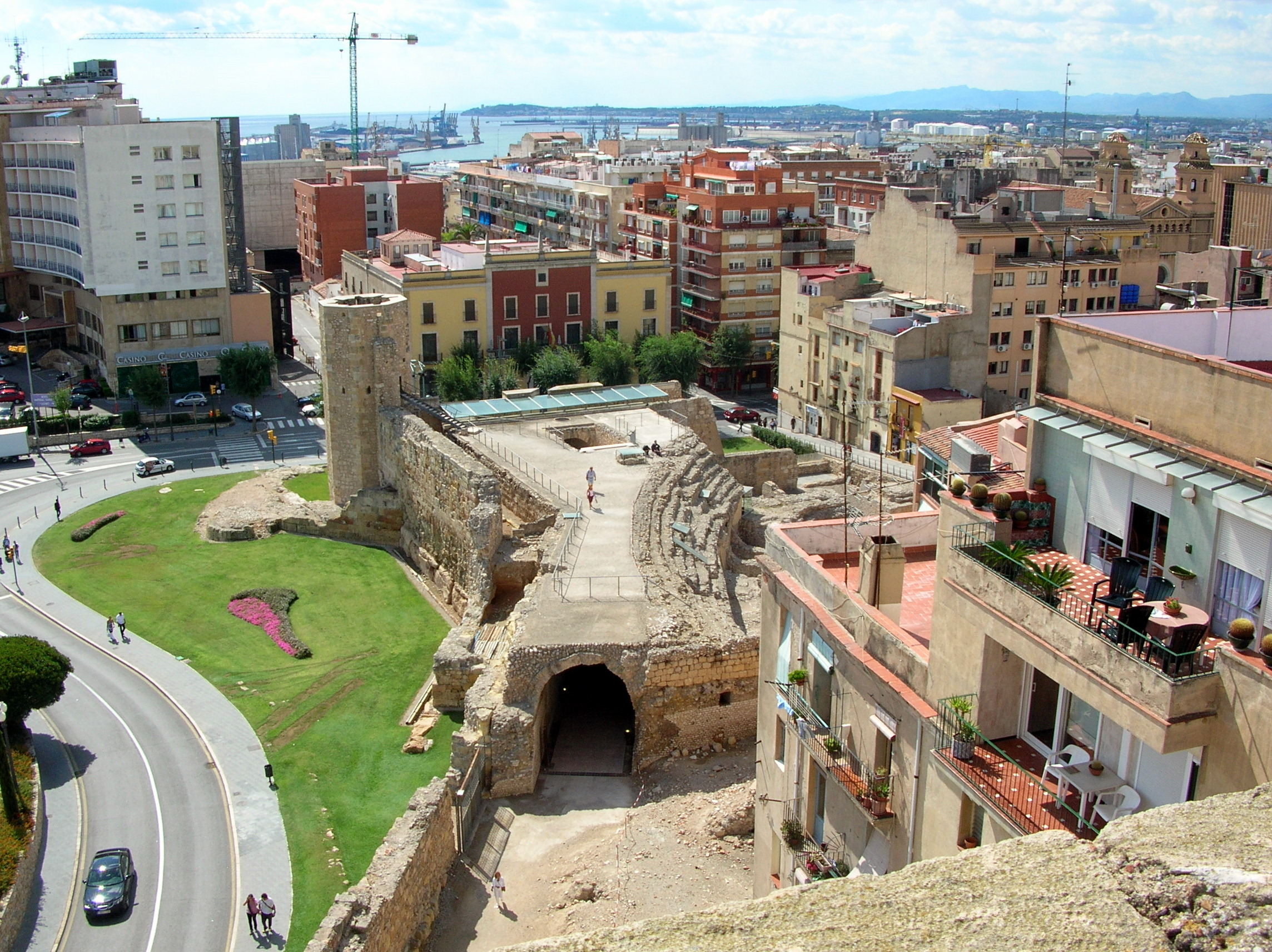
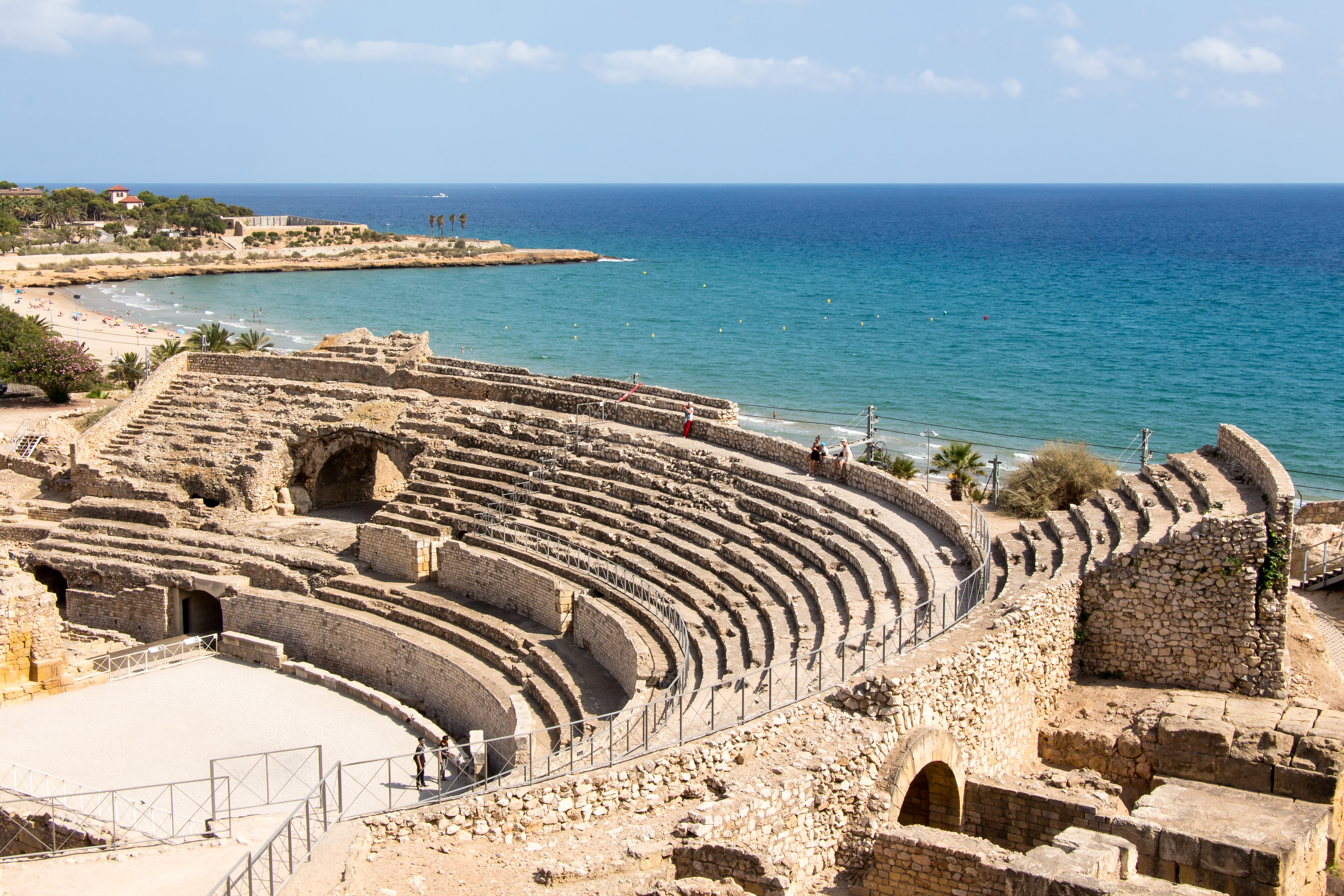
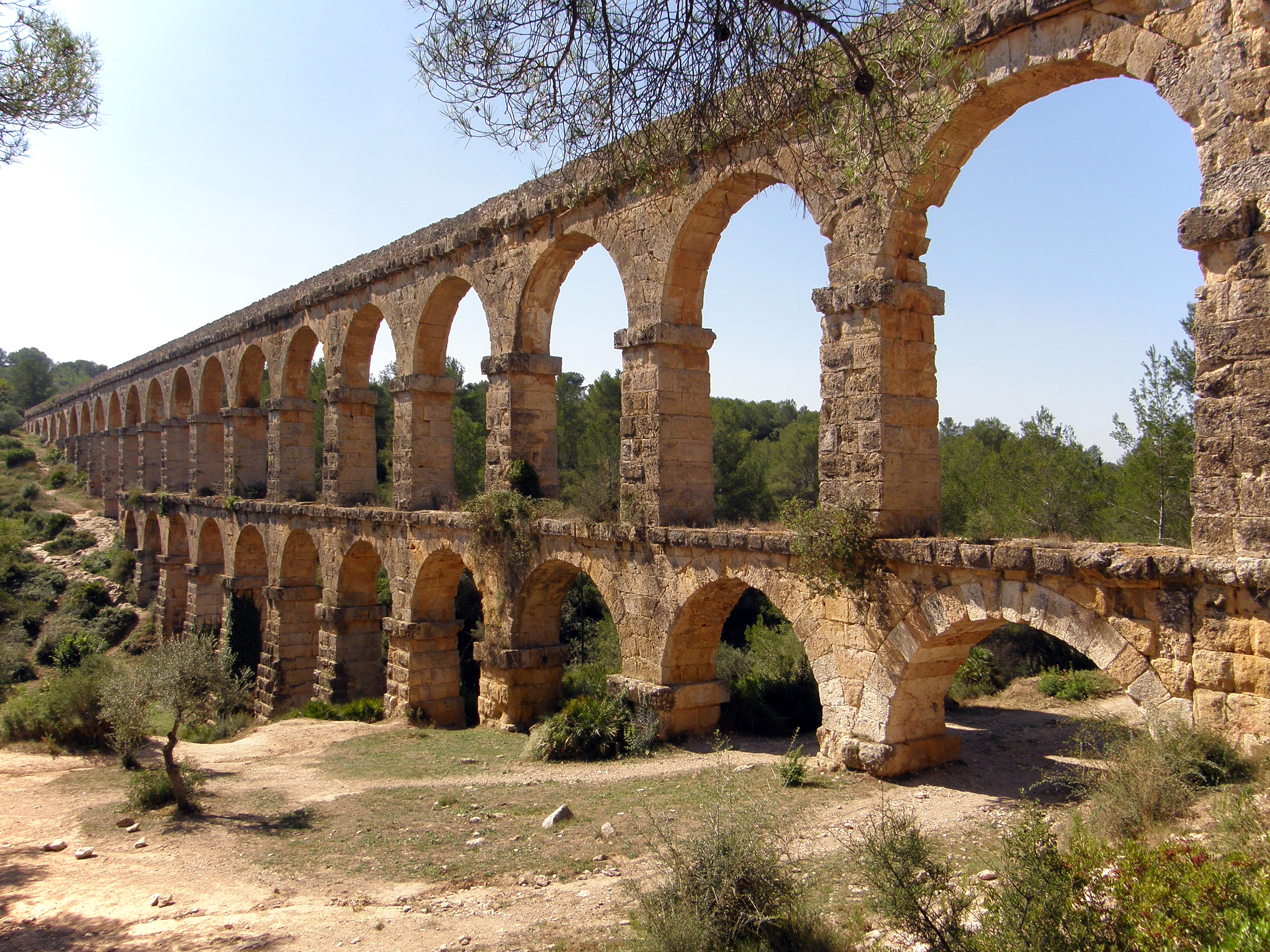
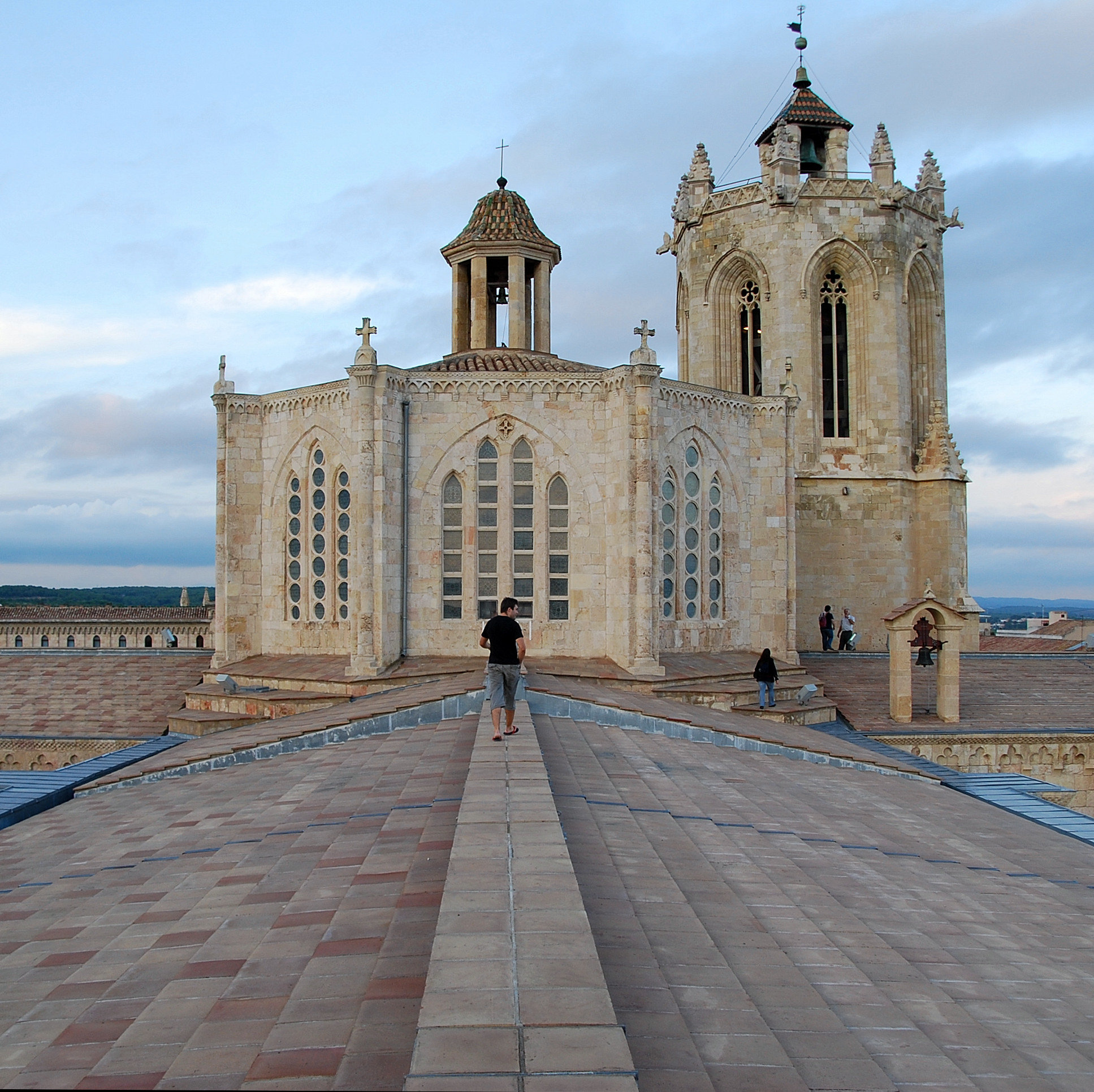
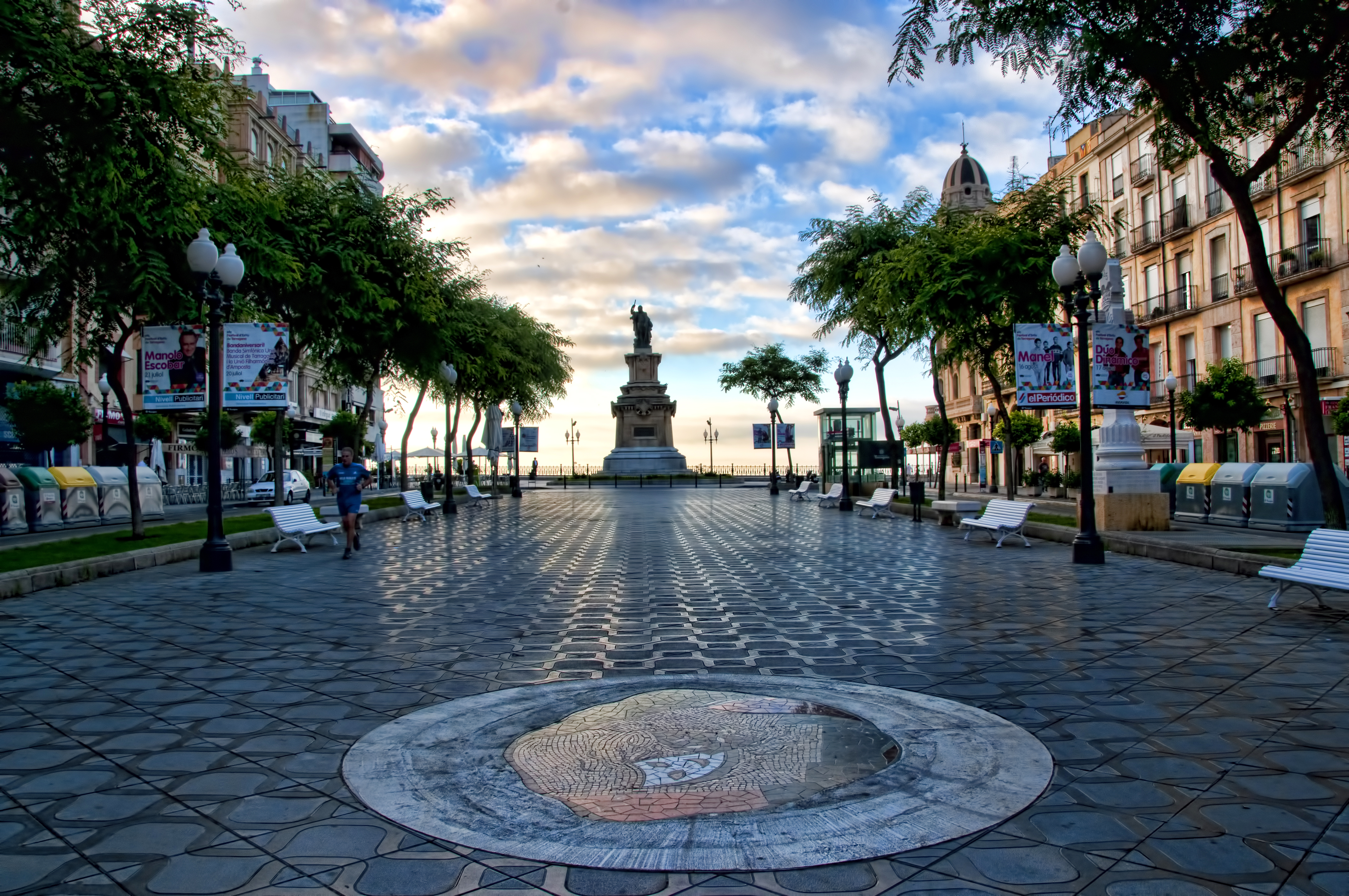
- Panoramic view Amphitheatre Les Ferreres Aqueduct Cathedral Rambla Nova

- Flag Coat of arms
- Location of Tarragona
- Location in Tarragonès county

- Location within Catalonia Location within Spain
- Coordinates: 41°07′03″N 01°15′10″E
- Sovereign state: Spain
- Community: Catalonia
- Region: Camp de Tarragona
- County: Tarragonès
- Province: Tarragona
- Founded: 5th century BC

Government
  - Mayor: Rubén Viñuales (2023) (PSC)

Area
  - Total: 57.9 km^{2} (22.4 sq mi)
- Elevation (AMSL): 68 m (223 ft)

Population (2025)
  - Total: 143,260
  - Density: 2,470/km^{2} (6,410/sq mi)
- Demonym(s): Tarragonian, tarragoní, tarragonina, tarraconense
- Postal code: 43001–43008
- Area code: +34 (E) + 977 (T)
- Climate: Csa
- Website: www.tarragona.cat

Tarragona (Note: Pronunciation of Tarragona: Catalan: [tərəˈɣonə] Spanish: [taraˈɣona]) is a city and municipality in Catalonia, Spain. It is the capital and largest town of Tarragonès county, the Camp de Tarragona region and the province of Tarragona. Geographically, it is located on the Costa Daurada area on the Mediterranean shore, around the mouth of the Francolí.

Developed in a favorable location on a coastal hill by ancient Romans in the context of the Second Punic War near a previous Iberian settlement, Tarraco eventually became the gateway for Roman control of the Iberian Peninsula. It served as the capital, successively, of the provinces of Hispania Citerior and Hispania Tarraconensis and also became a bishopric seat. Urban continuity is presumed to have been the norm in the 8th century following its integration into Al-Andalus. The Camp de Tarragona later turned into a borderland, and the city was abandoned by Muslims by the mid 10th century. Early Christian repopulation of the city and its hinterland in the 12th century took the form of an autonomous principality, before its 1173 full integration into the Principality of Catalonia and the Crown of Aragon.

The Archaeological Complex of Tàrraco is a UNESCO World Heritage Site.

== History ==
=== Mythical origins ===
One Catalan legend holds that Tarragona was named for Tarraho, eldest son of Tubal in c. 2407 BC; another (derived from Strabo and Megasthenes) attributes the name to 'Tearcon the Ethiopian', a seventh-century BC pharaoh who campaigned in Spain. The real founding date of Tarragona is unknown.

=== Theories of origin ===
The city's origins trace back to a possible Iberian settlement known as Kesse or Kosse, named after the local Iberian tribe, the Cossetans. However, the exact connection of Tarragona to Kesse remains uncertain. Scholars such as William Smith suggest that the city may have been established by the Phoenicians, who referred to it as Tarchon. According to Samuel Bochart, signifies a citadel. The moniker likely stemmed from its location atop a high rock, approximately 75–90 m (250–300 ft) above sea level; earning it the epithet arce potens Tarraco. It was seated on the river Sulcis or Tulcis (modern Francolí), on a bay of the Mare Internum (Mediterranean), between the Pyrenees and the River Iberus (modern Ebro). Livy mentions a portus Tarraconis; and according to Eratosthenes it had a naval station or roads (Ναύσταθμον); but Artemidorus Ephesius says with more probability that it had none, and scarcely even an anchoring place; and Strabo himself refers to it as "harbourless" (ἀλίμενος).

=== Rome ===
Tarraco lies on the main road along the northeastern coast of the Iberian Peninsula. During the Roman Republic, the city was fortified and much enlarged as a Roman colony by the brothers Publius Cornelius Scipio and Gnaeus Cornelius Scipio Calvus, who converted it into a fortress and arsenal against the Carthaginians. The city was first named Colonia Iulia Urbs Triumphalis Tarraco and was capital of the province of Hispania Citerior. Subsequently, it became the capital (conventus iuridicus) of the province named after it, Hispania Tarraconensis.

Augustus wintered at Tarraco after his Cantabrian campaign, and bestowed many marks of honour on the city, among which were its honorary titles of Colonia Victrix Togata and Colonia Julia Victrix Tarraconensis.

According to Mela, it was the richest town on the coast, and Strabo represents its population as equal to that of Carthago Nova (now Cartagena). Its fertile plain and sunny shores are celebrated by Martial and other poets; and its neighbourhood is described as producing good wine and flax. The city also minted coins.

An inscribed stone base for a now lost statue of Tiberius Claudius Candidus was found in Tarragona during the nineteenth century. The 24-line Latin inscription describes the governor and senator's career as an ally of the future Roman emperor Septimius Severus, who fought in the civil war following the assassination of Commodus in 192 AD. This important marble block was purchased by the British Museum in 1994.

=== From the demise of the Roman Empire to the union of Spain ===
After the demise of the Western Roman Empire, the city was captured by the Vandals and the Visigoths. The Visigothic Kingdom's rule of Tarracona was ended by the Umayyad conquest of Hispania in 714. The Muslims named it تركونة (Tarkūnah). It was an important border city of the Caliphate of Córdoba between 750 and 1013. After the demise of the Caliphate, it was part of the Taifa of Zaragoza between 1013 and 1110 and under the control of the Almoravid dynasty between 1110 and 1117. It was taken by the County of Barcelona in 1117. From 1129 to 1173 Tarragona was the capital of the short lived Principality of Tarragona, under the Norman-influence. After the dynastic union of Aragon and Barcelona, it was part of the Principality of Catalonia within the Crown of Aragon from 1164 to 1714. After dynastic union of Aragon and the Crown of Castile, it remained a part of the Crown of Aragon until the foundation of the Spanish Empire in 1516.

During the Reapers' War, Tarragona was captured by Catalan insurgents with French support in 1641, but it was retaken by Spanish troops in 1644. It was captured by allied Portuguese, Dutch, and British troops in 1705 during the War of the Spanish Succession and remained in their hands until the Treaty of Utrecht in 1713. During the war, the Catalans supported the unsuccessful claim of Archduke Charles, Duke of Teschen against the victorious Bourbon Duke of Anjou, who became Philip V of Spain. He signed the Nueva Planta decrees, which abolished the Crown of Aragon, as well as the Catalan institutions and prohibited the administrative use of Catalan language on 16 January 1716.

=== Jewish history ===
The Jewish community in Tarragona was established during the Roman era, making it one of the most ancient Jewish communities in Spain. A laver, possibly used by the Jews for ritual purification found in Tarragona bears the inscription "peace over Israel, over ourselves, and our children." Coins with Hebrew inscriptions have also been found, dating to the Visigoth period. During Muslim rule, Jews in Tarragona prospered; Muhammad al-Idrisi nicknamed Tarragona "the city of the Jews."

After the Christian reconquest, the Jews of Tarragona faced institutional persecution and anti-semitic restrictions until the community's destruction in 1492, during the expulsion of the Jews.

=== Peninsular War ===
During the Peninsular War, in the first siege of Tarragona from 5 May to 29 June 1811, Louis-Gabriel Suchet's Army of Aragon of the First French Empire laid siege to a Spanish garrison led by Lieutenant General Juan de Contreras. A British naval squadron commanded by Admiral Edward Codrington harassed the French besiegers with cannon fire and transported large numbers of reinforcements into the city by sea. Nevertheless, Suchet's troops stormed into the defences and killed or captured almost all the defenders. It became a subprefecture centre in Bouches-de-l'Èbre department of French empire.

In the second siege of Tarragona (3–11 June 1813), an overwhelming Anglo-Spanish force under the command of Lieutenant general John Murray, 8th Baronet failed to wrest Tarragona from a small Franco-Italian garrison led by Brigadier general Antoine Marc Augustin Bertoletti. Murray was subsequently removed from command for his indecisive and contradictory leadership. The Anglo-Spanish forces finally captured Tarragona on 19 August.

=== Spanish Civil War ===
During the Spanish Civil War, Tarragona was in the hands of the Second Spanish Republic until captured by Franco's Nationalist troops on 15 January 1939 during the Catalonia Offensive.

== Main sights ==
=== Ancient remains ===
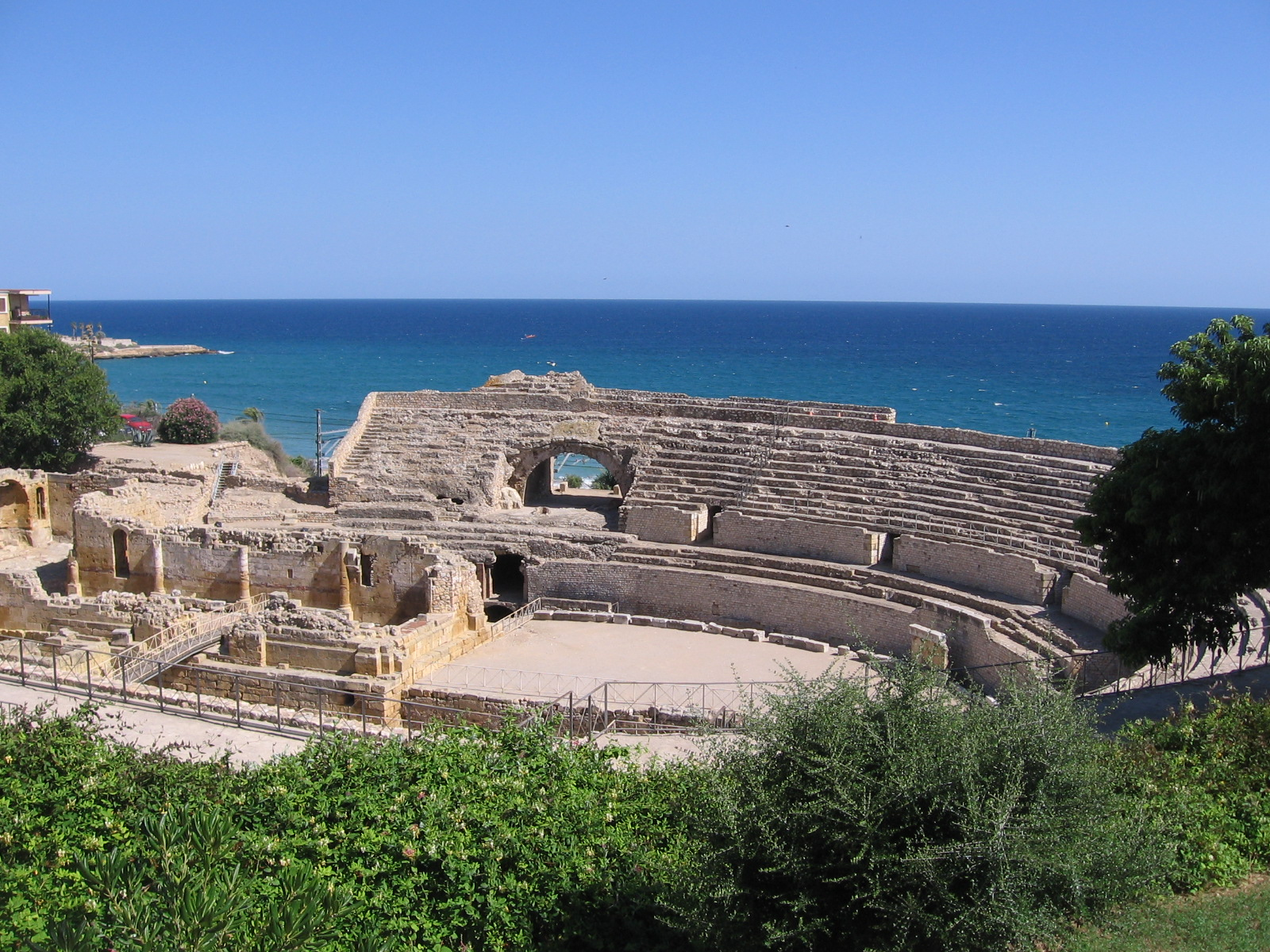
Amphitheatre of Tarragona and the Mediterranean Sea

The Roman ruins of Tarraco have been designated a World Heritage Site by UNESCO.

Part of the bases of large Cyclopean walls near the Cuartel de Pilatos are thought to pre-date the Romans. The building just mentioned, a prison in the 19th century, is said to have been the palace of Augustus. The second century Tarragona Amphitheatre near the seashore was extensively used as a quarry after the fall of the Western Roman Empire, and but few vestiges of it now remain. A circus c. 450 m (1,480 ft) long, was built over in the area now called Plaça de la Font, though portions of it are still to be traced. Throughout the town Latin, and even apparently Phoenician, inscriptions on the stones of the houses mark the material used for buildings in the town.

Two ancient monuments, at some little distance from the town, have, however, fared rather better. The first of these is Les Ferreres Aqueduct, which spans a valley about 4 km (2 mi) north of the city. It is 217 m (712 ft) in length, and the loftiest arches, of which there are two tiers, are 26 m (85 ft) high. There is a monument about 6 km (4 mi) along the coast road east of the city, commonly called the "Tower of the Scipios"; but there is no authority for assuming that they were buried here.

Other Roman buildings include:

- The Roman walls
- The capitol, or citadel
- The Amphitheatre
- The Roman circus
- The Pretorium – Tower
- The Provincial and Colonial fora
- The Necropolis
- The palace of Augustus, called the house of Pilate
- The so-called tower, or sepulchre, of the Scipios
- Arch of Sura, or of Bara
- The Aurelian Way.

The city is also home to the National Archaeological Museum of Tarragona.

=== Religious buildings ===
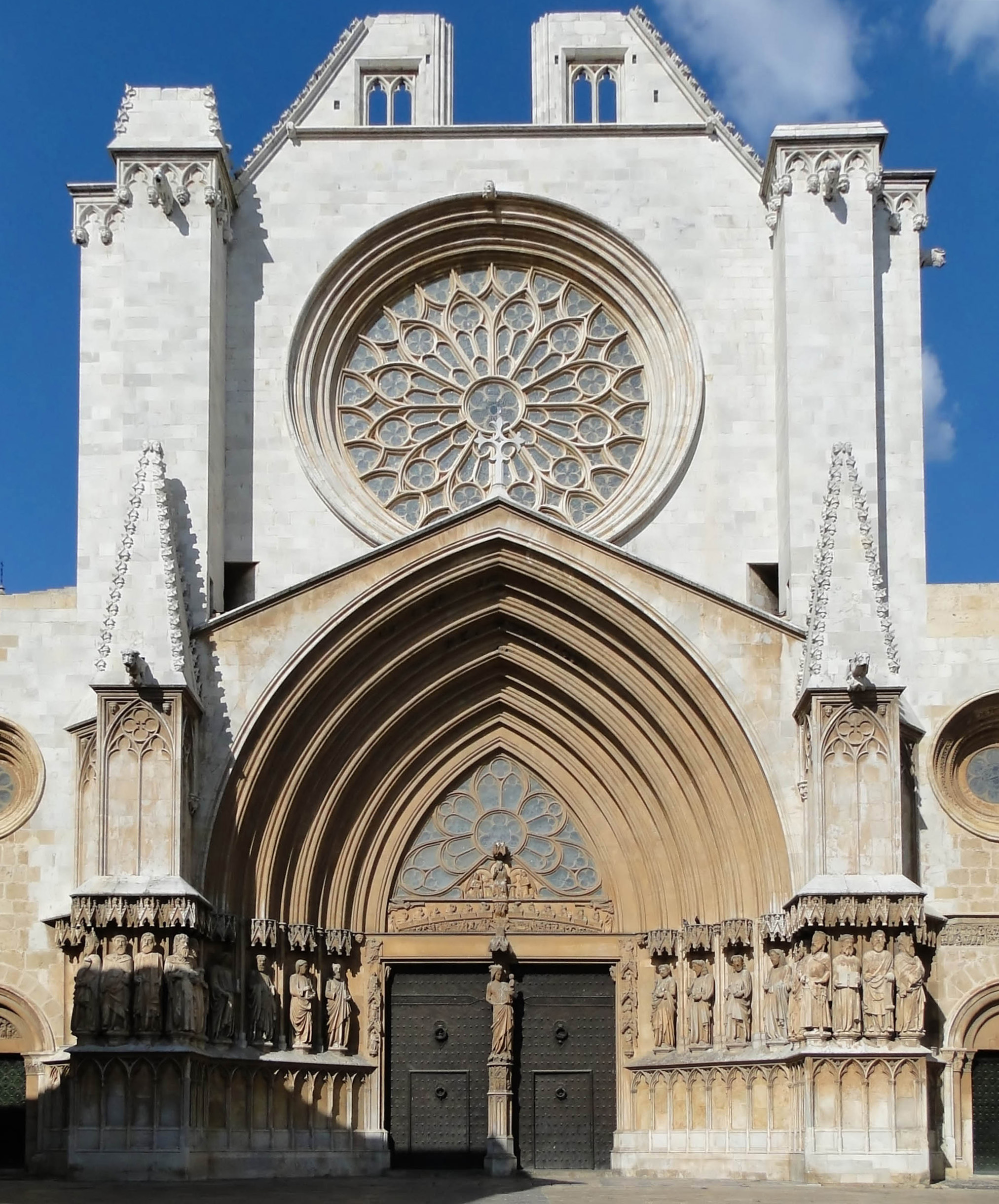
Tarragona Cathedral

- The Tarragona Cathedral, dating to the 12th–13th centuries, combining Romanesque and Gothic architectural elements.
- The convent of the Poor Clares, near the walls
- The convent of Santa Teresa
- The church of the Order of Friars Minor Capuchin, the parish church of the port
- The former convent of Sant Francesc
- The Jesuit college was turned into barracks; their church, however, has been restored to them
- The convent of the Dominican Order, now the town hall
- The archiepiscopal palace, situated on the site of the ancient capitol, one tower of which still remains. It was rebuilt in the 19th century.
- Near the sea, in the Roman amphitheatre, are the remains of a church called Santa Maria del Miracle (Holy Mary of the Miracle), which belonged to the Knights Templar. It was afterwards used by the Trinitarian Order and was later converted into a penitentiary. It was demolished around 1915.

The seminary of Sant Pau and Santa Tecla was founded in 1570 by the cardinal archbishop, Gaspar Cervantes de Gaeta, and was the first to comply with the decrees of the Council of Trent. In 1858 Archbishop José Domingo Costa y Borrás built a fourth wing. Benito Villamitjana built a new seminary behind the cathedral in 1886, in the courtyard of which stands the old chapel of Sant Pau. Pope Leo XIII raised this to the rank of a pontifical university.

50 km (31.07 mi) north of the city is Poblet Monastery, founded in 1151 by Ramon Berenguer IV, Count of Barcelona, which was used for sepultures of the kings.

== Economy ==
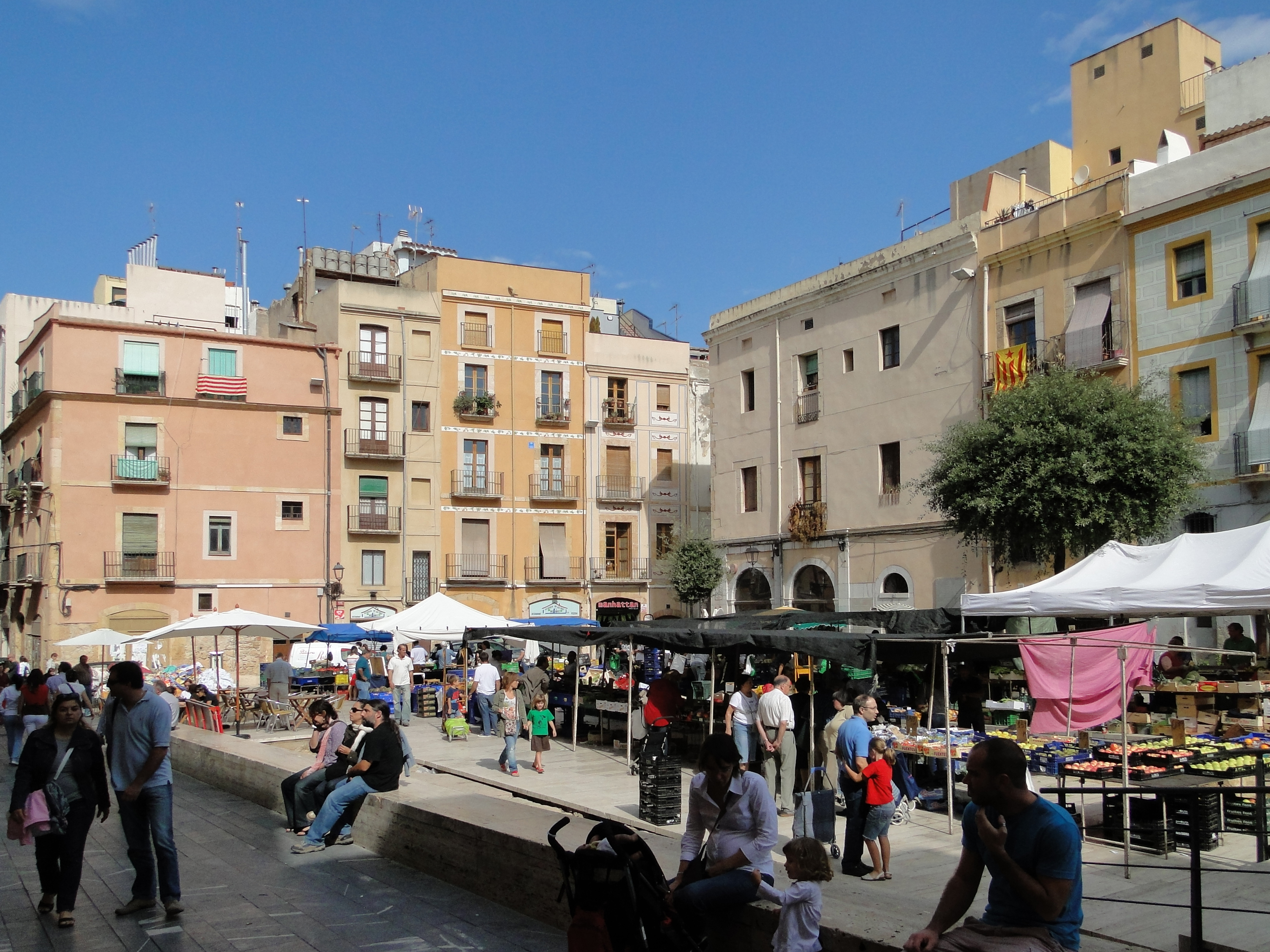
Plaça del Fòrum.

Tarragona is home to one of the largest ports in Spain, which is an export hub for the Spanish car industry.

Much of its economic activity comes from a number of chemical industries located west of the city. One quarter of all the chemical production in Spain is found in Tarragona. In 2025 this industry employed some 5,800 people. The industrial park is home to, amongst others, Ercros.

Rovira i Virgili University is here.

The most significant living heritage is the Popular Retinue, a great parade of dances, bestiary and spoken dances, as well as the building of human towers called castells. These cultural traditional are especially visible during the Santa Tecla Festival, and are so popular in Tarragona that they have their own home called the "Casa de la Festa", Festivities House, which can be visited all year.

A number of beaches, some awarded a Blue Flag designation, line the Mediterranean coast near the city.

Tarragona is located near the resort of Salou and the PortAventura World (PortAventura Park, the most visited theme park in Spain, Ferrari Land and also the PortAventura Caribe Aquatic Park).

The city is served by Camp de Tarragona high-speed railway station, and is located a few kilometres away from Reus Airport, which offers low-cost charter-flights (over a million passengers per year).

Reus is the second city of the Tarragona area (101,767 inhabitants in 2006), known by its commercial activity and for being the place where the architect Antoni Gaudí was born.

The city hosted the 2018 Mediterranean Games, one year later than planned, because of political and economical instability.

== Tourism ==
Tarragona is one of the World Heritage Journeys in the European Union. Tourism is focused on the main sites of Mercat Central de Tarragona (Central Market of Tarragona), La Rambla Nova (the main shopping street), El Serrallo fishing village, the surrounding beaches of the golden coast, the key plazas (Plaça de la Font, Plaça del Fòrum, Plaça del Rei), Balcó del Mediterrani, Praetorium and Roman Circus, Roman Amphitheatre, Model of Roman Tarraco, and the cathedral. PortAventura World theme park resort complex is nearby.

The GR 92 long-distance footpath, which roughly follows the length of the Mediterranean coast of Spain, has a staging point at Tarragona. Stage 25 links northwards to Torredembarra, a distance of 20.0 km (12.4 mi), whilst stage 26 links southwards to Cambrils, a distance of 28.1 km (17.5 mi).

== Cuisine ==
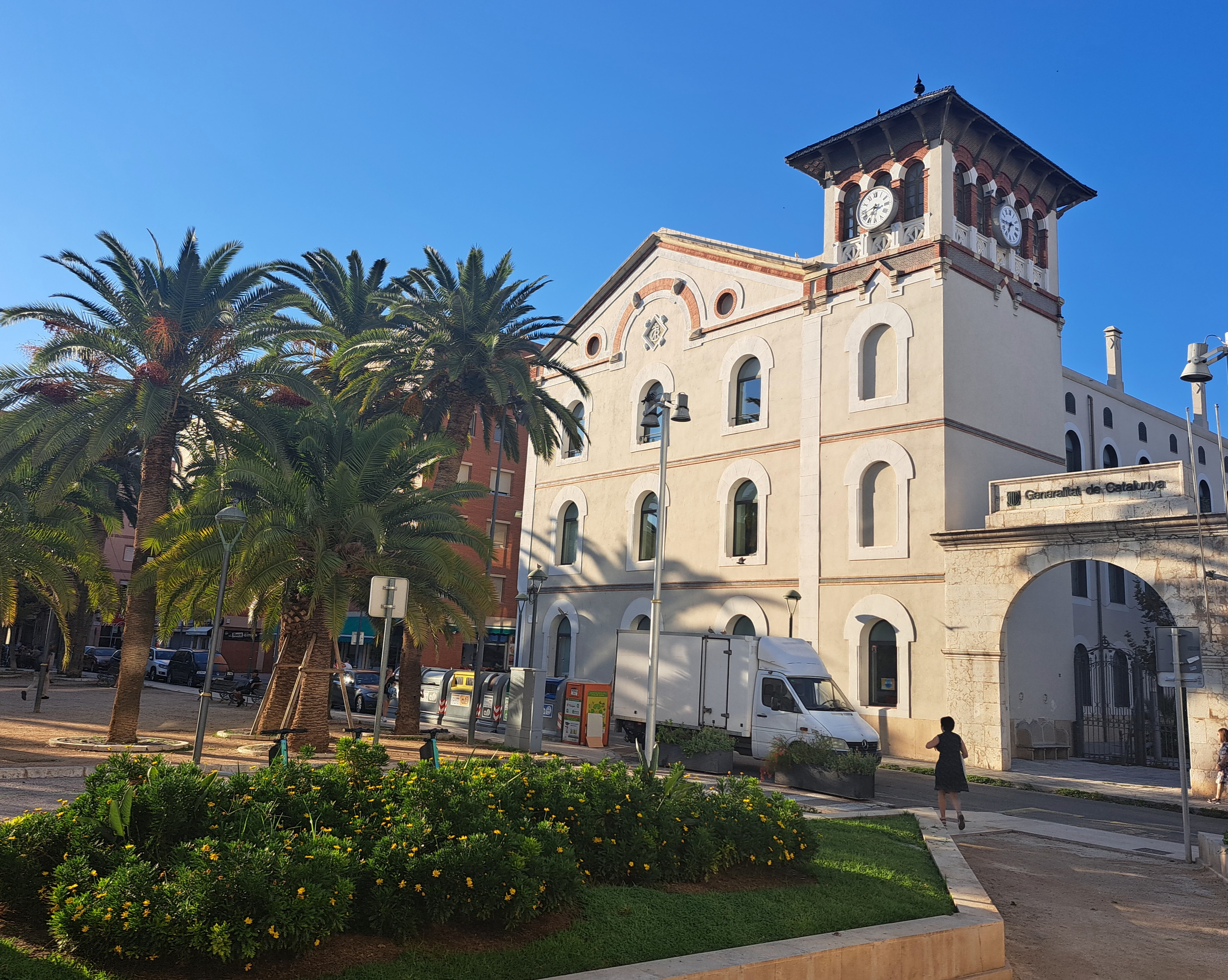
Historical building of early 20th century factory of Chartreuse liqueur in Tarragona

Tarragona contains a number of small bars, restaurants, and cafes serving tapas and sandwiches, and local seafood and Catalan dishes like "pa amb tomàquet" or "neules i torrons". Many such outlets are found in the historic centre, including those at the Plaça de la Font, Plaça del Rei and Plaça del Fòrum. The neighborhood of El Serrallo, at the harbour, specialises in seafood cuisine.

Chartreuse liqueur is a famous local drink of Tarragona. Originally created in 1605, it was considered by monks to be an "elixir for long life". It is produced in yellow, with an alcohol content of 40º, as well as green, with a content of 55º. Between 1903 and 1989, the Chartreuse liqueur made by the French Carthusian Monks was distilled in Tarragona, following the monks' expulsion from France. Chartreuse is now a key part of the Feast of Santa Tecla. This traditional festival of national interest celebrates the patroness saint of the city.

== Climate ==
The climate of Tarragona can be described as a Mediterranean climate (Köppen Csa) bordering on a humid subtropical climate (Cfa). Despite its location in the Mediterranean region, August tends to have more precipitation than February, which is unusual for the Mediterranean climate. Winters are mildly cool and summers are warm and sultry, while the wettest seasons are spring and autumn, which receive around 54 to 77 mm (2.1 to 3.0 in) in May and September.

Climate data for Vila-seca (1971–2000) town in Tarragona province, (14 km (8.70 mi) south-west of Tarragona
Month	Jan	Feb	Mar	Apr	May	Jun	Jul	Aug	Sep	Oct	Nov	Dec	Year
Record high °C (°F)	20.8 (69.4)	24.0 (75.2)	28.2 (82.8)	29.1 (84.4)	30.6 (87.1)	31.3 (88.3)	34.5 (94.1)	35.2 (95.4)	33.3 (91.9)	30.7 (87.3)	25.5 (77.9)	25.0 (77.0)	35.2 (95.4)
Mean daily maximum °C (°F)	12.4 (54.3)	15.2 (59.4)	17.8 (64.0)	19.5 (67.1)	22.1 (71.8)	25.6 (78.1)	29.3 (84.7)	30.2 (86.4)	27.6 (81.7)	22.4 (72.3)	16.4 (61.5)	12.7 (54.9)	21.0 (69.8)
Daily mean °C (°F)	10.0 (50.0)	11.9 (53.4)	14.1 (57.4)	15.9 (60.6)	18.8 (65.8)	22.5 (72.5)	25.9 (78.6)	26.7 (80.1)	24.0 (75.2)	19.1 (66.4)	13.9 (57.0)	10.7 (51.3)	17.8 (64.0)
Mean daily minimum °C (°F)	7.5 (45.5)	8.7 (47.7)	10.4 (50.7)	12.2 (54.0)	15.5 (59.9)	19.4 (66.9)	22.5 (72.5)	23.2 (73.8)	20.3 (68.5)	15.8 (60.4)	11.3 (52.3)	8.7 (47.7)	14.7 (58.5)
Record low °C (°F)	−1.6 (29.1)	−1.0 (30.2)	0.6 (33.1)	4.5 (40.1)	9.0 (48.2)	12.6 (54.7)	16.0 (60.8)	14.3 (57.7)	13.0 (55.4)	7.3 (45.1)	2.7 (36.9)	−1.0 (30.2)	−1.6 (29.1)
Average precipitation mm (inches)	37.2 (1.46)	19.1 (0.75)	36.6 (1.44)	38.2 (1.50)	53.2 (2.09)	33.3 (1.31)	15.7 (0.62)	52.8 (2.08)	68.2 (2.69)	63.7 (2.51)	46.9 (1.85)	44.7 (1.76)	509.0 (20.04)
Average precipitation days (≥ 1 mm)	5.0	3.5	4.8	5.8	6.1	3.9	2.7	4.3	4.8	5.8	5.0	5.1	56.8
Source: Servei Meteorològic de Catalunya

Climate data for Reus Airport (Reus city in Tarragona province) (1991–2010), extremes (1952-present)
Month	Jan	Feb	Mar	Apr	May	Jun	Jul	Aug	Sep	Oct	Nov	Dec	Year
Record high °C (°F)	24.7 (76.5)	25.0 (77.0)	27.7 (81.9)	30.2 (86.4)	33.4 (92.1)	36.8 (98.2)	38.8 (101.8)	39.8 (103.6)	34.5 (94.1)	32.5 (90.5)	28.8 (83.8)	23.7 (74.7)	39.8 (103.6)
Mean daily maximum °C (°F)	14.5 (58.1)	15.4 (59.7)	17.7 (63.9)	19.7 (67.5)	23.1 (73.6)	27.1 (80.8)	29.8 (85.6)	30.2 (86.4)	26.7 (80.1)	22.9 (73.2)	18.0 (64.4)	15.0 (59.0)	21.7 (71.0)
Daily mean °C (°F)	9.2 (48.6)	9.9 (49.8)	12.2 (54.0)	14.3 (57.7)	17.8 (64.0)	21.8 (71.2)	24.7 (76.5)	25.2 (77.4)	21.7 (71.1)	17.9 (64.2)	12.8 (55.0)	9.8 (49.6)	16.4 (61.6)
Mean daily minimum °C (°F)	3.8 (38.8)	4.3 (39.7)	6.6 (43.9)	8.9 (48.0)	12.4 (54.3)	16.5 (61.7)	19.6 (67.3)	20.1 (68.2)	16.7 (62.1)	12.8 (55.0)	7.6 (45.7)	4.6 (40.3)	11.2 (52.1)
Record low °C (°F)	−7.6 (18.3)	−8.0 (17.6)	−5.4 (22.3)	−2.5 (27.5)	3.6 (38.5)	7.4 (45.3)	10.5 (50.9)	10.8 (51.4)	5.5 (41.9)	0.2 (32.4)	−4.0 (24.8)	−7.5 (18.5)	−8.0 (17.6)
Average precipitation mm (inches)	29 (1.1)	24 (0.9)	34 (1.3)	41 (1.6)	45 (1.8)	22 (0.9)	15 (0.6)	37 (1.5)	73 (2.9)	73 (2.9)	48 (1.9)	34 (1.3)	475 (18.7)
Average precipitation days (≥ 1 mm)	3.7	3.1	3.9	5.0	4.8	2.9	2.1	3.1	4.9	5.6	4.6	3.8	47.5
Average snowy days	0.1	0.1	0.1	0	0	0	0	0	0	0	0	0	0.3
Average relative humidity (%)	68	66	65	65	63	60	60	63	67	72	70	70	66
Mean monthly sunshine hours	167	178	211	231	264	294	319	276	222	189	165	158	2,674
Source: Agencia Estatal de Meteorología

== Events ==
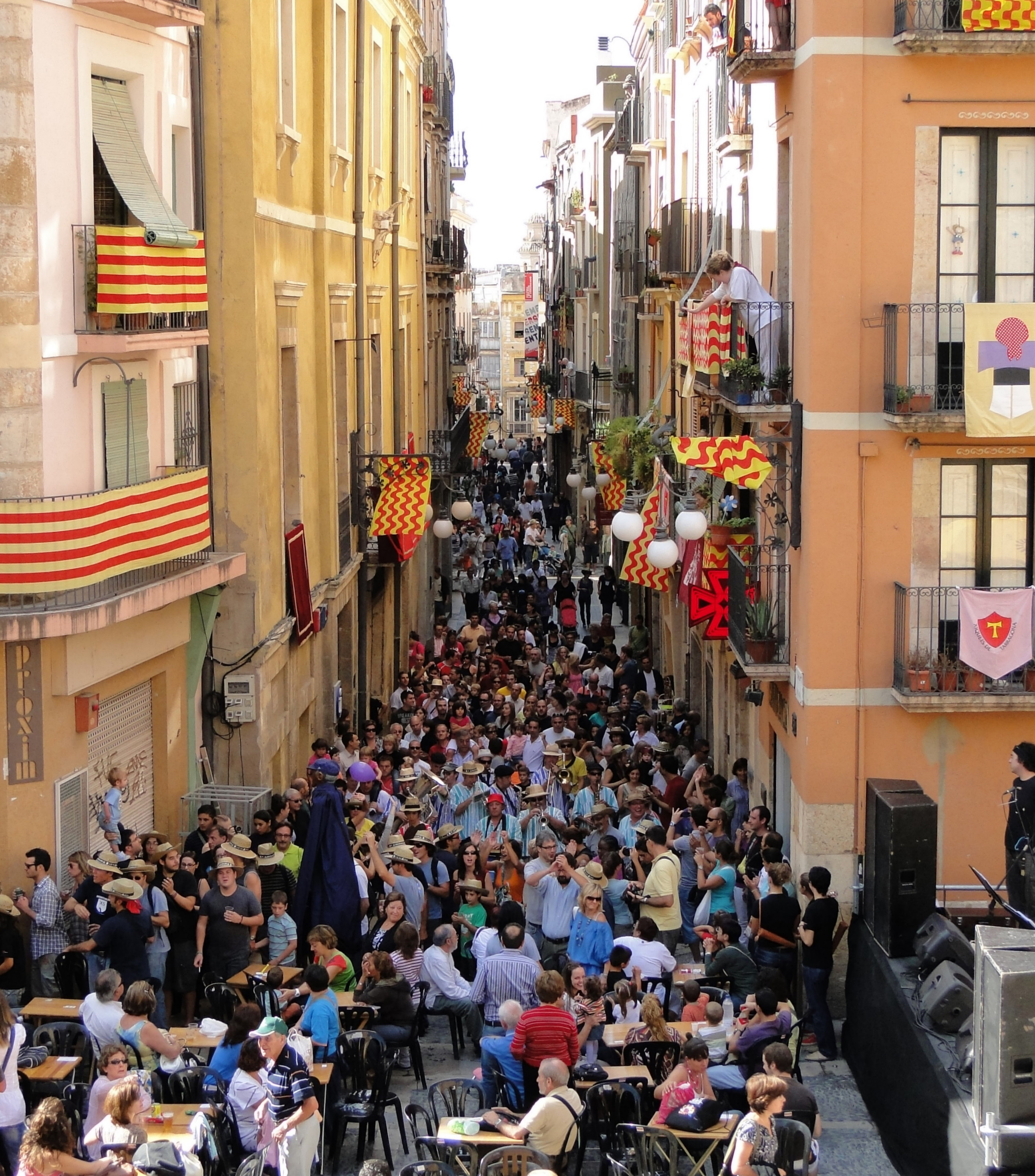
Carrer Major during Santa Tecla Festival

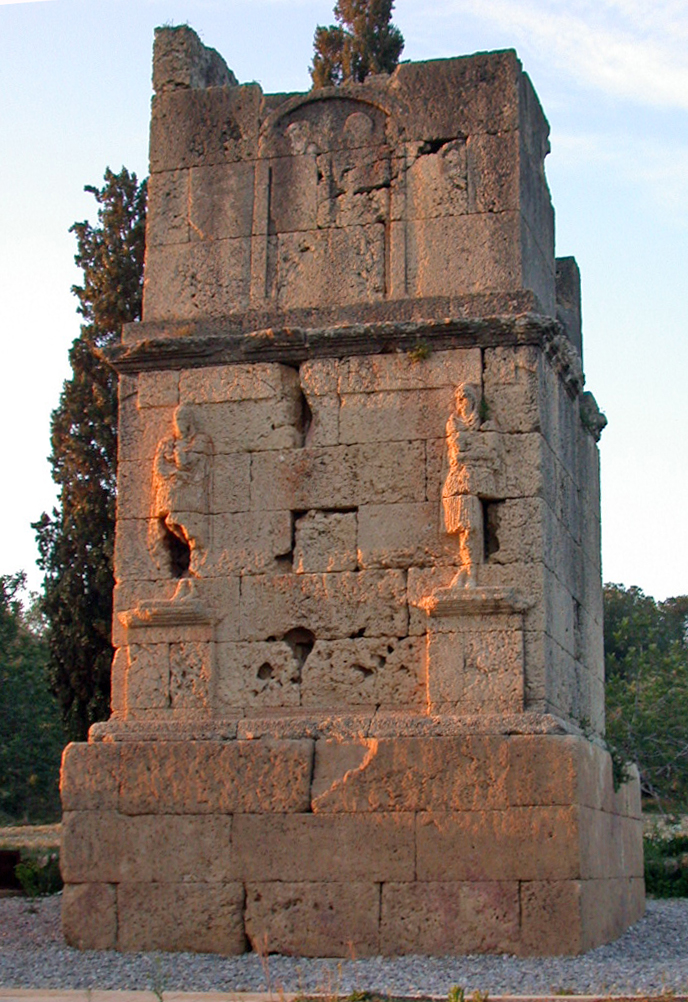
Torre dels Escipions

- The Carnival
- Tarragona International Dixieland Festival. Houses 25 bands and 100 concerts and activities the week before Holy Week.
- Tarraco Viva. An international cultural festival dedicated to the history of the Roman period, with musical concerts, exhibitions, workshops and conferences.
- Tarragona International Fireworks Displays Competition. The competition selects six international pyrotechnic companies every year. Official website1
- Sant Magí Festival, held between 15 and 19 August.
- Santa Tecla Festival, held between 15 and 24 September. It has been celebrated since 1321 and it is considered of national touristic interest by the state.
- Tarragona 2018 XVIII Mediterranean Games, an international multi-sport event held from 22 June to 1 July 2018.

Tarragona was also a candidate to be the Spanish representative as European Capital of Culture in 2016.

== Politics ==
The local mayor is elected by the members of the plenary from among its members the day the new municipal corporation is formed after the local election. The officeholder has a mandate for the 4-year duration of the elected body. If the mayor leaves office ahead of time a new voting may take place among the plenary members in order to invest a new mayor (meanwhile, another local councillor, conventionally the first deputy mayor may act as acting mayor). Since 15 June 2019 the mayor is Pau Ricomà. The opening session in which the mayor is invested is traditionally held at the Saló de Plens.

List of mayors

Since the first democratic election after the Francoist dictatorship, Tarragona has had five democratically elected mayors:

- Josep Maria Recasens (PSC): 1979–1989
- Joan Miquel Nadal (CiU): 1989–2007
- Josep Fèlix Ballesteros (PSC): 2007–2019
- Pau Ricomà (ERC): 2019–2023
- Rubén Viñuales (PSC): 2023–present

The local is the body formed by the elected councillors of the Ajuntament. The plenary meetings (Ple) are held at the Saló de Plens. It is formed by the municipal councillors, elected through closed party list proportional representation and 27 councillors are currently elected on the basis of the population of the municipality. Councillors are grouped in municipal groups on the basis of their political filiation. It has a government commission (Comissió de Govern; also Junta de Govern or Junta de Gobierno) is formed by the mayor, the deputy mayors, and a number of appointed councillors.

== Twin towns and sister cities ==
Tarragona is twinned with:

Avignon, France, since 1968; Alghero, Italy, since 1972; Orléans, France, since 1978; Stafford, United Kingdom, since 1992	Klagenfurt, Austria, since 1996; Pushkin, Russia, since 1997; Pompei, Italy, since 2006

Tarragona had partnerships with:

- Voiron, France

== Notable people ==
- Domènec Batet (1872–1937), military general
- Alejandro Cao de Benós (born 1974), political activist

== See also ==
- Archaeological Ensemble of Tarraco
- Roman Catholic Archdiocese of Tarragona
- Royal Tarragona Yacht Club
- Gimnàstic de Tarragona
