= List of Roman theatres =

Roman theatres built during the Roman period may be found all over the Roman Empire. Some were older theatres that were re-worked.

List
Name	City (Roman name)	City (modern name)	Country	Coordinates	Diameter of the cavea	Notes References	Photographs
Theatre at Apollonia	Apollonia	Pojani	Albania	40°43′0″N 19°28′0″E	51.5 metres (169 ft)	Entry in Theatrum database	
Theatre at Buthrotum	Buthrotum	Butrint	Albania	39.745690°N 20.020518°E	24 metres (79 ft)	Entry in Theatrum database	Theater at Buthrotum
South-west theatre at Byllis	Byllis		Albania	40.5403°N 19.7375°E	80.5 metres (264 ft)	Pre-Roman origins; Entry in Theatrum database	South-west theatre at Byllis
Theatre at Hadrianopolis	Hadrianopolis	Sofratikë	Albania	39.996392°N 20.224705°E	58 metres (190 ft)	Entry in Theatrum database	Theater at Hadrianopolis
Theatre at Oricum	Oricum	Orikum	Albania	40.319142°N 19.429726°E	34 metres (112 ft)	pre-Roman origins; Entry in Theatrum database	Theatre at Oricum
Theatre at Phoinike	Phoenice	Finiq	Albania	39.913490°N 20.056434°E		Possibly pre-Roman origins; Entry in Theatrum database	Theatre at Phoinike
Roman theatre of Guelma	Calama	Guelma	Algeria	36°28′N 7°26′E	58 metres (190 ft)	Entry in Theatrum database	Theatre at Guelma
Theatre at Cuicul	Cuicul	Djémila	Algeria	36°19′N 5°44′E	62 metres (203 ft)	Entry in Theatrum database	Theatre at Cuicul
Theatre at Hippo Regius	Hippo Regius	Annaba	Algeria	36°54′N 7°46′E	100 metres (330 ft)	Position approximate; Entry in Theatrum database	
Theatre at Iol Caesarea	Iol Caesarea	Cherchell	Algeria	36°36′36″N 2°11′48″E	130 metres (430 ft)	Entry in Theatrum database	Theatre at Iol Caesarea
Theatre at Madauros	Madauros		Algeria	36.078175°N 7.901234°E	33 metres (108 ft)	Entry in Theatrum database	
Theatre at Rusicade	Rusicade	Skikda	Algeria	36.879580°N 6.905181°E		Entry in Theatrum database	
Theatre at Thubursicum	Thubursicum	Khamissa	Algeria	36.19408°N 7.65607°E	70 metres (230 ft)	Entry in Theatrum database	
Theatre at Bregenz	Brigantium	Vorarlberg	Austria	47°30′1.66″N 9°44′52.36″E	50 metres (160 ft)	in Theatrum database	Bregenz-Roman theater-01ASD
Theatre at Carnuntum	Castrum Legionarium	Petronell-Carnuntum	Austria	48°7′0″N 16°52′0″E	40 metres (130 ft)	in Theatrum database	
Theatre at Virunum	Claudium Virunum	Zollfeld	Austria	46°41′49.5″N 14°22′09.6″E	70 metres (230 ft)	Entry in Theatrum database	Maria Saal Zollfeld Virunum Arena Nordteil 22092006 01
Theatre at Artaxata	Artaxata	Artaschat	Armenia	39°52′55″N 44°33′56″E		Entry in Theatrum database	
Theatre at Blicquy		Blicquy	Belgium	50°35′N 3°41′E	70 metres (230 ft)	Entry in Theatrum database	Theatre at Blicquy
Theatre at Fontaine-Valmont		Fontaine-Valmont	Belgium	50.3180°N 4.2155°E		Entry in Theatrum database	
Theatre at Kasnakovo		Kasnakovo	Bulgaria	42°01′N 25°30′E		The interpretation of the remains as a theatre is not certain; Entry in Theatrum database	
Theatre at Nicopolis ad Istrum	Nicopolis ad Istrum	Nikyup	Bulgaria	43°13′02″N 25°36′40″E		Entry in Theatrum database	Theatre at Nicopolis ad Istrum
Roman theatre of Philippopolis	Philippopolis (Thrace)	Plovdiv	Bulgaria	42.14678°N 24.75094°E	82 metres (269 ft)	Entry in Theatrum database	
Theatre at Serdica	Serdica	Sofia	Bulgaria	42.697222°N 23.328333°E		Lies under the later Amphitheatre of Serdica	
Theatre at Augusta Trajana	Augusta Trajana	Stara Zagora	Bulgaria	42.427169°N 25.624759°E		Unusual arrangement of seating at one end of the forum	Stara Zagora - forum seating
Theatre at Vis	Issa	Vis	Croatia		54.8 metres (180 ft)	Position approximate; Entry in Theatrum database	
Small Theatre of Pula	Colonia Pietas Iulia Pola Pollentia Herculanea	Pula	Croatia	44.870146°N 13.846992°E	82 metres (269 ft)	Entry in Theatrum database	Roman Theatre, Colonia Pietas Iulia Pola Pollentia Herculanea
Theatre at Salona	Salona	Solin	Croatia	43.535902°N 16.480771°E	65 metres (213 ft)	Entry in Theatrum database	The Roman Theatre at Salona
Theatre at Zadar	Iadera	Zadar	Croatia	44°7′13″N 15°13′50″E		Destroyed before 1657; Entry in Theatrum database	
Theatre at Kourion	Curium	Kourion	Cyprus	34.6643°N 32.8879°E	52 metres (171 ft)	Entry in Theatrum database	Theater at Kourion
Theatre at Salamis	Salamis	Salamis	Cyprus	35.1848°N 33.9025°E	104 metres (341 ft)	Entry in Theatrum database	Theater at Salamis
Great Theatre of Alexandria	Alexandria	Alexandria	Egypt	31.194666°N 29.904057°E		Attested only in literary sources; Entry in Theatrum database	
Small Theatre of Alexandria	Alexandria	Alexandria	Egypt	31.194666°N 29.904057°E	33 metres (108 ft)	Entry in Theatrum database	Roman theatre in Alexandria
Theatre of Antinooupolis	Antinooupolis	El Sheikh Ibada	Egypt	27°49′N 30°53′E	90 metres (300 ft)	Entry in Theatrum database	
Theatre at Kom el-Dahab		Kom el-Dahab	Egypt	31.315231°N 31.833076°E			
Theatre at Memphis	Memphis	Memphis	Egypt	29°50′41″N 31°15′3″E		Attested only in papyri; Entry in Theatrum database	
Olympian Theatre	Crocodilopolis / Arsinoe	Medinet el Fayum	Egypt	29.308374°N 30.844105°E		Attested only in papyri; Entry in Theatrum database	
Theatre at Oxyrhynchus	Oxyrhynchus	el-Bahnasa	Egypt	28.536725°N 30.652294°E	122 metres (400 ft)	Entry in Theatrum database	
Theatre at Panopolis	Panopolis	Akhmim	Egypt	26°34′N 31°45′E		Attested only in papyri; Entry in Theatrum database	
Theatre at Pelusium	Pelusium		Egypt	31.042518°N 32.546128°E			
Theatre at Ptolemais	Ptolemais Hermiou	Al-Mansah	Egypt	26°29′N 31°48′E		Attested only in an inscription; Entry in Theatrum database	
Théâtre antique d'Aix-en-Provence	Aquae Sextiae	Aix-en-Provence	France	43.530280°N 5.437220°E	100 metres (330 ft)		
Théâtre antique d'Arles	Arelate	Arles	France	43.676484°N 4.629784°E	102 metres (335 ft)	Listed as a UNESCO World Heritage Site, together with other Roman buildings of the city; Entry in Theatrum database	Ruins at the Roman theatre of Arles
Roman theatre at Arnières-sur-Iton	Asinaria	Arnières-sur-Iton	France	48.999616°N 1.110515°E		Entry in Theatrum database	
Roman theatre at Aubigné-Racan	Cherré	Aubigné-Racan	France	47.663448°N 0.236165°E		Entry in Theatrum database	Aubigné-Racan - Site archéologique de Cherré - Le théatre (3)
Théâtre romain d'Autun	Augustodunum	Autun	France	46.952788°N 4.309973°E	148 metres (486 ft)	Entry in Theatrum database	Theatre at Augustodunum
Roman theatre at Barzan	Novioregum	Barzan	France	45.534937°N 0.868973°W			Théâtre gallo-romain de Barzan 2015
Roman theater of Montaudou	Arverni	Ceyrat	France	45°45′38″N 3°4′19″E		Entry in Theatrum database	Theatre at Montaudou
Roman theatre at Champlieu		Champlieu, Orrouy	France	49.3091°N 2.854285°E	71.4 metres (234 ft)	Entry in Theatrum database	Theatre at Champlieu
Roman theatre at Clion	Claudiomagus	Clion-sur-Indre	France	46.946238°N 1.229881°E	85 metres (279 ft)	Entry in Theatrum database	
Roman theatre at Briga/Augusta Ambianorum	Briga/Augusta Ambianorum	Eu	France	50.021619°N 1.465376°E		Entry in Theatrum database	Theatre at Briga/Augusta Ambianorum
Théâtre romain de Fréjus		Fréjus	France	43.436929°N 6.73816°E			Theatre at Briga/Augusta Ambianorum
Roman theatre of Lillebonne	Juliobona	Lillebonne	France	49.517679°N 0.536769°E	109 metres (358 ft)	Entry in Theatrum database	name=Theatre at Juliobona
Ancient Theatre of Fourvière	Lugdunum	Lyon	France	45.759722°N 4.819722°E		Entry in Theatrum database	Theatre at Lugdunum
Théâtre Antique d'Orange	Aurasio	Orange	France	44.13587°N 4.80886°E	103.63 metres (340.0 ft)	The Théâtre Antique d'Orange is listed as a UNESCO World Heritage Site, together with other Roman buildings of the city; Entry in Theatrum database	Theater Orange
Theater at Neung-sur-Beuvron	Noviodunum Biturgium	Neung-sur-Beuvron	France	47.513366°N 1.81299°E	100 metres (330 ft)	No longer visible; entry in Theatrum database	
Theatre at Ribemont-sur-Ancre		Ribemont-sur-Ancre	France	49.964057°N 2.554822°E	68 metres (223 ft)	Entry in Theatrum database	
Theatre at St-Bertrand-de-Comminges	Lugdunum Convenarum	Saint-Bertrand-de-Comminges	France	43.0282057°N 0.5719848°E	70 metres (230 ft)	Entry in Theatrum database	Lugdunum Convenarum-theatre
Gallo-Roman theatre at Les Bouchauds		Saint-Cybardeaux	France	45.7817°N 0.0062°W			Gallo-Roman theatre at Les Bouchauds
Theatre at St-Goussaud		Saint-Goussaud	France	46.033456°N 1.568883°E	30 metres (98 ft)	Entry in Theatrum database	Theatre at Saint-Goussaud
Theatre at Sanxay	Sanxay	Sanxay	France	46.494775°N 0.021939°W	90 metres (300 ft)	Entry in Theatrum database	Theatre at Sanxay
Theatre at Soissons	Augusta Suessionum	Soissons	France	49.378390°N 3.322871°E	144 metres (472 ft)	Entry in Theatrum database	
Theatre at Vendeuil-Caply		Vendeuil-Caply	France	49.6081°N 2.3007°E		Entry in Theatrum database	Théâtre antique de Vendeuil-Caply
Théâtre antique de Vienne	Vienna	Vienne, Isère	France	45.524877°N 4.878686°E	130.4 metres (428 ft)	Entry in Theatrum database	Theatre at Vienne
Theatre at Vieux	Aragenua	Vieux, Calvados	France	49.107203°N 0.4303407°E		Entry in Theatrum database	Théâtre gallo-romain Vieux
Roman Theatre (Mainz)	Mogontiacum	Mainz	Germany	49.993117°N 8.278065°E	116.25 metres (381.4 ft)	Entry in Theatrum database	Theatre at Mainz
Odeon of Herodes Atticus	Athens	Athens	Greece	37.970756°N 23.724444°E		Entry in Theatrum database	Theatre at Athens
Theatre of Dionysus	Athens	Athens	Greece	37.97034°N 23.727784°E		Pre-Roman origins; Entry in Theatrum database	Theatre of Dionysus at Athens
Theatre at Delphi	Delphi	Delphi	Greece	38.482464°N 22.500593°E	52.5 metres (172 ft)	Pre-Roman; Entry in Theatrum database	Theatre at Delphi
Odeon of Kos	Kos	Kos	Greece	36.8894576°N 27.2848399°E		Entry in Theatrum database	Kos Odeon
Theatre at Binyamina		Binyamina / Shuni	Israel	32.534731°N 34.948264°E	59.5 metres (195 ft)	Entry in Theatrum database	Roman theatre in Binyamina
Theatre at Caesarea Maritima	Caesarea Maritima		Israel	32.495937°N 34.891199°E	100 metres (330 ft)	Entry in Theatrum database	Theatre at Caesarea maritima
Theatre at Hippos	Hippos		Israel	32.779312°N 35.65896°E		Entry in Theatrum database	Theatre at Hippos (aerial)
Theatre at Beit She'an	Scythopolis	Beit She'an	Israel	32.501394°N 35.501577°E	109 metres (358 ft)	Entry in Theatrum database	Theatre at BeitShe'an
Theatre at Sepphoris	Sepphoris	Tzippori	Israel	32.753380°N 35.279791°E	74 metres (243 ft)	Entry in Theatrum database	Theatre at Sepphoris
Theatre at Tiberias	Tiberias	Tveria	Israel	32.776049°N 35.541216°E		Location is approximate; Entry in Theatrum database	Theatre at Tiberias
Theatre at Emmatha	Emmatha	Hamat Gader	Israel	32.685283°N 35.665552°E	26 metres (85 ft)	Entry in Theatrum database	,
Theatre at Aeclanum	Aeclanum	Mirabella Eclano	Italy	41.05488381377752°N 15.011383283519773°E		Entry in Theatrum database	
Theatre at Allifae	Allifae	Alife	Italy	41.32895002846146°N 14.329686303232148°E		Entry in Theatrum database	
Theatre at Altinum	Altinum	Venice	Italy	45.550834°N 12.392179°E		Article in Science	
Roman Theatre, Aosta	Augusta Prætoria Salassorum	Aosta	Italy	45.738578°N 7.322380°E	62.7 metres (206 ft)	Entry in Theatrum database	Theatre at Augusta Prætoria Salassorum
Theatre at Aquileia	Aquileia	Aquileia	Italy	45.771223°N 13.364646°E	95 metres (312 ft)	Article in FASTI-Online	
Theatre at Ascoli Piceno	Asculum	Ascoli Piceno	Italy	42.853751°N 13.568678°E	98 metres (322 ft) or 99.5 metres (326 ft)	Entry in Theatrum database	Theatre at Ascoli Piceno
Roman Theatre, Benevento	Beneventum	Benevento	Italy	41.130686°N 14.7719°E	93 metres (305 ft)	Entry in Theatrum database	Theatre at Beneventum
Theatre at Brixia	Brixia	Brescia	Italy	45.539914°N 10.226658°E	90 metres (300 ft)	Listed as a UNESCO World Heritage Site, together with other buildings of the city; Entry in Theatrum database	Theatre at Brixia
Theatre at Casinum	Casinum	Cassino	Italy	41.483206°N 13.82109°E	53.5 metres (176 ft)	Entry in Theatrum database	Theatre at Casinum
Theatre at Carsulae	Carsulae	San Gemini	Italy	42.639338°N 12.560103°E	62 metres (203 ft)	Entry in Theatrum database	Theatre at Carsulae
Roman Theatre of Catania	Catana or Catani	Catania	Italy	37.502893615469596°N 15.083633210393993°E	98 metres (322 ft)		Theater at Catania
Theatre at Corfinium	Corfinium	Corfinio	Italy	42.124150°N 13.842996°E	75 metres (246 ft)	Entry in Theatrum database	
Theatre at Civitas Cammunorum	Civitas Camunnorum	Cividate Camuno	Italy	45.944162°N 10.280654°E	56 metres (184 ft)	Entry in Theatrum database	Theatre at Civitas Cammunorum
Theatre at Faesulae	Faesulae	Fiesole	Italy	43.807805°N 11.293734°E	67 metres (220 ft)	Entry in Theatrum database	The Roman theatre at Fiesole
Theatre at Falerii Novi	Falerii Novi	Civita Castellana	Italy	42.298524°N 12.3600°E		Geomagnetic survey results	
Theatre at Falerone	Falerio	Falerone	Italy	43.102364°N 13.500024°E	49.2 metres (161 ft)	Entry in Theatrum database	The Roman theatre at Falerone
Ferento Roman Theatre	Ferentium		Italy	42.488469°N 12.132135°E	61.93 metres (203.2 ft)	Website; Entry in Theatrum database	Ferentium 1071
Roman Theatre of Florence	Florentia	Florence	Italy	43.769315°N 11.256174°E	100 metres (330 ft)?	Under the Palazzo Vecchio; Entry in Theatrum database	
Theatre at Gabii	Gabii	Gabii	Italy	41.886637°N 12.716210°E	60 metres (200 ft)?	Entry in Theatrum database	
Theatre at Heloros	Heloros	Eloro	Italy	36.841178°N 15.1055724°E		Entry in Theatrum database	Teatro di Eloro
Roman Theatre at Iguvium	Iguvium	Gubbio	Italy	43.351962°N 12.572652°E		Entry in Theatrum database	Theatre at Iguvium
Theatre at Interamna Nahars	Interamna Nahars	Terni	Italy	42.560953°N 12.644595°E		Location is approximate; Entry in Theatrum database	
Theatre at Interamna Lirenas	Interamna Lirenas	Pignataro Interamna	Italy	41.427687°N 13.753942°E		Excavation page	
Theatre at Liternum	Liternum	Giugliano in Campania	Italy	40.921349°N 14.030125°E			
Theatre at Luna	Luni, Italy	Luni, Italy	Italy	44.064917°N 10.020239°E			
Theatre at Mediolanum	Mediolanum	Milan	Italy	45.465156°N 9.182996°E	95 metres (312 ft)	Under the Palazzo Mezzanotte; Entry in Theatrum database	Theatre at Mediolanum
Theatre at Mevania	Mevania	Bevagna	Italy	42.934715°N 12.610330°E	90 metres (300 ft)	Entry in Theatrum database	Theatre at Bevagna
Theatre at Minturnae	Minturnae	Minturno	Italy	41.242464°N 13.768467°E	78.3 metres (257 ft)	Entry in Theatrum database	The Roman theatre at Minturnae
Theatre at Nora	Nora	Nora	Italy	38.984523°N 9.016578°E	39 metres (128 ft)	Entry in Theatrum database	Nora-Theater
Theatre at Ostia	Ostia	Ostia Antica	Italy	41.755926°N 12.291368°E	88 metres (289 ft)	At the Ancient Theatre Archive; Entry in Theatrum database	Theatre at Ostia
Theatre at Praeneste	Palestrina	Praeneste	Italy	41.840428°N 12.892538°E	59 metres (194 ft)	Entry in Theatrum database	
Theatre at Peltuinum	Peltuinum	Prata d'Ansidonia	Italy	42.28288°N 13.624048°E			Theatre at Peltuinum
Theatre at Pietravairano	Callicula	Pietravairano	Italy	41.3360398°N 14.1694831°E	43 metres (141 ft)	Entry in The Ancient Theatre Archive database	
Grand Theatre at Pompeii	Pompeii	Pompei	Italy	40.748781°N 14.488423°E	60 metres (200 ft)	Entry in Theatrum database	Pompeii, Italy. Bird's eye view of the large and small theatres, Pompeii. Brooklyn Museum Archives, Goodyear Archival Collection
Odeon at Pompeii	Pompeii	Pompei	Italy	40.748815°N 14.489035°E		Entry in Theatrum database	Odeon theatre at Pompeii
Theatre at Ricina	Ricina	Villapotenza, Macerata	Italy	43.327956°N 13.424089°E	71.8 metres (236 ft)	Entry in Theatrum database	Theatre at Ricina
Theatre of Marcellus	Roma	Rome	Italy	41.891667°N 12.479167°E	129.8 metres (426 ft)	Entry in Theatrum database	Theatre of Marcellus
Theatre of Pompey	Roma	Rome	Italy	41.895291°N 12.473995°E	150 metres (490 ft)	Entry in Theatrum database	Theatre of Pompey in the Forma Urbis Romae
Theatre at Saepinum	Saepinum	Altilia	Italy	41.433333°N 14.616667°E	61.5 metres (202 ft)	Entry in Theatrum database	Theater at Saepinum
Theatre at Suasa	Suasa	Castelleone di Suasa	Italy	43.625165°N 12.984624°E		The discovery of the theatre	
Theatre at Spoletium	Spoletium	Spoleto	Italy	42.733303°N 12.735088°E	72.2 metres (237 ft)	Entry in Theatrum database	Theatre at Spoletium
Greek Theatre of Syracuse	Syracusae	Syracuse	Italy	37.075833°N 15.275000°E		Pre-Roman origins; Entry in Theatrum database	Theatre at Syracusae
Ancient theatre of Taormina	Tauromenium	Taormina	Italy	37.852222°N 15.292222°E	109 metres (358 ft)	Pre-Roman origins; Entry in Theatrum database	Theatre at Tauromenium
Theatre at Interamna Praetutiana	Interamna Praetutiana	Teramo	Italy	42.658086°N 13.704284°E		Entry in Theatrum database	Theatre at Interamna Praetutiana
Theatre at Teanum Sidicinum	Teanum Sidicinum	Teano	Italy	41.24817°N 14.07273°E	85 metres (279 ft)	Entry in Theatrum database	Teatro romano of Teano.
Theatre at Suessa	Suessa	Sessa Aurunca	Italy	41.2345°N 13.9305°E	85 metres (279 ft)	Entry in Theatrum database	Teatro Romano di Sessa Aurunca.
Theatre at Tergeste	Tergeste	Trieste	Italy	45.649195°N 13.771698°E	64 metres (210 ft)	Entry in Theatrum database	Theatre at Tergeste
Theatre at Terracina	Tarracina	Terracina	Italy	41.292110°N 13.249246°E	60 metres (200 ft)	Entry in Theatrum database	Theatre at Terracina
Theatre at Tindari	Tyndaris	Tindari	Italy	38.143737738°N 15.042417673°E		Entry in Theatrum database	Tindari theatre
Theatre at Tibur	Tibur	Tivoli	Italy	41.963277°N 12.791800°E	65 metres (213 ft)	Entry in Theatrum database	Theater in Sanctuary of Hercules, Tivoli
Theatre at Todi	Tuder	Todi	Italy	42.782883°N 12.407380°E	83 metres (272 ft)	Entry in Theatrum database	
Theatre at Augusta Taurinorum	Augusta Taurinorum	Turin	Italy	45.073998°N 7.685764°E	70 metres (230 ft)	Entry in Theatrum database	Theatre at Augusta Taurinorum
Theatre at Tusculum	Tusculum	Monte Porzio Catone	Italy	41.79833°N 12.71047°E	46 metres (151 ft)	Entry in Theatrum database	Theatre at Tusculum
Theatre at Urbs Salvia	Urbs Salvia	Urbisaglia	Italy	43.198878°N 13.380658°E	85 metres (279 ft)	Entry in Theatrum database	Roman theatre at Urbs Salvia
Theatre at Venafro	Venafrum	Venafro	Italy	41.48560°N 14.04002°E		Roman Theatre of Venafrum; Entry in Theatrum database	
Roman Theatre at Verona	Verona	Verona	Italy	45.447417°N 11.001639°E	108–110 metres (354–361 ft)	Entry in Theatrum database	Theatre at Verona
Teatro Berga	Vicetia	Vicenza	Italy	45.543889°N 11.547944°E	82 metres (269 ft)	Mostly destroyed in the 17th century	Plan of the Teatro Berga
Theatre at Volterra	Volaterrae	Volterra	Italy	43.403611°N 10.86°E	60–63 metres (197–207 ft)	Entry in Theatrum database	Theatre at Volterra
Roman Theater	Philadelphia	Amman	Jordan	31.951692°N 35.939306°E	102 metres (335 ft)	Entry in Theatrum database	Roman theatre at Philadelphia, Jordan
Odeon theater	Philadelphia	Amman	Jordan	31.951692°N 35.939306°E	40 metres (130 ft)	Entry in Theatrum database	Odeon theater at Philadelphia, Jordan
Theatre at Abila	Abila	Quwaylibah	Jordan	32.680556°N 35.869167°E	73–80 metres (240–262 ft)	Entry in Theatrum database	
West Theatre at Gadara	Gadara	Umm Qais	Jordan	32.655610°N 35.677995°E	53 metres (174 ft)	Entry in Theatrum database	West Roman theatre at Gadara
North Theatre at Gadara	Gadara	Umm Qais	Jordan	32.656237°N 35.680130°E	77 metres (253 ft)	Entry in Theatrum database	
South Theatre at Gerasa	Gerasa	Jerash	Jordan	32.276789°N 35.889155°E		Entry in Theatrum database	South Theatre at Gerasa
North Theatre at Gerasa	Gerasa	Jerash	Jordan	32.282604°N 35.892341°E	42.3 metres (139 ft)	Entry in Theatrum database	North Theatre at Gerasa
Theatre at Pella	Pella	Pella	Jordan	32.45°N 35.616667°E	38.5 metres (126 ft)	Entry in Theatrum database	
Theatre at Petra (Nabatean Theater)	Petra		Jordan	30.324796°N 35.447029°E	100 metres (330 ft)	Entry in Theatrum database	Roman theatre at Petra
Theatre at Leptis Magna	Leptis Magna	Khoms	Libya	32.638399°N 14.290620°E	87.6 metres (287 ft)	Entry in Theatrum database	Theatre at Leptis Magna
Roman Theatre at Ptolemais	Ptolemais	Tolmeita	Libya	32.706919°N 20.952901°E	72 metres (236 ft)	Entry in Theatrum database	
Ancient theater of Sabratha	Sabratha	Sabratha	Libya	32.805371°N 12.485165°E	92.6 metres (304 ft)	Entry in Theatrum database	Theatre at Sabratha
Theatre at Gallia Belgica	Echternach	Echternach	Luxembourg			Entry in Theatrum database	
Theatre at Ricciacum	Ricciacum	Dalheim	Luxembourg	49.540677°N 6.257048°E	62.5 metres (205 ft)	Entry in Theatrum database	Theatre at Ricciacum
Theatre at Melite	Melite	Mdina	Malta	35.885370°N 14.403297°E		No longer exists	
Theater at Lixus	Lixus	Larache	Morocco	35.19997°N 6.10868°W	55 metres (180 ft)	Entry in Theatrum database. Converted to amphitheater.	
Theatre at Heraclea Lyncestis	Heraclea Lyncestis	Bitola	North Macedonia	41.011436°N 21.342205°E		Entry in Theatrum database	Theatre at Heraclea Lyncestis
Theatre at Scupi	Scupi	Skopje	North Macedonia	42.017180°N 21.393562°E		Entry in Theatrum database	Theatre at Scupi
Theatre at Stobi	Stobi	Gradsko	North Macedonia	41.551502°N 21.974598°E	c.65 metres (213 ft)	Entry in Theatrum database	Theatre at Stobi
Theatre at Lychnidos	Lychnidos	Ohrid	North Macedonia	41.114624°N 20.793831°E		Entry in Theatrum database	Theatre in Lychnidos, Ohrid
Theatre at Sebaste	Sebaste	Sebastia	Palestinian territories	32.277192°N 35.190716°E	65 metres (213 ft)	Entry in Theatrum database	
Theatre at Flavia Neapolis	Flavia Neapolis	Nablus	Palestinian territories	32.216389°N 35.262778°E	100+ metres (330+ ft)	Nablus Guide; Entry in Theatrum database	
Roman theatre of Lisbon	Olisipo	Lisbon	Portugal	38.710551°N 9.132468°W		Website; Entry in Theatrum database	name:Olisipo Roman theatre ruins
Roman Theatre of Alto da Cividade	Bracara Augusta	Braga	Portugal	41.546697°N 8.430317°W		Website	
Theatre at Acci	Julia Gemela Acci	Guadix	Spain	37.302288°N 3.137887°W	20 metres (65 ft)	Entry in Theatrum database	
Theatre at Acinipo	Acinipo		Spain	36.831855°N 5.240466°W	62 metres (203 ft)	Entry in Theatrum database	Theater of the Roman ruins Acinipo
Theatre at Baelo Claudia	Baelo Claudia	Bolonia	Spain	36.090894°N 5.775581°W	70 metres (230 ft)	Entry in Theatrum database	Theatre at Baelo Claudia
Theatre at Baetulo	Baetulo	Badalona	Spain	41.451972°N 2.245993°E		Entry in Theatrum database	
Theatre at Bilbilis	Bilbilis		Spain	41.381702°N 1.603078°W	80 metres (260 ft)	Entry in Theatrum database	Theatre at Bilbilis
Theatre at Caesaraugusta	Caesaraugusta	Zaragoza	Spain	41.652233°N 0.877608°W	106 metres (348 ft)	Entry in Theatrum database	Theatre at Caesaraugusta
Roman Theatre (Cartagena)	Carthago Nova	Cartagena	Spain	37.599483°N 0.984133°W	85 metres (279 ft)	Entry in Theatrum database	Theatre at Carthago Nova
Theatre of Carteia	Carteia	San Roque	Spain	36.185556°N 5.406944°W	84 metres (276 ft)	Entry in Theatrum database	Theatre at Carteia
Theatre of Clunia Sulpicia	Clunia Sulpicia	Clunia	Spain	41.783996°N 3.365308°W	48 metres (157 ft)	Entry in Theatrum database	Theatre at Clunia
Theatre at Corduba	Corduba	Córdoba	Spain	37.881724°N 4.777987°W		Entry in Theatrum database	Theatre at Corduba
Theatre of Emerita Augusta	Emerita Augusta	Mérida	Spain	38.915346°N 6.338643°W	86.63 metres (284.2 ft)	Entry in Theatrum database	Theatre of Emerita Augusta as viewed from the upper seats
Theatre at Gades	Gades	Cádiz	Spain	36.528496°N 6.293658°W	85 metres (279 ft)	Entry in Theatrum database	Theatre at Gades
Theatre at Italica	Italica	Santiponce	Spain	37.440081°N 6.038731°W	71 metres (233 ft)	Entry in Theatrum database	Theatre at Italica
Theatre at Malaca	Malaca	Málaga	Spain	36.721194°N 4.416879°W	62 metres (203 ft)	Entry in Theatrum database	Theatre at Malaca
Theatre at Metellinum	Metellinum	Medellín	Spain	38.966193°N 5.956047°W	63 metres (207 ft)	Entry in Theatrum database	Theatre at Metellinum
Theatre at Pollentia	Pollentia	Alcúdia	Spain	39.847339°N 3.126348°E	31 metres (102 ft)	Entry in Theatrum database	Theatre at Pollentia
Theatre at Regina Turdoulorum	Regina Turdulorum	Reina	Spain	38.203332°N 5.953483°W	53 metres (174 ft)	Website; Entry in Theatrum database	Theatre at Regina Turdoulorum
Sagunto Roman theatre	Saguntum	Sagunto	Spain	39.676880°N 0.278109°W	77 metres (253 ft)	Entry in Theatrum database	Theatre at Saguntum
Theatre at Segobriga	Segobriga		Spain	39.884996°N 2.814217°W	60 metres (200 ft)	Entry in Theatrum database	Theatre at Segobriga
Roman Theatre (Tarraco)	Tarraco	Tarragona	Spain	41.112856°N 1.249514°E	70.8 metres (232 ft)	Entry in Theatrum database	Theatre at Tarraco
Theater at Urso	Urso	Osuna	Spain	37.239106°N 5.094869°W	32.5 metres (107 ft)	Entry in Theatrum database	
Theatre at Augusta Raurica	Augusta Raurica	Augst	Switzerland	47.533277°N 7.722011°E	99.5 metres (326 ft)	Website; Entry in Theatrum database	Roman theatre in Augusta Raurica
Theatre at Aventicum	Aventicum	Avenches	Switzerland	46.880000°N 7.049000°E	105 metres (344 ft)	Entry in Theatrum database	name:Theatre at Aventicum
Theatre at Lenzburg		Vicus Lindfeld, Lenzburg	Switzerland	47.394902°N 8.190897°E		Entry in Theatrum database	20110621 Heliflug 45
Roman Theatre at Apamea	Apamea		Syria	35.416846°N 36.394821°E	139 metres (456 ft)	Entry in Theatrum database	Theatre at Apamea
Roman Theatre at Bosra	Bostra	Bosra	Syria	32.517650°N 36.481426°E	102 metres (335 ft)	Entry in Theatrum database	Theatre at Bostra
Theatre at Dionysias	Dionysias	Al-Suwayda	Syria	32.705776°N 36.565055°E		Entry in Theatrum database	Theatre at Dionysias Soada
Theatre of Dura-Europus	Dura-Europos		Syria		14 metres (46 ft)	Entry in Theatrum database	
Roman Theatre at Palmyra	Palmyra		Syria	34.550768°N 38.268761°E	90 metres (300 ft)	Entry in Theatrum database	The Roman Theatre at Palmyra
Theatre at Philippopolis	Philippopolis	Shahba	Syria	32.853307°N 36.626726°E	40 metres (130 ft)	Entry in Theatrum database	Theatre at Philippopolis
Roman Theatre of Jableh	Gabala	Jableh	Syria	35.361872°N 35.924303°E	90 metres (300 ft)	Entry in Theatrum database	Theatre at Jableh
Theatre at Aggar	Aggar (city)	Sidi Amara	Tunisia	35.856076°N 9.517726°E		Entry in Theatrum database	
Theatre at Althiburos	Althiburos	Althiburos	Tunisia	35.872644°N 8.786348°E	57.5 metres (189 ft)	Entry in Theatrum database	The Roman theatre at Althiburos
Theatre at Ammaedara	Ammaedara	Haïdra	Tunisia	35.566575°N 8.457329°E		Entry in Theatrum database	
Theatre at Bararus	Bararus	Rougga	Tunisia	35.211632°N 10.800944°E		Entry in Theatrum database	
Theatre at Bulla Regia	Bulla Regia		Tunisia	36.558858°N 8.757211°E		Entry in Theatrum database	
Theatre at Carthage	Carthage	Carthage	Tunisia	36.857736°N 10.329498°E	105 metres (344 ft)	Entry in Theatrum database	The Roman theatre at Carthage
Theatre at Cillium	Cillium	Kasserine	Tunisia	35.168462°N 8.799271°E	53 metres (173,9 ft)	Entry in Theatrum database	
Theatre at Dougga	Thugga	Dougga	Tunisia	36.423729°N 9.220279°E	63.5 metres (208 ft)	Entry in Theatrum database	The Roman theatre at Dougga
Theatre at Limisa	Limisa	Aïn-Lemsa	Tunisia	36.03544936494736°N 9.694592126559948°E		Entry in Theatrum database	
Theatre at Simmithus	Simitthus	Chemtou	Tunisia	36.078175°N 7.901234°E		Entry in Theatrum database	
Theater at Thelepte	Thelepte		Tunisia	34.964453°N 8.581252°E		Entry in Theatrum database	
Theatre at Thignica	Thignica		Tunisia	36.522805°N 9.362412°E	52 metres (171 ft)	Entry in Theatrum database	
Theatre at Uthina	Uthina		Tunisia	36.608526°N 10.177502°E		Entry in Theatrum database	
Theatre at Vicus Augusti	Vicus Augusti	Sidi el Hani	Tunisia	35.665490°N 10.302049°E	58 metres (190 ft)	Entry in Theatrum database	
Theatre at Alabanda	Alabanda	Doğanyurt	Turkey	37.5917514°N 27.98519285°E	82.3 metres (270 ft)	Entry in Theatrum database	The Hellenistic theate, located on a natural south-facing hillside, Alabanda, Caria, Turkey (20900317516)
Theatre at Alinda	Alinda	Karpuzlu	Turkey	37.559123°N 27.825490°E	64.5 metres (212 ft)	Entry in Theatrum database	The ruins of the early 2nd century BC theatre, Alinda, Caria, Turkey (20707156199)
Theatre at Ancyra	Ancyra	Ankara	Turkey	39.941745°N 32.860364°E		Entry in Theatrum database	
Theatre at Aizanoi	Aizanoi	Çavdarhisar	Turkey	39.207230°N 29.611908°E		Entry in Theatrum database	Theater, Aizanoi
Theatre at Aphrodisias	Aphrodisias	Geyre, Aydın	Turkey	37.709151°N 28.723585°E		pre-Roman origins; Entry in Theatrum database	The Roman theatre at Aphrodisias
Theatre at Arycanda	Arycanda		Turkey	36.514389°N 30.059931°E		Entry in Theatrum database	Theatre at Arycanda
Theatre at Aspendos	Aspendos	Serik, Antalya	Turkey	36.938944°N 31.172296°E		One of the best preserved theatres from antiquity; Entry in Theatrum database	Theatre at Aspendos
Theatre at Caunus	Caunus	Dalyan, Muğla	Turkey	36.825337°N 28.623375°E	72.5 metres (238 ft)	Entry in Theatrum database	Theatre at Caunus
Theatre at Ayaş	Elaiussa Sebaste	Ayaş	Turkey	36.483624°N 34.173725°E	55 metres (180 ft)	Entry in Theatrum database	name: Theatre at Ayaş
Theatre at Ephesus	Ephesus	Selçuk, İzmir	Turkey	37.941055°N 27.342316°E	140 metres (460 ft)	pre-Roman origins; Entry in Theatrum database	Theatre at Ephesus
Theatre at Erythrae	Erythrae	Çeşme, İzmir	Turkey	38.382950°N 26.480834°E		pre-Roman origins; Entry in Theatrum database	Theatre at Erythrae
Theatre at Euromus	Euromus	Selimiye, Muğla	Turkey	37.376485°N 27.675151°E		pre-Roman origins; Location approximate; Entry in Theatrum database	
Theatre at Halicarnassus	Halicarnassus	Bodrum	Turkey	37.037778°N 27.424167°E		pre-Roman origins; Entry in Theatrum database	Theatre at Halicarnassus
Roman Theatre at Hierapolis	Hierapolis	Pamukkale	Turkey	37.925000°N 29.125833°E	103 metres (338 ft)	Entry in Theatrum database	Theatre at Hierapolis
Theatre at Isaura Vetus	Isaura Vetus		Turkey			No longer visible; Entry in Theatrum database	
Upper Theatre at Knidos	Knidos		Turkey			pre-Roman origins; spoliated in the 19th century; Entry in Theatrum database	
Lower Theatre at Knidos	Knidos		Turkey	36.685833°N 27.375000°E	58.5 metres (192 ft)	pre-Roman origins; Entry in Theatrum database	Theatre at Knidos
West Theatre at Laodicea on the Lycus	Laodicea on the Lycus		Turkey	37.838742°N 29.107710°E	85 metres (279 ft)	Entry in Theatrum database	Western Theater at Laodicea on the Lycus
North theater at Laodicea on the Lycus	Laodicea on the Lycus		Turkey	37.837984°N 29.111193°E	116 metres (381 ft)	Entry in Theatrum database	
Theater at Limyra	Limyra		Turkey	36.343153°N 30.170382°E	65.5 metres (215 ft)	Entry in Theatrum database	Theater at Limyra
Theater at Miletus	Miletus		Turkey	37.530647°N 27.275800°E	125 metres (410 ft)	Entry in Theatrum database	Theater at Miletus
Theatre at Myra	Myra		Turkey		110 metres (360 ft)	pre-Roman origins; Entry in Theatrum database	
Theatre at Nysa	Nysa		Turkey		100–115 metres (328–377 ft)	Entry in Theatrum database	
Theatre at Olba	Olba (Diocaesarea)	Uzuncaburç	Turkey	36.581223°N 33.926794°E		pre-Roman origins; [ Entry] in Theatrum database	name:Theatre at Olba
Theatre at Patara	Patara		Turkey	36.260222°N 29.314301°E	84 metres (276 ft)	Entry in Theatrum database	Theatre at Patara
Roman Theatre at Pergamon	Pergamon	Bergama	Turkey	39.132500°N 27.184167°E	120 metres (390 ft)	No longer visible; Entry in Theatrum database	
Theatre at Pergamon, Asculepium	Pergamon Asculepium	Bergama	Turkey	39.119167°N 27.165556°E	70 metres (230 ft)	Entry in Theatrum database	Theatre at Pergamon, Asculepium
Theatre at Perge	Perge		Turkey	36.957764°N 30.850907°E	113.2 metres (371 ft)	Entry in Theatrum database	Theatre at Perge
Theatre at Phaselis	Phaselis		Turkey	36.525905°N 30.551549°E	c.50 metres (160 ft)	Entry in Theatrum database	Theatre at Phaselis
Theatre at Phocaea	Phocaea		Turkey	38.6675°N 26.758056°E		Location is approximate; Entry in Theatrum database	Theatre at Phocaea
Theatre at Sagalassos	Sagalassos		Turkey	37.678229°N 30.521819°E	97 metres (318 ft)	pre-Roman origins? Entry in Theatrum database	Theatre at Sagalassos
Theatre at Selge	Selge		Turkey	37.229241°N 31.127221°E	102 metres (335 ft)	Entry in Theatrum database	Theatre at Selge
Theatre at Side	Side		Turkey	36.768067°N 31.390699°E	119 metres (390 ft)	Entry in Theatrum database	Theatre at Side
Theatre at Telmessos	Telmessos	Fethiye	Turkey	36.620944°N 29.105727°E		Entry in Theatrum database	Theatre at Telmessos
Theatre at Termessos	Termessos		Turkey	36.987738°N 30.467232°E	65 metres (213 ft)	pre-Roman origins; Entry in Theatrum database	Theatre at Termessos
Theatre at Vize	Bizye	Vize	Turkey	41.573802°N 27.769380°E		Entry in Theatrum Database	Theatre at Vize
Theatre at Camolodunum	Camulodunum	Colchester	United Kingdom	51.864844°N 0.857065°E	84.5 metres (277 ft)	Colchester Museums official website.	
Theatre at Cataractonium	Cataractonium	Catterick	United Kingdom	54.384167°N 1.649722°W		Entry in Theatrum Database	
Theatre at Corinium Dobunnorum	Corinium Dobunnorum	Cirencester	United Kingdom	51.718889°N 1.968056°W	58 metres (190 ft)	Entry in Theatrum Database	
Theatre at Durovernum Cantiacorum	Durovernum Cantiacorum	Canterbury	United Kingdom	51.278611°N 1.081944°E	82 metres (269 ft)	Entry in Theatrum Database	
Verulamium Roman Theatre	Verulamium	St Albans	United Kingdom	51.754119°N 0.358255°W	51–57 metres (167–187 ft)	Roman Theatre of Verulamium	Verulamium Roman Theatre

== See also ==
- Roman architecture
- Roman amphitheatre
- Theatre of ancient Rome
- List of extant ancient Greek and Roman plays
- List of Roman amphitheatres

== Bibliography ==
- Retzleff, Alexandra (2003). "Near Eastern Theatres in Late Antiquity". Phoenix. 57 (1/2): 115–138. doi:10.2307/3648491. JSTOR 3648491.
- Sear, Frank (2006). Roman theatres : an architectural study. Oxford: Oxford University Press. ISBN 0198144695.
