= Roman Theatre (Mérida) =

Ancient Roman theater in Mérida, Spain

Roman Theatre of Mérida
- Teatro Romano de Mérida (Spanish)
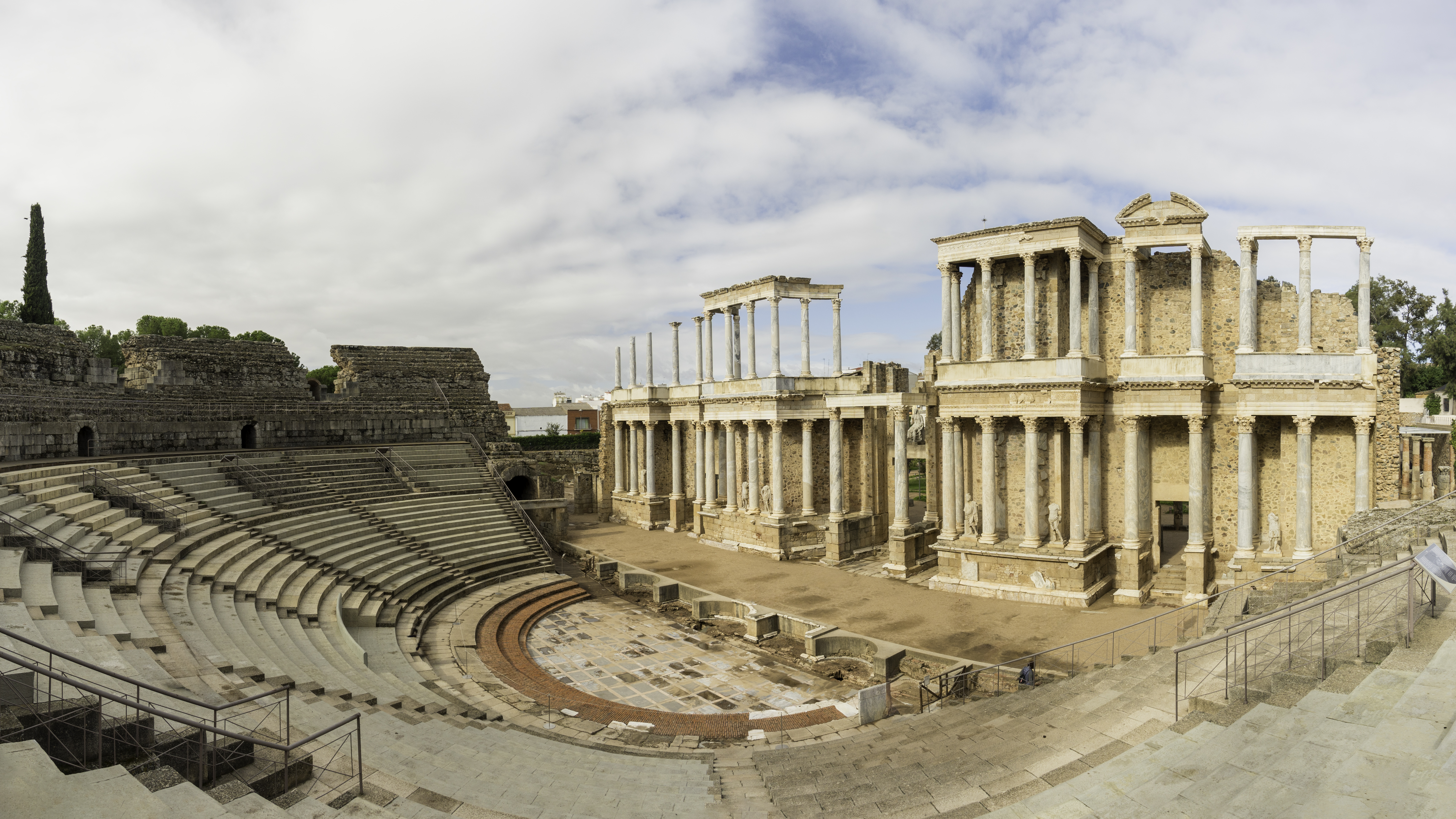
- Interactive map of Roman Theatre of Mérida
- 38°54′55.4″N 6°20′18.6″W
- Type: Roman theatre
- Location: Mérida (Badajoz), Spain

UNESCO World Heritage Site
- Official name: Roman Theatre
- Type: Cultural
- Criteria: iii, iv
- Designated: 1993 (17th session)
- Part of: "Roman Theatre, Amphitheatre, the Amphitheatre House" part of the Archaeological Ensemble of Mérida
- Reference no.: 664-005
- Region: Europe and North America

Spanish Cultural Heritage
- Official name: Teatro Romano
- Type: Non-movable
- Criteria: Monument
- Designated: 13 December 1912
- Reference no.: RI-51-0000107

The Roman Theatre of Mérida is a Roman theatre in the Roman colonia of Emerita Augusta –present-day Mérida, Spain–, capital of the Roman province of Lusitania. Its construction was promoted by the consul Vipsanius Agrippa and was built in 16–15 BCE. It was used for Roman theatrical performances during ancient Rome. Since 1933, it houses the International Festival of Classical Theatre of Mérida.

The theatre has undergone several renovations, notably at the end of the 1st century or early 2nd century CE (possibly during the reign of Emperor Trajan), when the current facade of the scaenae frons was erected, and another in the time of Constantine I (between 330 and 340 CE), which introduced new decorative-architectural elements and a walkway around the monument. Following the theatre's abandonment in Late Antiquity, it was slowly covered with earth, with only the upper tiers of seats (summa cavea) remaining visible. In local folklore the site was referred to as "The Seven Chairs", where, according to tradition, several Moorish kings sat to decide the fate of the city.

It was built as part of an entertainment complex together with the Amphitheatre of Mérida. Nowadays both are part of the Archaeological Ensemble of Mérida, which is one of the largest and most extensive archaeological sites in Spain and that was declared a World Heritage Site by UNESCO in 1993. The theatre is one of the most famous and visited landmarks in Spain, it is regarded as a Spanish cultural icon and was chosen as one of the 12 Treasures of Spain.

== Enclave ==
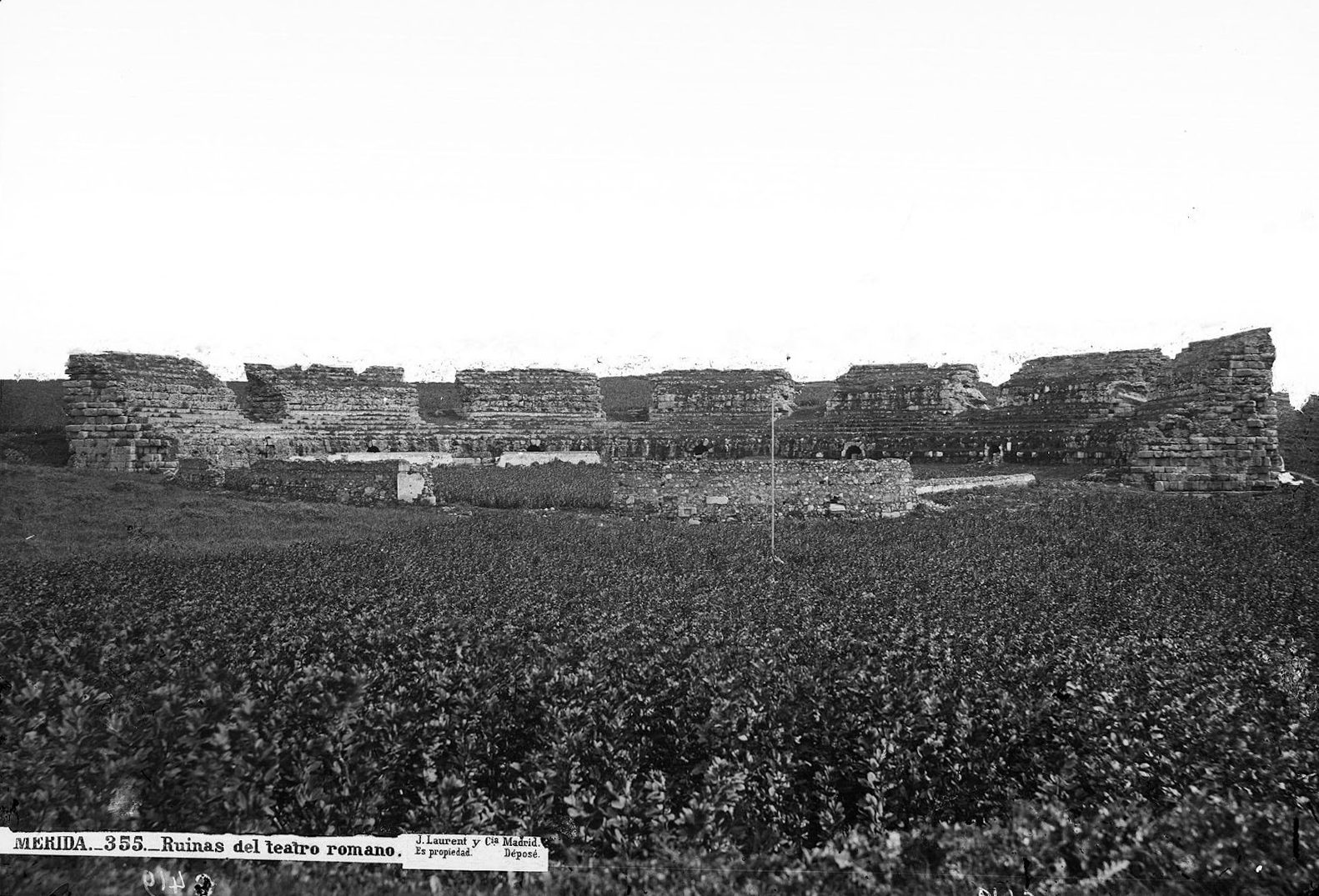
The Roman theatre in 1867, before the archaeological excavations. Photo by J. Laurent

The theatre is located in the archaeological ensemble of Mérida, one of the largest and most extensive archaeological sites in Spain. It was declared a World Heritage Site by UNESCO in 1993. The theatre was located on the edge of the Roman city adjacent the city walls. Some of the seating was built into a hill called the Cerro de San Albin.

=== Structure ===
Constructed in faithful accordance to the rules of the treatises of Vitruvius, the building corresponds to the typical Roman model. The structure exhibits similarities with the theatres of Dougga (Tunisia), Orange (France), Pompeii (Italy), and Rome.

=== Stands and orchestra ===
The semicircular shape of the grandstands cavea is incorporated into the gradient of San Albin hill. In its time it had a seating capacity of 6,000. The diameter is about 86 meters (282 feet). The stands are divided into three areas: the innermost ima cavea, (22 rows) media cavea (5 rows) and summa cavea, the latter being severely deteriorated today. The first rows ima cavea, where the wealthier social classes were seated, is divided into five radial sectors cunei, delimited stairs, a horizontal level, and a corridor praecinctio that separates it from the upper bleachers. Six doors at the top give access to a corridor covered by a semicircular dome ring that serve as entry and exit doors at the two extremities. The middle and upper caveas have five rows of seats each and are supported by a complex system of arches and barrel vaults. In total, thirteen outside doors facilitate access and entrance to the theatre.

The orchestra is a semicircular space paved with white and blue marble intended for the chorus. It is surrounded by three tiers of honour for authorities and separated from the stands by a marble parapet, of which fragments remain. In the front there is a low wall with alternating straight and curved sections and separated from the stage.

=== Stage ===
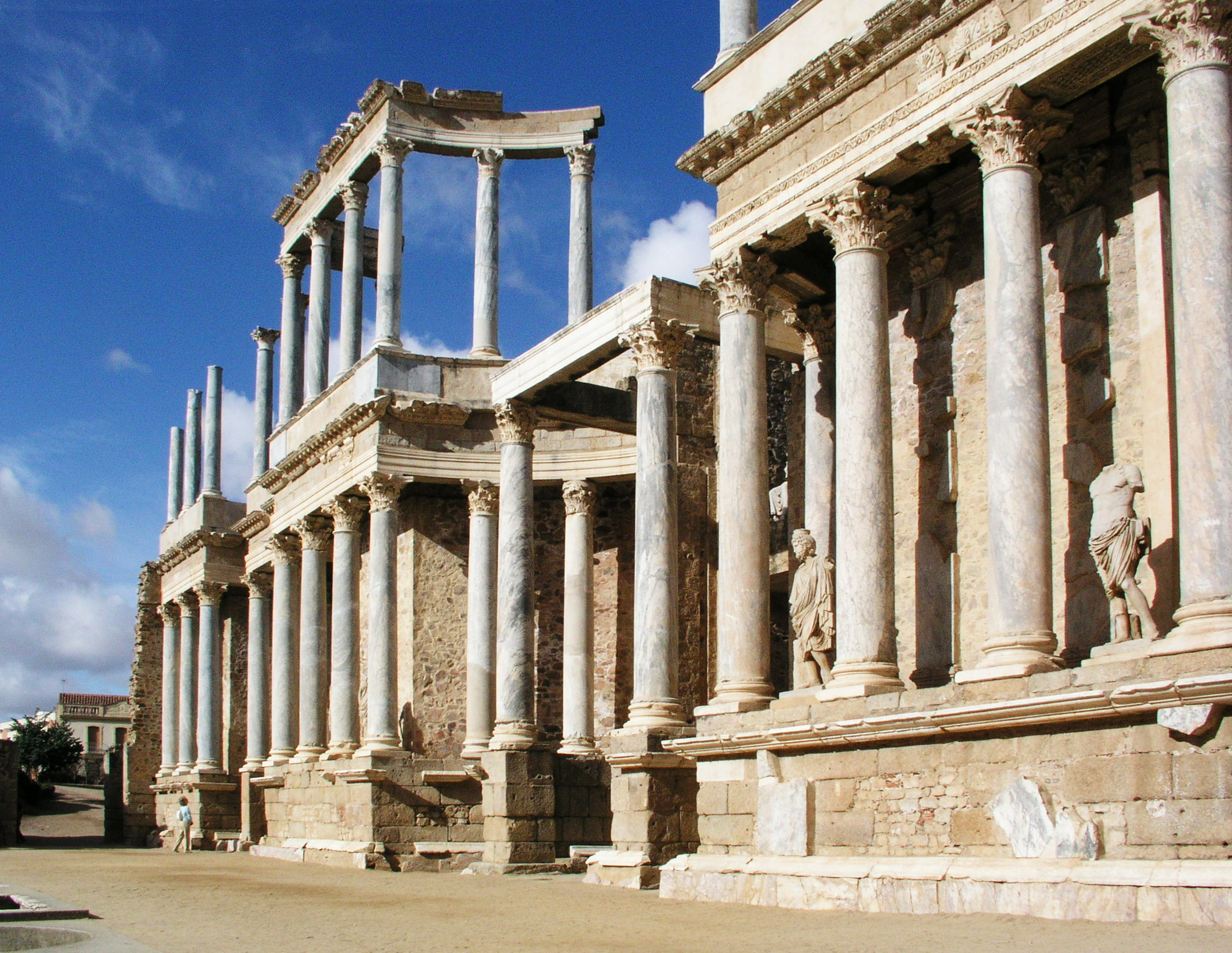
Stage

The leading edge of the stage proscenium was stone and the rectangular platform pulpitum was originally covered in wood. It has holes in the floor that in antiquity served to place scenic backdrop posts and other infrastructure. The downstage setting porticus post scaenam (frons frons) is the most spectacular feature of the theatre. It is 7.5m wide, 63m long and 17.5m in total height. It consists of a base of red marble paved stones, upon which stand Corinthian columns with blue-veined marble as the shafts with white bases and capitals. These columns support an entablature with architrave and richly decorated friezes and cornices. A large marble wall encloses the back of the stage scaenae frons. The décor of this part is completed by provisional sculptures between columns, the originals being kept in the nearby National Museum of Roman Art. They are the goddess Ceres, Pluto, Proserpina and other characters with togas and armour that have been interpreted as imperial portraits. Three doors allow the entry of actors onto the stage, one central valva regia and two lateral valva hospitalium. On the sides and back are several units that were used by the performing actors and technicians. It is unknown how the original stage front was, as the present one seems to have been built under Emperor Trajan.

=== Peristyle ===
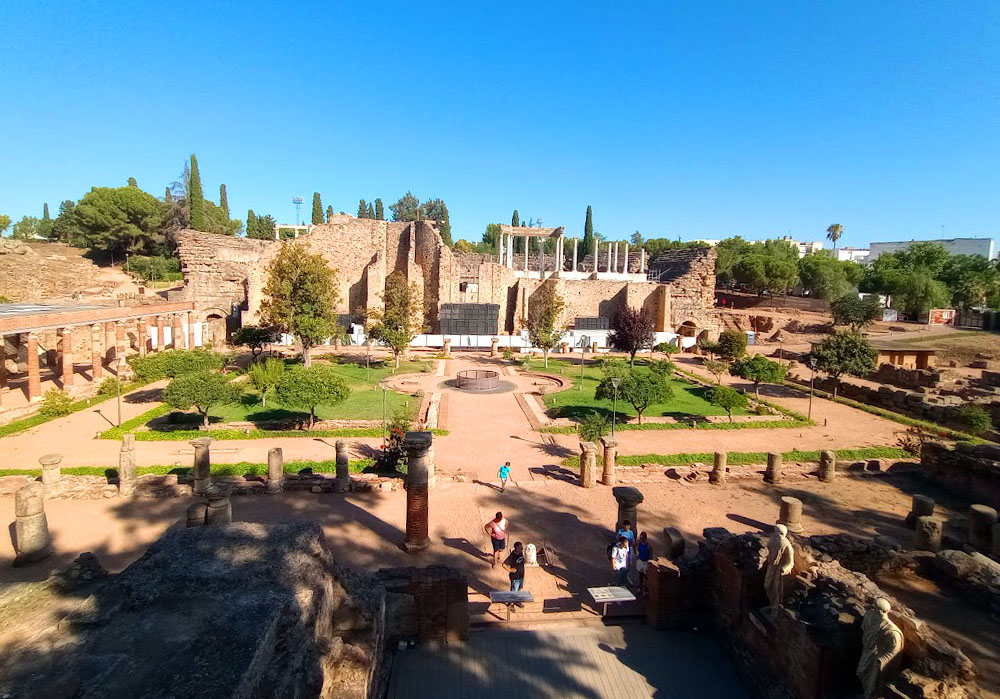
View of the peristyle and theater behind it.

Behind the stage is a garden area surrounded by columns and a quadrangular portico. The peristyle was used as a recreation area. At the bottom of this garden, on axis with the main door of the stage, there is a small room dedicated to the imperial cult, as reflected in the finding of a sculptural portrait of the emperor Caesar Augustus dressed as pontiff maximus. In the northern corner of the peristyle, high above the garden, there are latrines and to the west the remains of a house built after the abandonment of the theatre. This residence features a courtyard surrounded by columns and pilasters and several rooms, some topped with an apse and most with murals depicting life-size human figures.

== Excavation and restoration ==
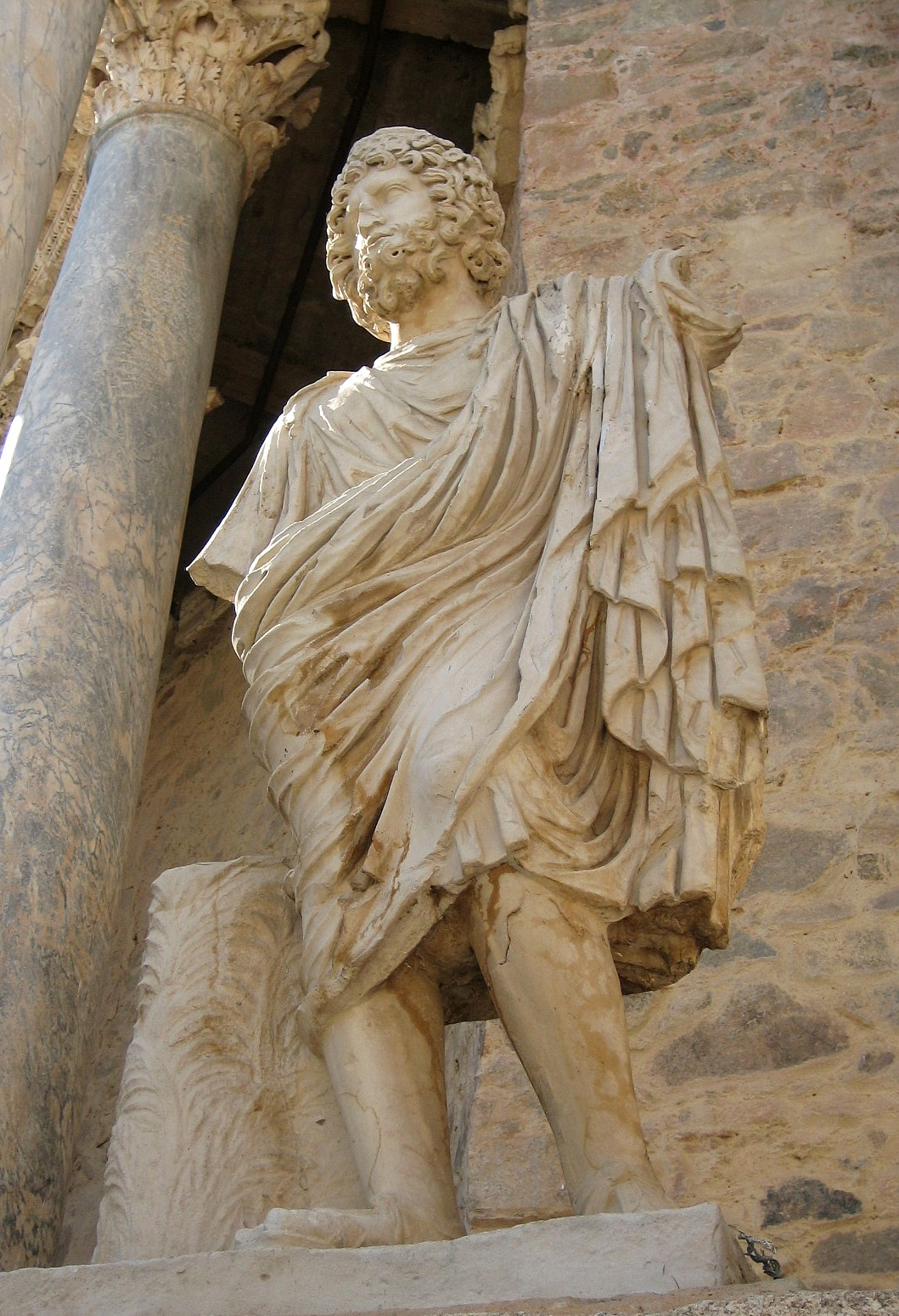
One of the statues on the theatre stage

Until the late 19th century, the only visible remains of the theater were the so-called "Seven Chairs", remains of the tops of the bleachers and a formed concrete base covered with granite blocks that made up the façade of the building. The excavations of the theater began in 1910, directed by archaeologist José Ramón Mélida. Having limited resources and methodology was not conducive to the reconstruction progress, which delayed excavation until the late twentieth century, when most of the building was excavated, documenting numerous columns, cornices, statues and other building materials, especially the front stage.

The excavated theater was first used to stage a production in 1933.

In the 1960s and 1970s the front stage was rebuilt under the direction of the architect and archaeologist José Menéndez Pidal y Álvarez.

== Current use ==
Besides being the most visited monument in the city, it has been home to the development of the International Festival of Classical Theatre of Mérida since 1933. This Classical Theatre Festival is the oldest of its kind celebrated in Spain.

== See also ==
- Archaeological Ensemble of Mérida
- List of Roman sites in Spain
- List of Roman theatres
