= Roman Theatre, Aosta =

Ancient Roman theater in Aosta, Italy

Coordinates: 45.73841°N 7.3223°E

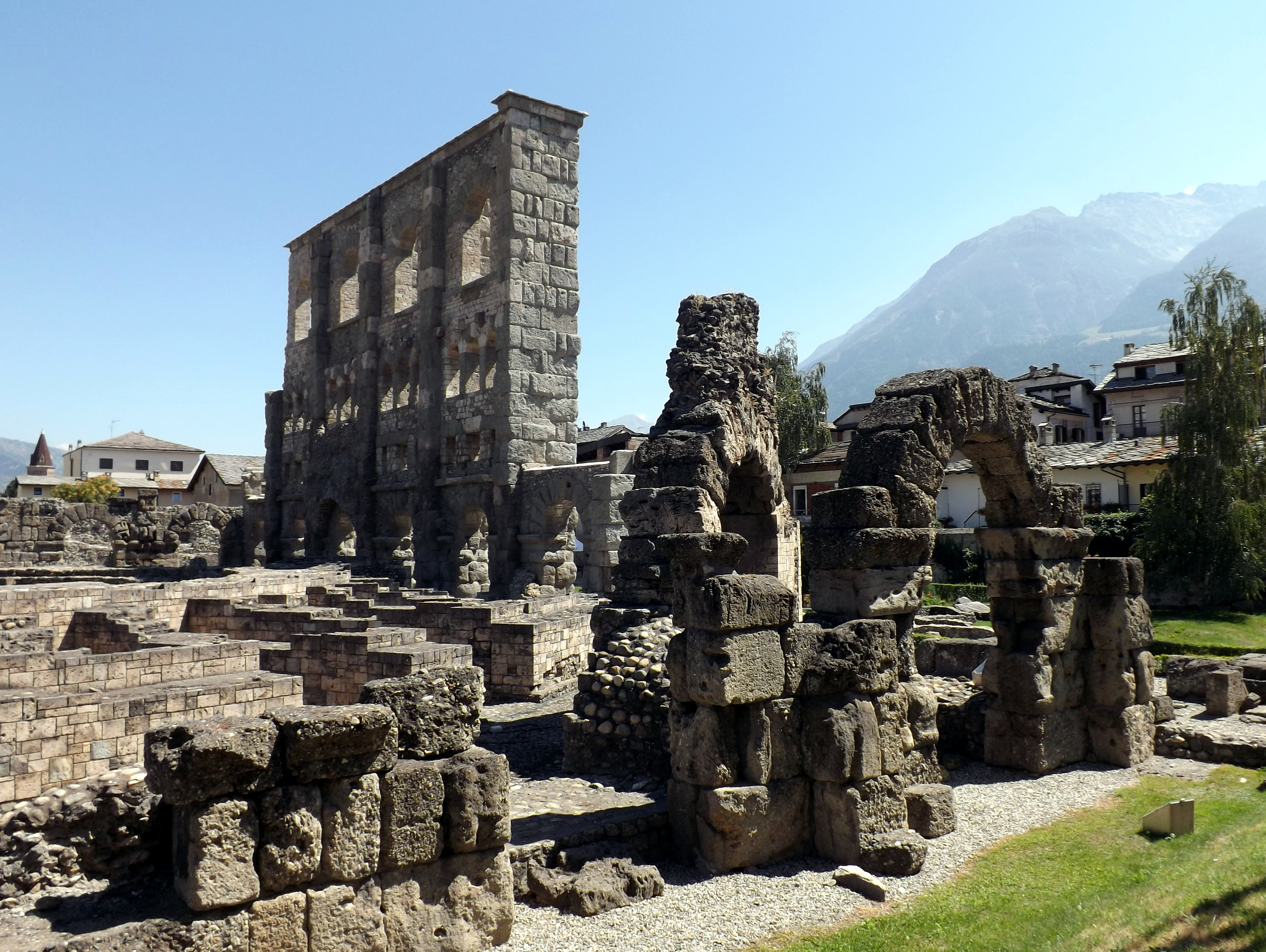
Remains of the theatre.

The Roman Theatre is an ancient building in Aosta, north-western Italy.

It was built in the late reign of Augustus, some decades after the foundation of the city (25 BC), as testified by the presence of pre-existing structures in the area. There was also an amphitheatre, built during the reign of Claudius, located nearby.

It was restored in 2009. Since 2011, theatre is used for music shows and theatrical performs. The theatre was shuttered in 2022 for further restorations costing nearly 5 million euros. It reopened in July 2026.

== Description ==
The theatre occupies three blocks annexed to the ancient city walls, along the Roman main road (the decumanus maximus, next to the Porta Prætoria. The structure occupied an area of 81 by 64 metres (266 by 210 ft), and could contain up to 3,500/4,000 spectators.

What remains today include the southern façade, standing at 22 metres (72 ft). The cavea was enclosed in a rectangular-shaped wall including the remaining southern part. This was reinforced by buttresses each 5.5 metres (18 ft) from the other, and included by four orders of arcades which lightened its structure. It has been supposed that the theatre once had an upper cover, in the same way of the Theatre of Pompey in Rome.

The orchestra had a diameter of 10 metres (33 ft). The scene, of which only the foundations remain, was decorated by Corinthian columns and statues and was covered with marble slabs.

A marketplace surrounded by storehouses on three sides with a temple in the centre with two on the open (south) side, as well as a thermae, also have been discovered.

== See also ==
- List of Roman theatres
