= Roman Theatre, Benevento =

Ancient Roman theater in Benevento, Italy

Coordinates: 41°7′50.47″N 14°46′18.84″E

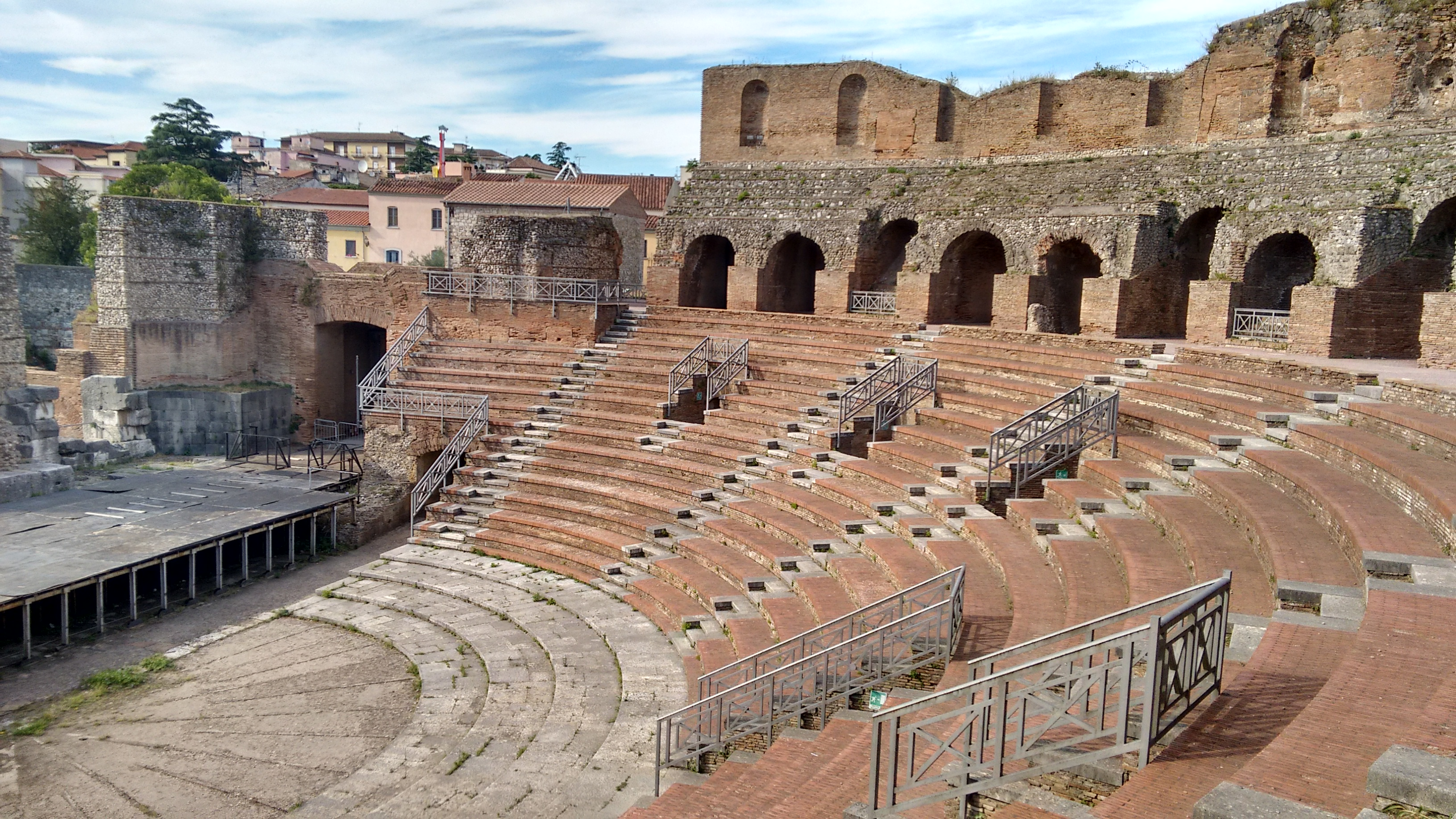
View of the theatre

The Roman Theatre (Italian: Teatro romano di Benevento) is an ancient Roman edifice in Benevento, southern Italy. It was built in the 2nd century by emperor Hadrian near the city's cardo maximus (126 AD). Abandoned in Lombard times, it is now surrounded by the medieval Rione (district) Triggio. The structures is still used for concerts, representations and other spectacles.

== Description ==
The theatre has a semicircular plan with a diameter of 90 meters: it could originally house some 10,000/15,000 spectators.

The exterior had 25 arcades on three orders, of which only the lower one remain, with Tuscan columns (these gave access to the interior alternatively through corridors and stairs) and part of the second one.

The cavea has mostly survived. The large scene features remains of three monumental gates which led to the orchestra; at the latter's side are the remains of the parodoi, of which the right one has kept the pavement mosaic and the polychrome marble walls, which likely characterized most of the theatre originally. Above this hall, in the 18th century, the small church of Santa Maria della Verità was built. Behind the scene, three staircases led to a lower level, which was perhaps used an entrance for artists.

The entrance alley is decorated by masks similar to those used by the actors. Some edifices around the theatre which are still under excavation included perhaps a dancing school and an association of artists.

== See also ==
- List of Roman theatres

== Sources ==
- Zazo, Alfredo (1976). Curiosità storiche Beneventane. Benevento: De Martini.
