= Roman Theatre (Cádiz) =

Ancient Roman theater in Cádiz, Spain

Coordinates: 36.5283°N 6.2897°W

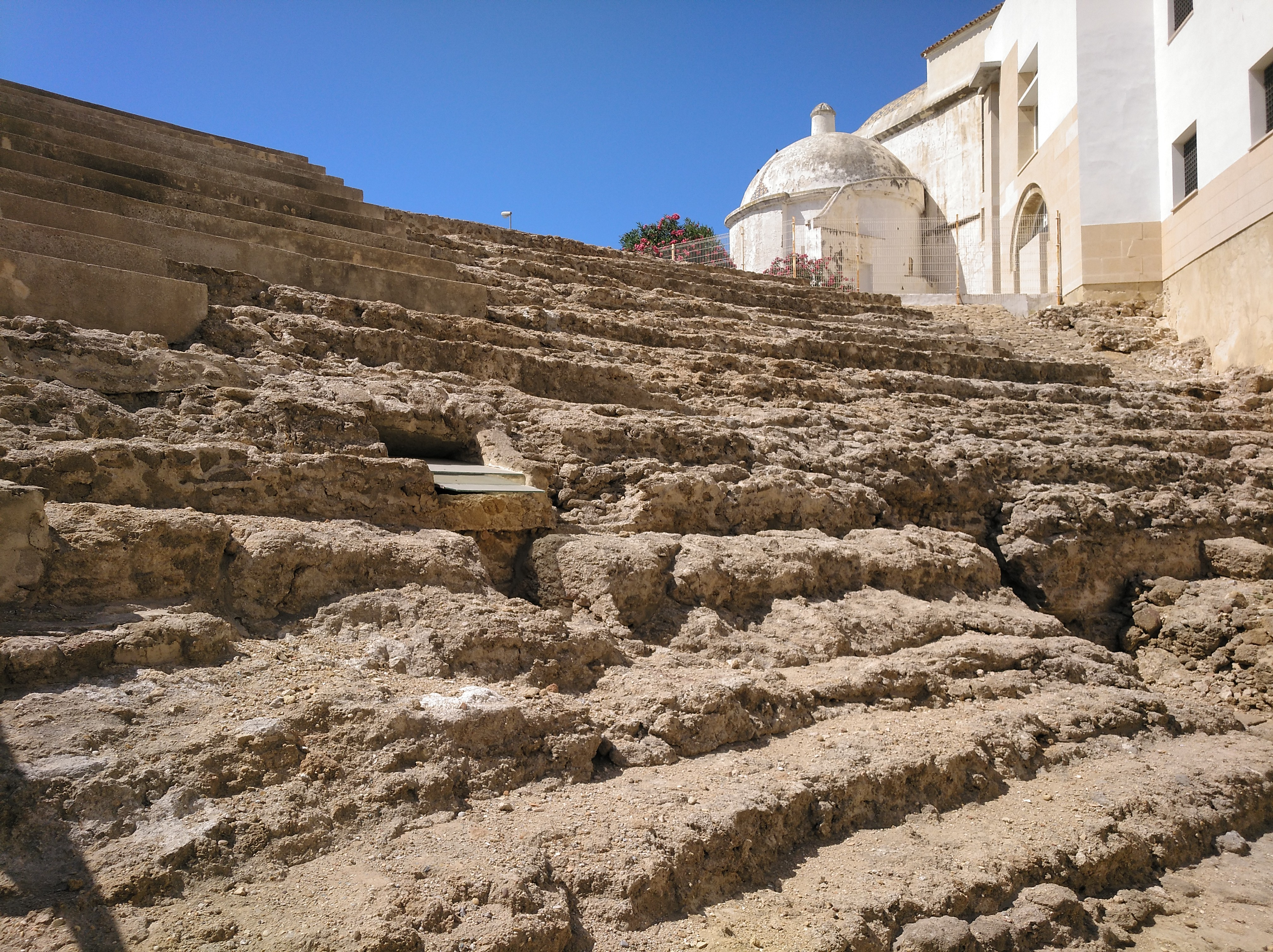
View of the theatre steps, with the domes of the Cádiz Cathedral in the background

The Roman Theatre of Cádiz (Theatrum Balbi) is an ancient structure in Cádiz, Andalusia, in southern Spain. The remains (only partially excavated) were discovered in 1980. The theatre, which was likely built during the 1st century BC and was one of the largest ever built in the Roman Empire, was abandoned in the 4th century and, in the 13th century, a fortress was built on its ruins by order of King Alfonso X of Castile.

The theatre featured a cavea with a diameter of more than 120 meters, and could house some 10,000 spectators. The theatre was one of the few Roman structures of ancient Hispania mentioned by classical authors, including Cicero and Strabo. Excavations in the site started in 1980 and they have also found remains of a quarter dating to the taifa period, Almohad houses and 17th century pits.

== See also ==
- List of Roman theatres
- Roman Amphitheatre (Cádiz)
