= Amphitheatre of Mérida =

Ancient Roman amphitheater in Mérida, Spain

- Anfiteatro de Mérida (Spanish)
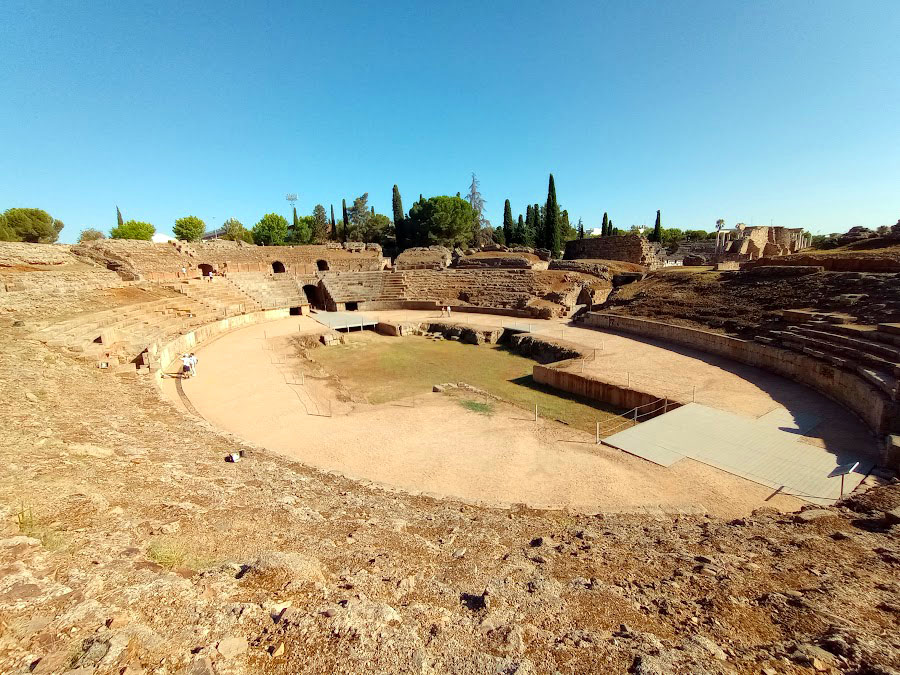
- Interactive map of Amphitheatre of Mérida
- 38°54′58.3″N 6°20′15.8″W
- Type: Roman amphitheatre
- Location: Mérida (Badajoz), Spain

UNESCO World Heritage Site
- Official name: Amphitheatre
- Type: Cultural
- Criteria: iii, iv
- Designated: 1993 (17th session)
- Part of: "Roman Theatre, Amphitheatre, the Amphitheatre House" part of the Archaeological Ensemble of Mérida
- Reference no.: 664-005
- Region: Europe and North America

Spanish Cultural Heritage
- Official name: Anfiteatro Romano
- Type: Non-movable
- Criteria: Monument
- Designated: 13 December 1912
- Reference no.: RI-51-0000108

The Amphitheatre of Mérida is a Roman amphitheatre in the Roman colonia of Emerita Augusta –present-day Mérida, Spain–, capital of the Roman province of Lusitania. It was completed in the year 8 BC, and is currently in ruins. It was used for gladiatorial fights and combats between beasts or men and beasts during ancient Rome.

The city itself, Emerita Augusta, was founded in 25 BC by Augustus, to resettle emeritus soldiers discharged from the Roman army from two veteran legions of the Cantabrian Wars (the Legio V Alaudae and Legio X Gemina). The term emeritus refers to the soldiers, all of whom had been honorably discharged from service.

The amphitheatre was built as part of an entertainment complex together with the Roman Theatre. Nowadays both are part of the Archaeological Ensemble of Mérida, which is one of the largest and most extensive archaeological sites in Spain and that was declared a World Heritage Site by UNESCO in 1993.

== History ==
The amphitheatre was inaugurated in the year 8 BC. This building was intended for gladiatorial fights and combats between beasts or men and beasts and men or beasts or men and beasts (venationes).

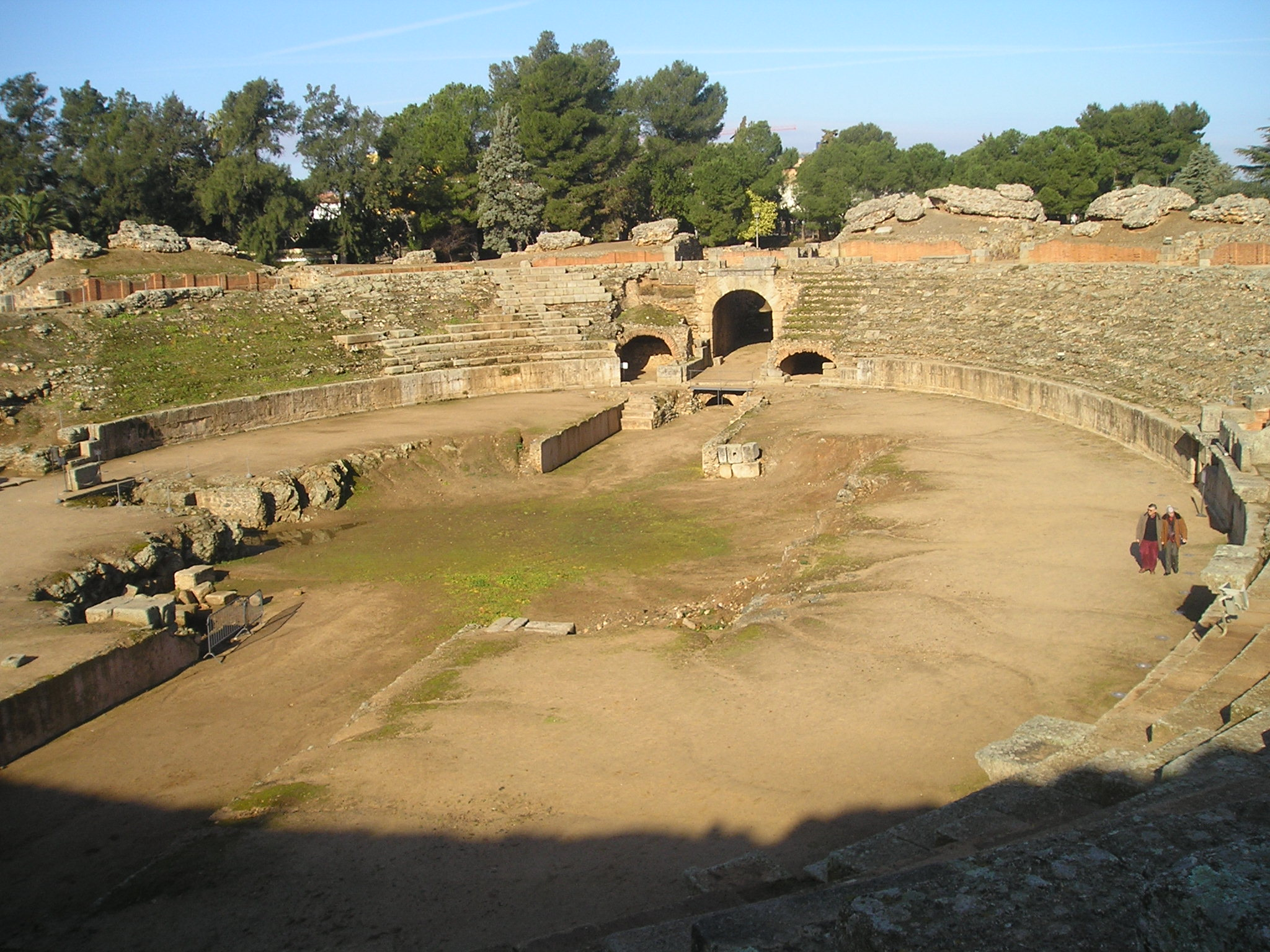
Amphitheatre of Mérida.

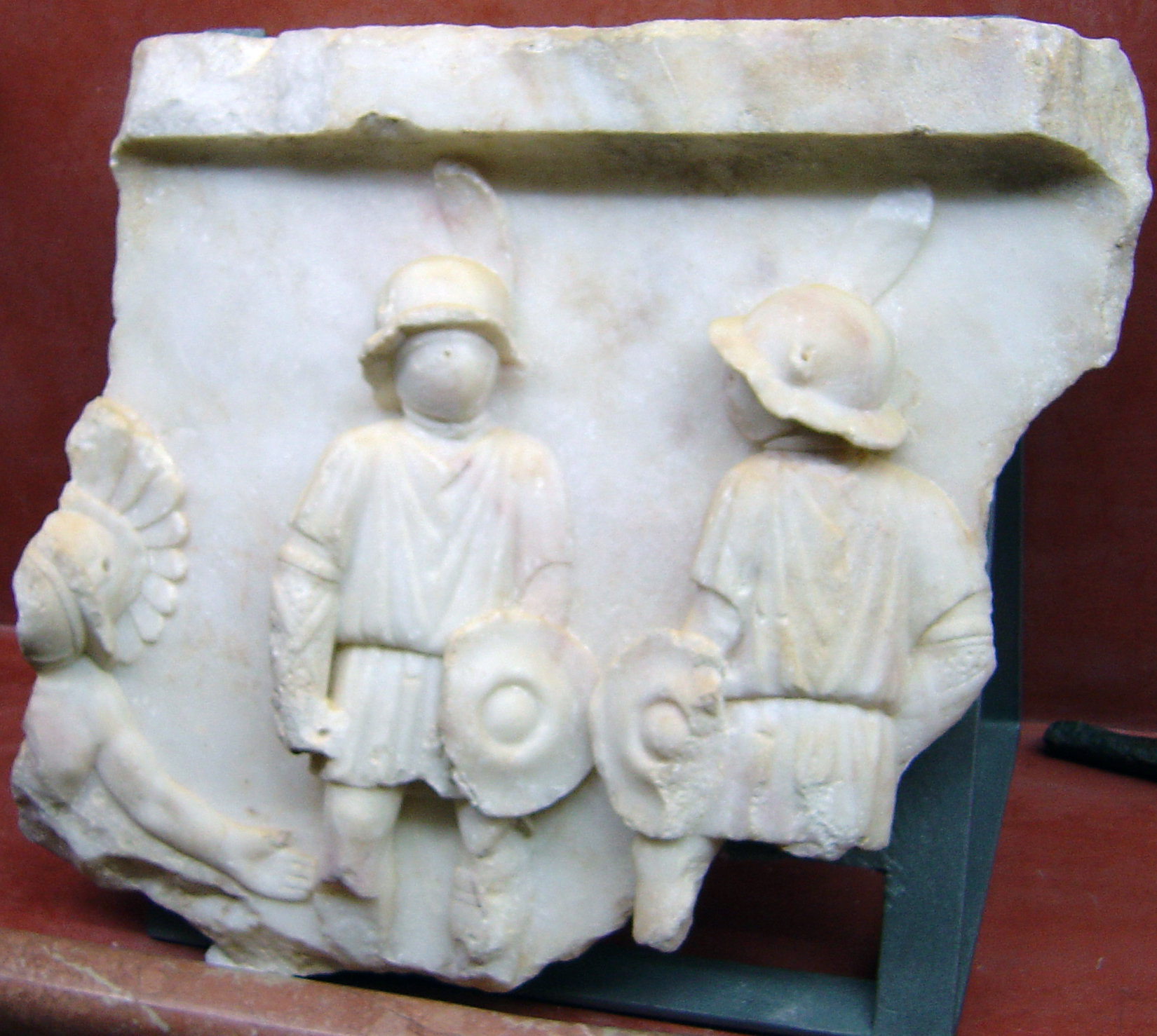
Relief of gladiators from the Amphitheatre of Mérida

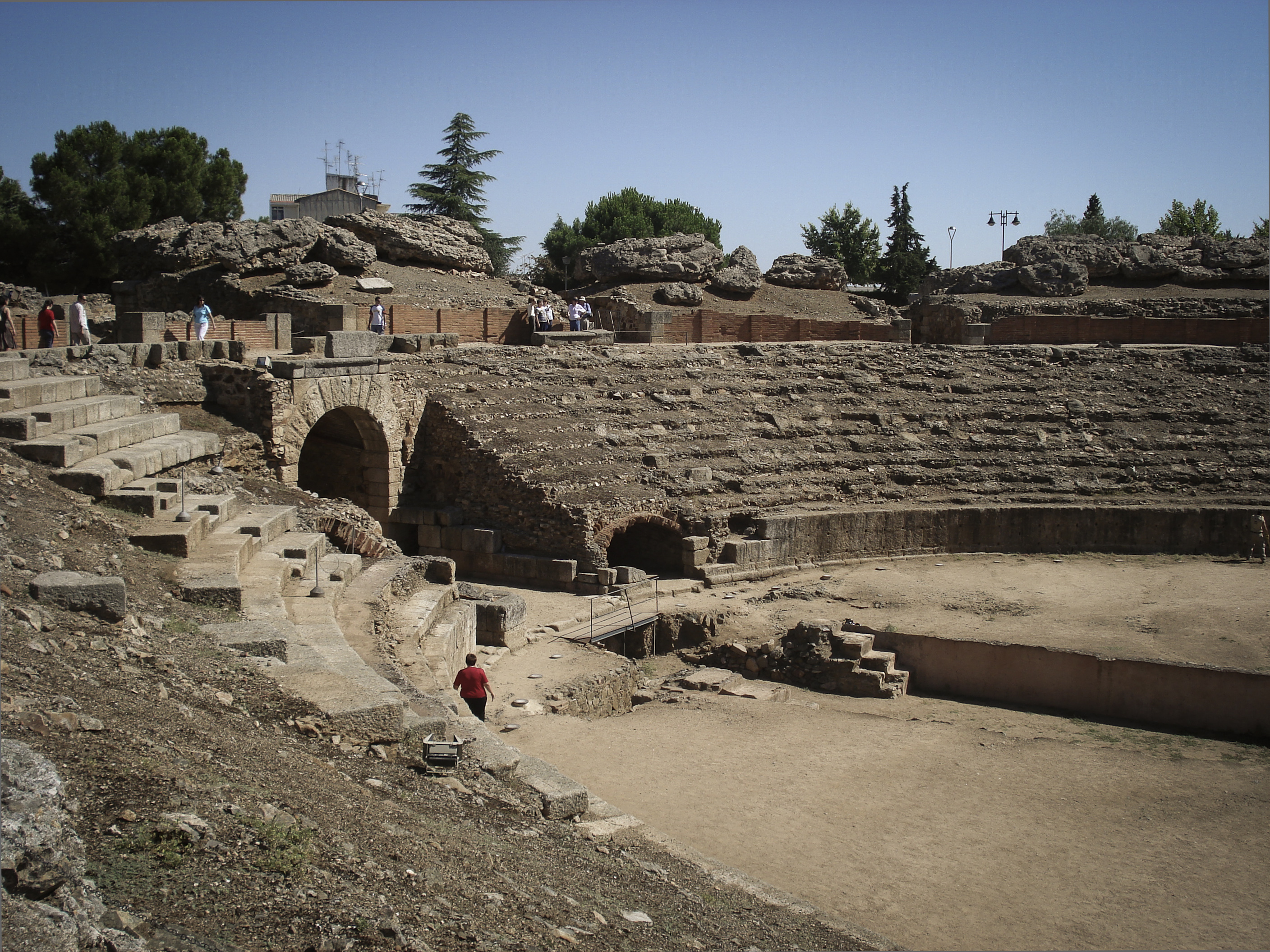
Stands of the Roman amphitheater of Mérida.

== Architectural features ==
The amphitheatre has an elliptical shape, and a major axis of 126 metres (413 ft) and one less than 102 metres (335 ft) with these measures in the arena of 64 metres (210 ft) by 44 metres (144 ft) respectively. The sand-covered arena in the centre had a fossa bestiaria in the center, which was covered with wood and sand. This fossa was used to house animals before they were released into the arena.

Its design consists of a grandstand with ima, media and summa cavea, and a central arena. The stands had a capacity of approximately 15,000 spectators and had supporting stairs and hallways (scalae) that connected the different parts internally. The ima cavea had a row reserved for the local élite and ten more for members of the public. There were also two stands located at both sides of the minor axis: one above the main entrance hall and another in front. Under them were the monumental inscription from which the amphitheatre can be dated.

== See also ==
- List of Roman amphitheatres
