= Roman Amphitheatre (Cádiz) =

Amphitheatrum Balbi
- Location within Spain
- 36.5283°N 6.2897°W
- Location: Barrio de Santa María, Cádiz, Spain

History
- Built: c. 70 BC
- Built for: Lucius Cornelius Balbus
- Demolished: c. 280–300 AD

The Roman Amphitheatre of Cádiz (Amphitheatrum Balbi) was an ancient structure in Cádiz, Andalusia, in southern Spain; it has since been buried underneath the Barrio de Santa María neighbourhood.

== History ==
The plans for the Amphitheatre at Gades arose with the plans of the family of Lucius Cornelius Balbus to urbanise the settlement of Gadir around the Barrio de Santa Maria neighbourhood. It was built around 70 BC, and the final active phase of construction ended around the time the adjacent Theatre was built around 46 BC; it was built to hold 20,000 spectators in the Neápolis district. Gaius Asinius Pollio in a letter to Cicero mentioned both the Amphitheatre and the Theatre in 43 BC in Cicero's Letters to Relatives, and epitaphs from the 40s BC suggest the Balbus family were editores to the Amphitheatre.

The Amphitheatre fell into disuse shortly after the Crisis of the Third Century, probably around c. 280–300 AD, and was extensively looted until the 5th century. Alongside the rest of the Roman foundations of the city, the Amphitheatre was only partly built over by Alfonso X in 1262 after he recaptured Cádiz from the Moors.

Agustín de Horozco attempted to identify the site of the Amphitheatre during the 16th century (it was a vegetable garden known as Huerta del Hoyo (Orchard of the Hollow) in 1562) and a section of the amphitheatre was visible until as late as 1564 when Antón de las Viñas produced an engraving of the surrounding area. By 1724, the Barrio de Santa María matadero was roughly above the site of the Amphitheatre, and by 1800, the remainder of the hollow depression left by the Amphitheatre was levelled and it was no longer in use as a public garden.

Large sections of the Barrio de Santa María neighbourhood were rebuilt during the 19th century and as the population of Cádiz was rapidly growing, more residential buildings were constructed within the Huerta del Hoyo atop the same Roman foundations including the Amphitheatre.

=== Rediscovery ===
After the discovery of the ruins of the Theatre in 1980, triangulation and urban surveys were conducted around the Barrio de Santa María area and confirmed its location was correct on 17th century maps by 1985.

== Archaeology ==
Archaeologists identified that the circular curve of the street layouts at Barrio de Santa María and around the Plaza de San Juan de Dios reflect the original perimeter of the Amphitheatre. They also identified its location to be around 350 metres (1,150 ft) southeast of the excavated Theatre.

Terracotta figurines, oil lamps, and epitaphs were excavated around the site of the Amphitheatre. Alongside the artifacts, during the 20th and 21st centuries, Roman architectural remains have been reported during construction and renovation works in the Barrio de Santa María, including masonry blocks and structural elements associated with the Amphitheatre.

== Description ==
The Amphitheatre was an elliptical structure with a similar major axis diameter as the adjacent Theatre (120 metres (390 ft)), but it had around double the capacity (20,000 spectators). It often held gladiatorial fights.
