= Roman Theatre of Gubbio =

Ancient Roman theater in Gubbio, Italy

Coordinates: 43.351918°N 12.57262°E

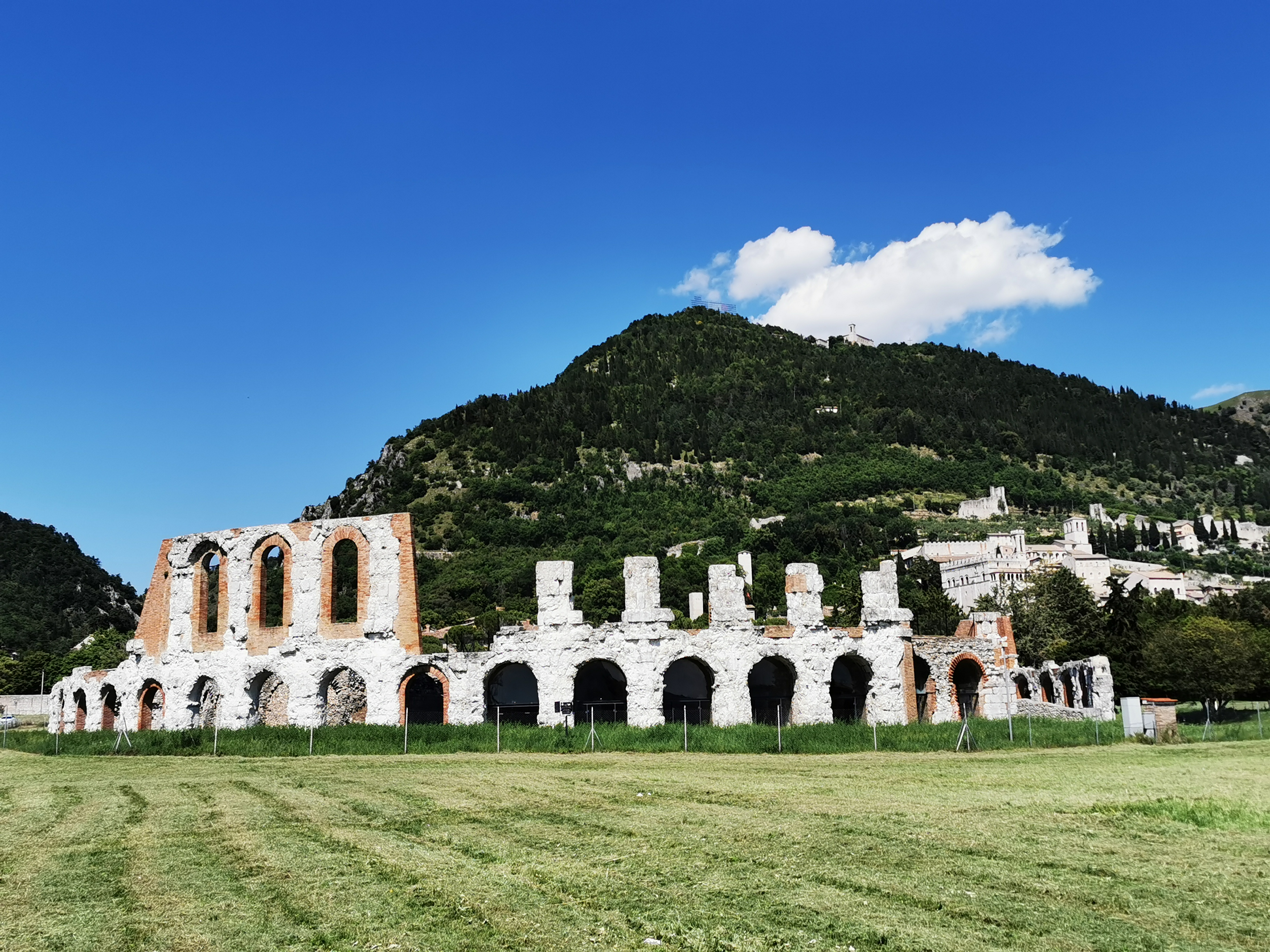
View of the arches From the South

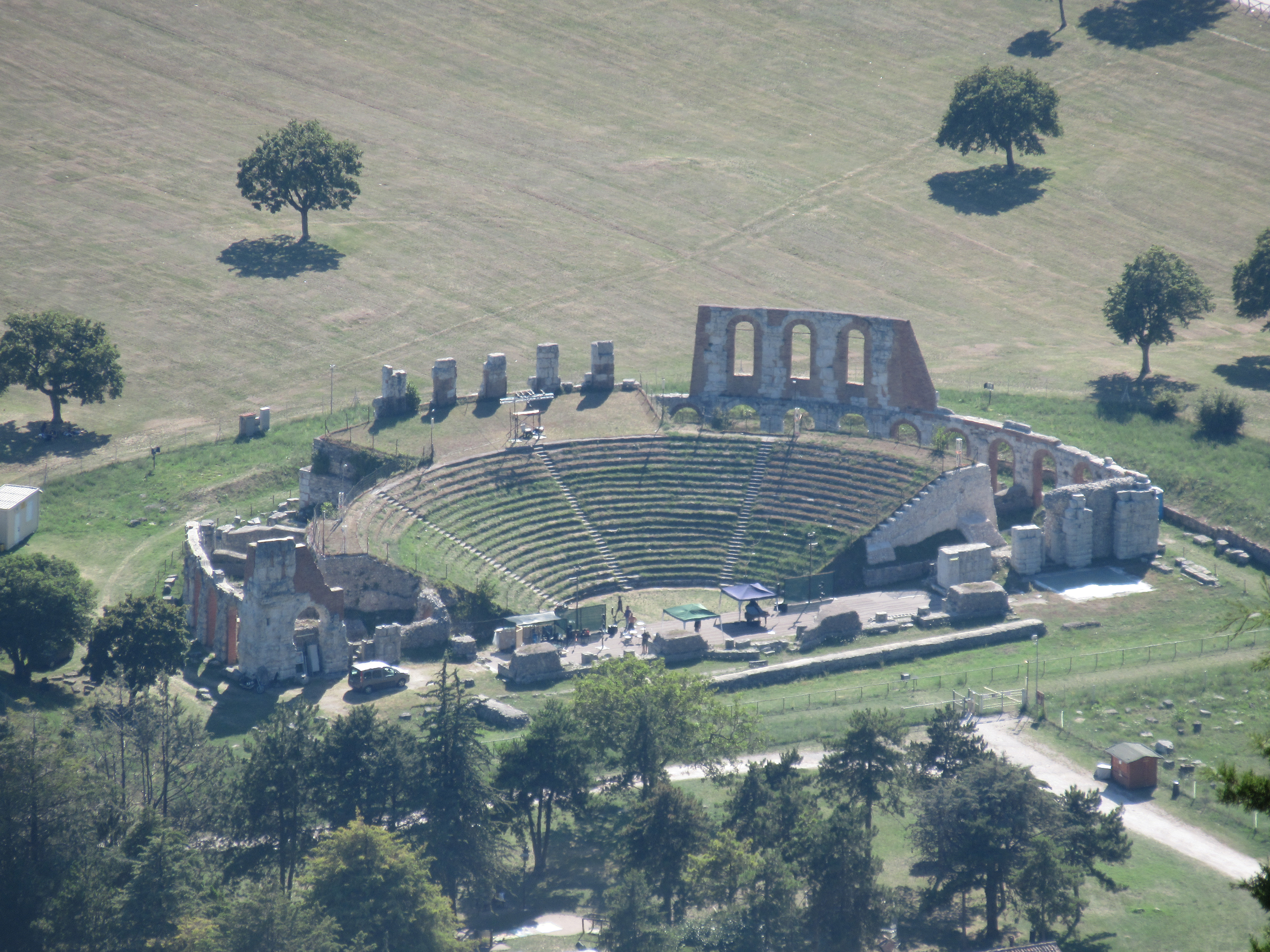
View of the seating from the North

The Teatro Romano or Roman Theatre are the ruins of a 1st-century ancient Roman theatre of the former town of Iguvium (now Gubbio); located in a grassy park just south of the highway SR298 as it passes the centre of the historic town in the region of Umbria, Italy.

The ruins consist of limestone arcades, which originally formed a two-story semicircle with 27 arches. The lower arcade had a vomitorium with a roofed corridor. The theatre originally had an orchestra pit separated from the proscenium by a tall podium. The theatre was expected to seat nearly 6000 people. The present layout derives from restoration efforts in the past two centuries. A nearby museum (antiquarium) displays archeologic finds from Gubbio. In the summer, the theatereis used for some outdoor performances.
