= Theatre Area of Pompeii =

Buildings in Pompeii

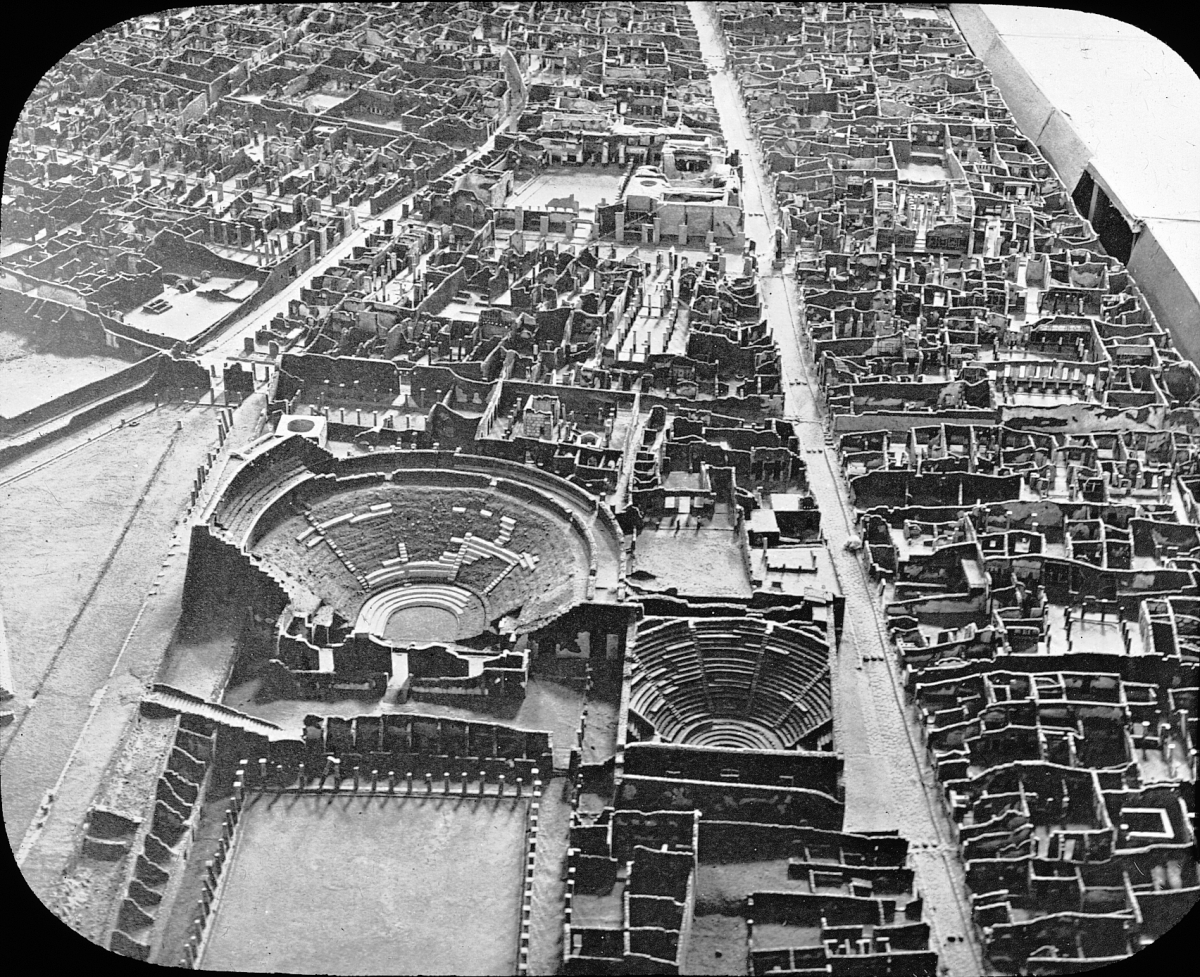
Bird's eye view of the large and small theatres, Pompeii

The theatre area of Pompeii is located in the southwest region of the city. There are three main buildings that make up this area: the Large Theatre, the Odeon (small theatre), and the Quadriporticum. These served as an entertainment and meeting centre of the city. Pompeii had two stone theatres of its own nearly two decades before the first permanent stone theatre was erected in Rome in the 50s BC.

== The Large Theatre ==
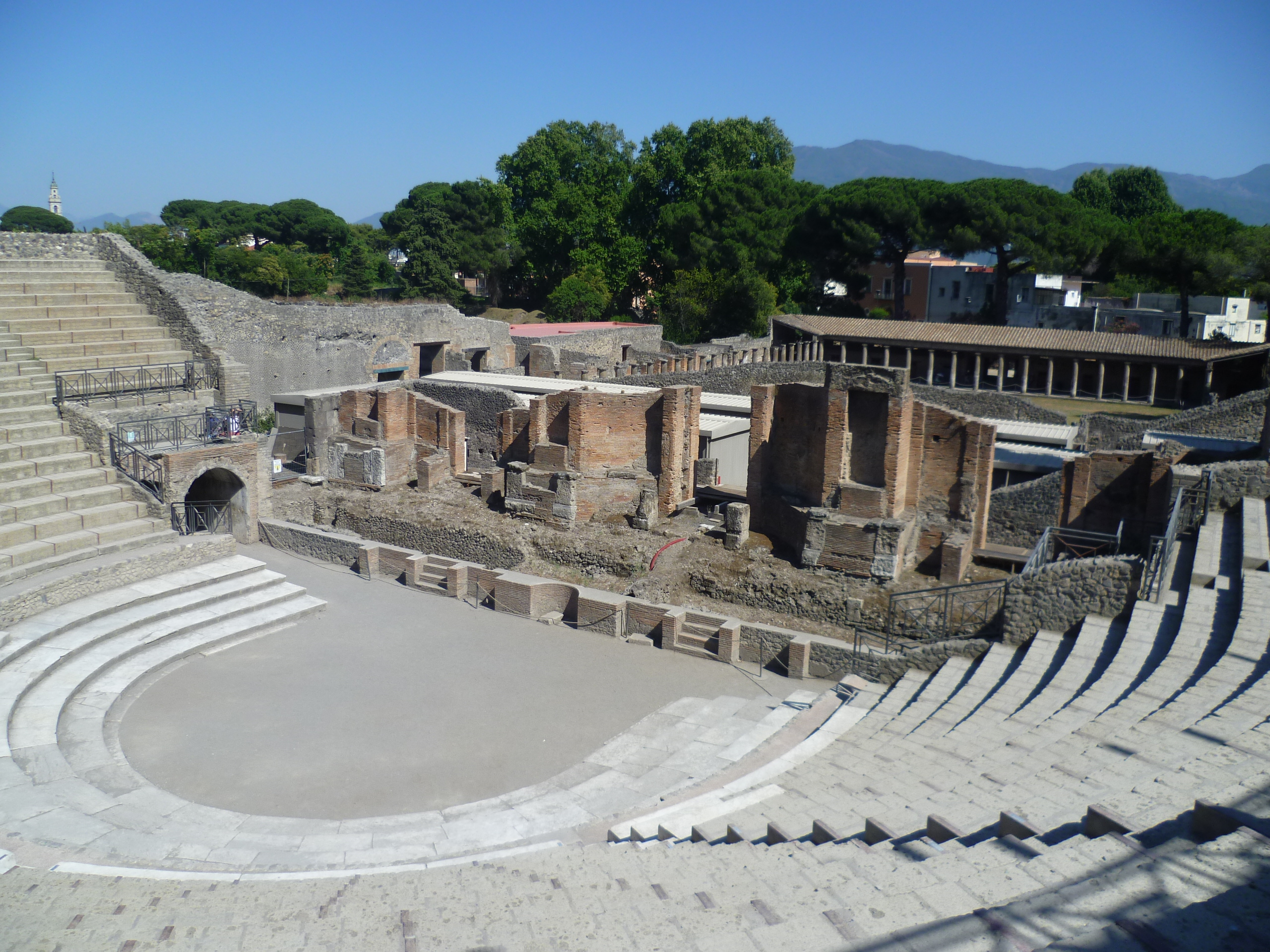
The Large Theatre

The Large Theatre was built into a natural hill in the second century BC and was one of the first permanent stone theatres in the Roman empire. It sat roughly 5,000 spectators. In the Greek style, the tiered seating extends from the orchestra carved out of the hillside. Around 2 BC, the theatre was renovated and presented to the city of Pompeii as a gift by two relatives, M. Holconius Rufus and M. Holconius Celer, according to an inscription in the theatre. Both of these men were wealthy politicians, and acting as benefactors for the renovation would have helped advance their political ambitions in the city. Additionally, both men had experience in political roles pertaining to the relationship between the colony and the emperor, thus it is also possible the Roman-style renovation of the theatre was in-part done as a tribute to the emperor or to further assimilate Pompeii into the greater Roman Empire. The Roman influence is seen above this gallery where four tiers rested upon an arched corridor. The cavae, audience seating area, was divided into three sections: the lowermost section, the ima, was reserved for senators, magistrates, and other noble people; the middle section, the media, sat the middle class; the top, the summa, was reserved for the plebeians. The tiers on the "ima" were wider and not as steep as the "media" or the "summa" to make it more spacious and comfortable for the higher class. The upper class was also separated from the other seating by a short wall, this was to show the class system, and the divide within the social standings of the classes in Rome.

Following the earthquake of 62 AD, renovations were made to the theatre. The colonnade leading to the theatre was converted into barracks for gladiator residence.

The theatre has been used for concerts, operas, and theatre in the modern era. In the 1950s, in an effort to preserve the original steps, iron frames were installed that allowed for wooden boards to be rested upon them to provide seating.

== Odeon ==
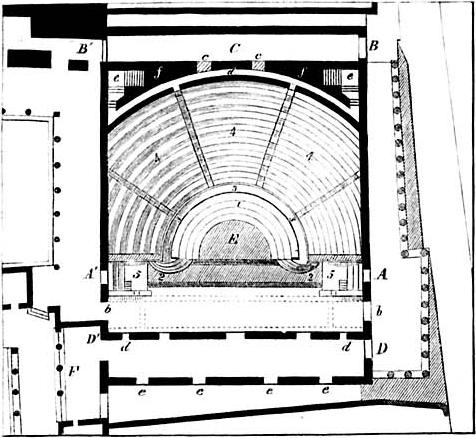
Odeon plan

The Odeon was a smaller roofed theatre, theatrum tectum, that sat 1500 spectators and was built in 80 BC. The theatre follows the plan of other Roman theatres and odeon structures. Where the Large Theatre was used primarily for staging drama, the Odeon was intended for council meetings as well as entertainment.

The thin walls and rectangular plan lead to the conclusion that the roof would have been wood rather than vaulted stone. There are two raised tribunalia, platforms, above the seating that were reserved for important visitors. These platforms are cut off from the general seating completely with entrances from narrow staircases near the stage.

Additionally, modern computer reconstructions have demonstrated optimal acoustic quality in the roofed theatre, specifically citing the setting as ideal for "song and music from weaker instruments like the lyre."

=== The stage and the orchestra ===
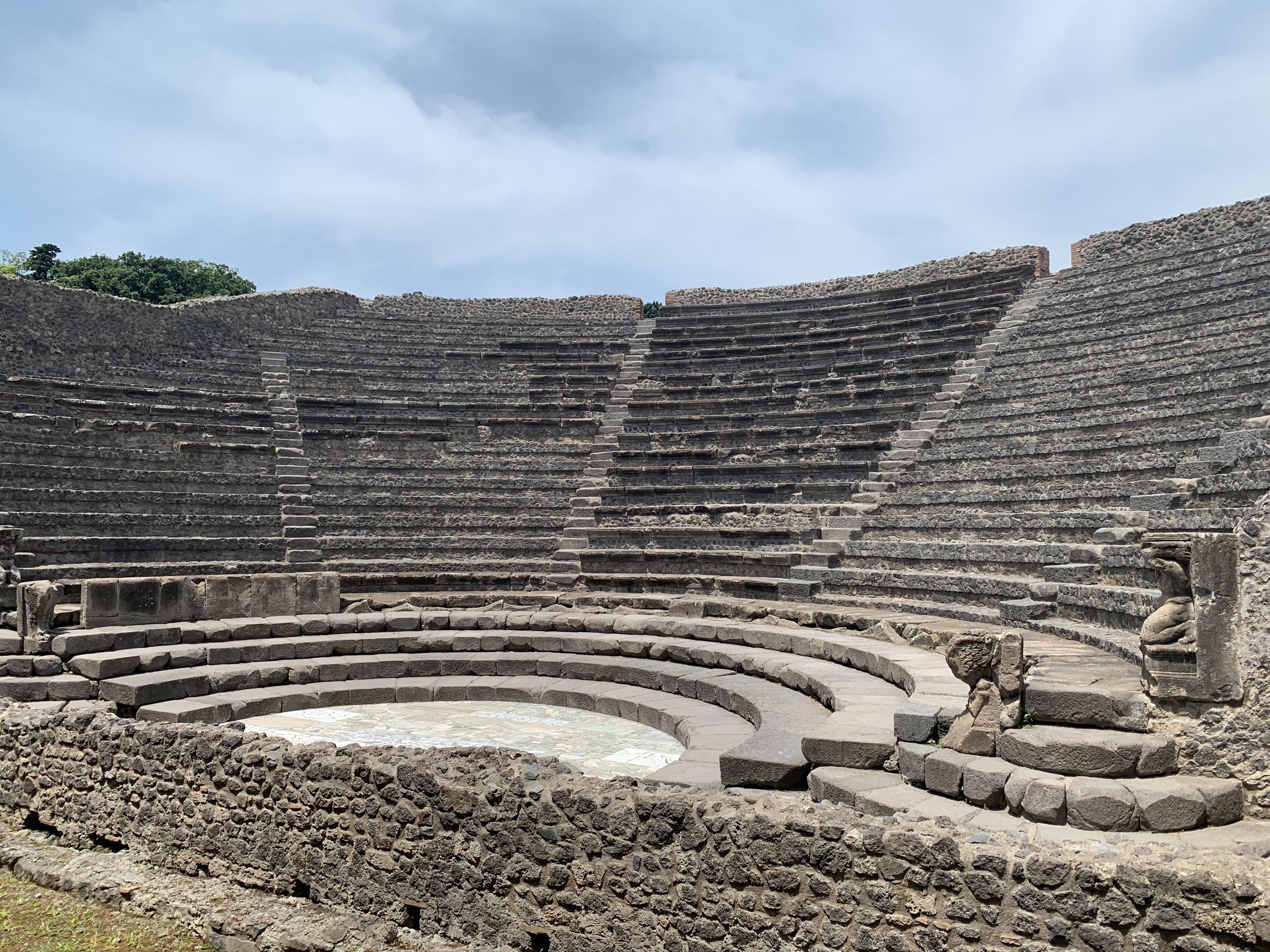
The Odeon

The stage featured five entrances on the back wall. A large palatial double door was at the centre with two smaller double doors on either side. Two small single doors were located at either end. There is a large doorway that opens to a colonnade leading to the Large Theatre at the west end of the stage. Opposite this is a similar doorway opening up to the street. Behind the stage is a long dressing room or postscaenium. Following ancient theatre tradition, a machine used for suspending the gods and heroes was located at the left side of the stage. The orchestra, the semicircle structure below the stage, has been noted for its decor. Excavations have uncovered vividly colored marble and stone opus sectile in the orchestra area of the Odeon.

== Quadriporticum ==
The Quadriporticum served as a passage, porticos post scans, behind the scene of the theatre. It was a covered walkway used by spectators to either travel between events, or just gain cover from the rain. The Quadriporticus was a classic feature of most Hellenic Theatres codified by Vitruvius in De architectura. The interior area of this courtyard was transformed into gladiatorial housing and gyms.

== See also ==
- Amphitheatre of Pompeii
- Theatre of ancient Rome
- Roman theatre (structure)
- Theatre of ancient Greece
