= Roman theatre of Dougga =

Ancient theatre in Teboursouk, Tunisia

- Interactive map of Roman theatre of Dougga
- Type: Theatre
- Location: Dougga, Tunisia

History
- Built: 168; 1858 years ago

Site notes
- Architectural styles: Roman Architecture; Greek Architecture

The Roman theatre of Dougga is an ancient theatre (still in use) located in Teboursouk in the north-west of Tunisia.

== History ==
Like all the other Roman cities of North Africa from the reign of Augustus, Dougga had its own theatre. According to historians, the monument was built between 168 and 169. It is located in the eastern part of the archeological site Dougga, and can host over 3,500 spectators.

The theatre was classified as a monument on 8 June 1891.

== Architecture ==
A dedication engraved into the pediment of the stage and on the portico the dominates the city says the building was commissioned and paid for by P. Marcius Quadratus, and the dedication was celebrated with "scenic representations, distributions of life, a festival, and athletic games".

== Gallery ==
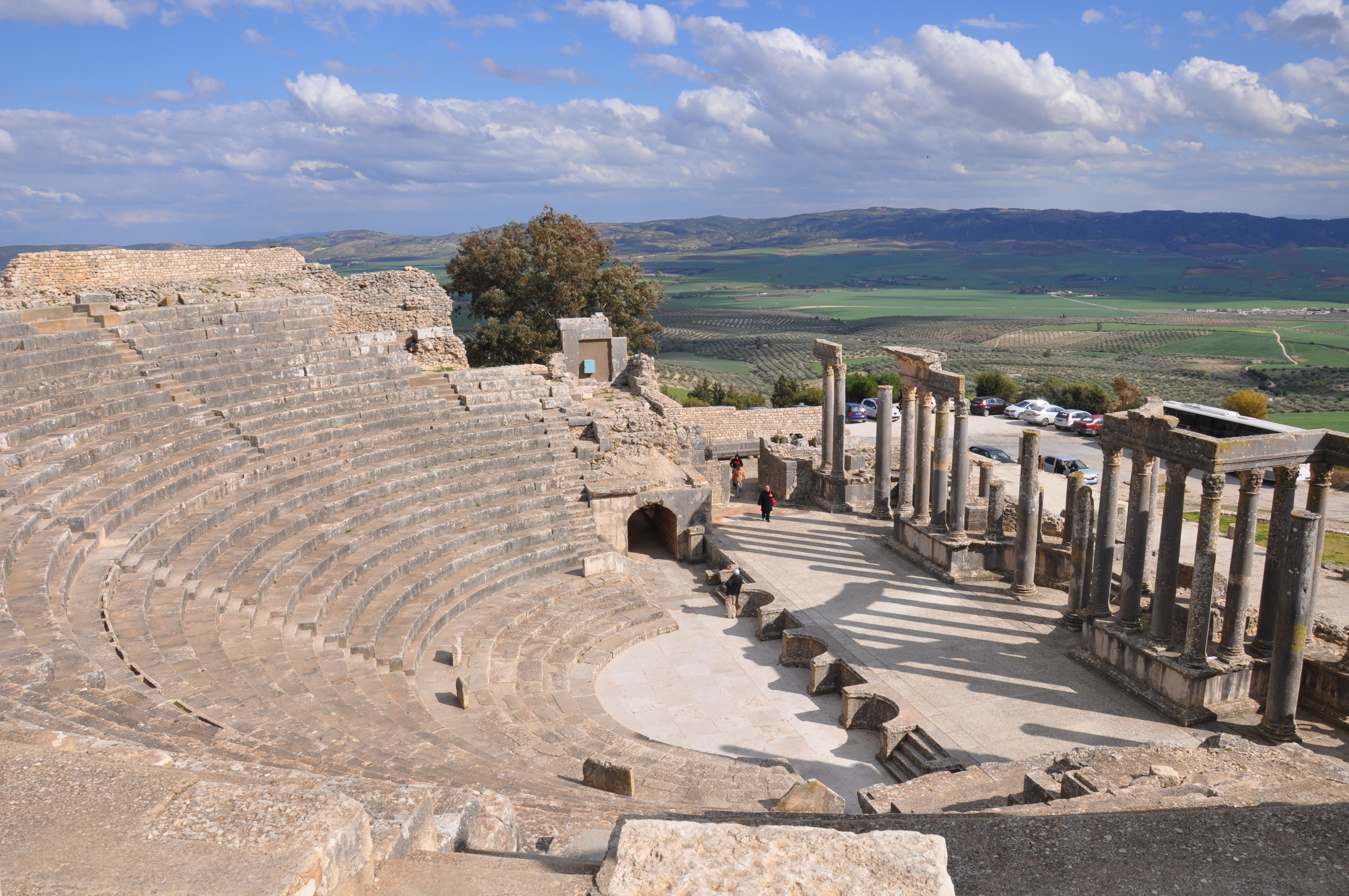
2016

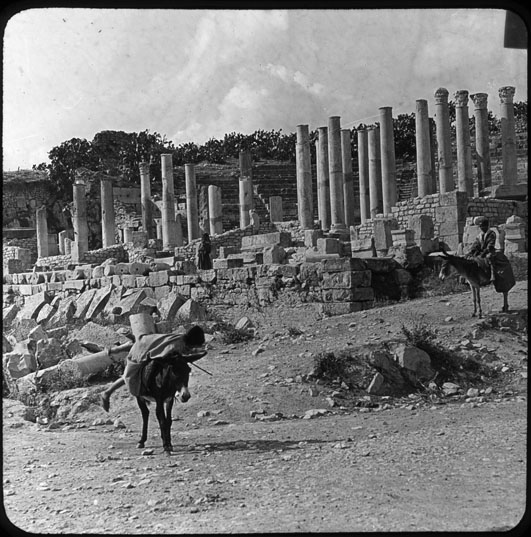
Pre-restoration

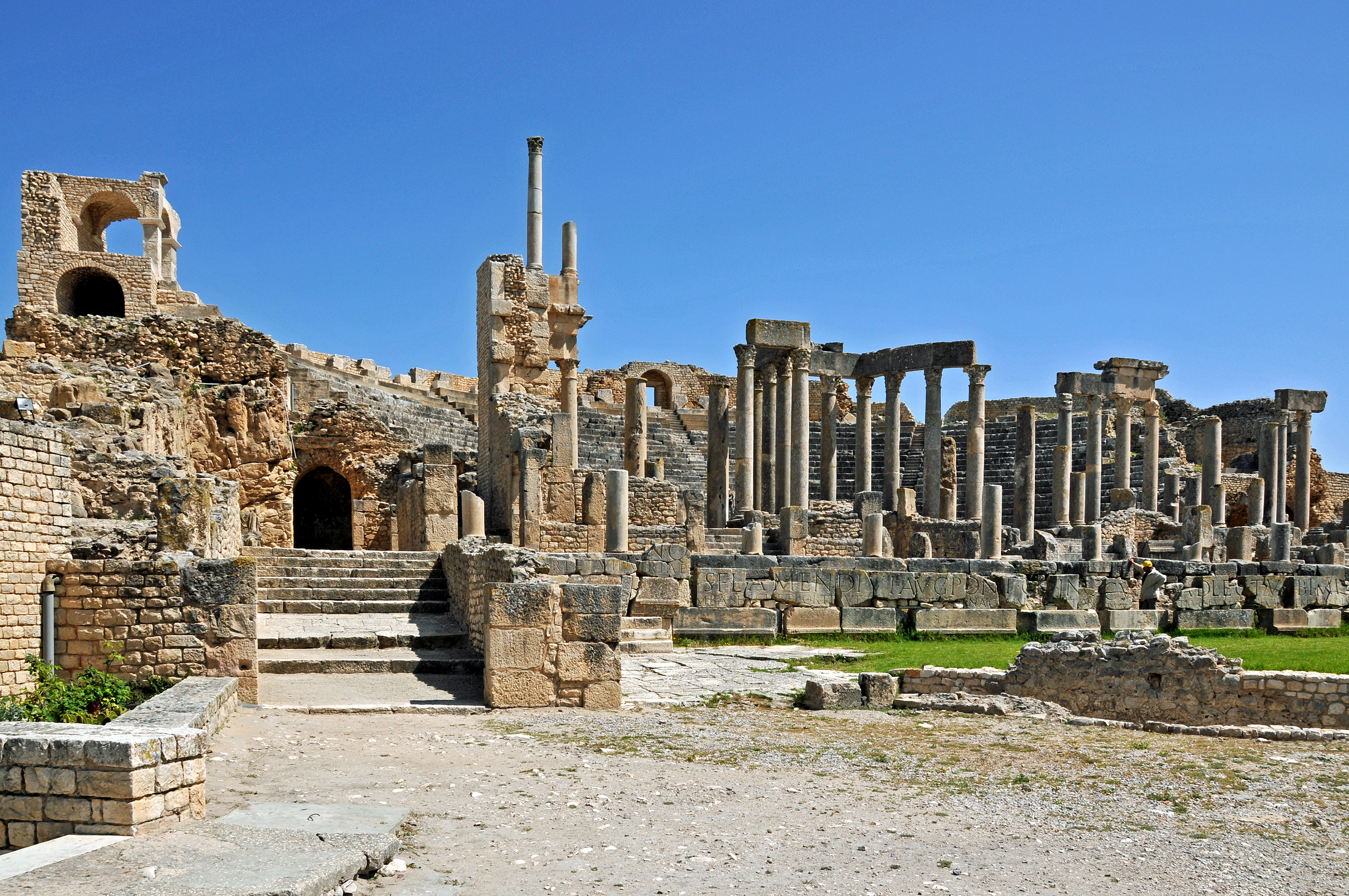
2012

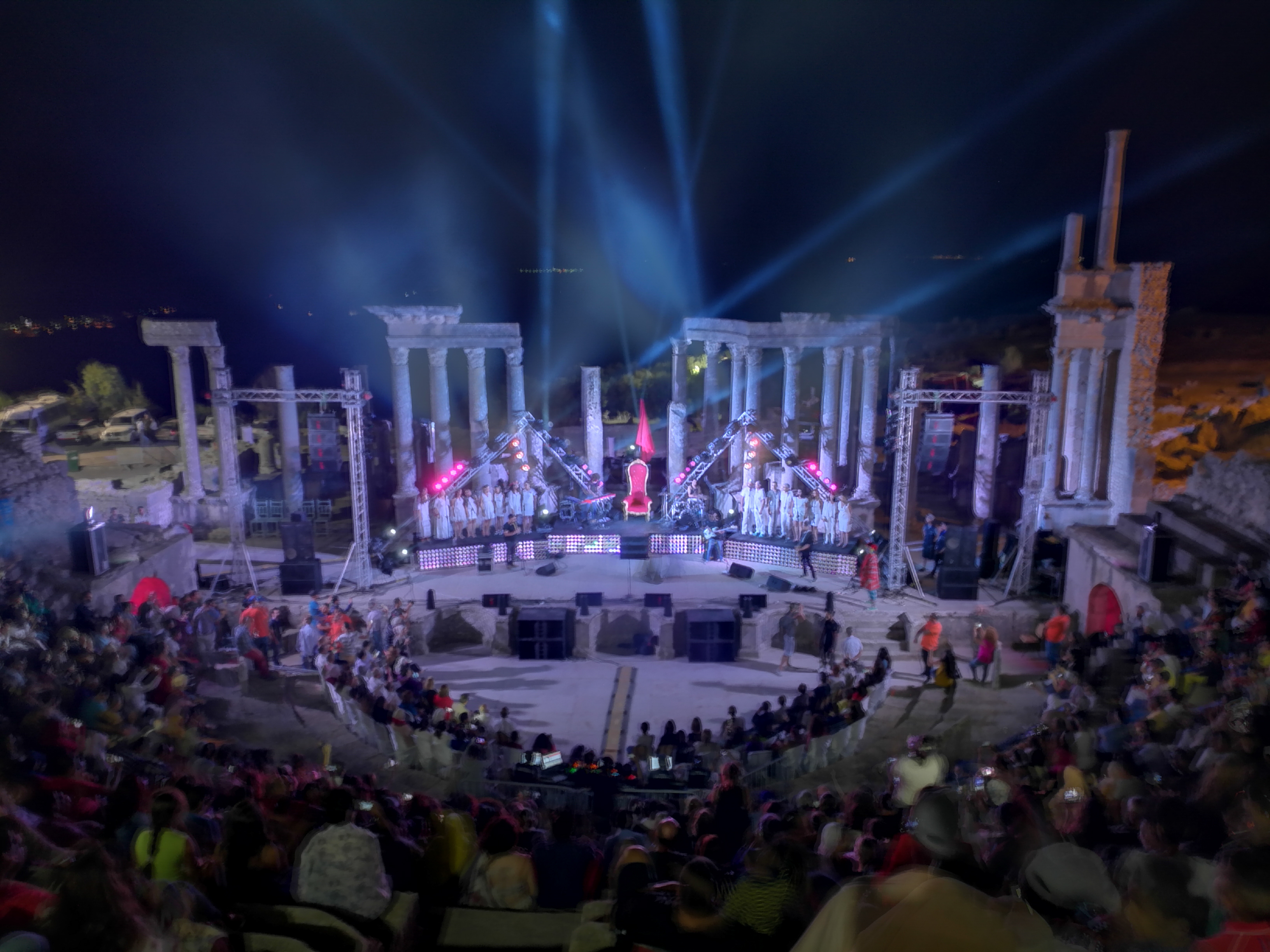
A concert, 2017

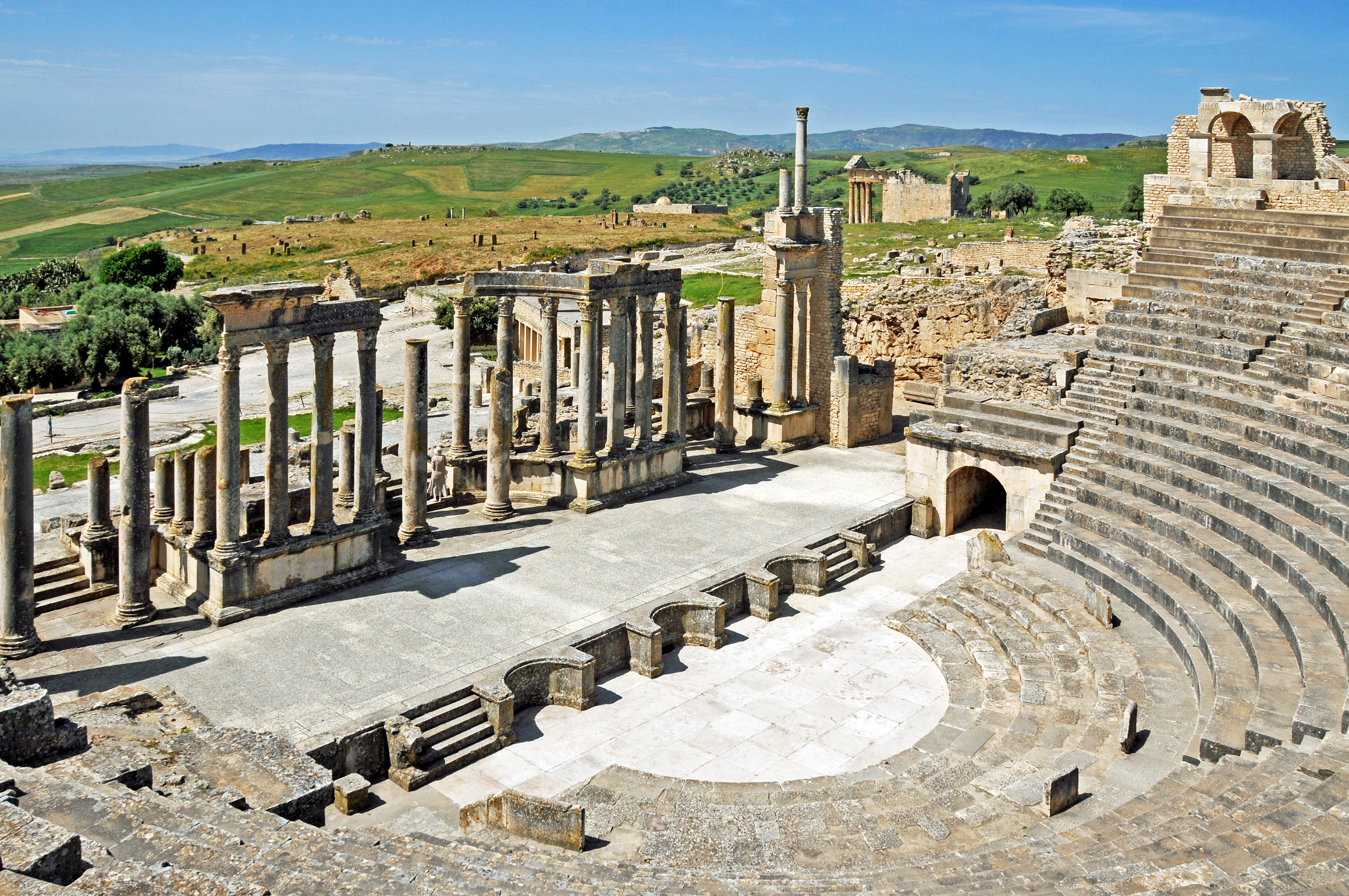
2012

== See also ==
- List of Roman theatres
