= Kom el-Dahab =

- Location in Egypt
- Coordinates: 31°18′50″N 31°49′54″E
- Country: Egypt
- Time zone: UTC+2 (EST)
  - Summer (DST): +3

Kom el-Dahab is the modern name for the ruins of a Roman town in Egypt. Today the remains of the town are located on an Island near Lake Manzala. The remains cover an area of about 16 hectare. The town is planned on a grid pattern with streets running west–east and south–north. In the southern part there is the main street running from west to east. At this street there are the remains of a big, most likely public building. Its function is unknown. It might have been a temple. In the northern part of the town are the remains of a theatre. Even further north are the remains of a storage building.

The ancient name of the town is unknown. Kom el-Dahab is mainly known from surveys and from satellite images. It was never excavated.
