= Cavea =

Seating sections of Greek and Roman theatres

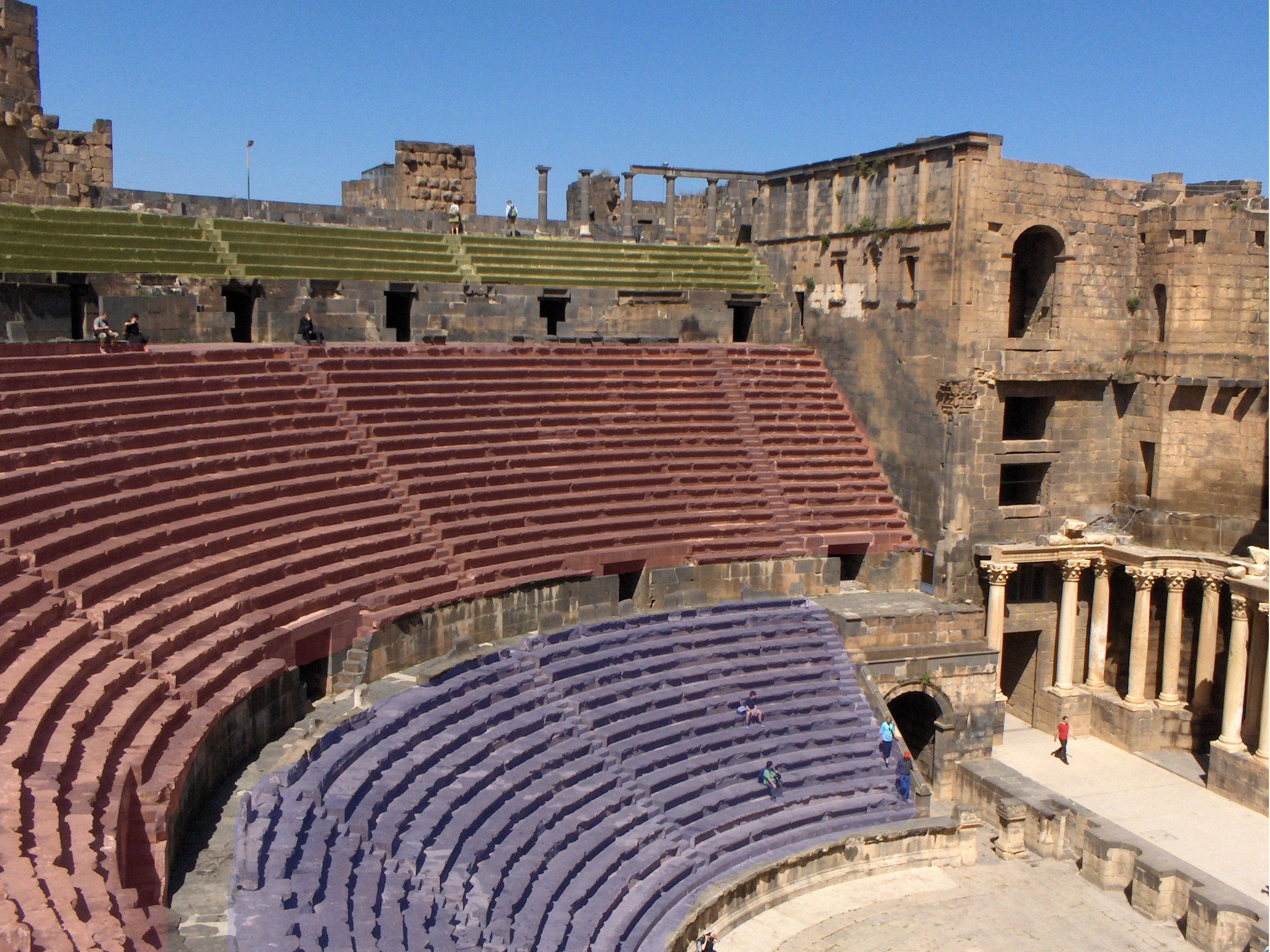
The different levels of the cavea in the Roman Theatre at Bosra. Ima cavea in blue, media cavea in red and summa cavea in yellow.

The cavea (Latin for "enclosure") are the seating sections of Greek and Roman theatres and amphitheatres. In Roman theatres, the cavea is traditionally organised in three horizontal sections, corresponding to the social class of the spectators:

- the ima cavea is the lowest part of the cavea and the one directly surrounding the arena. It was usually reserved for the upper echelons of society.
- the media cavea directly follows the ima cavea and was open to the general public, though mostly reserved for men.
- the summa cavea is the highest section and was usually open to women and children.

Similarly, the front row was called the prima cavea and the last row was called the cavea ultima. The cavea was further divided vertically into cunei. A cuneus (Latin for "wedge"; plural, cunei) was a wedge-shaped division separated by the scalae or stairways.

Cavea also referred to the subterranean cells in which the wild beasts were confined prior to the combats in the Roman arena.

Cavea is also the name for an experimental liquid rocket fuel, with the formal name 1,4,diaza,1,4,dimethyl,bicyclo 2,2,2, octane dinitrate, which was researched as a monopropellant. The name Cavea refers to the cage-like arrangement of carbon atoms in the compound. There was a methylated variant of the compound with a lower freezing point that was named Cavea B. From there on the former Cavea was referred as Cavea A.
