= Tarraco =

Ancient city on the site of modern Tarragona, Catalonia, Spain

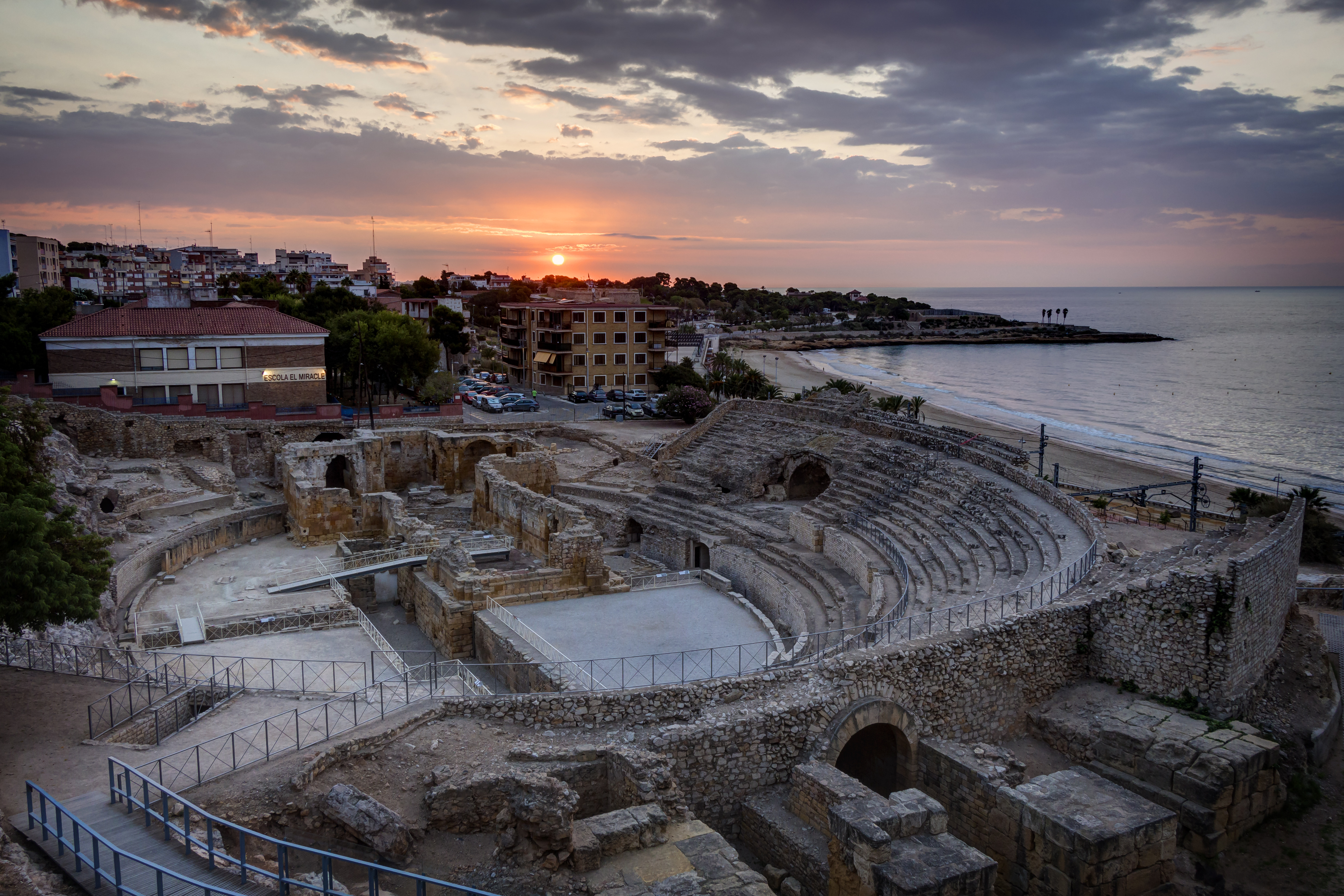
- Amphitheatre of Tarraco.

- Location within Spain
- 41°6′59″N 1°15′19″E
- Type: Settlement
- Cultures: Iberian, Roman
- Location: Tarragona, Catalonia, Spain
- Region: Hispania

UNESCO World Heritage Site
- Official name: Archaeological Ensemble of Tárraco
- Type: Cultural
- Criteria: ii, iii
- Designated: 2000 (24th session)
- Reference no.: 875rev
- Region: Europe and North America

Tarraco is the ancient name of the current city of Tarragona (Catalonia, Spain). It was the oldest Roman settlement on the Iberian Peninsula. It became the capital of Hispania Tarraconensis following the latter's creation during the Roman Empire.

In 2000, the archaeological ensemble of Tarraco was declared a World Heritage Site by UNESCO.

== History ==
=== Origins and the Second Punic War ===
Phases of conquest from 220 to 19 BC

The area was inhabited from the 5th century BC by Iberians, mainly in the Ebro Valley, who had commercial contacts with the Greeks and Phoenicians settled on the coast.

Tarraco is first mentioned after the arrival of Gnaeus Cornelius Scipio Calvus at Empúries in 218 BC at the start of the Second Punic War which began the Roman conquest of Hispania. The Romans conquered a field of Punic supplies for Hannibal's troops near Cissis and took the city. A short time later, the Romans were attacked "not far from Tarraco". Cissis and Tarraco may have been the same city. Cissis may be equated with Kesse, the name on coins of Iberian origin from the 1st and 2nd century BC that were marked according to Roman weight standards.

In 217 BC Roman reinforcements arrived under the command of Publius Scipio, and he and his brother Gnaeus Cornelius are attributed with the enhanced fortification of Tarraco and the establishment of a military port. The Roman city wall was probably constructed on top of the more ancient wall characteristic of the Iberian stonemason.

After the death of the Scipio brothers, Tarraco was Scipio Africanus's (son of Publius) winter base between 211 and 210, and where he met the tribes of Hispania in conventus. The population was largely loyal to the Romans during the war and the fishermen of Tarraco (piscatores Tarraconenses) served with their boats during the siege of Carthago Nova.

=== Roman Republic ===
The conquest of the Iberian Peninsula by the Romans took over 200 years.

During the following two centuries Tarraco remained a supply and winter base camp during the wars against the Celtiberians, as it was during the Second Punic War. There was therefore a strong military presence during this period, possibly in the highest area of what is currently the city's historic quarter, called the Part Alta. In 197 BC, all of the conquered areas, even narrow strips along the Mediterranean coast, were divided between the new provinces of Hispania Ulterior and Hispania Citerior. The capital of Hispania Citerior was principally Carthago Nova but Strabo says that the governors also resided in Tarraco.

The legal status of Tarraco was probably as a conventus civium Romanorum (conventus = meeting of Roman citizens of the province) during the Republic, with two magistri (civilian directors) at its head. Gaius Porcius Cato, consul in the year 114 BC, chose Tarraco as the place of his exile in the year 108, indicating that Tarraco was a free city or at least an ally at that time.

When Caesar conquered supporters of Pompey in 49 BC in Ilerda (Lleida), Tarraco supported his army with food. It is likely that Tarraco received the status of colonia by Julius Caesar after his victory in Munda, around 45 BC, with the epithet Iulia in its formal name: Colonia Iulia Urbs Triumphalis Tarraco, which would remain for the duration of the Empire.

=== Age of Augustus ===
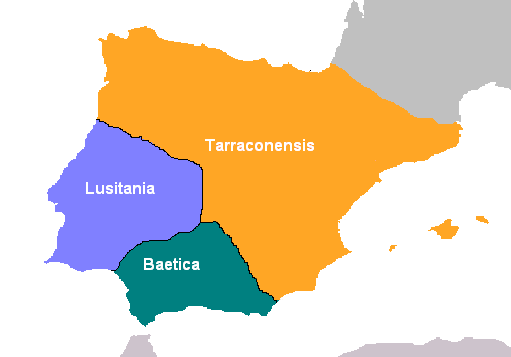
Hispanic provinces after the reform of Augustus

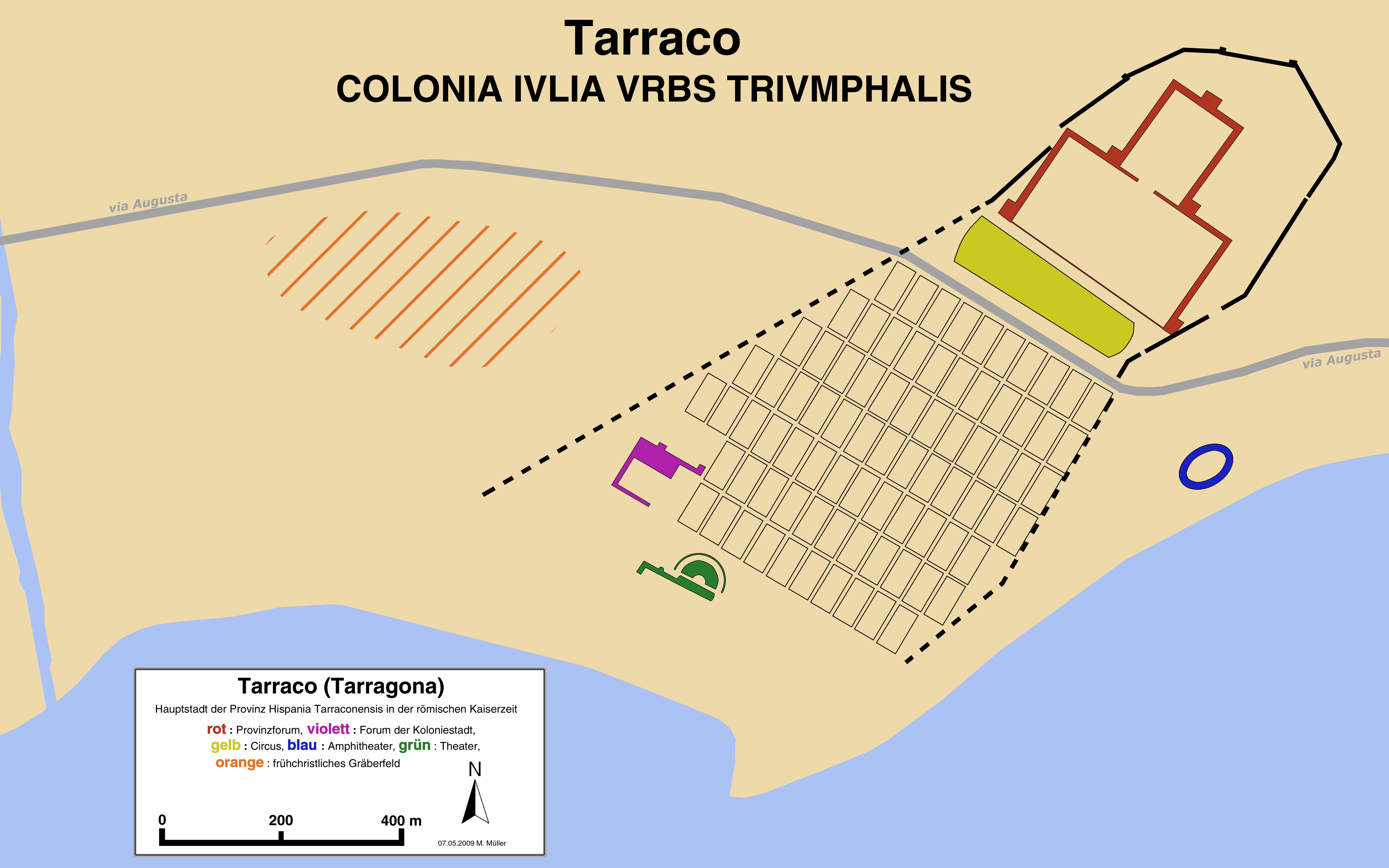
Plan of Tarraco in imperial times showing the main buildings

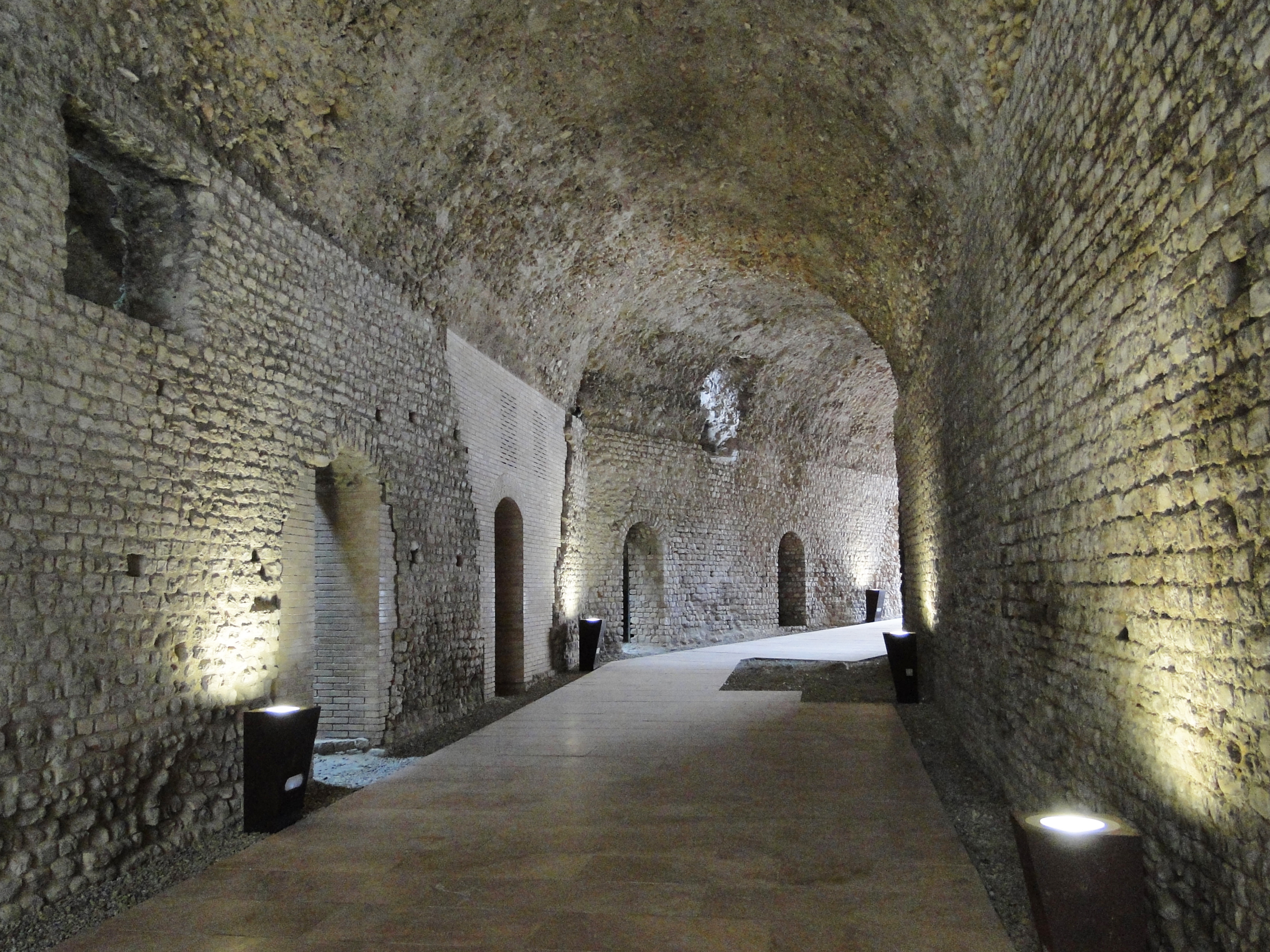
Roman circus

In 27 BC Augustus reorganised the Roman provinces: Hispania Citerior was replaced by the larger province of Hispania Tarraconensis, the name derived from that of its capital, and which included the territories conquered in central, northern and north-western Hispania.

In the same year Augustus went to Spain to monitor the campaigns in Cantabria and due to his poor health he preferred to stay in Tarraco. Apparently, Augustus had built an altar in the city, and a story by the rhetorician Quintilian mentions that the inhabitants of Tarraco boasted to Augustus that a palm tree had miraculously grown on the altar. He replied drily that that would mean it was not used very often.

Soon after he arrived the old via Herculea became the Via Augusta. A milestone, found in Tarragona's Plaça de Braus, mentions the road between 12 and 6 BC, leading to Barcino to the north-east and Dertosa, Saguntum and (Valentia) to the south.

The city flourished under Augustus. The writer Pomponius Mela describes it in the 1st century AD as follows: "Tarraco is the richest port on this coast" (Tarraco urbs est en his oris maritimarum opulentissima). Tarraco under Augustus and Tiberius minted its own coins with depictions of the imperial cult and the inscription CVT, CVTT o CVTTAR.

After the death of Augustus in the year 14 AD, the emperor was officially deified and in 15 AD a temple was erected in his honour, probably in the easternmost neighbourhood of the city or near the Colonial Forum, as mentioned by Tacitus in his annales.

=== High Empire ===
In 68 AD Galba, who lived in Tarraco for eight years, was proclaimed emperor in Clunia Sulpicia. Vespasian began a reorganization of the precarious finances of the state. According to Pliny, this allowed Latin citizenship to be granted to the inhabitants of Hispania. The Iberian peninsula, which since ancient times consisted of urban areas and a land divided by tribal organizations, was transformed into areas organized around urban centers, whether in colonies or municipalities, thereby facilitating tax collection. A rapid increase in construction took place, possibly due to the reorganization of the province. Tarragona Amphitheatre, the temple area, and the Provincial forum at the top of the city were probably built during this period. Most of the statues at these locations were probably placed there between 70 and 180 AD.

The patron of the city Senator Lucius Licinius Sura was appointed under the Emperor Trajan. Sura came from Tarraconensis and reached one of the highest offices of state. In the winter 122–123 AD Hadrian is thought to have visited the city to hold a conventus for Hispania. He also rebuilt the temple of Augustus.

Tarraco started experiencing severe economic difficulties at the end of the 2nd century AD. Few statues were built in honor of the city, probably due to a lack of funds. This period also saw the defeat of the struggle against the Emperor Clodius Albinus, who was supported by the governor of Tarraconensis Novio, Lucius Rufo. At this time inscriptions dedicated to Provinciae Concilium start to disappear to be increasingly replaced by inscriptions dedicated to members of the military. There started being fewer influential merchants in the ordo decurionum (civil administration) and more patroni (large landowners and public senior officials). Severus rebuilt the amphitheater and associated structures, as evidenced by an inscription at the bottom.

=== Late antiquity ===
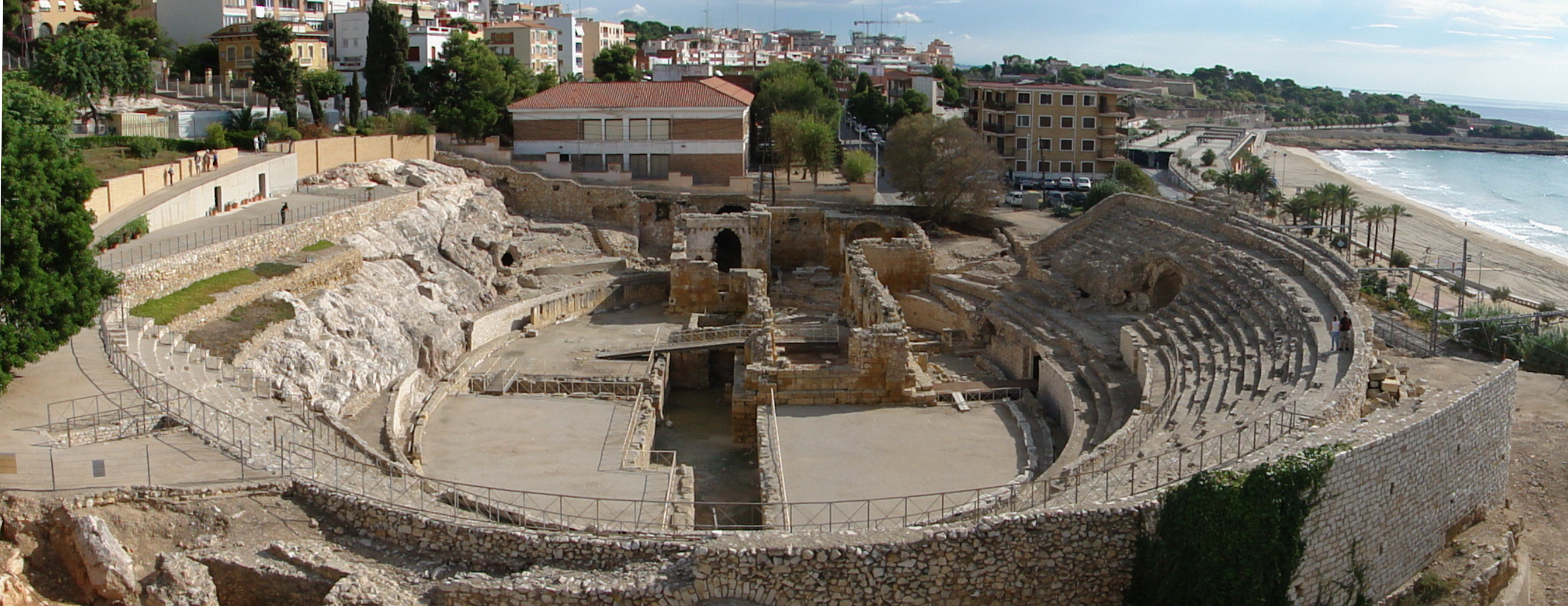
Amphitheatre

After the imperial administration reforms of Diocletian, the peninsula became a diocese divided into six provinces that were much smaller than before. Tarraco remained the capital, but of a much smaller province.

The invasions in about 260 by groups of both Franks and Alemanni created hardships for a decade but excavations have not shown effects of these raids within the city and destruction has only been seen in the harbour area and outside the walls.

A portico of Jupiter was built between Diocletian and Maximian (286 to 293) which may be part of a basílica.

In 476, following the collapse of Roman defenses along the Rhine, Tarraco was occupied by the Visigoths and King Euric. There is no evidence of destruction and apparently the capture of the city was relatively quiet. The Visigoths probably took over existing structures by establishing a small group of nobles, which the existence of Christian tombs in this period seems to confirm. The end of the ancient history of the city came with the arrival of the Muslims in 713 or 714.

== Archaeological ensemble ==
The archaeological ensemble of Tarraco is one of the largest archaeological sites of Roman Hispania preserved in Spain today. Inscriptions on the stones of houses written in Latin and even in Phoenician can be found throughout the city. Part of the foundations of the large Cyclopean walls near the so-called Pilate's offices are believed to be of pre-Roman origins. This building, which was a prison in the 19th century, is said to have been the palace of Augustus. The amphitheatre, located near the seashore stands with large parts of its structure surviving and measures 46 m long.

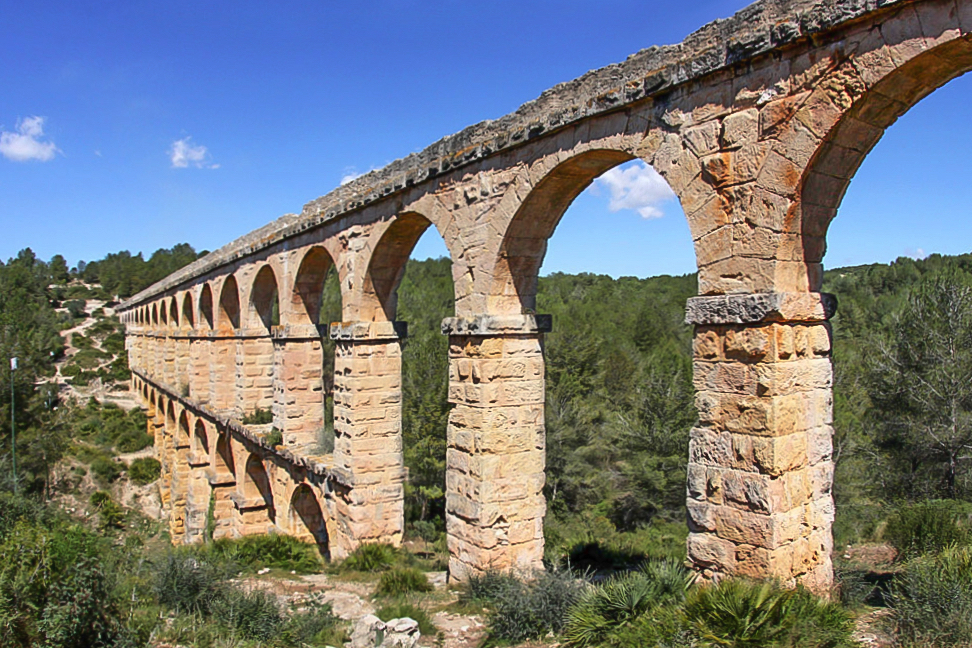
Roman aqueduct, Pont del Diable (1st c. BC)

The Roman Aqueduct de les Ferreres, also called Pont del Diable (Devil's Bridge), crosses a valley about 4 km (2.5 mi) from the city. It is 21 m (69 ft) long, and its lower arches, of which there are two rows, are almost 3 m (9.8 ft) tall. The Roman tomb, called Torre dels Escipions (Tower of the Scipios), lies 1.5 km (0.93 mi) to the north-west of the city.

=== Monuments ===
Code	Name	Place	Coordinates
875-001	Roman walls	Tarragona	41°07′12.4″N 1°15′32.6″E
875-002	Imperial cult enclosure	Tarragona	41°07′10.3″N 1°15′30.0″E
875-003	Provincial forum	Tarragona	41°07′05.0″N 1°15′21.0″E
875-004	The Circus	Tarragona	41°06′56.9″N 1°15′24.5″E
875-005	Colonial forum	Tarragona	41°06′52.5″N 1°14′56.6″E
875-006	The Roman theatre	Tarragona	41°06′48.6″N 1°14′52″E
875-007	The Amphitheatre, the basilica and romanesque church	Tarragona	41°06′53.0″N 1°15′33.5″E
875-008	Early Christian Cemetery	Tarragona	41°06′53.1″N 1°14′18.0″E
875-009	Aqueduct	4 km north of Tarragona	41°08′47.6″N 1°14′36.6″E
875-010	Torre dels Escipions	5 km east of Tarragona	41°07′52.7″N 1°18′59.0″E
875-011	Quarry of El Mèdol	9 km north of Tarragona	41°08′12.7″N 1°20′22.4″E
875-012	The Mausoleum of Centcelles	Constantí, 4.6 km north-northwest of Tarragona	41°09′07.6″N 1°13′49.7″E
875-013	The villa dels Munts	Altafulla, 10 km east of Tarragona	41°08′01.8″N 1°22′22.8″E
875-014	Triumphal Arc de Berà	Roda de Berà, 20 km east of Tarragona	41°10′22.9″N 1°28′07.3″E

=== UNESCO World Heritage Site ===
UNESCO included the ruins of the ancient Roman city of Tarraco on its list of World Heritage Sites, because they meet two criteria:

Criterion ii. The Roman remains of Tarraco are of exceptional importance in the Roman development of planning and urban design and served as model for provincial capitals elsewhere in the Roman world. Criterion iii. Tarraco provides an eloquent and unparalleled testimony in the history of the Mediterranean lands in antiquity.

== See also ==
- Romanization of Hispania
