= Adamswiller =

- Commune
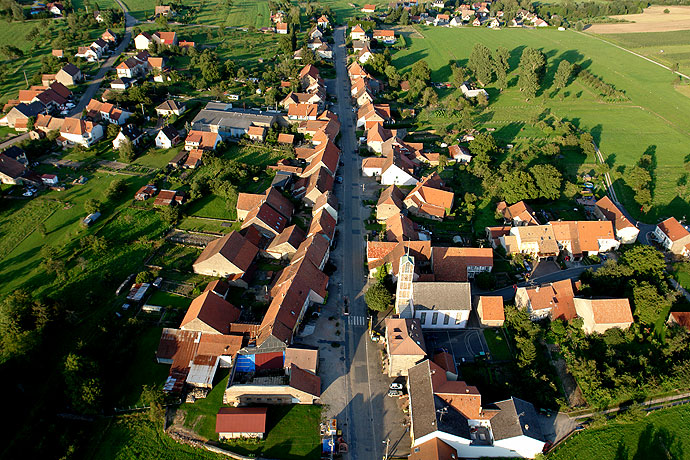
- An aerial view of Adamswiller

- Coat of arms
- Location of Adamswiller
- Location within France Location within Grand Est
- Coordinates: 48°54′19″N 7°12′13″E
- Country: France
- Region: Grand Est
- Department: Bas-Rhin
- Arrondissement: Saverne
- Canton: Ingwiller
- Intercommunality: Alsace Bossue

Government
  - Mayor (2020–2026): Alain Saemann
- Area^{1}: 3.4 km^{2} (1.3 sq mi)
- Highest elevation: 303 m (994 ft)
- Lowest elevation: 234 m (768 ft)
- Population (2023): 407
  - Density: 120/km^{2} (310/sq mi)
- Time zone: UTC+01:00 (CET)
  - Summer (DST): UTC+02:00 (CEST)
- INSEE/Postal code: 67002 /67320
- ^{1} French Land Register data, which excludes lakes, ponds, glaciers > 1 km^{2} (0.386 sq mi or 247 acres) and river estuaries.

Adamswiller (German: Adamsweiler) is a commune in the Bas-Rhin department in the Grand Est region of northeastern France.

== Geography ==
Adamswiller is located some 20 km north by north-west of Phalsbourg and 20 km south-east of Sarralbe. The D9 road from Mackwiller passes south through the western part of the commune on the way to Durstel in the south. The D182 runs off the D9 in the commune to Rexingen in the south-west. There is also the D239 road from the village going north-east to join the D919 road just outside the commune. The commune is mostly farmland with a little forest in the east.

The commune is renowned for its pink sandstone from the north-east of the commune which has been approved for the restoration of historical monuments.

The Eichel river forms the north-western border of the commune and the Marstbach forms the western border. The commune lies within the Northern Vosges Regional Natural Park.

== History ==
The commune was formerly part of the County of La Petite-Pierre. Between Adamswiller and Mackwiller there have been found ancient tombs which have been given the name Totdenberg due to the heights on which they were found (The hill of the Dead).

=== Heraldry ===
Arms of Adamswiller	Blazon: Or, a chevron of gules in base Argent.

== Toponymy ==
- 1281: Adelmanswiler
- 1793: Adamsweiller
- 1801: Adamswiler

In German: Adamsweiler.

== Administration ==
List of Successive Mayors of Adamswiller

From	To	Name	Party
2001	2014	François Brua	
2014	2020	Armand Moritz	DVD
2020	2026	Alain Saemann	

== Population ==
The inhabitants of the commune are known as Adamswillerois or Adamswilleroises in French.

Historical population

Year	Pop.	±% p.a.
1793	215	—
1821	326	+1.50%
1846	305	−0.27%
1871	299	−0.08%
1900	313	+0.16%
1926	332	+0.23%
1946	356	+0.35%
1962	406	+0.82%
1968	427	+0.84%

Year	Pop.	±% p.a.
1975	429	+0.07%
1982	460	+1.00%
1990	469	+0.24%
1999	459	−0.24%
2007	376	−2.46%
2012	408	+1.65%
2017	377	−1.57%
2023	407	+1.28%

Source: EHESS and INSEE

== Culture and heritage ==
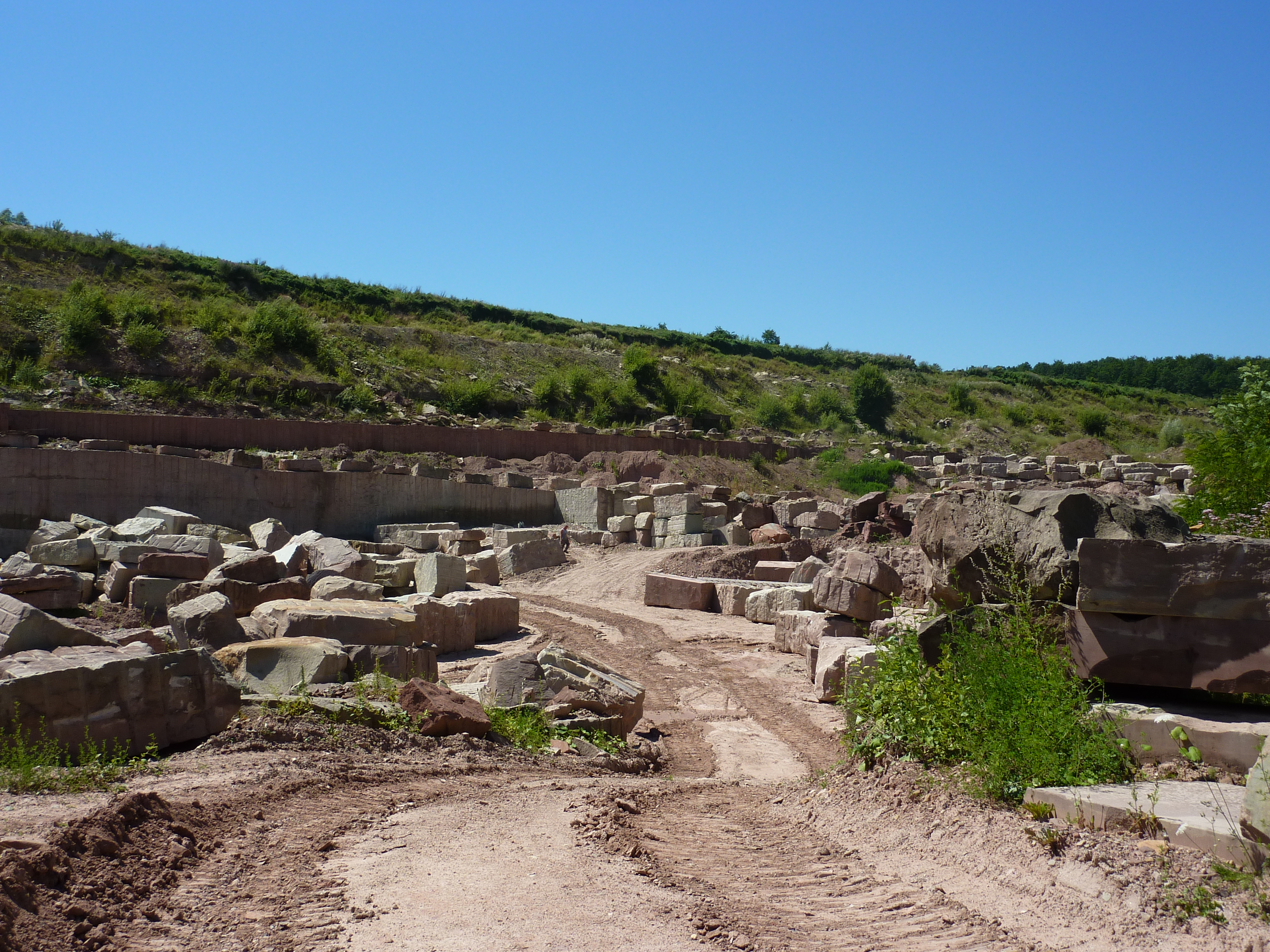
The Rauschen Sandstone Quarry

=== Civil heritage ===
The commune has a number of buildings and structures that are registered as historical monuments:

- A Blacksmith's House at 27 Rue Principale (1881)
- The Town Hall / School at 44 Rue Principale (19th century)
- A Farmhouse at 51 Rue Principale (1825)
- A Farmhouse at 55 Rue Principale (1909)
- The Au Cheval Noir restaurant at 59 Rue Principale (1857)
- The Weaver's House at 68 Rue Principale (1821)
- The Worker's House at 69 Rue Principale (1835)
- A Restaurant at 73 Rue Principale (1895)
- The Totenberg Tile Factory at RD 239 (1806)
- Houses and Farms
- A Public Bench at 12 Rue du Moulin

(1856) is registered as an historical object.[18]

Other sites of interest

- The Rauscher Quarry

=== Religious heritage ===
The commune has several religious buildings and structures that are registered as historical monuments:

- A Monstrance Altar Bench at CD 239 (1856)
- A Lutheran Church at Rue Principale (1836). The Church has several items which are registered as historical objects:
  - The Furniture in the Church (Supplementary)
  - The Organ (1846)
  - A Baptismal Ewer and Basin (19th century)
- The Cemetery (1905). All movable items in the Cemetery are registered as historical objects.

== See also ==
- Communes of the Bas-Rhin department
- Communes of the Bas-Rhin department sorted by arrondissements and cantons
- Communities of Communes of the Bas-Rhin département
- Arrondissements of the Bas-Rhin département
- Cantons of the Bas-Rhin département

=== External links ===
- Adamswiller on the old National Geographic Institute website (in French)
- Adamswiller on Géoportail, National Geographic Institute (IGN) website (in French)
- Adamsweiller on the 1750 Cassini Map
