= Michał Gawlikowski =

Michał Gawlikowski (born 28 April 1940 in Warsaw) - Polish archaeologist and epigraphist, Professor of Humanities.

== Professional career ==
Professor Michał Gawlikowski is one of the most distinguished Polish archaeologists, he studied under the mentorship of Professor Kazimierz Michałowski.

=== Archaeological research ===
He devoted most of his academic career to the study on Palmyra (now Tadmor, Syria). Between 1973 and 2009, he directed the Polish archaeological expedition to Palmyra on behalf of the Polish Centre of Mediterranean Archaeology of the University of Warsaw. One of his most important discoveries was the temple of the goddess Allat (1975). A detailed architectural analysis of the temple and a study of the marble statue of Athena found there were published by him in 2017. The expedition also uncovered the hypogea of Zabda and Alaine with tomb reliefs, the building of the principles, a complex of Christian basilicas, as well as several famous objects, including a bas-relief of a lion guarding the temple of Allat, currently on display in front of the National Museum of Damascus.

In 1998, at the invitation of the Syrian Directorate-General of Antiquities and Museums, he began rescue excavations in Hawarte (near Apamea, Hama province). The original aim of the work was to secure the paintings uncovered there, covering the walls of a cave located under the floor of a 5th-century church. Professor Gawlikowski identified the cave as a mithraeum, i.e. a sanctuary of the Persian god of Mithras. He began a long-term archaeological and conservation project on behalf of the PCMA UW, which was completed in 2010.

Between 2014 and 2019, he directed the Saudi-Polish Archaeological Expedition, which investigated a Roman trading post at the Aynuna site, identified as ancient Leuke Kome. The research was carried out in cooperation between the PCMA UW and the Saudi Commission for Tourism and National Heritage.

=== Awards ===
- 2003 Knight's Cross of the Order of Polonia Restituta
- 2016 Prof. Jan Zachwatowicz Award for his achievements in the research and conservation of heritage sites, awarded by the Polish Committee of the International Council on Monuments and Sites (ICOMOS)

== Positions and functions (selection) ==
- Since 2023, permanent member of the Académie des Inscriptions et Belles-Lettres
- Since 1966, editor-in-chief of the journal and publication series Studia Palmyreńskie
- 1990–2008, editor-in-chief of the annual Polish Archaeology in the Mediterranean
- 1991–2005 Director of the Polish Centre of Mediterranean Archaeology of the University of Warsaw
- 1993–2000 Chairman of the Scientific Council of the Institute of Archaeology of the University of Warsaw
- 1995–2000 Chairman of the Scientific Council of the Department of Mediterranean Archaeology of the Polish Academy of Sciences (currently the Institute of Mediterranean and Oriental Cultures of the Polish Academy of Sciences)
- 1989–1991 Director of the Institute of Archaeology at the University of Warsaw (currently the Faculty of Archaeology)

== Publications (selection) ==
- with Dagmara Wielgosz-Rondolino: Life in Palmyra, Life for Palmyra. Conference in Memory of Khaled al-As'ad, Warsaw, April 21st-22nd, 2016, Ancient Near Eastern Studies Supplement Series 64. (Leiden: Peeters, 2022).
- with Krzysztof Jakubiak: Scripta selecta: wybór tekstów na osiemdziesięciolecie Profesora Michała Gawlikowskiego: Palmyra and the Levant = Palmyre et Levant (1966-2010). Warszawa: Wydawnictwa Uniwersytetu Warszawskiego, 2022.
- Tadmor - Palmyra: a Caravan City between East and West. (Cracow: IRSA Publishing House, 2021).
- Le sanctuaire d'Allat à Palmyre, PAM Monograph Series 8. (University of Warsaw. Polish Centre of Mediterranean Archaeology, 2017).
- with Krystyna Gawlikowska and Przemysław Nowogórski: Palmyra. (Warszawa: Fundacja Przyjaciół Instytutu Archeologii UW: Instytut Archeologii UW, 2010).
- with Chalid Al-As'ad: The inscriptions in the Museum of Palmyra: a catalogue. (Warsaw: Oficyna Wydawnicza "Kontrast", 1997).
- with Afif Bahnassi, Marek Barański, Maria Krogulska, Aleksandra Krzyżanowska, Kazimierzem Michałowski and Michał Pietrzykowski: Sztuka Palmyry: ze zbiorów Arabskiej Republiki Syryjskiej: 50 lat polskich wykopalisk na Bliskim Wschodzie. (Warszawa: Muzeum Narodowe, 1986).
- with Zofia Sztetyłło: Zarys cywilizacji świata starożytnego. (Warszawa: Wydaw. Uniwersytetu Warszawskiego, 1986).
- with Jean Starcky: Palmyre. (Paris: Librairie d'Amérique et d'Orient, 1985).
- with Maria Krogulska: Les principia de Dioclétien "Temple des Enseignes", Palmyre: fouilles polonaises 8. (Varsovie: PWN Państ. Wydaw. Naukowe, Editions Scientifiques de Pologne, 1984).
- Sztuka Syrii. (Warszawa: Wydawnictwa Artystyczne i Filmowe, 1976).
- Recueil d'inscriptions palmyréniennes provenant de fouilles syriennes et polonaises récentes à Palmyre. (Paris: C. Klincksieck, 1974).
- Le temple palmyrénien: etude d'épigraphie et de topographie historique; sour la dir. de Kazimierz Michałowski; phot. Waldemar Jerke, Palmyre: fouilles polonaises 6. (Warszawa: Éditions Scientifiques de Pologne: Université de Varsovie. Centre d'Archéologie Méditerranéenne dans la République Arabe d'Egypte au Caire, 1973).
- Monuments funéraires de Palmyre. (Warszawa: Éditions Scientifiques de Pologne, 1970).
