= Tienen Mithraeum =

3rd c. Mithraic temple near Tienen, Belgium

The Tienen Mithraeum is a Mithraic temple constructed in the Belgian municipality of Tienen in the third century CE.

== History ==
The rise of the Cult of Mithras was the temple's most active time in the Roman Empire during the 1st century. The ruins were not discovered until 1998 through excavation of the site labeled, Grijpenveld. It now one of a total of four mithraea found in Belgium alone. Through excavation, the ruins help determine the building's original form. The remains found in the ritual pits were believed to be parts of the religious practices of the cult because of their close proximity to the mithraeum in comparison to the remainder of the excavation.

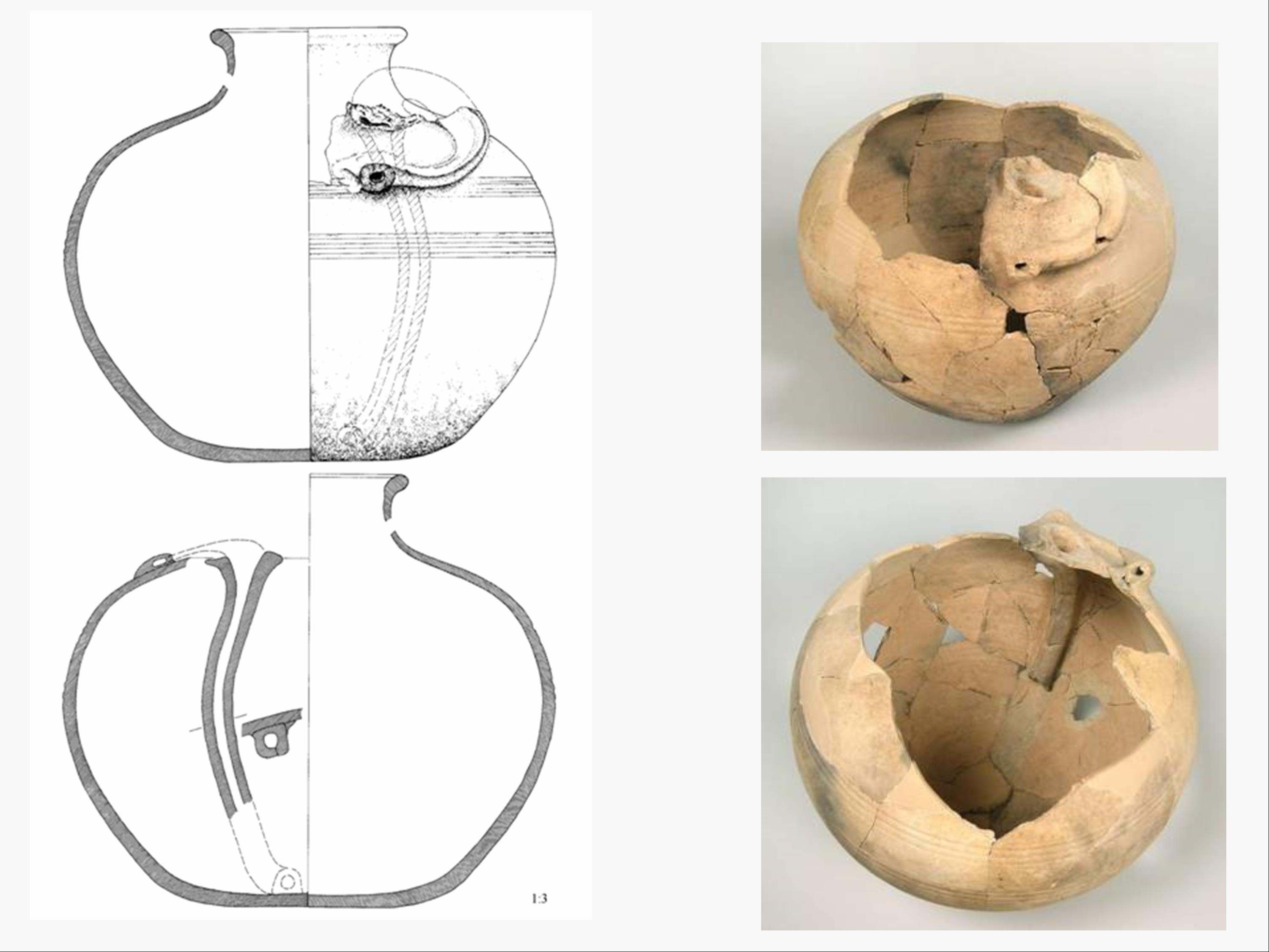
Reconstruction drawing and photos of fragments of snake vessel (Tienen mithraeum)

== Site ==
The Mithraic temple is located in the southwestern region of Tienen, on the edge of the town's border. Beside the mithraeum is a pebble road that leads to the center of Tienen as well as a discovered tumulus, built a century before the temple. Along the same path, a bronze plaque declaring the cult's devotion to Mithras was found.

== Design ==
When entering the wooden frame of the temple, an aisle of cella, or an enclosed hall, appears with lined side benches known as podia. From the entrance a 12-metre-long (39 ft) x two-metre-wide (6.6 ft) central path is found. At its end was a niche, which can be described as the mithraeum's central focus. Inside the building, the floor contained a 2 by 2 metres (6 ft 7 in × 6 ft 7 in) relief of the infamous scene of bull-killing, distinct to the god of Mithras. The arrangement of Greek-styled podia, or platforms, inside the temple was appropriate for large crowds gathered for sacred feasts. Dug below one of the side benches was a ravine originally built with a wooden lining, designed to hold water. A second ravine was discovered, but its location was perpendicular to the alternative channel. The complex was surrounded by a wooden fence, or palisade, defining the property lines of the mithraeum.

== Archaeological remains ==
Ritual sites near the mithraeum, were found to contain nearly 14,000 animal remains. The few that could be fully reassembled were: 1 Spanish mackerel, 1 hare, 1 jackdaw, 2 eels, 10 piglets, 14 lambs, and 285 chickens. During the 1st and 2nd century, Spanish mackerel was a rare food found commonly in Roman sites due to its popularity. The reconstructed jackdaw relates to the usage of black birds in religious temples, which is specific to the religion of mithraism. A majority of these animals were pigs, sheep and chickens, killed in a juvenile state, while the other birds were killed as adults. Their ages are clues to Mithraic culture. Since animal sacrifices, especially as adolescents, are historically common in a variety of religions, this separates the sacrificial animals from other uses, such as food.

Discoveries include Rhineland oil lamps, black-slipped beakers from Trier, terra cotta statues and a bronze lamp depicting Silenus. One of the more obvious cultic wares discovered was an incense burner commonly used during religious ceremonies within the mithraeum.

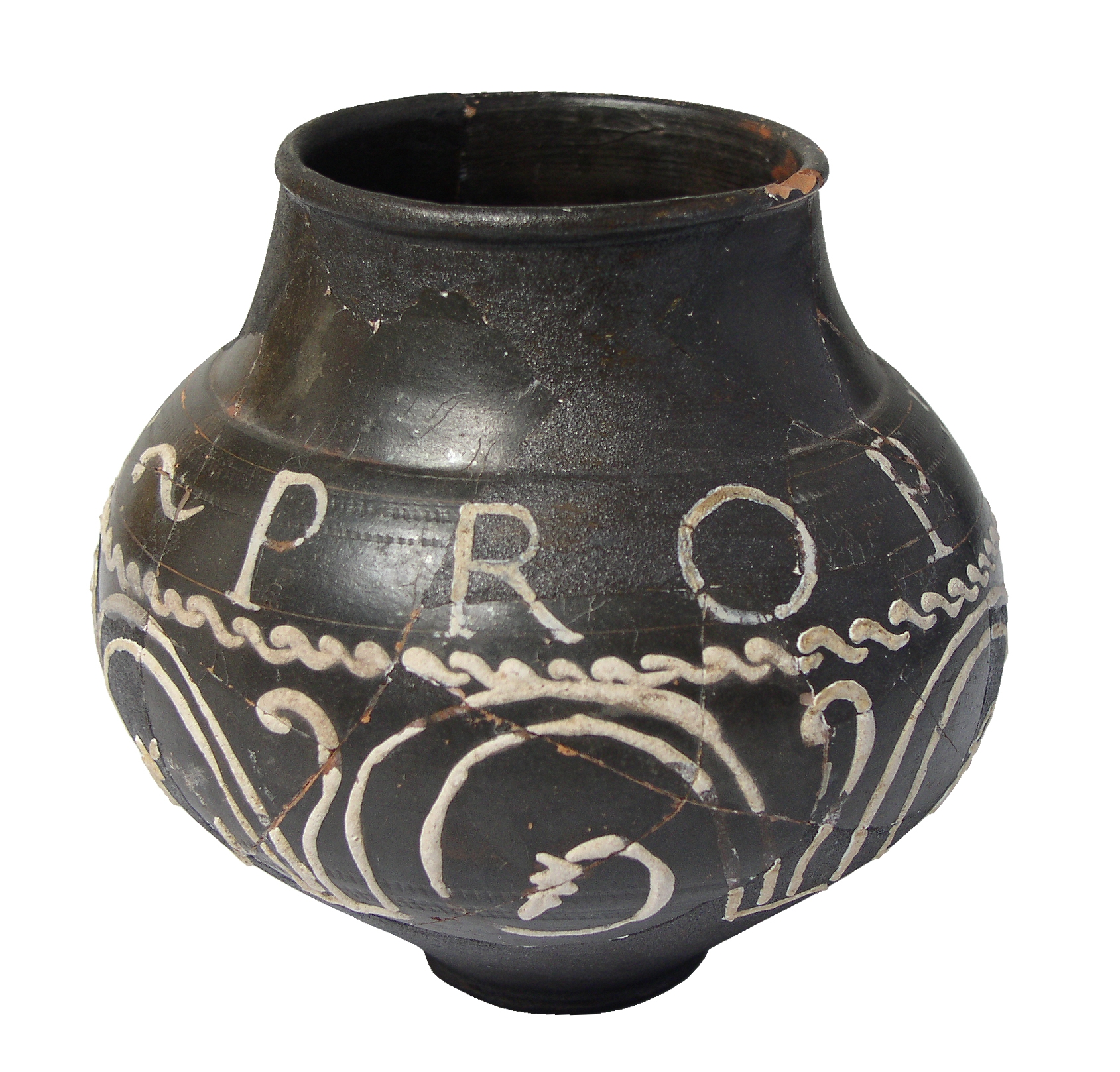
Beaker produced in Trier with decoration and the Latin motto: propino tibi, "I drink to you" (Tienen mithraeum)

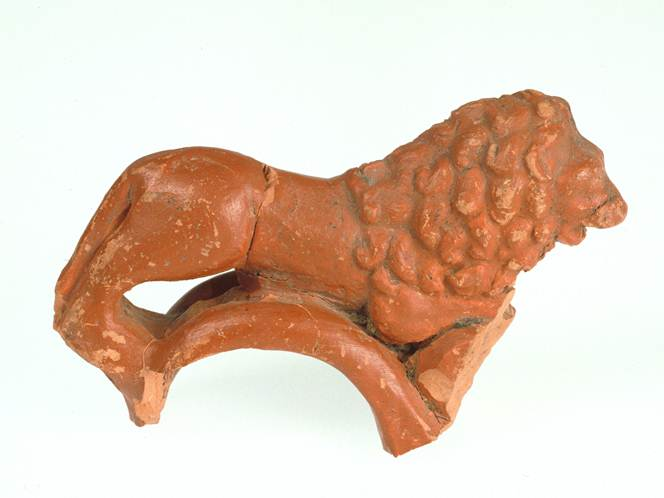
Handle with lion of the krater from Rheinzabern with lion and snake in samian ware (Tienen mithraeum)

This can be seen from the remnants of its fuel on the temple's floor tiles. In comparison to the vessels found in ordinary cemeteries, the vessels used by the Mithraic cult had enlarged proportions for their religious practices. In one of the sacred places of the Tienen Mithraeum, a burial site that contained a dagger, courseware and animal bones was excavated after the platform above it collapsed.

The discovery of the building remains is evidence of the religion's growth from urban territories to more rural areas.
