= Fertőrákos mithraeum =

Fertőrákos Mithraeum
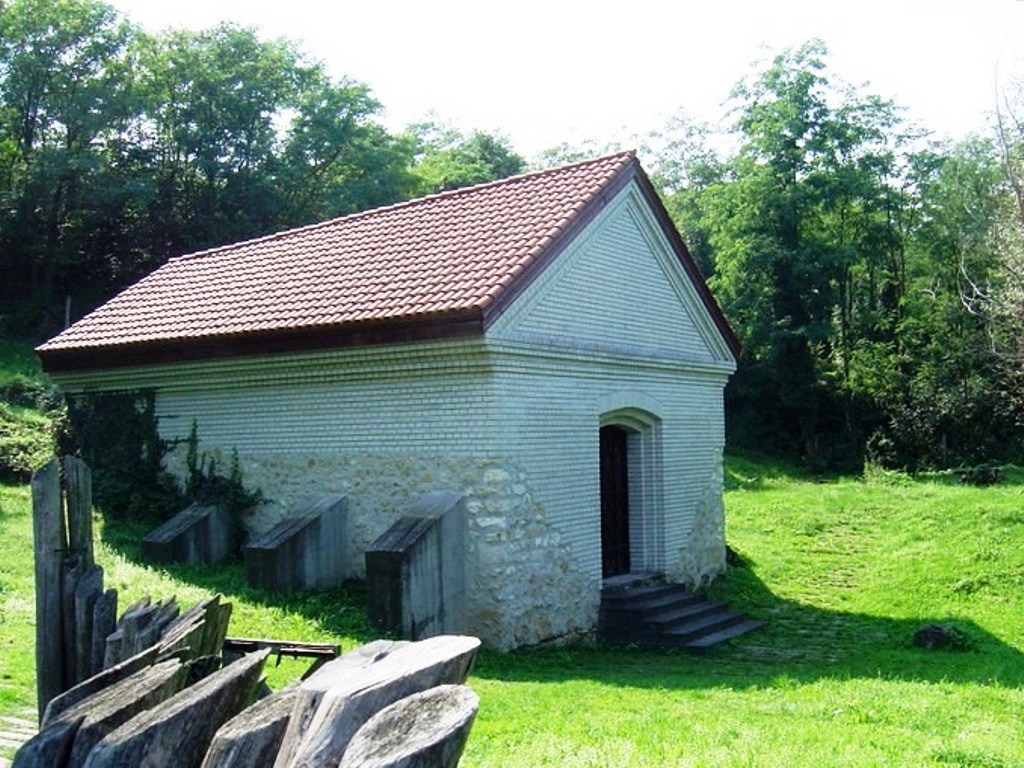
- The Mitraeum at Fertőrákos

- Location within Hungary
- Alternative names: Mithras grotto

General information
- Type: museum
- Architectural style: ancient Roman
- Location: Fertőrákos, Hungary
- Coordinates: 47.74142°N 16.65674°E
- Elevation: 154 m (505 ft)
- Completed: 3rd century
- Renovated: 1992

Height
- Height: 6 metres (20 ft)

Technical details
- Floor area: 143 square metres (1,540 sq ft)

Other information
- Seating type: trapeze

The Fertőrákos Mithraeum is a temple to the Roman god Mithras at Fertőrákos in Hungary. The temple (known as a mithraeum), follows a typical plan of a narthex followed by the shrine proper that consists of a sunken central nave with podium benches on either side.

== Discovery ==
It was discovered by chance by a stonemason called György Malleschitz in 1866 who undertook the initial clearance of the site. It attracted a great deal of interest from local scholars and a restoration of the stone vault of the shrine was funded by a local magistrate (the first attempt at reconstruction at any archaeological site in Hungary). This roof, however, was later demolished and the present cover building erected in the 1990s following the excavations of 1990–1991. The mithraeum is currently open to the public.

== The mithraeum ==
Two altars refer to people from Carnuntum and they seem to have been the impetus behind the construction of the temple. Its construction can roughly be dated to the beginning of the 3rd century AD. Trapezoidal in shape as the north end is wider than the south (5.50 m wide compared to 3.65 m), the shrine is 5.50 m long. It is orientated north to south, with the southern and eastern sides of the shrine both hollowed out of the natural rock and the northern and western sides being built in stone. Four steps lead down into the central aisle (nave) of the shrine which was 80 cm below the level of the pronaos and the two flanking side benches which were all on ground level. The tauroctony sculpture was carved into the rock face. Three altars (see below) were also found on the site. Two were dedicated by Septimius Justianus, a custodes armorum (a soldier in charge of the armoury) of Legio XIIII Gemina. The second was dedicated by Julius Saturninus, a politician from the colony.

== The altars ==
The following altars were discovered:

- D(eo) S(oli) I(invicto) M(ithrae) / L(ucius) AVIT(us) MA/TURUS D(e)C(urio) / COL(oniae) KARN(unti) / V(otum) S(olvit) L(ibens) M(erito).

To the god the Invincible Sun Mithras. Lucius Avitus Maturus, decurion of the colony of Carnuntum, willingly deservedly happily fulfilled his vow.

- S(oli) I(nvicto) M(ithrae) / SEP(timius) I(u)ST(ini)ANUS A(rmorum) [CUSTOS] / L(egionis) XIIII G(eminae) ANT(oninianae) / V(otum) S(olvit) L(ibens) M(erito).

To the Invincible Sun Mithras. Septimius Iustinianus, armorum custos of the 14th legion Gemina Antoninianae, willingly and deservedly fulfilled the vow.

The finds are housed in the museum at Sopron.

== See also ==
- Aquincum Mithraeum (of Victorinus): Mithraeum near Budapest
- Savaria Mithraeum: Mithraeum in Savaria, Hungary
