= Aquincum Mithraeum (of Victorinus) =

Mithraeum in Budapest, Hungary

Coordinates: 47.563798°N 19.050239°E

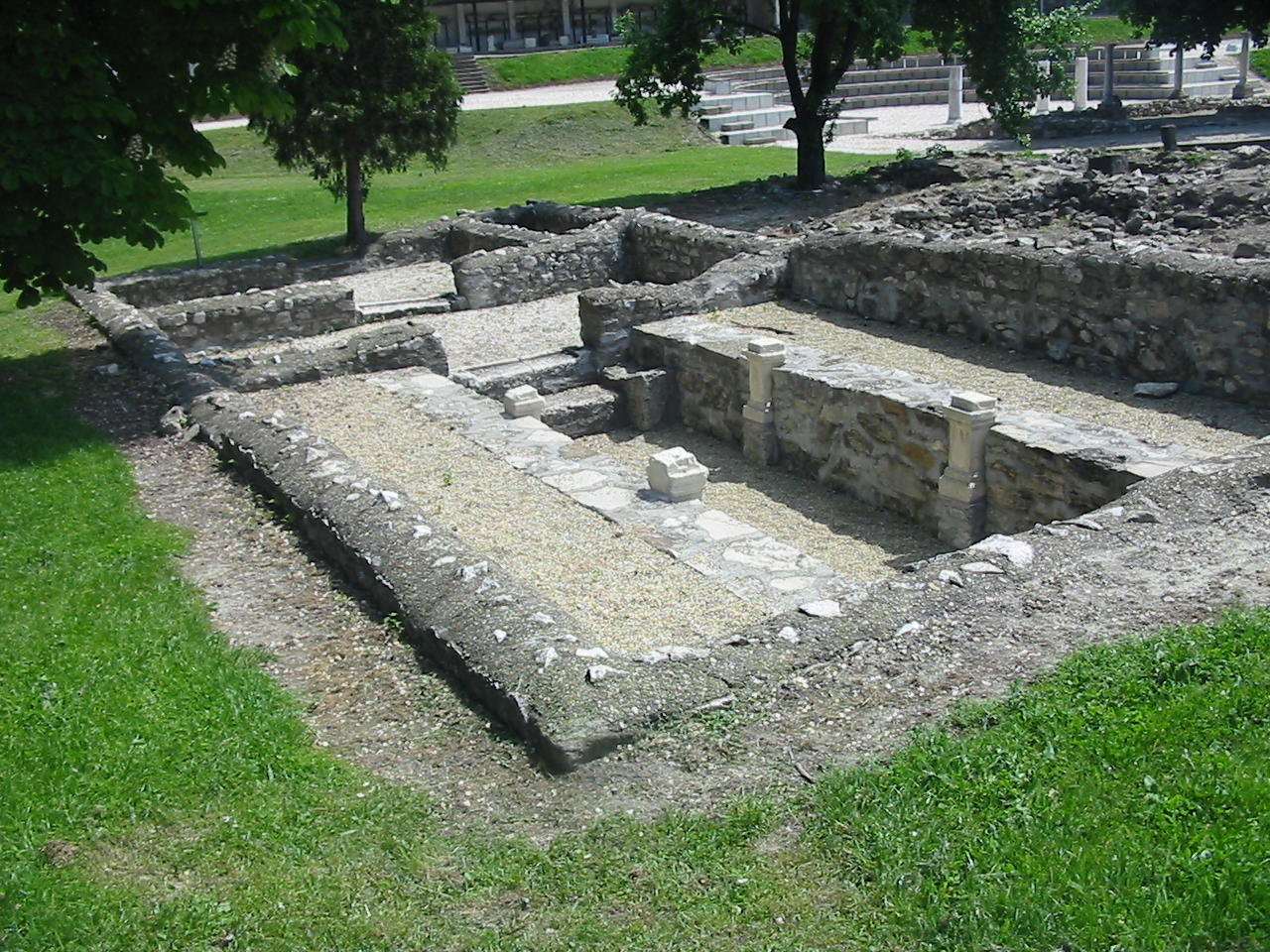
The Mithraeum from the south

The Aquincum Mithraeum (of Victorinus) is a temple to the Roman god Mithras in Budapest, Hungary. The temple (known as a Mithraeum) was built within a townhouse in the Roman city of Aquincum, now in Óbuda on the outskirts of the modern city of Budapest, Hungary.

== The Mithraeum ==
The temple was discovered during excavations in 1888 within what appeared to be a large house near to the centre of the Roman city. Due to the size of the house and the importance of its location it must have belonged to an important individual and this must certainly be the decurion Marcus Antonius Victorinus, who dedicated a number of small altars within the sanctuary. The shrine was orientated north to south and measured 7m wide by 15.03m long. The interior was divided up into three parts, two ante rooms and the sanctuary proper. The front room (Room A: 4.75 x 2.90m) is postulated by the excavators as a Shrine of Mercury. A room (Room B: 0.85x2.90m) was located on the west side and is of uncertain purpose. The middle room (Room C: 5.90x3m) probably served as a narthex. The main part of the shrine was divided into three lateral parts, typical of all Mithraea. A central nave about 2.18m wide and 1 meter below ground level was flanked on either side by podium benches for the initiates to recline on during the ceremonies (see Mithraic worship). Steps lead down to the lower floor level of the nave directly from the entrance and the higher benches were accessed by single steps on either side of the bottom nave step. Along the front of the benches, and slightly recessed into them, were placed a pair of small altars (H 0.65 Br. 0.30m) all dedicated by Marcus Antoninus Victorinus.

== Sculptural and epigraphic evidence. ==
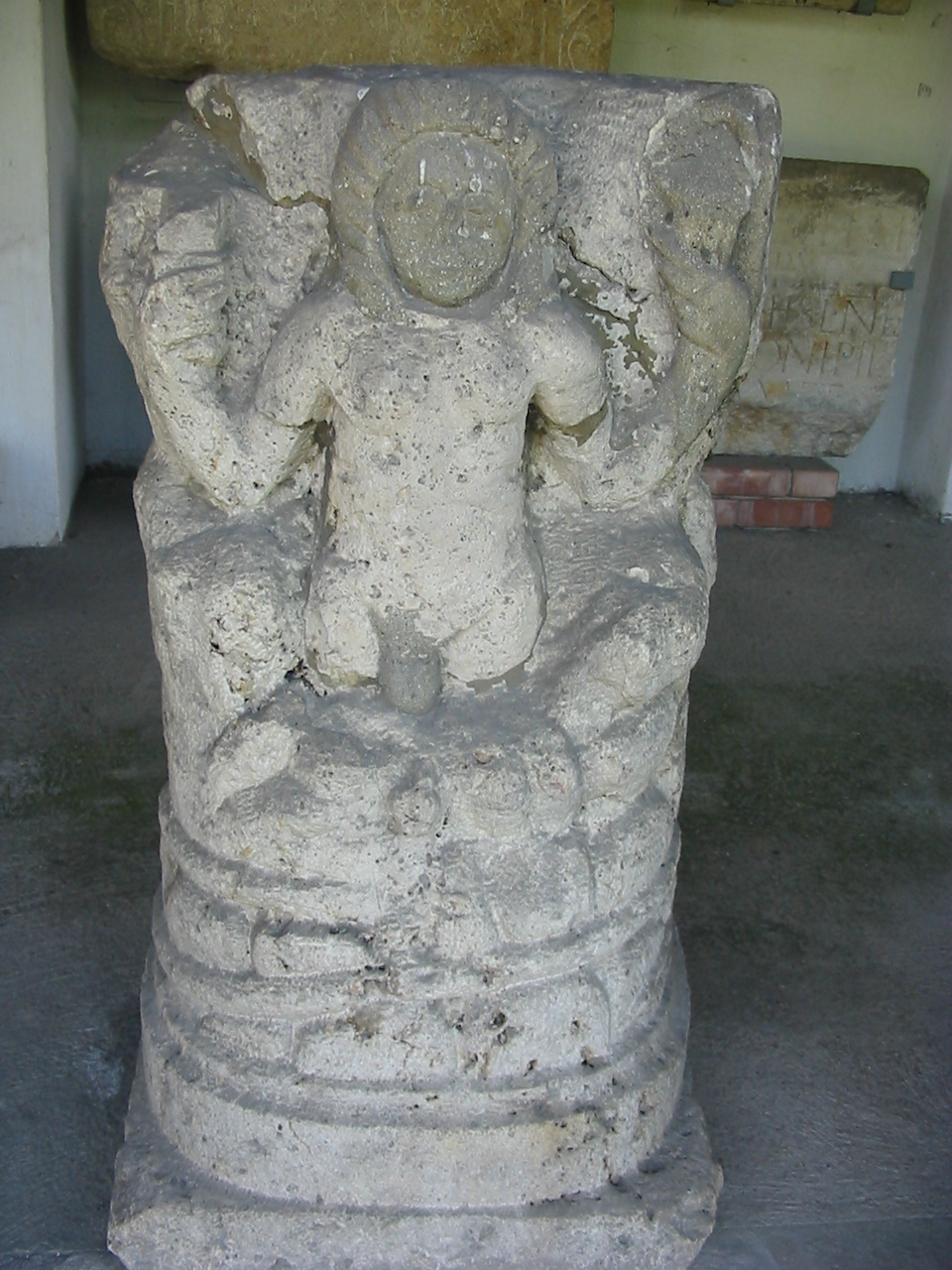

- Limestone relief (H 0.98. Br 0.55m) depicting Mithras' rockbirth. Mithras, naked and emerging from the rock to mid-thigh, holds a burning torch in his upraised left hand and a dagger in his right. The rock is encircled by a serpent who raises its head towards the god.
- DEO CAUTI / M ANT(onius) VIC/TORINUS / DEC(urio) COL(oniae) / AQ(uninci) AEDILIS.

To Cautes (see Cautes and Cautopates). Marcus Antonius Victorinus, Decurion of the colony of Aquincum. Aedile.

- As above though to DEO CAU/TOPATI / To Cautopates... (See Cautes and Cautopates).
- FONTI / PERENNI / M ANT(onius) / VICTORI/NUS DEC(urio) / COL(oniae) AQ(uinci) / AED(ilis).

To the lasting spring. Marcus Antonius Victorinus, Decurion of the colony of Aquincum. Aedile.

- {....DE]C(urio) / COL(oniae) AQ(uinici) AED(ilis).
- A fragment of the tauroctony (the main cult image) was found in the excavations and would have stood on the large stone base at the end (south) wall of the temple cella.

== The Mithraeum today ==
The shrine is fully accessible within the Aquincum Archaeological Park, just south of the Aquincum Museum building. The remains have been heavily restored and consolidated for display. The tauroctony fragment and the altar are located in the eastern wing of the Lapidarium situated at the northern edge of the Archaeological Park. The Victorinus altars are the originals in situ.

== See also ==
- Fertorakos Mithraeum: Mithraeum in Fertőrákos, Hungary
- Savaria Mithraeum: Mithraeum in Savaria, Hungary
