= University Museum A Domus do Mitreo =

Museum in Galicia (Spain)

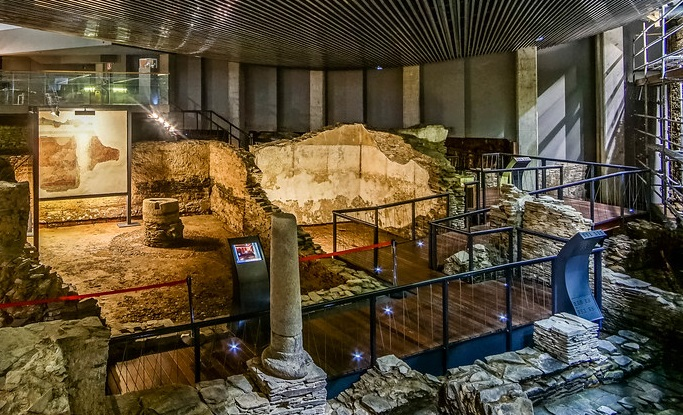

- Location within Galicia
- Established: March 22, 2018
- Location: Praza de Pío XII, 3 Lugo, Galicia (Spain), Spain
- Coordinates: 43.009472°N 7.559056°W
- Collections: Roman archeology, epigraphy, numismatics, ceramics, glass
- Directors: Jesús Varela Zapata, Mª Dolores Dopico Caínzos
- Architect: Felipe Peña
- Owner: University of Santiago de Compostela
- Website: adomusdomitreo.com

The University Museum A Domus do Mitreo (Galician: Museo Universitario A Domus do Mitreo) is a museum center built on the old site of the Pazo de Montenegro and annexed buildings, next to the Roman walls of Lugo. The Museum is called Domus do Mitreo because when archaeological surveys were carried out, prior to the construction of the new building, the remains of a domus appeared. This domus, during the Lower Roman Empire, was partially reformed to build a private building intended for use as a Mithraeum. The historical importance of the archaeological remains discovered led to revise the architectural project initially planned to preserve and incorporate them into the new building.

== Bibliography ==
- Alvar, J.; Gordon, R.; Rodríguez, C. "The Mithraeum at Lugo (Lucus Augusti) and its connection with Legio VII Gemina". Journal of Roman Archaeology (19): 266–277.
- Dopico Caínzos, Mª Dolores. Lucus Augusti: perspectivas para su investigación. Estudios Humanísticos. Historia 16. pp. 55–81.
- Rodríguez Cao, Celso (2011). A Domus do Mitreo. Servizo de Publicacións e Intercambio Científico da USC. ISBN 978-84-9887-654-3.
