= Savaria Mithraeum =

Savaria Mithraeum was the shrine of Mithras in the Roman town of Savaria which was discovered in 2008 in Szombathely, Hungary.

== History ==
The cult of Mithras was popular in the Roman province of Pannonia. Archeological evidences proved its presence in Aquincum, Fertőrákos and Sárkeszi but its popularity in Savaria, the capital of Pannonia Prima was only proved in 2008 when a mithraeum was unearthed in the vicinity of the most important surviving Roman monument of the town, the shrine of Isis.

The Savaria Mithraeum was used until the 4th century when it was burned down and collapsed. The mithraeum was discovered during the building works of a new shopping center in 2008. The remains were excavated by local archeologists who claimed that the discovery is of European importance. The ruins will be preserved in the basement of the new plaza. Many other finds were unearthed in the area like an intact Roman cellar and a 3 m wide, stone waterdrain that was repaired in the 19th century.

== Remains ==
Two stone altars were uncovered which were decorated with scenes from the life of Mithras in reliefs and had dedicative inscriptions. The inner room and the narthex of the shrine was decorated with wall paintings. The frescoes are being restored by experts from the collected fragments. Their design were geometric with some figurative scenes. The ceiling was coffered. The ancient painters used expensive pigments like Egyptian Blue and vermilion. There were stone benches along the walls in the inner room.

== See also ==
- Aquincum Mithraeum (of Victorinus): Mithraeum near Budapest
- Fertorakos Mithraeum: Mithraeu in Fertőrákos, Hungary
