= Mithraeum =

Mithraic temple in classical antiquity

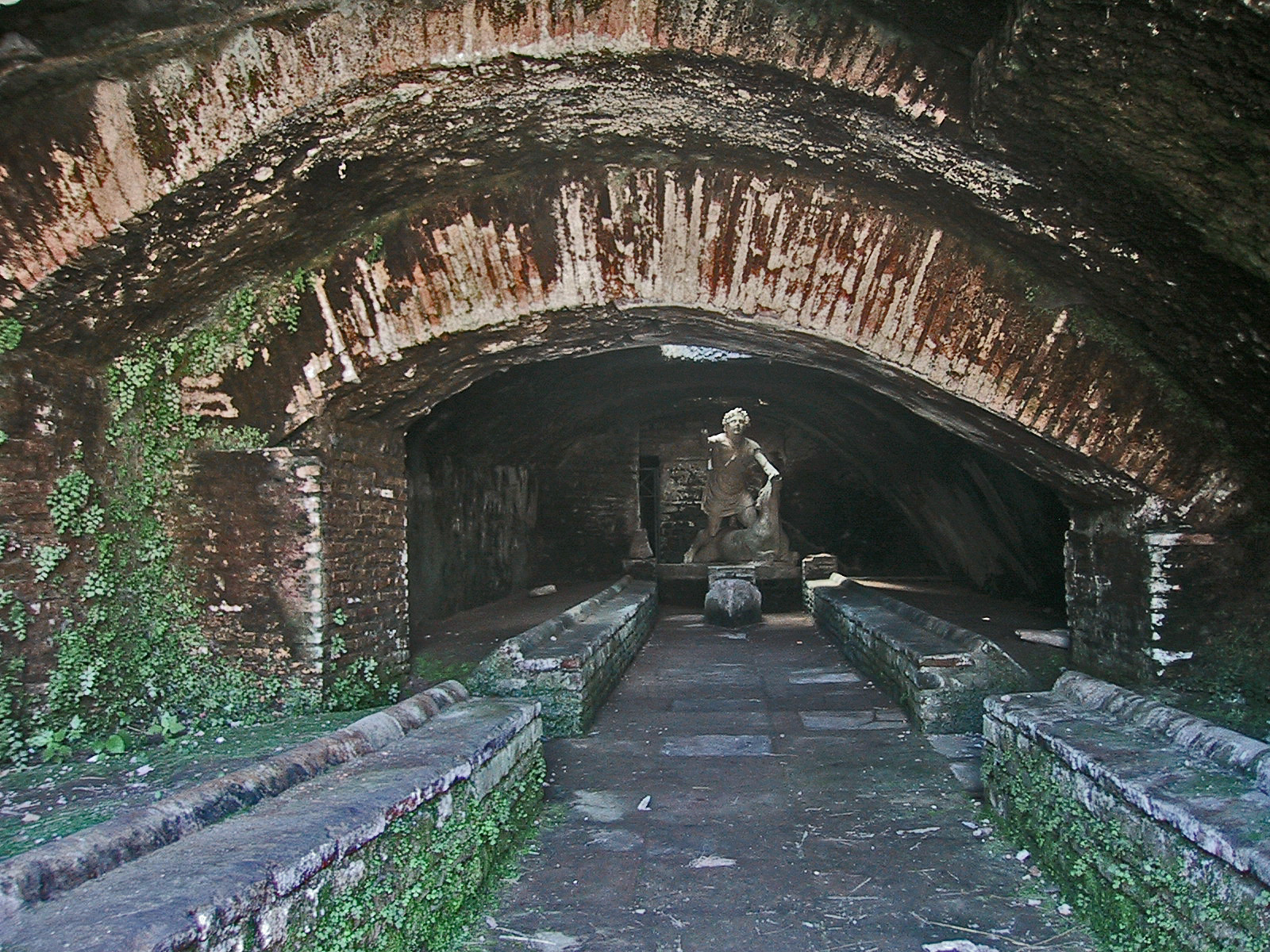
A Mithraeum found in the ruins of Ostia Antica, Italy

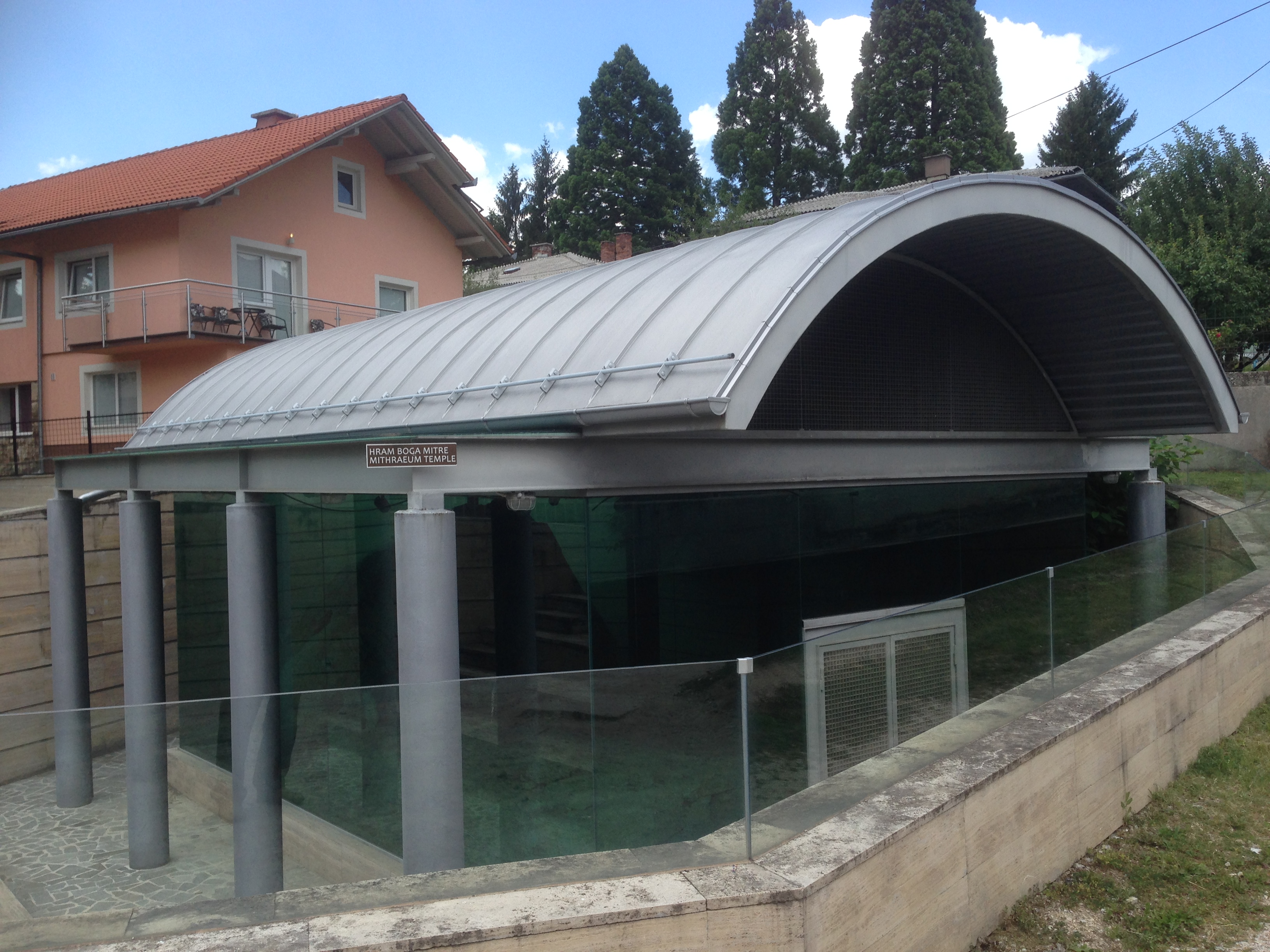
Mithraeum in Jajce, Bosnia and Herzegovina, renowned as one of the best preserved in-situ in Europe

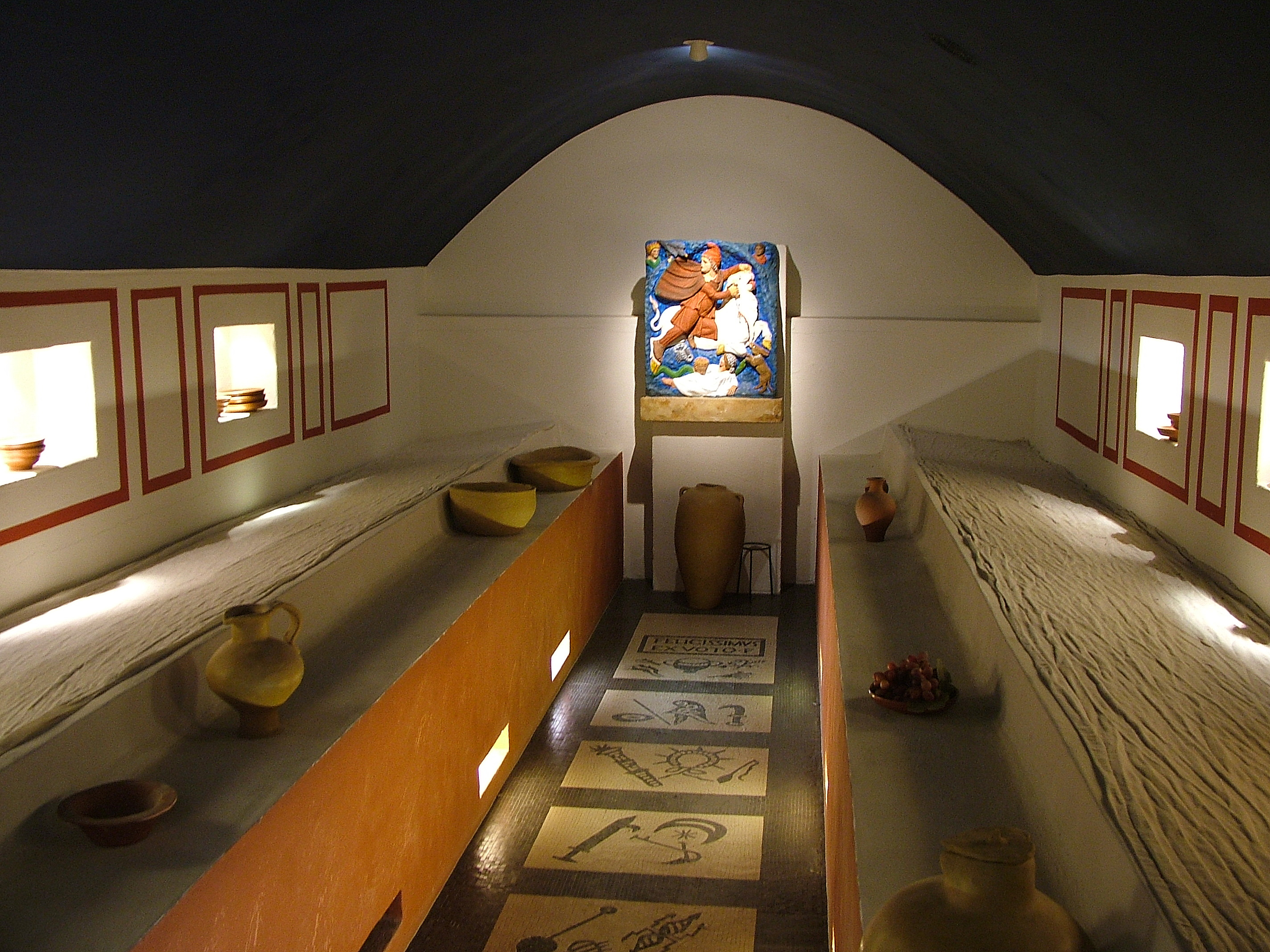
A modern reimagining of a Mithraeum at the Museum Orientalis, Netherlands

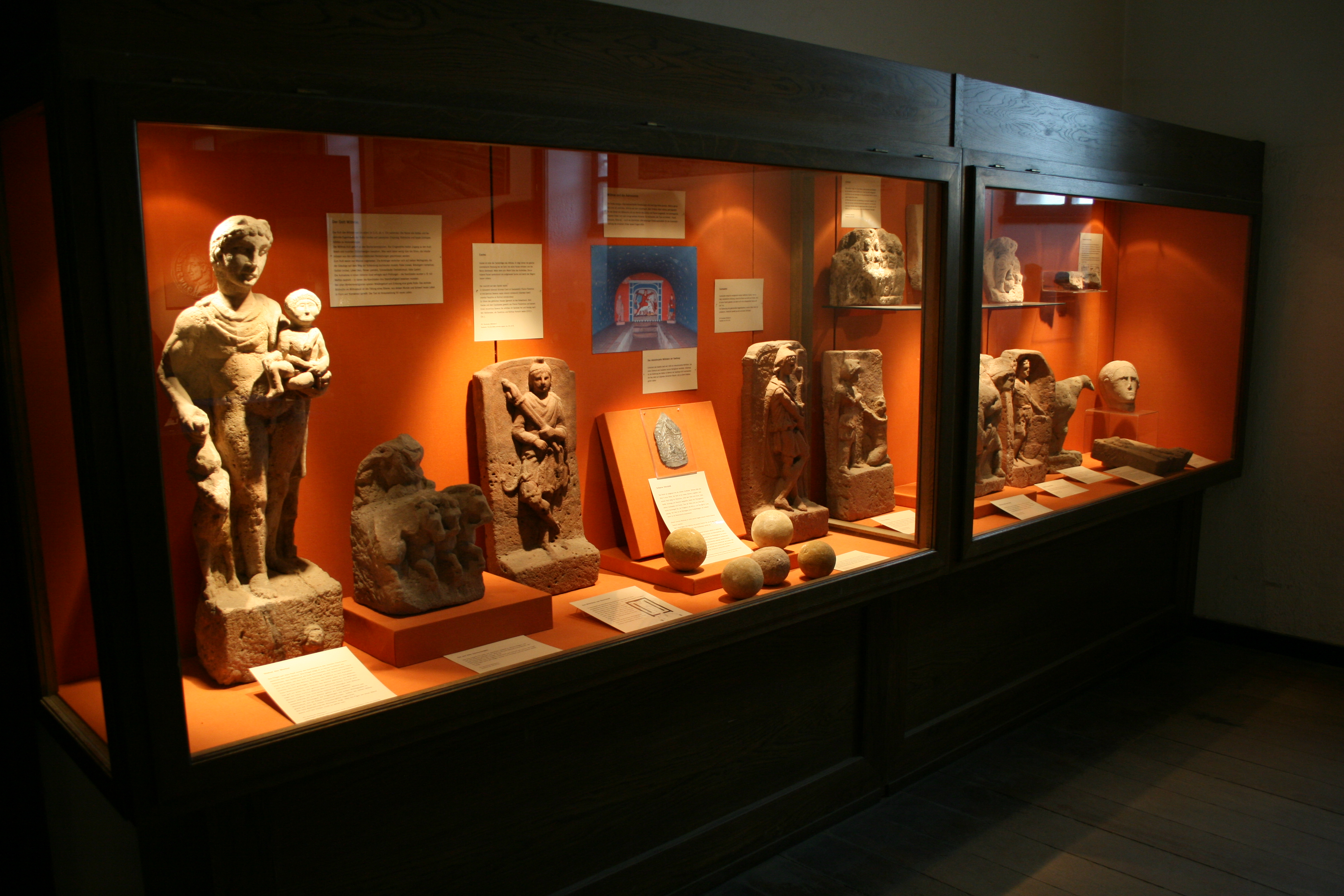
Finds from a Mithraeum in Stockstadt, Germany

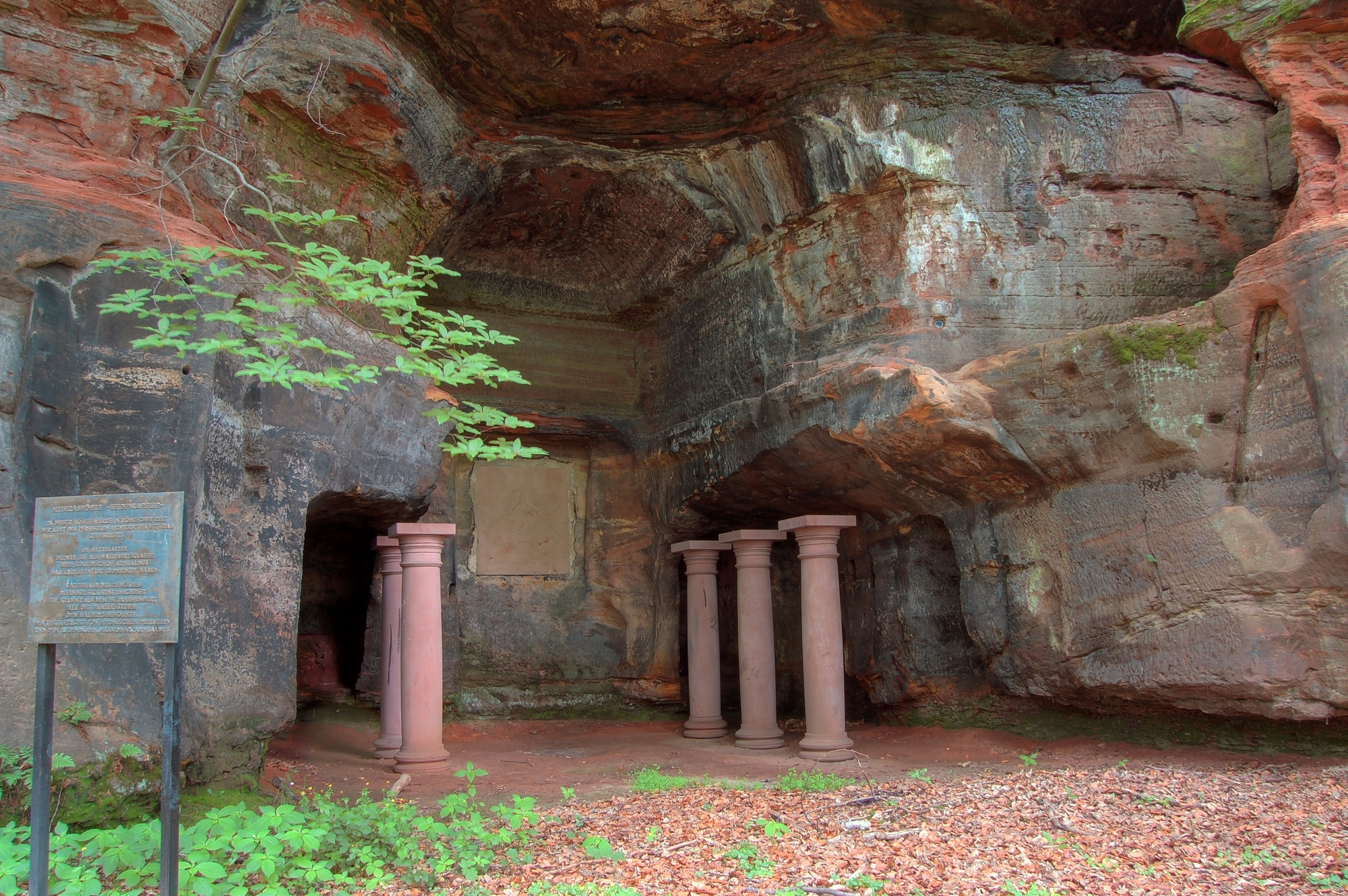
A Mithraeum found in the German city of Saarbrücken

A Mithraeum (Latin pl. Mithraea), sometimes spelled Mithreum and Mithraion (Ancient Greek: Μιθραίον), is a temple erected in classical antiquity by the worshippers of Mithras. Most Mithraea can be dated between 100 BC and 300 AD, mostly in the Roman Empire.

The Mithraeum was either an adapted natural cave, cavern, or building imitating a cave. Where possible, the Mithraeum was constructed within or below an existing building, such as the Mithraeum found beneath the Basilica of San Clemente in Rome. While most Mithraea are underground, some feature openings in the ceiling to allow light to enter, a reminder of the connection to the universe and the passage of time. The site of a Mithraeum may also be identified by its singular entrance or vestibule, which stands across from an apse at the back of which stands an altar on a pedestal, often in a recess, and its "cave", called the Spelaeum or Spelunca, with raised benches along the side walls for the ritual meal. Many mithraea that follow this basic plan are scattered over much of the Roman Empire's former territory, mainly where the legions were stationed along the frontiers (such as Britain). Others may be recognized by their characteristic layout, even though converted into crypts beneath Christian churches.

From the structure of the Mithraea, it is possible to surmise that worshippers gathered for a common meal seated on the benches lining the walls.

"Finally, the ubiquity of the Mithraeums' distinctive banqueting benches implies the ubiquity of the cult meal as the liturgie ordinaire."

The Mithraeum primarily functioned as an area for initiation, into which the soul descends and exits. The Mithraeum itself was arranged as an "image of the universe". Some researchers note that this movement, especially in the context of mithraic iconography (see below), seems to stem from the Neoplatonic concept that the "running" of the sun from solstice to solstice is a parallel for the movement of the soul through the universe, from pre-existence, into the body, and then beyond the physical body into an afterlife.

Similarly, the Persians call the place a cave where they introduce an initiate to the Mysteries, revealing to him the path by which souls descend and go back again. For Eubulus tells us that Zoroaster was the first to dedicate a natural cave in honour of Mithras, the creator and father of all... this cave bore for him the image of the cosmos which Mithras had created, and the things which the cave contained, by their proportionate arrangement, provided him with symbols of the elements and climates of the cosmos [trans. Arethusa edition]

== Notable mithraea ==
Belgium

- Tienen Mithraeum

Bosnia and Herzegovina

- Jajce Mithraeum
- Konjic Mithraeum

==== Croatia ====
- Močići (possibly open air)

Egypt

- Alexandria, Memphis, Oxyrhynchus (papyri evidence), Hermopolis, and other cities

France

- Angers
- Biesheim
- Mackwiller
- Mariana
- Sarrebourg
- Strasbourg (district of Koenigshoffen)

Germany

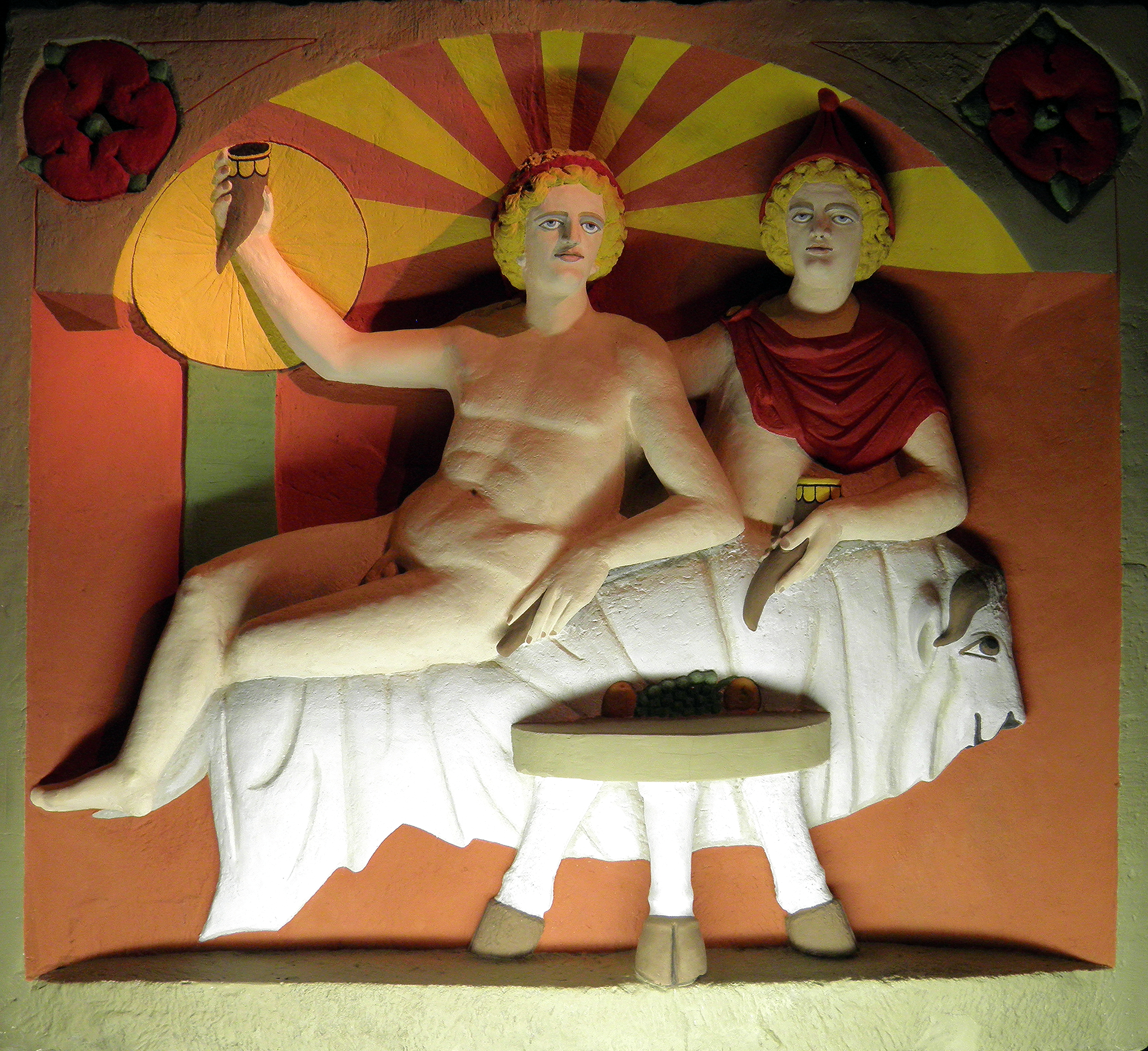
Polychrome reproduction of the Mithraic banquet scene featuring Mithras and the Sun god banqueting on the hide of the slaughtered bull, dating to 130 AD, Lobdengau-Museum, Ladenburg, Germany

- Cologne
- Dieburg/Darmstadt
- Frankfurt-Heddernheim
- Freiburg im Breisgau, mithraeum relics from Riegel displayed in Freiburg museum
- Gimmeldingen, Mithras-Heiligtum Gimmeldingen Sehenswertes (German language)
- Güglingen
- Hanau
- Heidelberg, Kurpfälzisches Museum
- Königsbrunn (near Augsburg)
- Mainz, Consecration Altars of the Mithraeum Mogontiacum
- Neuss (Legionslager Castra Novaesia)
- Osterburken
- Riegel am Kaiserstuhl (near Freiburg im Breisgau)
- Saalburg
- Saarbrücken
- Schwarzerden
- Wiesloch

Greece

- Elefsina
- Aigio
- Thermes

Hungary

- Aquincum Mithraeum (of Victorinus). Remains open within Aquincum Archaeological Park.
- Savaria Mithraeum
- Fertorakos Mithraeum

Iran

- Mithra Temple of Maragheh

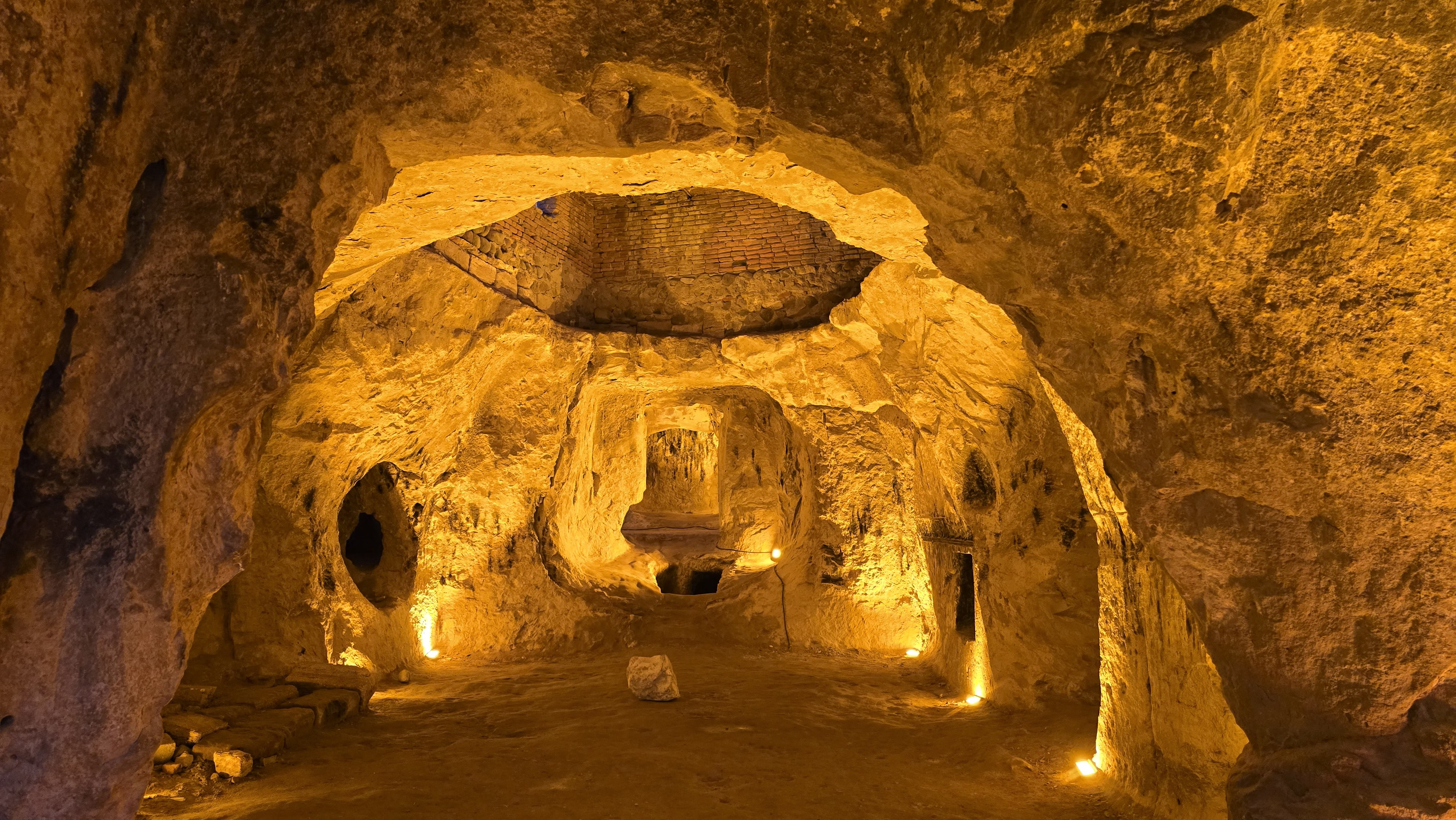
an underground rock-cut sanctuary in Iran, near Varjovi village, built during the Parthian era for the worship of Mithra.

Israel

- Caesarea Maritima
- Possibly in Jerusalem, Via Dolorosa, near the Second Station, where two vases with specific iconography were excavated

Italy

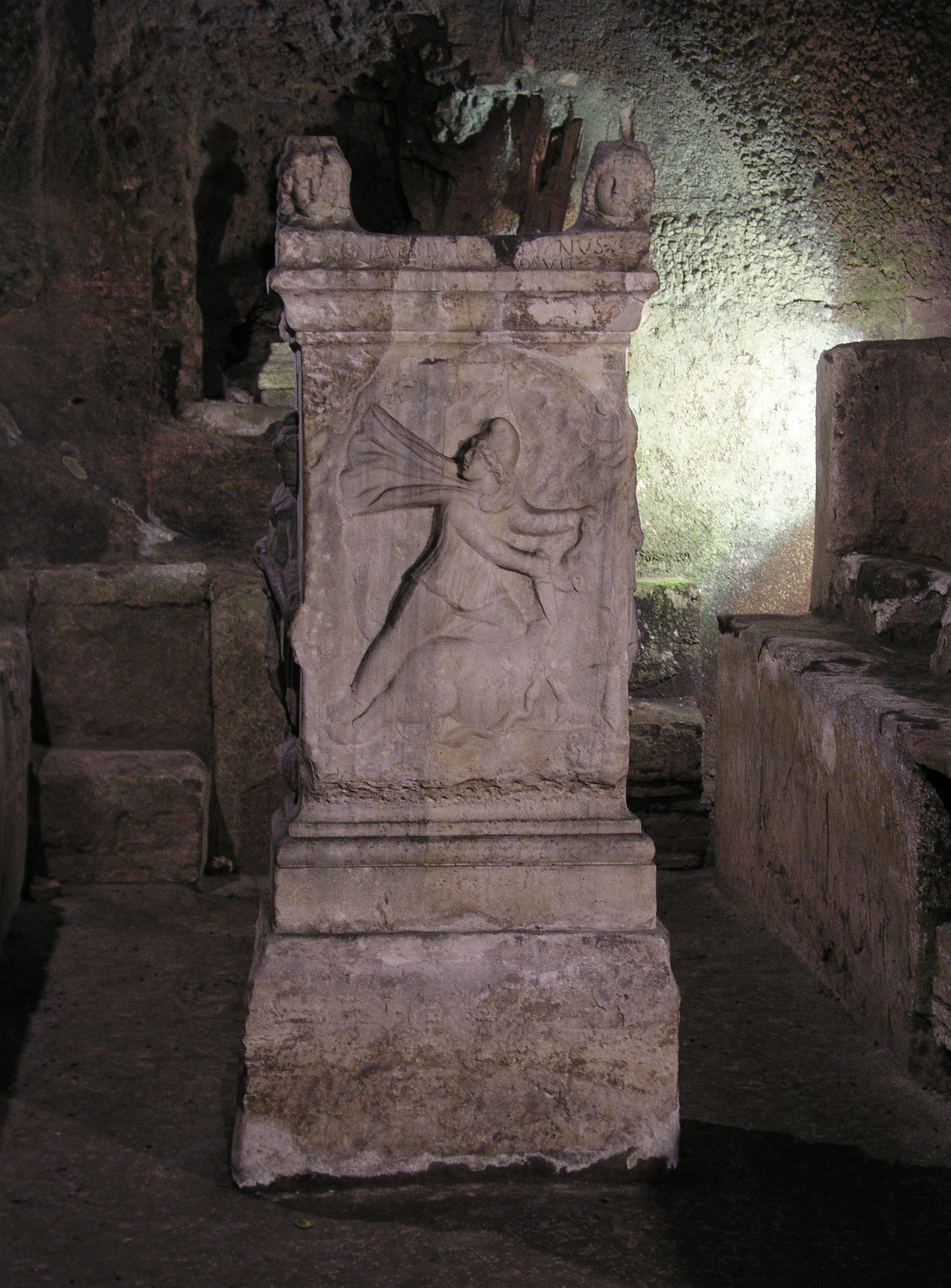
Mithraeum in the lowest floor in the Basilica of San Clemente in Rome

- In the city of Rome:
  - Mithraeum of the Circus Maximus. Remains open by appointment.
  - Barberini Mithraeum. Remains open by appointment.
  - Mithraeum of San Clemente, under the basilica of San Clemente. Remains visible in the archaeological museum.
  - Mithraeum of the Baths of Caracalla. Remains open by appointment.
  - Castra Peregrinorum mithraeum, under the church of Santo Stefano Rotondo. Remains open by appointment.
  - Mithraeum under the Santa Prisca basilica. Remains open by appointment.
  - Mithraeum of the Seven Spheres, in Ostia Antica
- In Campania:
  - Mithraeum of Santa Maria Capua Vetere
  - Mithraeum of Naples
- In Lazio:
  - Mithraeum in the crypt of the romanesque church of the Madonna del Parto, Sutri.

Lebanon

- Sidon Mithraeum

Romania

- A reconstructed Mithraeum in the Brukenthal Museum's Lapidarium, with some of the items unearthed at Apulum (Alba Iulia).
- Ulpia Traiana Sarmizegetusa.

Spain

- Mitraeum of Cabra, Andalusia.
- Mitraeum of Els Munts (Roman villa), Tarragona.
- University Museum A Domus do Mitreo (The Domus of the Mithraeum) next to the Roman walls of Lugo, in Galicia.

Switzerland

- Martigny (ancient Octodurus) - a reconstructed Mithraeum

Syria

- Mithraeum of Dura-Europos - Transported to and rebuilt at Yale University's Gallery of Fine Arts.
- Hawarte

Turkey

- Zerzevan Castle

United Kingdom

- Caernarfon Mithraeum, Wales.
- Carrawburgh, Hadrian's Wall, England. Remains open.
- London Mithraeum, England. Remains open.
- Rudchester Mithraeum, England.
