= Els Munts (Roman villa) =

Archaeological site in Spain

The villa of "Els Munts" is a residential Roman villa built during the 2nd century C.E. The villa is located 12 km away from Tarraco in the municipality of Altafulla in Spain. Scholars have regarded the villa of Els Munts as noteworthy for its mosaics and exceptional state of preservation. As a part of Tarraco, the villa of Els Munts is a UNESCO World Heritage site.

== Architecture ==
The villa of Els Munts contains several components including a bath, gardens, and temple. In total the villa had a garden, semi-basement corridor with cistern for Caius Valerius Avitus, peristyle, water cistern known locally as "La Tartana", a more extensive water reservoir, dining room (triclinium), the Mithraeum—a temple dedicated to the god Mithras, porticoed corridor. The baths had a reception with an atrium and alcover stone slab floor. There were heated rooms: caldaria, tepidaria, and furnaces with hypocaustum, and cold rooms (frigidaria). A furnace, praefurnia, heated the hot rooms from below. Lastly, there were latrines which excess water from the baths used to remove the excrement.

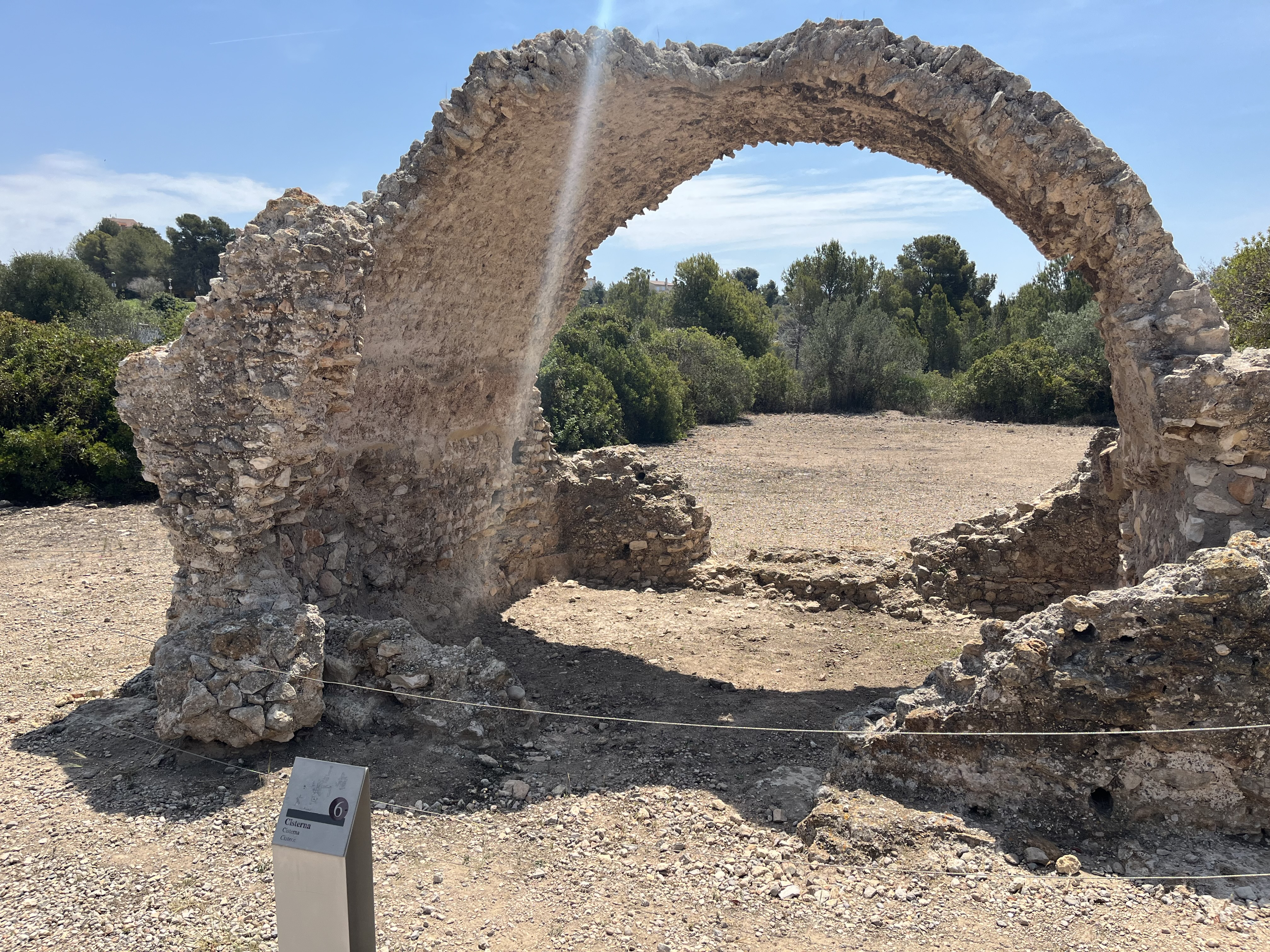
Ruins from the Roman villa of Els Munts, "La Tartana" is a water cistern with a barrel roof.

== History ==
The ancient people known as the Iberians were early inhabitants of the region. The Roman historian Livy mentions Tarraco in describing part of the origins of the Second Punic War. The villa was initially built in the 1st century CE, on top of which the remains preserved today were built in the middle of the 2nd century CE. Sometime after 175 CE but before 200 CE, a fire burned at villa of Els Munts, and the inhabitants abandoned it.

The owner of the villa was Caius Valerius Avitus, a duumvir for the Roman province of Tarraco. A wall painting at the site indicates this information.

== Location and Geography ==
The villa of Els Munts is located in the municipality of Altafulla. Approximately 12 kilometers from Tarraco, modern day Tarragona and near the mouth of the Gayá River, the villa of Els Munts sits atop the western slope of a coastal hill which is part of Cap Roig, the origin of which is the Miocene era. It overlooks the Mediterranean Ocean and is near the Via Augusta.

=== Accessibility ===
The villa of Els Munts is part of a museum open to the public.
