= Mithraeum in Hawarte =

Mithraeum in Hawarte – a sanctuary of the Persian god Mithra, discovered under the basilica of Archbishop Photios in Hawarte, Syria, near Apamea.

== Archaeological research ==
In the 1970s, archaeological work at the site of Hawarte was conducted by Maria Teresa and Pierre Canivet. They focused, among others, on the three-nave basilica of Archbishop Photios built in AD 480. The mithraeum was discovered about 20 years later when the mosaic floor in the middle of the nave collapsed. In 1998, the Syrian Directorate-General for Antiquities and Museums invited Prof. Michał Gawlikowski and his team from the Polish Centre of Mediterranean Archaeology University of Warsaw to study the mithraeum and protect the remains of wall paintings adorning the walls and ceiling of the cave. The room itself had been robbed earlier, and only fragments of decoration were preserved. Their state deteriorated further due to the atmospheric conditions to which they had been exposed since the discovery of the cave. During the excavations, which lasted until 2005, all fragments of the wall paintings were protected in situ. After that, the conservation work started. Fragments of painted plaster brought from other collections to the museum in Hama were protected in 2005 and 2006. In 2010, the project aiming to reconstruct the iconographic program of the mithraeum’s painted decoration was commenced by Dr. Dobrochna Zielińska.

== Wall paintings ==
Painted decoration in mithraea is rare and usually limited to the borders of the niche. Only a few examples are known, including one from Dura Europos. The wall paintings in the mithraeum in Hawarte are thus exceptional. They depict symbolic scenes from the myth about Mithra, and so are an important source for the studies on Mithraism.

== See also ==
- Mithraism
- Mithraeum
