= Altafulla =

- Municipality
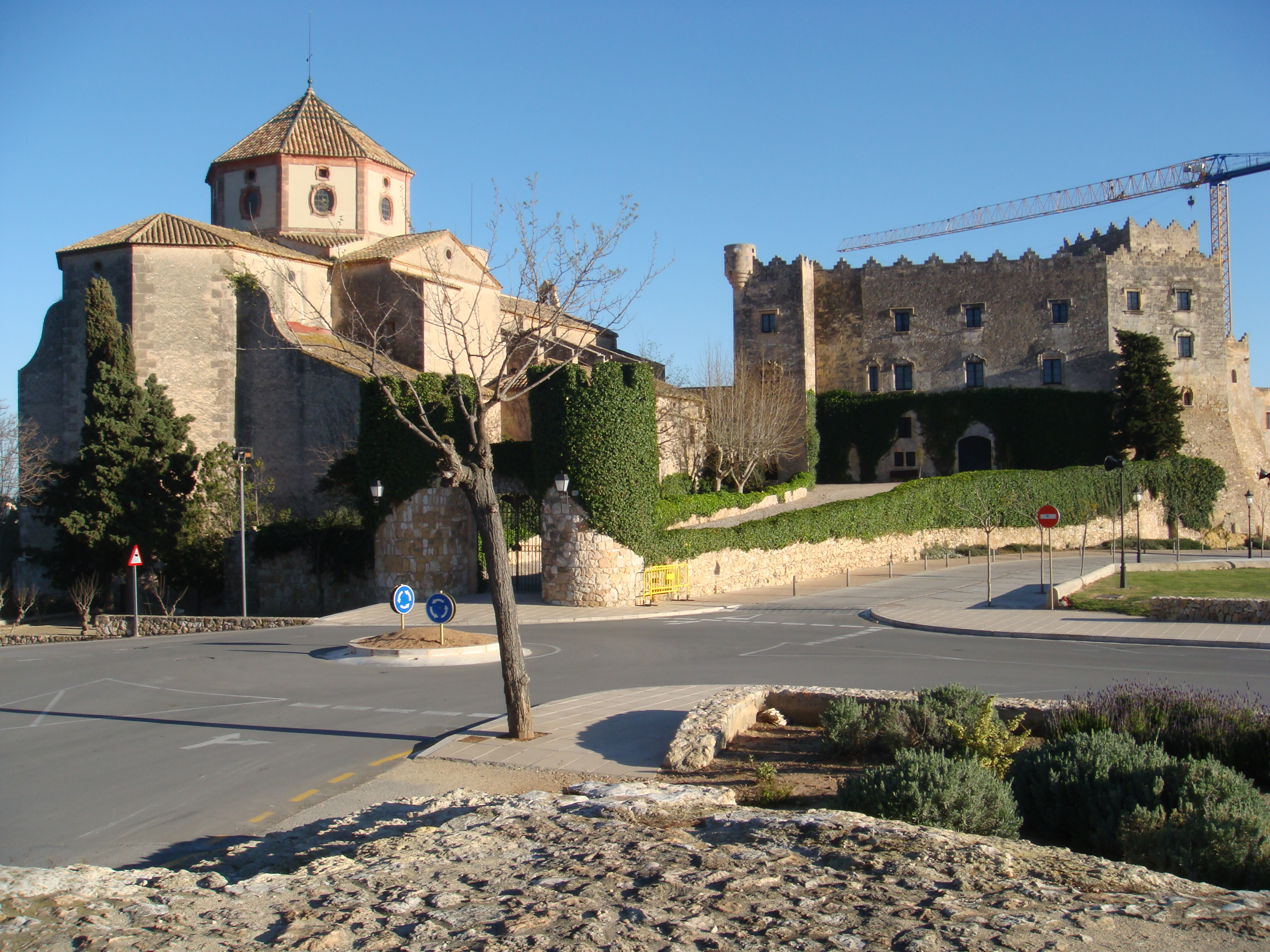

- Coat of arms

- Location in Catalonia
- Coordinates: 41°8′36″N 1°22′37″E
- Country: Spain
- Community: Catalonia
- Province: Tarragona
- Comarca: Tarragonès

Government
  - Mayor: Jordi Molinera (2023)

Area
  - Total: 7.0 km^{2} (2.7 sq mi)
- Elevation: 52 m (171 ft)

Population (2025-01-01)
  - Total: 5,870
  - Density: 840/km^{2} (2,200/sq mi)
- Demonym: Altafullenc
- Postal code: 43893
- Website: www.altafulla.cat

Altafulla (Catalan pronunciation: [əltəˈfuʎə]) is a municipality in the comarca of the Tarragonès in Catalonia, Spain. It has a population of 5,870 (register office, 2025).

The town of Altafulla has a beautifully intact old quarter crowned by the Castle of Altafulla, and an old fishing quarter dating back to the 18th century along the beach, called "Baixamar" or "Les Botigues de Mar".

An additional medieval castle on a small promontory overlooking the sea, the Castle of the Marquises of Tamarit (not open to the public) is often thought as part of Altafulla, but it is actually located in the neighbor municipality of Tarragona. Beyond the castle is one of the last remaining forests stretching along the sea in Catalonia, part of which is a small nature preserve (under the Tamarit-Punta de la Móra Special Environmental and Landscape Protection Plan).

Altafulla is also home to the remains of the Roman villa of Els Munts, which is included in a larger UNESCO World Heritage Site The Gaià River "empties" into the sea here, its last stretch being a small nature preserve and haven for songbirds (Reserva Natural de Fauna Salvatge de la Desembocadura del Gaià - Gaià River Estuary Wildlife Preserve), though due to damming upriver, it carries very little water at this last section, forming a tiny salt marsh separated from the sea by a bar of sand. This wildlife preserve is run by L'Hort de la Sínia, an ecological agriculture, learning and activities center.

Altafulla has one of the highest median household incomes in the province of Tarragona.

== Twin towns ==
- Roviano, Italy
