= Mackwiller =

Mackwiller Màckwiller
- Commune
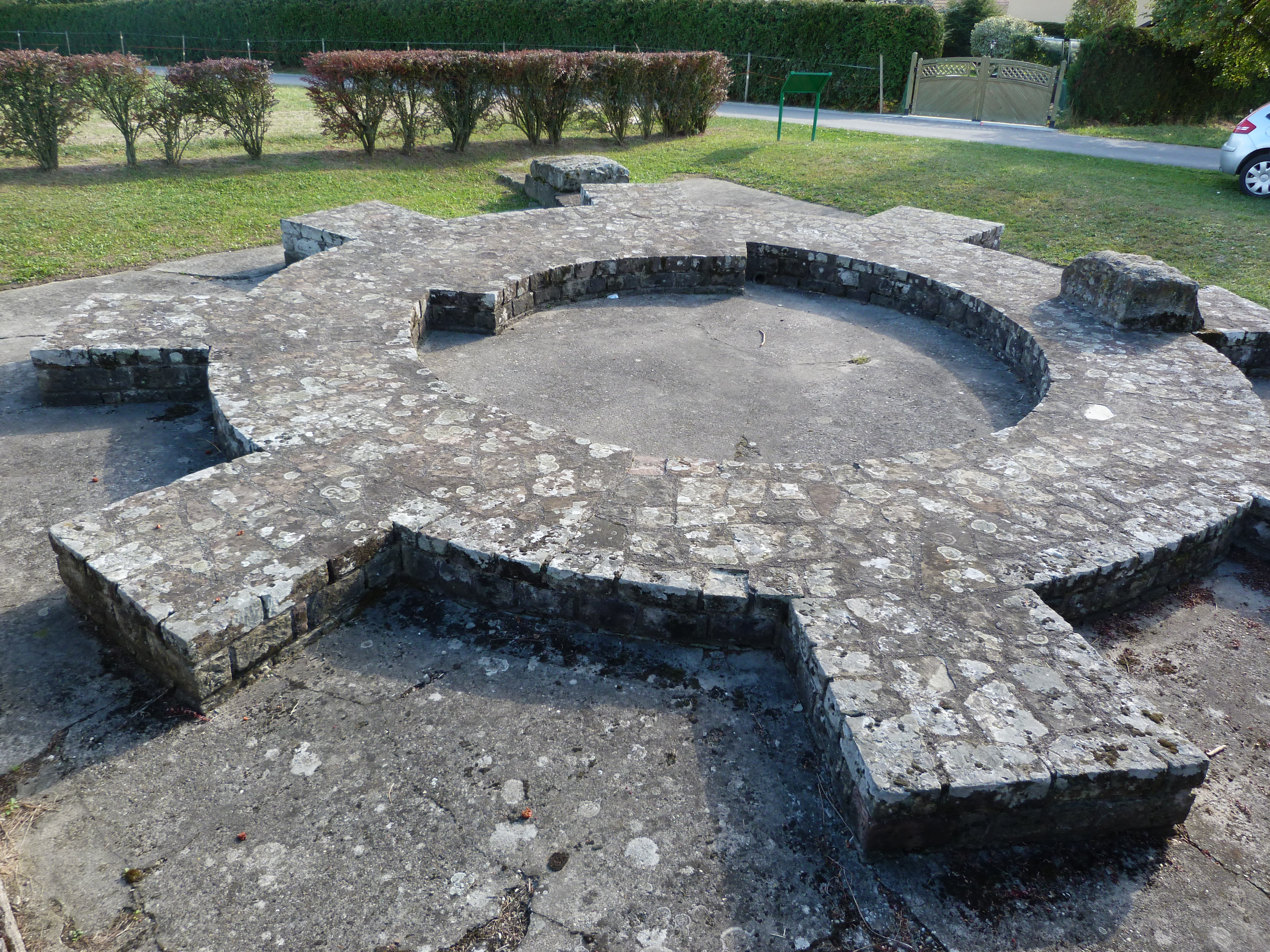
- The remains of the Roman baths in Mackwiller

- Coat of arms
- Location of Mackwiller
- Location within France Location within Grand Est
- Coordinates: 48°55′36″N 7°10′34″E
- Country: France
- Region: Grand Est
- Department: Bas-Rhin
- Arrondissement: Saverne
- Canton: Ingwiller

Government
  - Mayor (2020–2026): Emmanuel Wittmann
- Area^{1}: 9.02 km^{2} (3.48 sq mi)
- Highest elevation: 346 m (1,135 ft)
- Lowest elevation: 224 m (735 ft)
- Population (2023): 525
  - Density: 58.2/km^{2} (151/sq mi)
- Time zone: UTC+01:00 (CET)
  - Summer (DST): UTC+02:00 (CEST)
- INSEE/Postal code: 67278 /67430
- ^{1} French Land Register data, which excludes lakes, ponds, glaciers > 1 km^{2} (0.386 sq mi or 247 acres) and river estuaries.

Mackwiller (French pronunciation: [makvilɛʁ]; German: Mackweiler) is a commune in the Bas-Rhin department in Grand Est in north-eastern France.

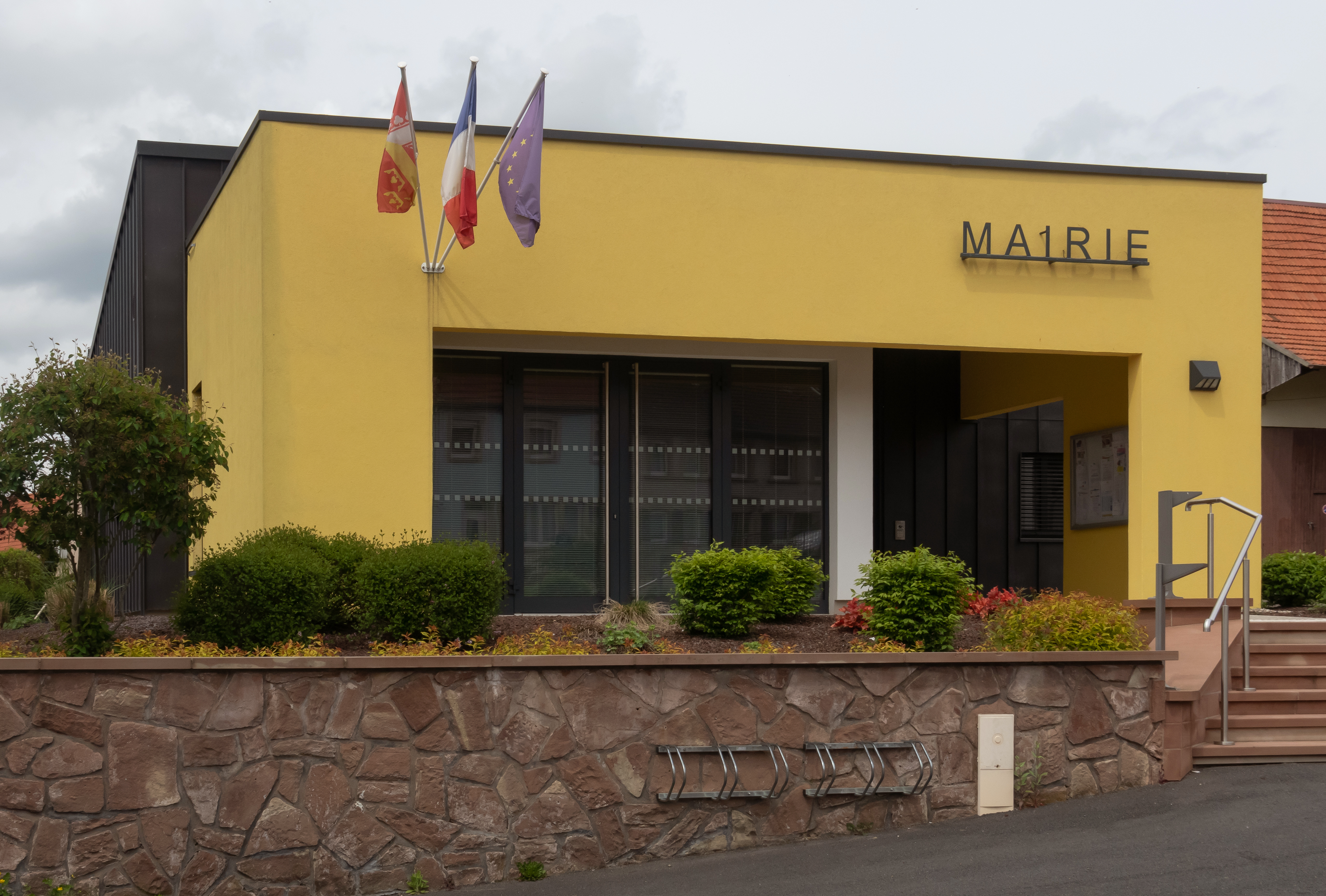
Mackwiller, townhall

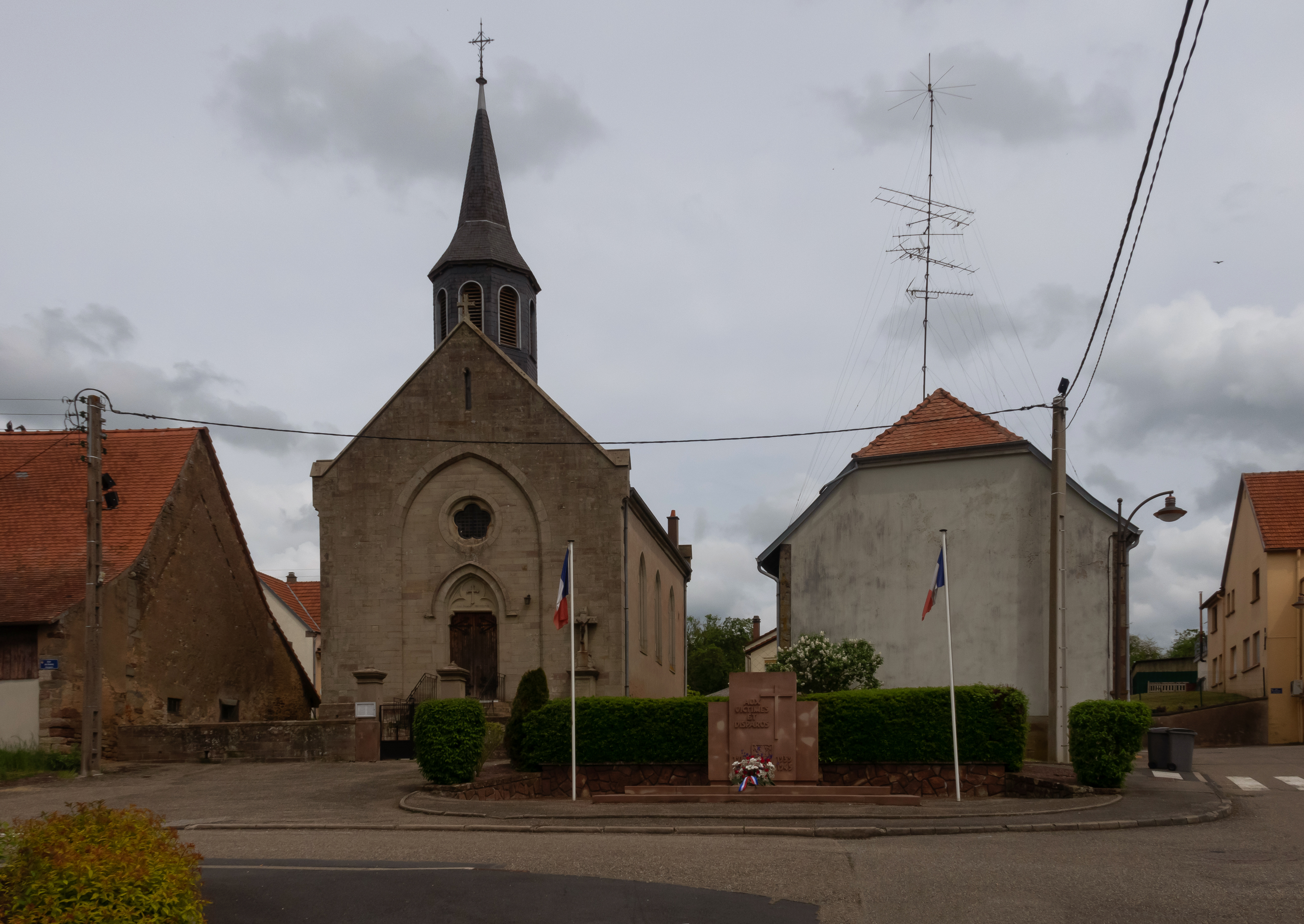
Mackwiller, church

== Archaeology ==
In 1955, substantial fragments of a large Mithraeum were unearthed in Mackwiller by Jean-Jacques Hatt, archaeologist and director of the Musée archéologique de Strasbourg. The find is still prominently displayed in that museum.

== See also ==
- Communes of the Bas-Rhin department
