= Ancient Roman architecture =

- The Colosseum in Rome (c. 70–80)

Additional media
- Years active: 509 BC (establishment of the Roman Republic) – 4th century AD
- Location: Ancient Rome
- Influences: Ancient Greek; Ancient Egyptian
- Influenced: Neoclassical; New Classical

Ancient Roman architecture adopted the external language of classical ancient Greek architecture for the purposes of the ancient Romans, but was different from Greek buildings, becoming a new architectural style. The two styles are often considered one body of classical architecture. Roman architecture flourished in the Roman Republic and to an even greater extent under the Empire, when the great majority of surviving buildings were constructed. It used new materials, particularly Roman concrete, and newer technologies such as the arch and the dome to make buildings that were typically strong and well engineered. Large numbers remain in some form across the former empire, sometimes complete and still in use today.

Roman architecture covers the period from the establishment of the Roman Republic in 509 BC to about the 4th century AD, after which it becomes reclassified as Late Antique or Byzantine architecture. Few substantial examples survive from before about 100 BC, and most of the major survivals are from the later empire, after about 100 AD. Roman architectural style continued to influence building in the former empire for many centuries, and the style used in Western Europe beginning about 1000 is called Romanesque architecture to reflect this dependence on basic Roman forms.

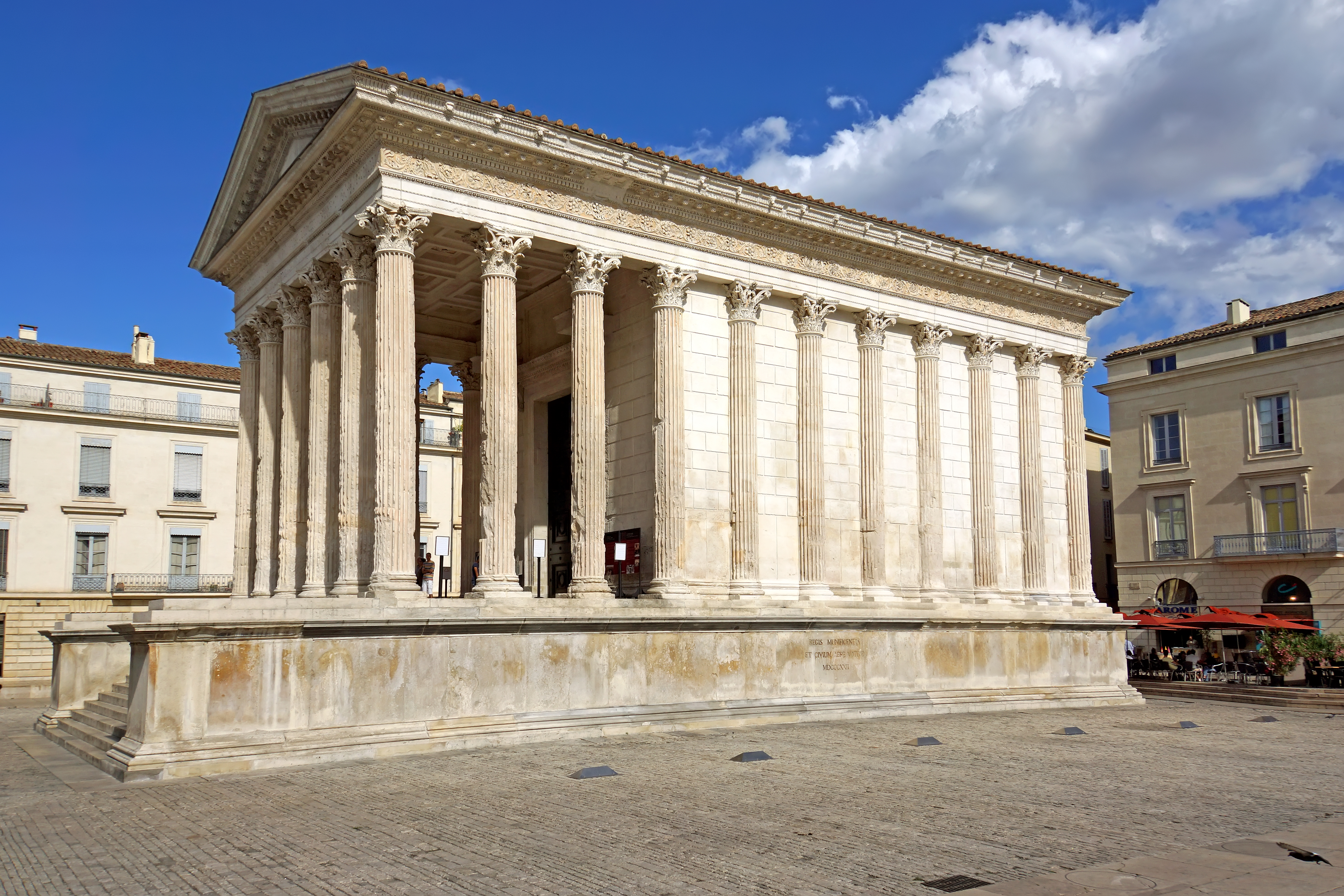
The Maison carrée in Nîmes (France), one of the best-preserved Roman temples, c. 2 AD

The Romans only began to achieve significant originality in architecture around the beginning of the Imperial period, after they had combined aspects of their originally Etruscan architecture with others taken from Greece, including most elements of the style we now call classical architecture. They moved from trabeated construction mostly based on columns and lintels to one based on massive walls, punctuated by arches, and later domes, both of which greatly developed under the Romans. The classical orders now became largely decorative rather than structural, except in colonnades. Stylistic developments included the Tuscan and Composite orders; the first being a shortened, simplified variant on the Doric order and the Composite being a tall order with the floral decoration of the Corinthian and the scrolls of the Ionic. The period from roughly 40 BC to about 230 AD saw most of the greatest achievements, before the Crisis of the Third Century and later troubles reduced the wealth and organizing power of the central governments.

The Romans produced massive public buildings and works of civil engineering, and were responsible for significant developments in housing and public hygiene, for example their public and private baths and latrines, under-floor heating in the form of the hypocaust, mica glazing (examples in Ostia Antica), and piped hot and cold water (examples in Pompeii and Ostia).

== Overview ==
Despite the technical developments of the Romans, which took their buildings far away from the basic Greek conception where columns were needed to support heavy beams and roofs, they were reluctant to abandon the classical orders in formal public buildings, even though these had become essentially decorative. However, they did not feel entirely restricted by Greek aesthetic concerns and treated the orders with considerable freedom.

Innovation started in the 3rd or 2nd century BC with the development of Roman concrete as a readily available adjunct to, or substitute for, stone and brick. More daring buildings soon followed, with great pillars supporting broad arches and domes. The freedom of concrete also inspired the colonnade screen, a row of purely decorative columns in front of a load-bearing wall. In smaller-scale architecture, concrete's strength freed the floor plan from rectangular cells to a more free-flowing environment.

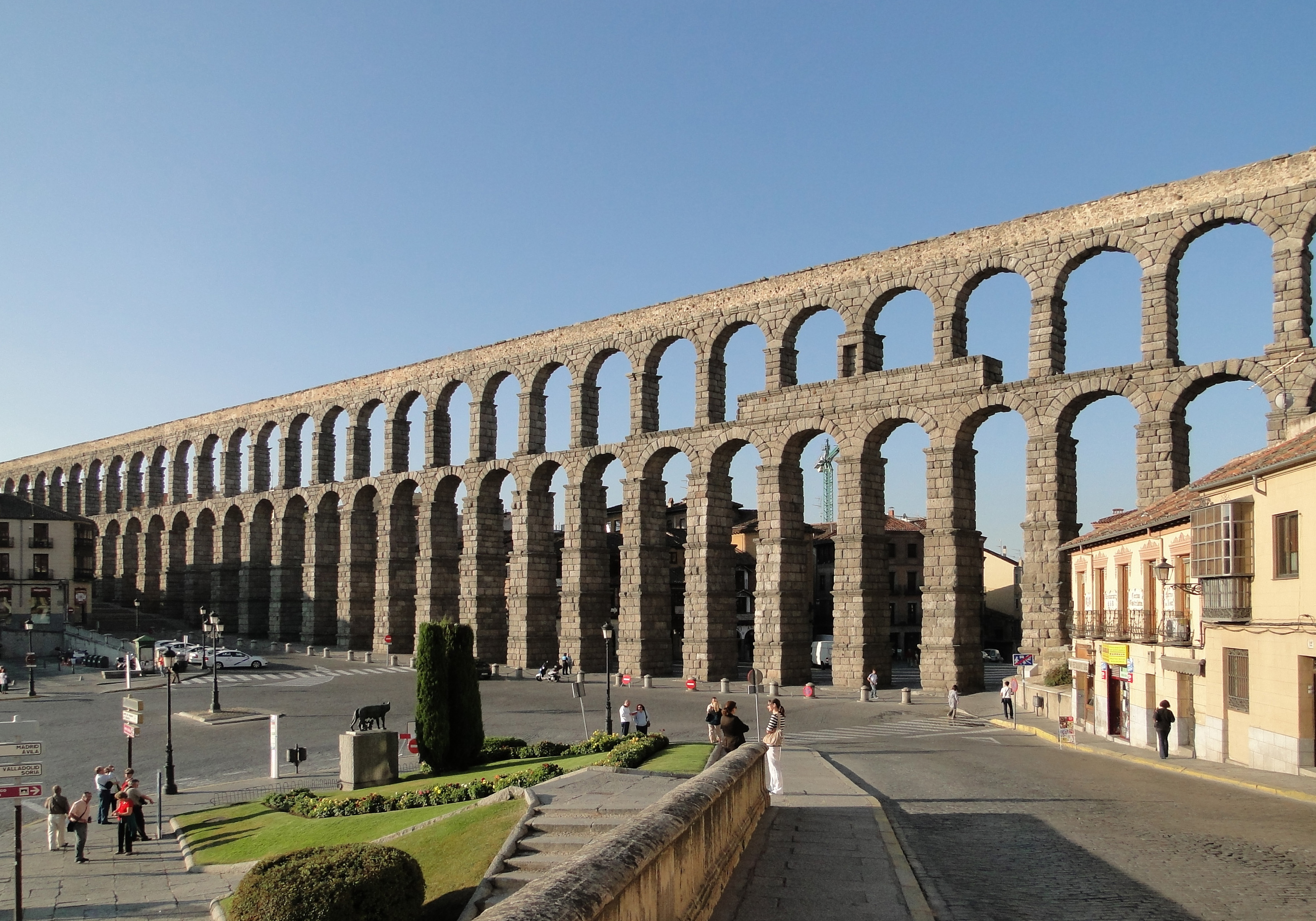
Aqueduct of Segovia (1st century AD), Segovia, Spain

Factors such as wealth and high population densities in cities forced the ancient Romans to discover new architectural solutions of their own. The use of vaults and arches, together with a sound knowledge of building materials, enabled them to achieve unprecedented successes in the construction of imposing infrastructure for public use. Examples include the aqueducts of Rome, the Baths of Diocletian and the Baths of Caracalla, the basilicas and Colosseum. These were reproduced at a smaller scale in the most important towns and cities in the Empire. Some surviving structures are almost complete, such as the town walls of Lugo in Hispania Tarraconensis, now northern Spain. The administrative structure and wealth of the Empire made possible very large projects even in locations remote from the main centers, as did the use of slave labor, both skilled and unskilled.

Especially under the empire, architecture often served a political function, demonstrating the power of the Roman state in general, and of specific individuals responsible for building. Roman architecture perhaps reached its peak in the reign of Hadrian, whose many achievements include rebuilding the Pantheon in its current form and leaving his mark on the landscape of northern Britain with Hadrian's Wall.

=== Origins ===
While borrowing much from the preceding Etruscan architecture, such as the use of hydraulics and the construction of arches, Roman prestige architecture remained firmly under the spell of ancient Greek architecture and the classical orders. This came initially from Magna Graecia, the Greek colonies in southern Italy, and indirectly from Greek influence on the Etruscans. This influence intensified following the Roman conquest of Greece, a process culminating in the sack of Corinth in 146 BCE, after which Greek artworks were transferred to Rome. These works provided direct models for Roman architects and artists, a phenomenon evident in practices such as the introduction and use of the triclinium in Roman villas. Roman builders employed Greeks in many capacities, especially in the great boom in construction in the early Empire.

=== Roman architectural revolution ===
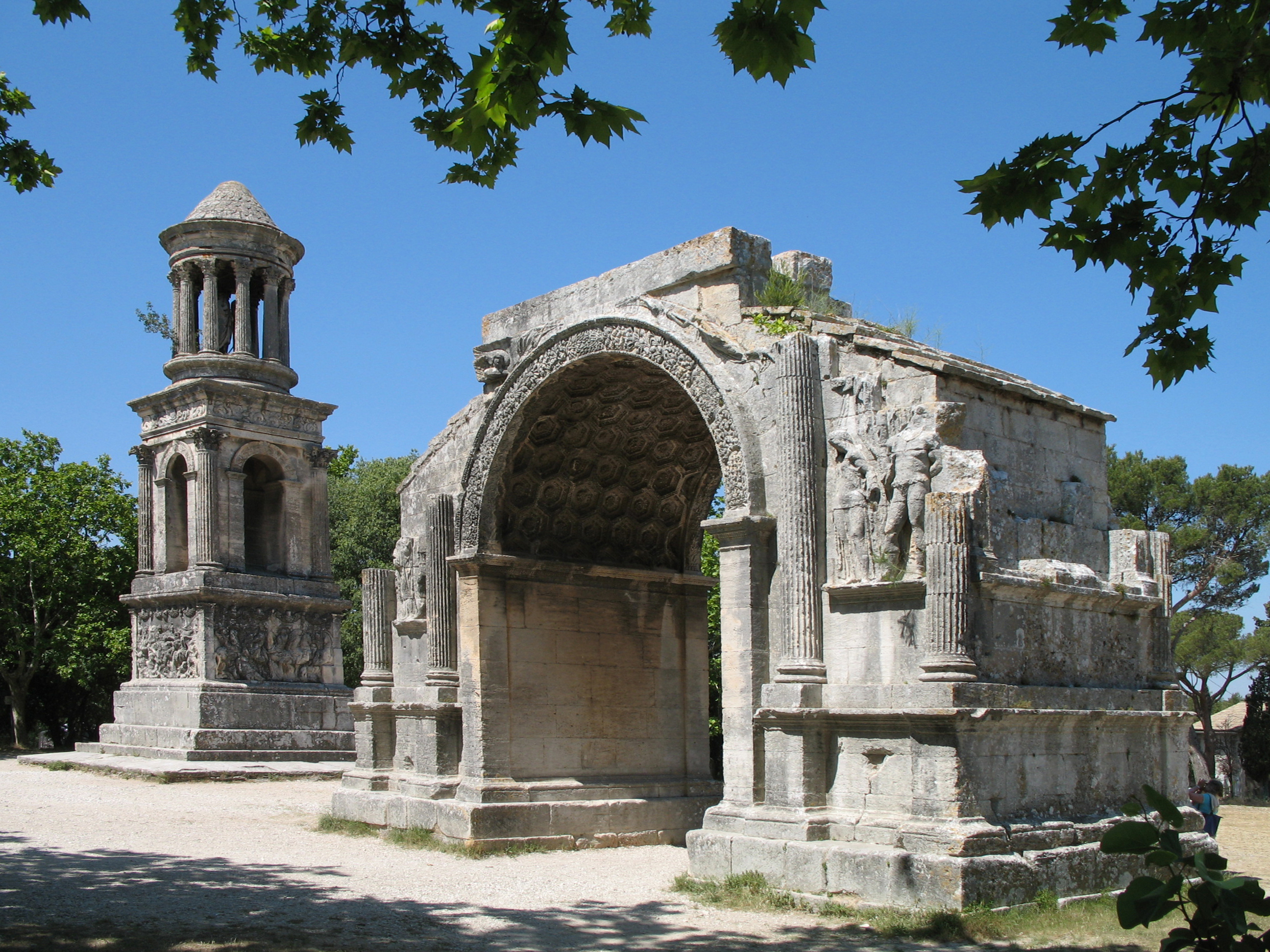
The triumphal arch and monumental mausoleum of Glanum, France, the former built between 10–25 AD during the reign of Augustus and Tiberius (early Roman Empire), and the latter built by 40 BC, or even 30–20 BC, dedicated to veterans of the Gallic Wars during the late Roman Republic

The Roman architectural revolution, also known as the "concrete revolution", was the widespread use in Roman architecture of the previously little-used architectural forms of the arch, vault, and dome. For the first time in history, their potential was fully exploited in the construction of a wide range of civil engineering structures, public buildings, and military facilities. These included amphitheatres, aqueducts, baths, bridges, circuses, dams, domes, harbours, temples, and theatres. According to Gottfried Semper, Roman architecture was "the idea of world domination expressed in stone".

A crucial factor in this development, which saw a trend toward monumental architecture, was the invention of Roman concrete (opus caementicium), which led to the liberation of shapes from the dictates of the traditional materials of stone and brick.

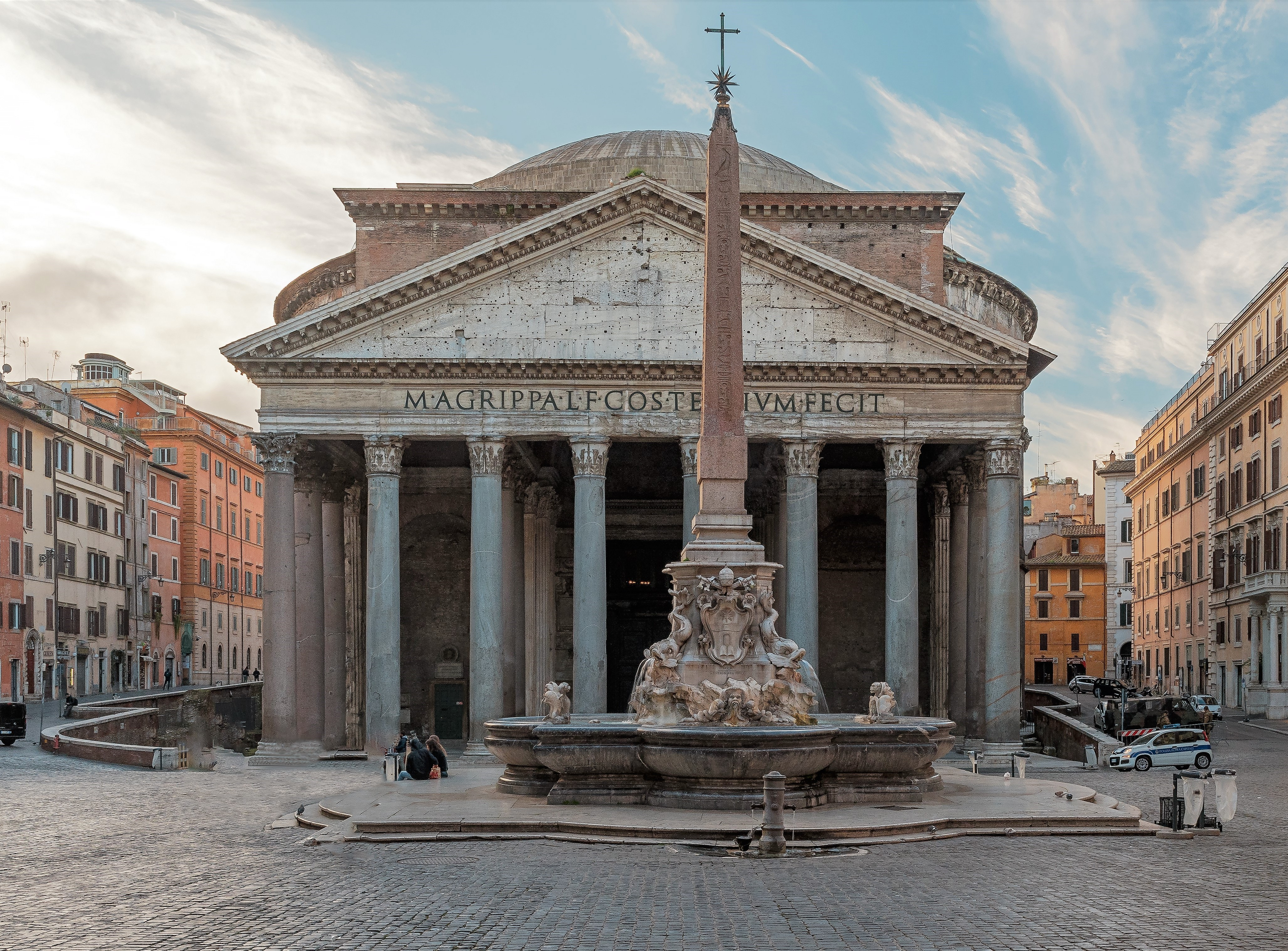
The Pantheon of Rome, Italy, a Roman temple rebuilt in the 2nd century during the Imperial era

These enabled the building of the many aqueducts throughout the Roman Empire, such as the Aqueduct of Segovia, the Pont du Gard, and the eleven aqueducts of Rome. The same concepts produced numerous bridges, some of which are still in daily use, for example, the Puente Romano at Mérida in Spain, and the Pont Julien and the bridge at Vaison-la-Romaine, both in Provence, France.

The dome permitted the construction of vaulted ceilings without crossbeams and made possible large covered public spaces such as public baths and basilicas, such as Hadrian's Pantheon, the Baths of Diocletian and the Baths of Caracalla, all in Rome.

The Romans first adopted the arch from the Etruscans and implemented it in their own building. The use of arches that spring directly from the tops of columns was a Roman development, seen from the 1st century AD, that was very widely adopted in medieval Western, Byzantine and Islamic architecture.

=== Domes ===
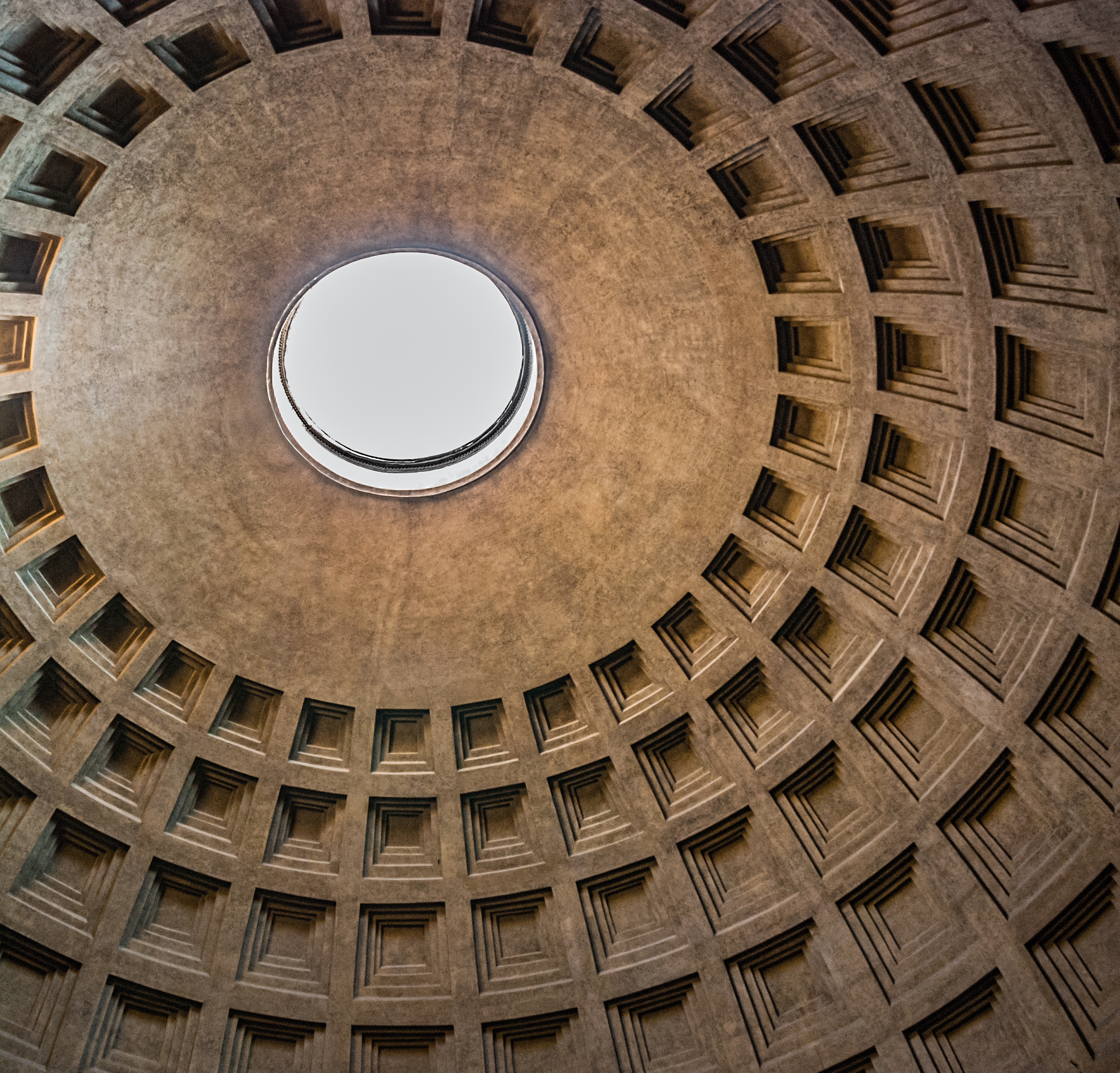
Dome of the Pantheon, inner view

The Romans were the first builders in the history of architecture to realize the potential of domes for the creation of large and well-defined interior spaces. Domes were introduced in a number of Roman building types such as temples, thermae, palaces, mausolea and later also churches. Half-domes also became a favored architectural element and were adopted as apses in Christian sacred architecture.

Monumental domes began to appear in the 1st century BC in Rome and the provinces around the Mediterranean Sea. Along with vaults, they gradually replaced the traditional post and lintel construction, which makes use of the column and architrave. The construction of domes was greatly facilitated by the invention of concrete, a process that has been termed the Roman architectural revolution. Their enormous dimensions remained unsurpassed until the introduction of structural steel frames in the late 19th century (see List of the world's largest domes).

== Influence on later architecture ==
Roman architecture supplied the basic vocabulary of Pre-Romanesque and Romanesque architecture, and spread across Christian Europe well beyond the old frontiers of the empire, to Ireland and Scandinavia for example. In the East, Byzantine architecture developed new styles of churches, but most other buildings remained very close to Late Roman forms. The same can be said of later Islamic architecture, where Roman forms long continued, especially in private buildings such as houses and the bathhouse, and civil engineering such as fortifications and bridges.

In Europe the Italian Renaissance saw a conscious revival of correct classical styles, initially purely based on Roman examples. Vitruvius was respectfully reinterpreted by a series of architectural writers, and the Tuscan and Composite orders formalized for the first time, to give five rather than three orders. After the flamboyance of Baroque architecture, the Neoclassical architecture of the 18th century revived purer versions of classical style, and for the first time added direct influence from the Greek world.

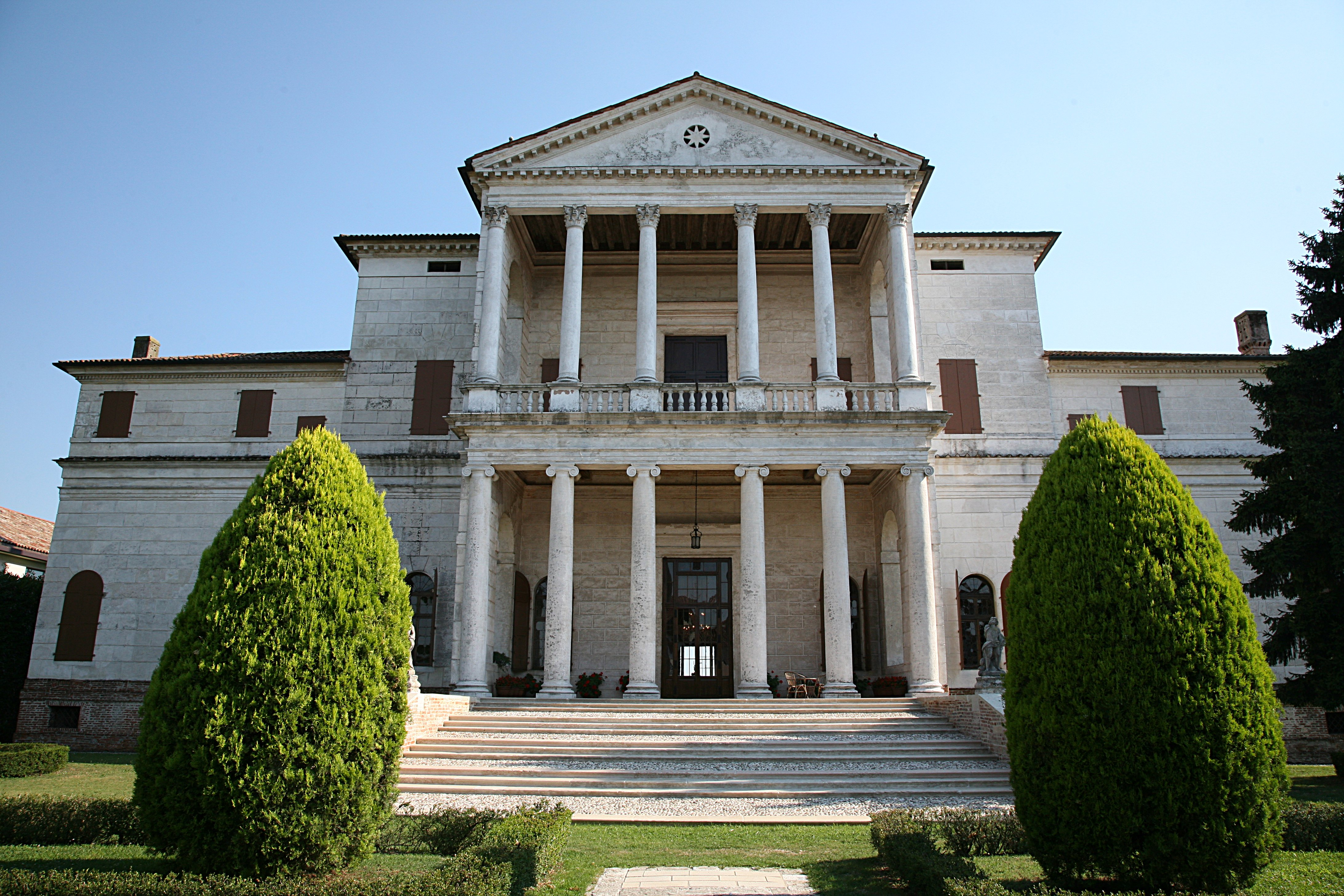
Villa Cornaro, designed by Andrea Palladio in 1552

Numerous local classical styles developed, such as Palladian architecture, Georgian architecture and Regency architecture in the English-speaking world, Federal architecture in the United States, and later Stripped Classicism and PWA Moderne.

Roman influences may be found around us today, in banks, government buildings, great houses, and even small houses, perhaps in the form of a porch with Doric columns and a pediment or in a fireplace or a mosaic shower floor derived from a Roman original, often from Pompeii or Herculaneum. The mighty pillars, domes and arches of Rome echo in the New World too, where in Washington, D.C. stand the Capitol building, the White House, the Lincoln Memorial, and other government buildings. All across the US the seats of regional government were normally built in the grand traditions of Rome, with vast flights of stone steps sweeping up to towering pillared porticoes, with huge domes gilded or decorated inside with the same or similar themes that were popular in Rome.

In Britain, a similar enthusiasm has seen the construction of thousands of neoclassical buildings over the last five centuries, both civic and domestic, and many of the grandest country houses and mansions are purely Classical in style, an obvious example being Buckingham Palace.

== Materials ==
=== Stone ===
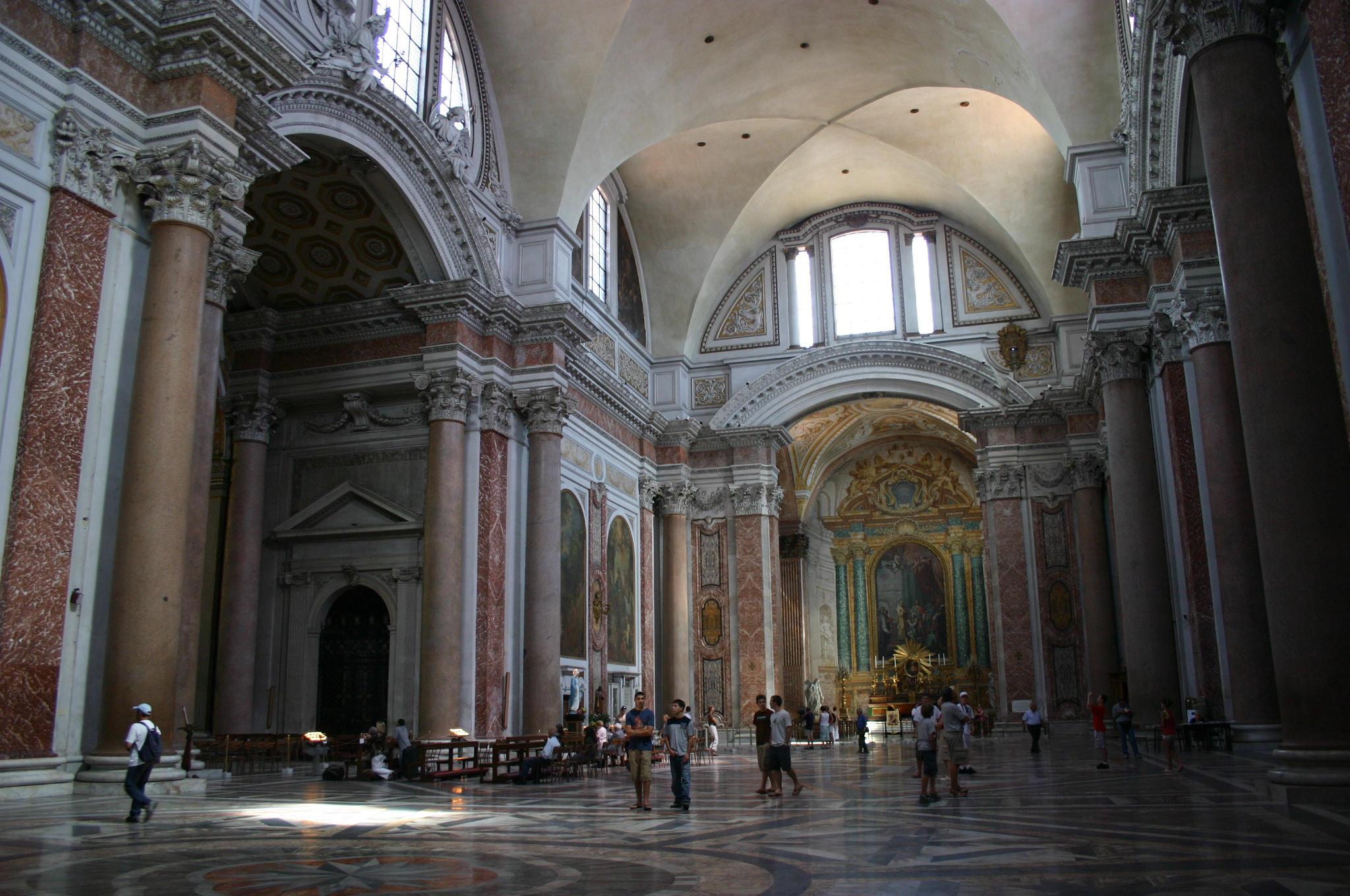
Frigidarium of Baths of Diocletian, today Santa Maria degli Angeli

Marble is not found especially close to Rome, and was only rarely used there before Augustus, who famously boasted that he had found Rome made of brick and left it made of marble, though this was mainly as a facing for brick or concrete. The Temple of Hercules Victor of the late 2nd century BC is the earliest surviving exception in Rome. From Augustus' reign the quarries at Carrara were extensively developed for the capital, and other sources around the empire exploited, especially the prestigious Greek marbles like Parian. Travertine limestone was found much closer, around Tivoli, and was used from the end of the Republic; the Colosseum is mainly built of this stone, which has good load-bearing capacity, with a brick core. Other more or less local stones were used around the Empire.

The Romans were fond of luxury imported coloured marbles with fancy veining, and the interiors of the most important buildings were often faced with slabs of these, which have usually now been removed even where the building survives. Imports from Greece for this purpose began in the 2nd century BC.

=== Roman brick ===
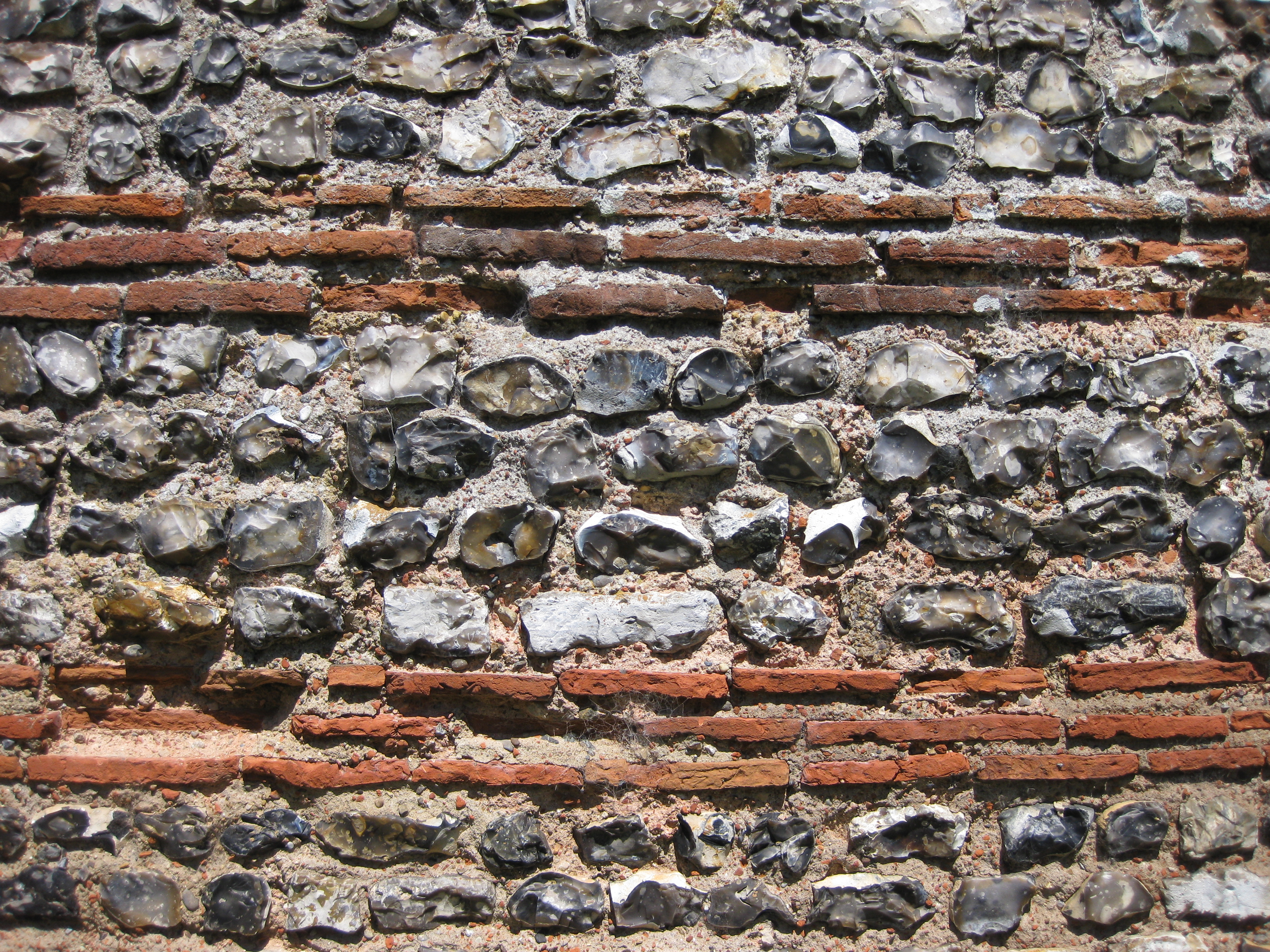
Close-up view of the wall of the Roman shore fort at Burgh Castle, Norfolk, showing alternating courses of flint and brickwork

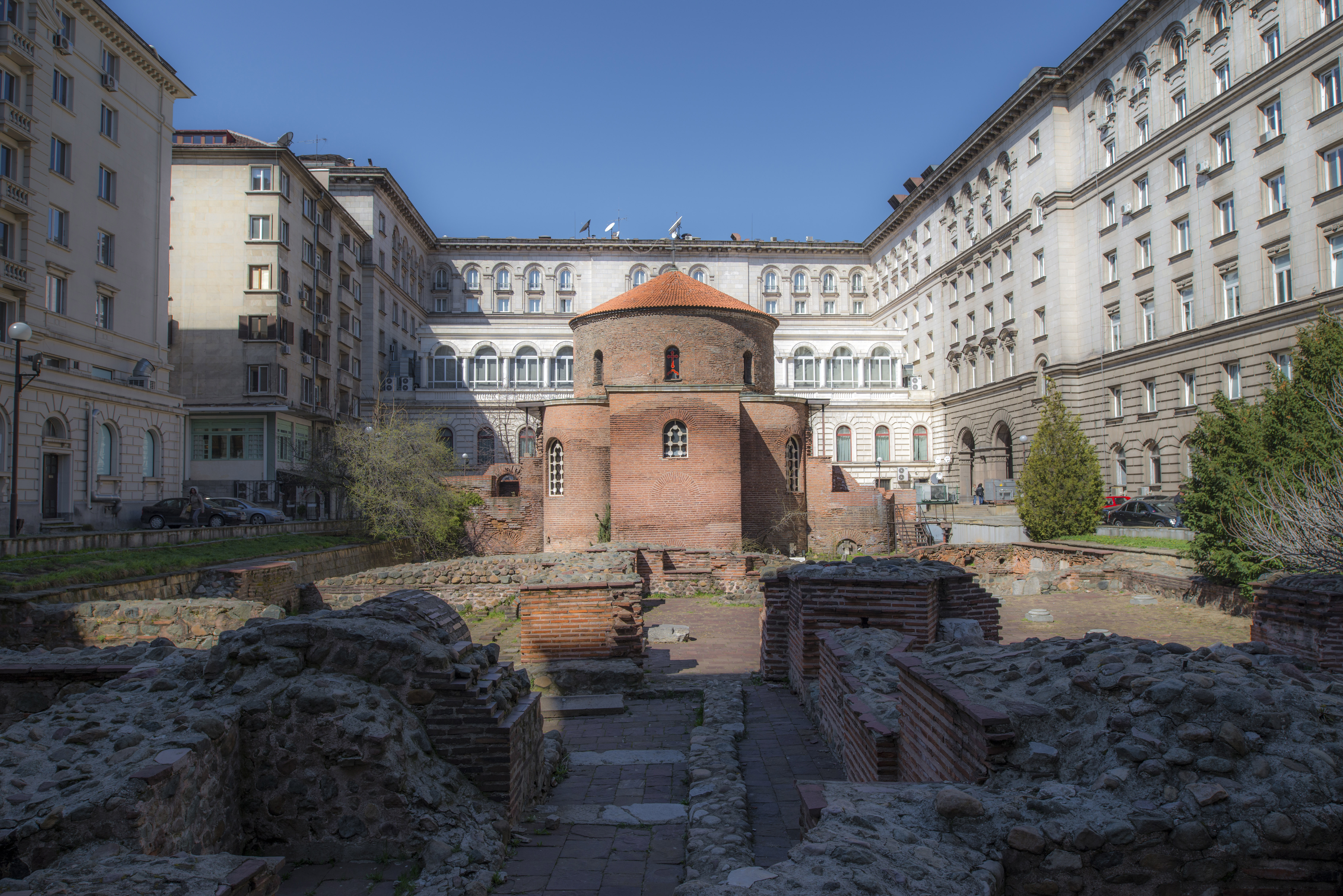
The St. George Rotunda (4th century) and remains of Serdica, Sofia, Bulgaria

The Romans made fired clay bricks from about the beginning of the Empire, replacing earlier sun-dried mudbrick. Roman brick was almost invariably of a lesser height than modern brick, but was made in a variety of different shapes and sizes. Shapes included square, rectangular, triangular and round, and the largest bricks found have measured over three feet in length. Ancient Roman bricks had a general size of 1½ Roman feet by 1 Roman foot, but common variations up to 15 inches existed. Other brick sizes in ancient Rome included 24" x 12" x 4", and 15" x 8" x 10". Ancient Roman bricks found in France measured 8" x 8" x 3". The Constantine Basilica in Trier is constructed from Roman bricks 15" square by 1½" thick. There is often little obvious difference (particularly when only fragments survive) between Roman bricks used for walls on the one hand, and tiles used for roofing or flooring on the other, so archaeologists sometimes prefer to employ the generic term ceramic building material (CBM).

The Romans perfected brick-making during the first century of their empire and used it ubiquitously, in public and private construction alike. They took their brickmaking skills everywhere they went, introducing the craft to the local populations. The Roman legions, which operated their own kilns, introduced bricks to many parts of the Empire; bricks are often stamped with the mark of the legion that supervised their production. The use of bricks in southern and western Germany, for example, can be traced to traditions already described by the Roman architect Vitruvius. In the British Isles, the introduction of Roman brick by the ancient Romans was followed by a 600–700 year gap in major brick production.

=== Roman concrete ===
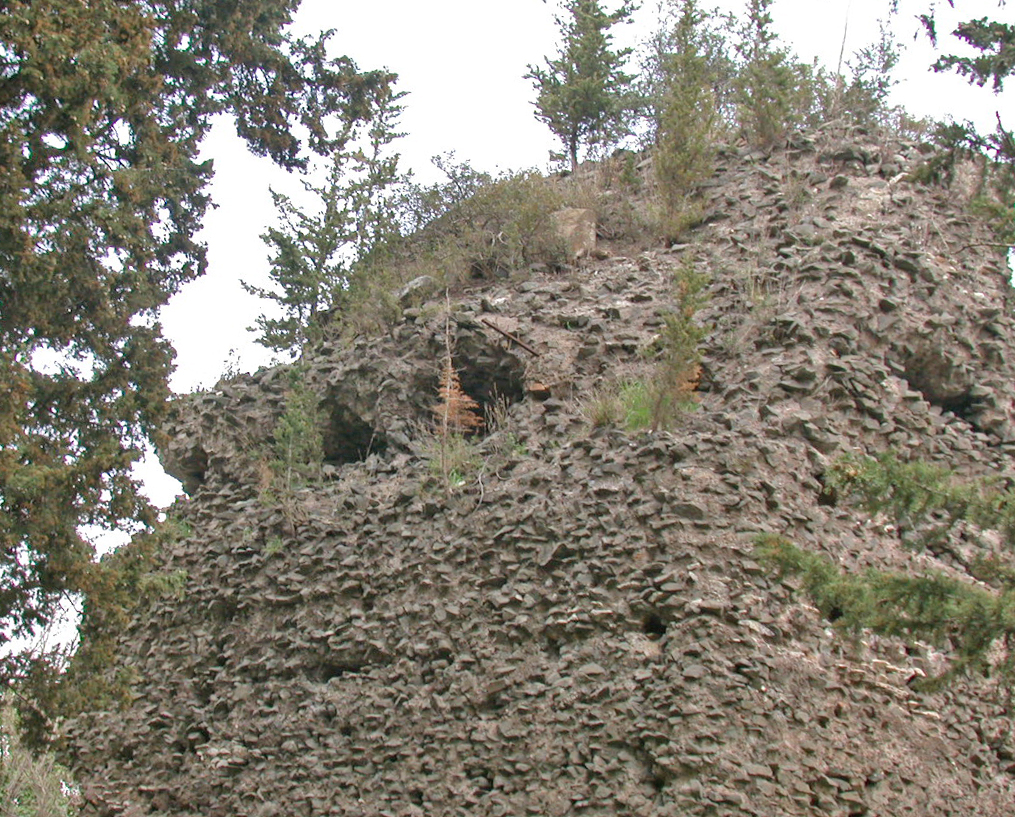
Example of opus caementicium on a tomb on the ancient Appian Way in Rome. The original covering has been removed.

Concrete quickly supplanted brick as the primary building material, and more daring buildings soon followed, with great pillars supporting broad arches and domes rather than dense lines of columns suspending flat architraves. The freedom of concrete also inspired the colonnade screen, a row of purely decorative columns in front of a load-bearing wall. In smaller-scale architecture, concrete's strength freed the floor plan from rectangular cells to a more free-flowing environment. Most of these developments are described by Vitruvius, writing in the first century BC in his work De architectura.

Although concrete had been used on a minor scale in Mesopotamia, Roman architects perfected Roman concrete and used it in buildings where it could stand on its own and support a great deal of weight. The first use of concrete by the Romans was in the town of Cosa sometime after 273 BC. Ancient Roman concrete was a mixture of lime mortar, aggregate, pozzolana ash, water, and stones, and was stronger than previously used concretes. The ancient builders placed these ingredients in wooden frames where they hardened and bonded to a facing of stones or (more frequently) bricks. The aggregates used were often much larger than in modern concrete, amounting to rubble.

When the framework was removed, the new wall was very strong, with a rough surface of bricks or stones. This surface could be smoothed and faced with an attractive stucco or thin panels of marble or other coloured stones called a "revetment". Concrete construction proved to be more flexible and less costly than building solid stone buildings. The materials were readily available and not difficult to transport. The wooden frames could be used more than once, allowing builders to work quickly and efficiently. Concrete is arguably the Roman contribution most relevant to modern architecture.

== Building types ==
=== Amphitheatre ===
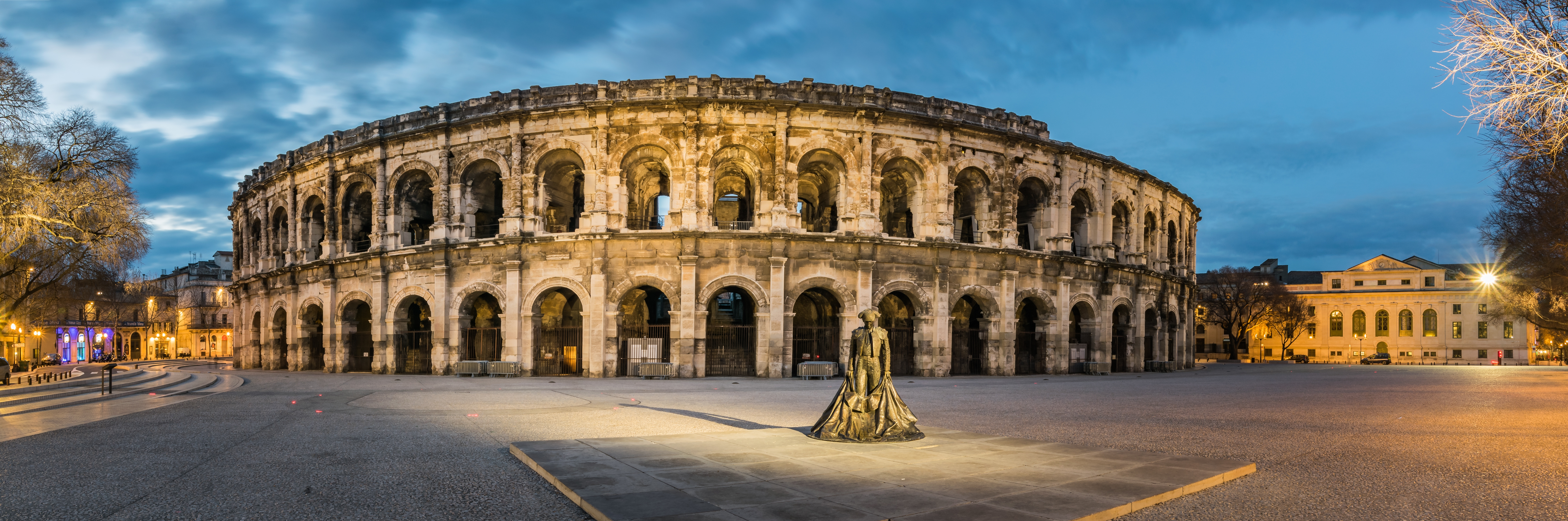
Arena of Nîmes (c. 100 CE)

The amphitheatre was, with the triumphal arch and basilica, the only major new type of building developed by the Romans. Some of the most impressive secular buildings are the amphitheatres; over 200 are known, many of which are well preserved, such as that at Arles, as well as its progenitor, the Colosseum in Rome. They were used for gladiatorial contests, public displays, public meetings and bullfights, a tradition that still survives in Spain and Portugal. Their typical shape, functions, and name distinguish them from Roman theatres, which are more or less semicircular in shape; from the circuses (akin to hippodromes) whose much longer circuits were designed mainly for horse or chariot racing events; and from the smaller stadia, which were primarily designed for athletics and footraces.

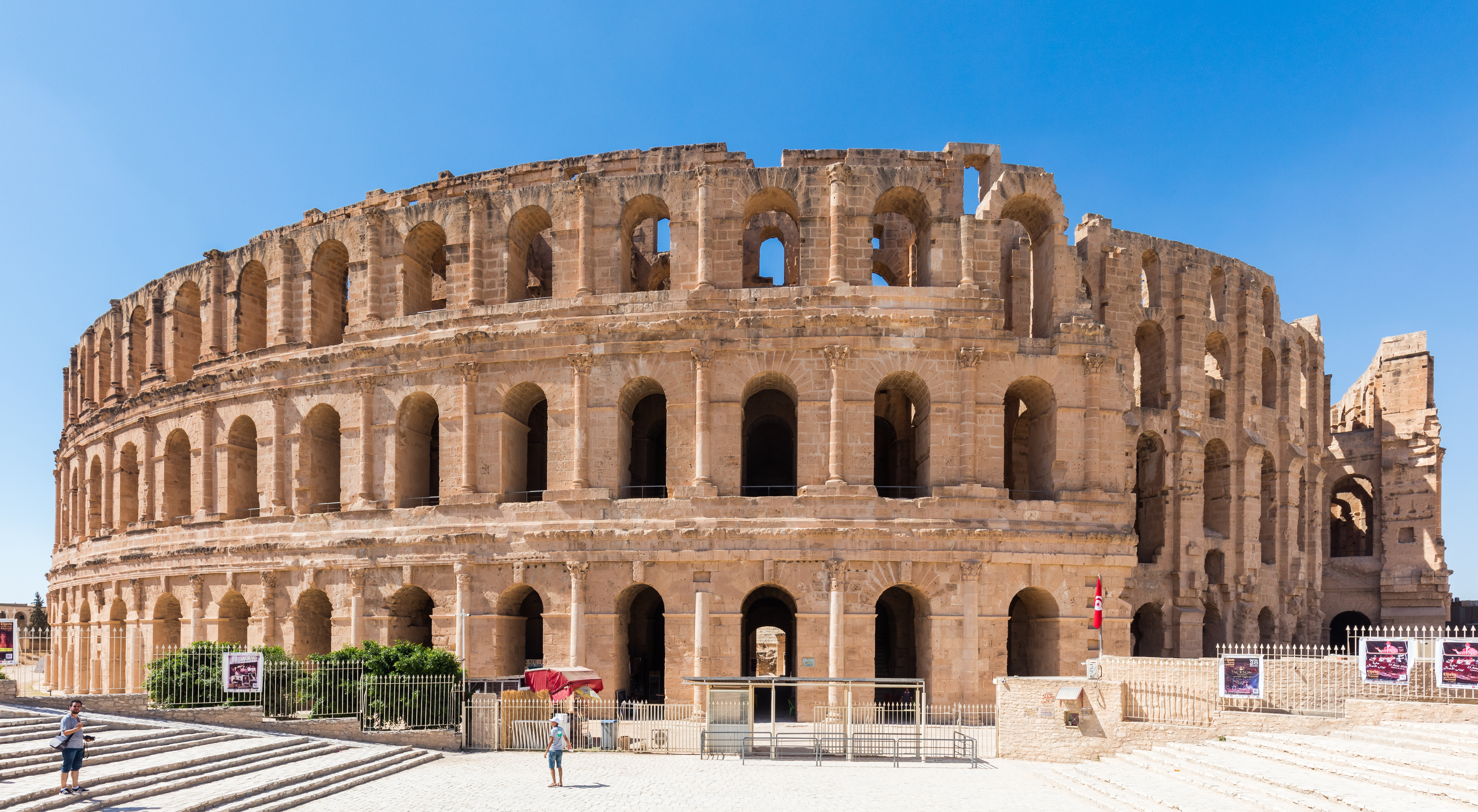
Amphitheatre of El Jem (c. 238 CE)

The earliest Roman amphitheatres date from the middle of the first century BC, but most were built under Imperial rule, from the Augustan period (27 BC–14 AD) onwards. Imperial amphitheatres were built throughout the Roman Empire; the largest could accommodate 40,000–60,000 spectators, and the most elaborate featured multi-storeyed, arcaded façades and were elaborately decorated with marble, stucco and statuary. After the end of gladiatorial games in the 5th century and of animal killings in the 6th, most amphitheatres fell into disrepair, and their materials were mined or recycled. Some were razed, and others converted into fortifications. A few continued as convenient open meeting places; in some of these, churches were sited.

Architecturally, they are typically an example of the Roman use of the classical orders to decorate large concrete walls pierced at intervals, where the columns have nothing to support. Aesthetically, however, the formula is successful.

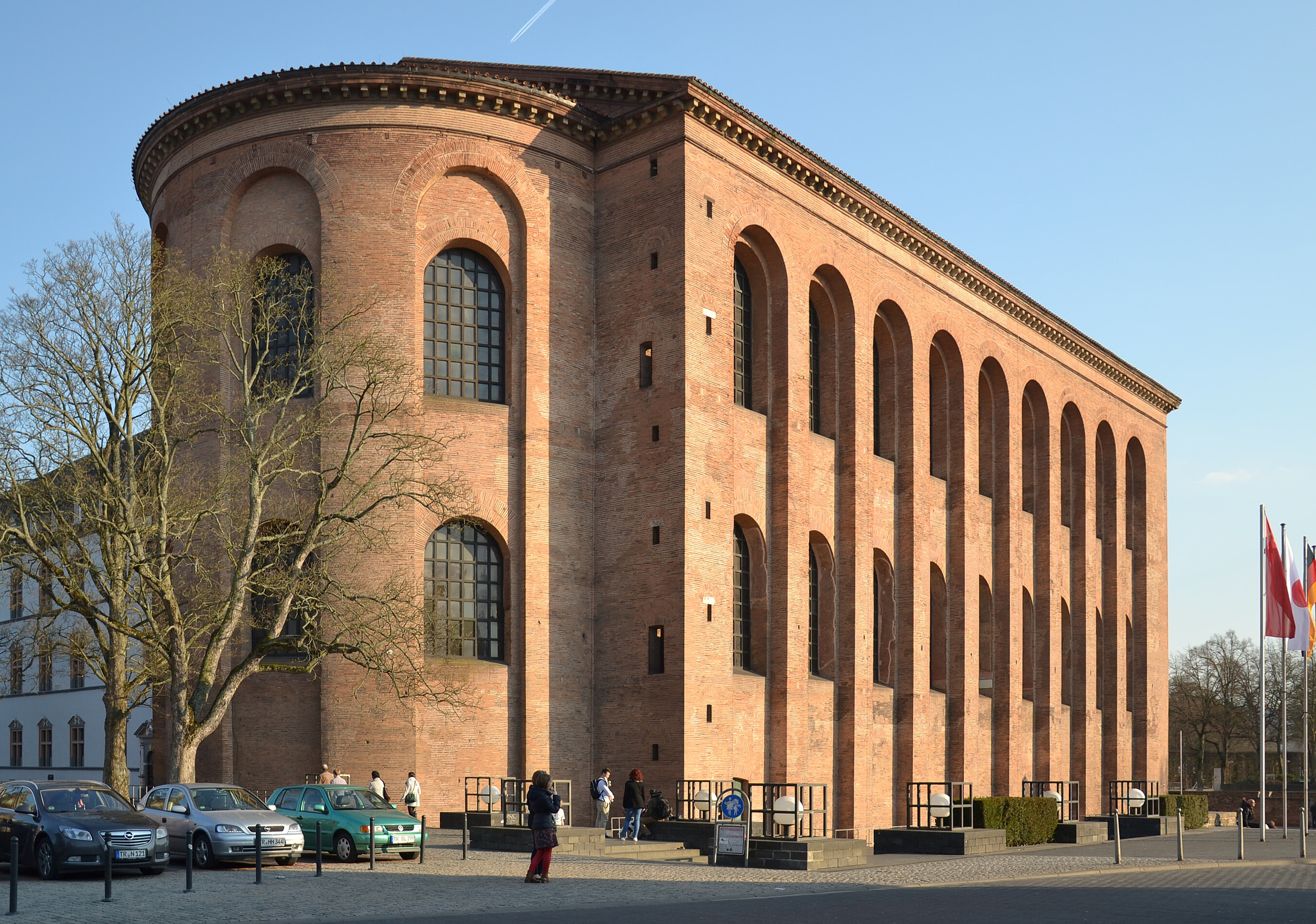
The Aula Palatina of Trier, Germany (then part of the Roman province of Gallia Belgica), built during the reign of Constantine I (r. 306–337 CE)

=== Basilica ===
The Roman basilica was a large public building where business or legal matters could be transacted. They were normally where the magistrates held court, and were used for other official ceremonies, having many of the functions of the modern town hall. The first basilicas had no religious function. As early as the time of Augustus, a public basilica for transacting business had been part of any settlement that considered itself a city, used in the same way as the late medieval covered market houses of northern Europe, where the meeting room, for lack of urban space, was set above the arcades. Although their form was variable, basilicas often contained interior colonnades that divided the space, giving aisles or arcaded spaces on one or both sides, with an apse at one end (or less often at each end), where the magistrates sat, often on a slightly raised dais. The central aisle tended to be wide and was higher than the flanking aisles, so that light could penetrate through the clerestory windows.

The oldest known basilica, the Basilica Porcia, was built in Rome in 184 BC by Cato the Elder during the time he was censor. Other early examples include the basilica at Pompeii (late 2nd century BC). After Christianity became the official religion, the basilica shape was found appropriate for the first large public churches, with the attraction of avoiding reminiscences of the Greco-Roman temple form.

=== Circus ===
The Roman circus was a large open-air venue used for public events in the ancient Roman Empire. The circuses were similar to the ancient Greek hippodromes, although circuses served varying purposes and differed in design and construction. Along with theatres and amphitheatres, circuses were one of the main entertainment sites of the time. Circuses were venues for chariot racing, horse races; performances that commemorated important events of the Empire were performed there. For events that involved re-enactments of naval battles, the circus was flooded with water.

The performance space of the Roman circus was normally, despite its name, an oblong rectangle of two linear sections of race track, separated by a median strip running along the length of about two thirds the track, joined at one end with a semicircular section and at the other end with an undivided section of track, closed (in most cases) by a distinctive starting gate known as the carceres, thereby creating a circuit for the races.

=== Forum ===
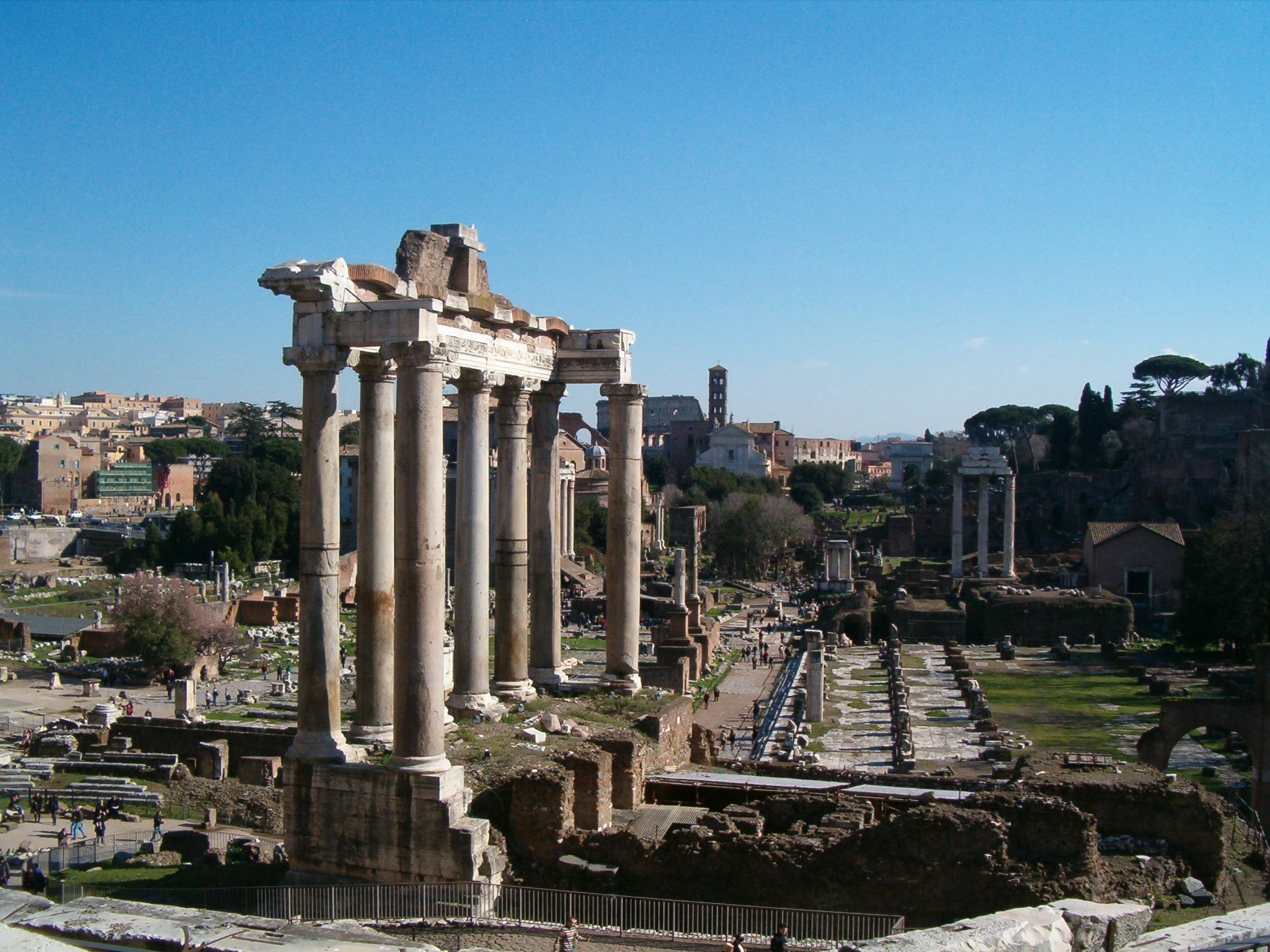
The Roman Forum

During the years of the Republic, Augustus claimed he "found the city in brick and left it in marble". While chances are high that this was an exaggeration, there is something to be said for the influx of marble use in Roman fora from 63 BC onwards. During Augustus' reign, the forum was described as "a larger, freer space than was the Forum of Imperial times." The forum began to take on even more changes upon the arrival of Julius Caesar, who drew out extensive plans for the market hub. While Caesar's death came prematurely, his ideas, as well as Augustus' in regards to the forum proved to be the most influential for years to come. According to Walter Dennison's The Roman Forum As Cicero Saw It, the author writes that "the diverting of public business to the larger and splendid Imperial fora erected in the vicinity resulted in leaving the general design of the Forum Romanum".

Every city had at least one forum of varying size. In addition to its standard function as a marketplace, a forum was a gathering place of great social significance, and often the scene of diverse activities, including political discussions and debates, rendezvous, meetings, etc. The best known example is the Roman Forum, the earliest of several in Rome. In new Roman towns the forum was usually located at, or just off, the intersection of the main north–south and east–west streets (the cardo and decumanus). All forums would have a Temple of Jupiter at the north end, and would also contain other temples, as well as the basilica; a public weights and measures table, so customers at the market could ensure they were not being sold short measures; and would often have the baths nearby.

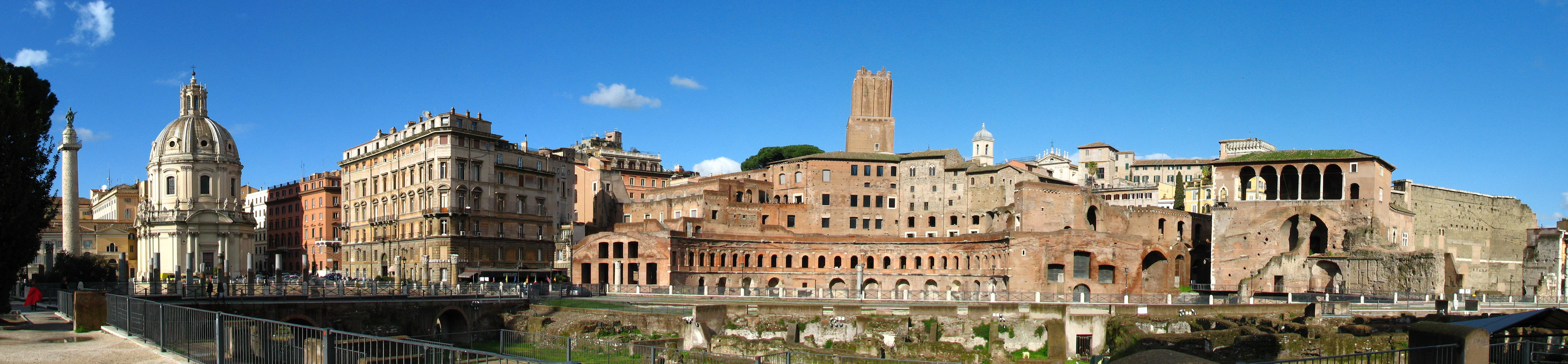
A panoramic view of the Forum Trajanum, with Trajan's Column on the far left

=== Horreum ===
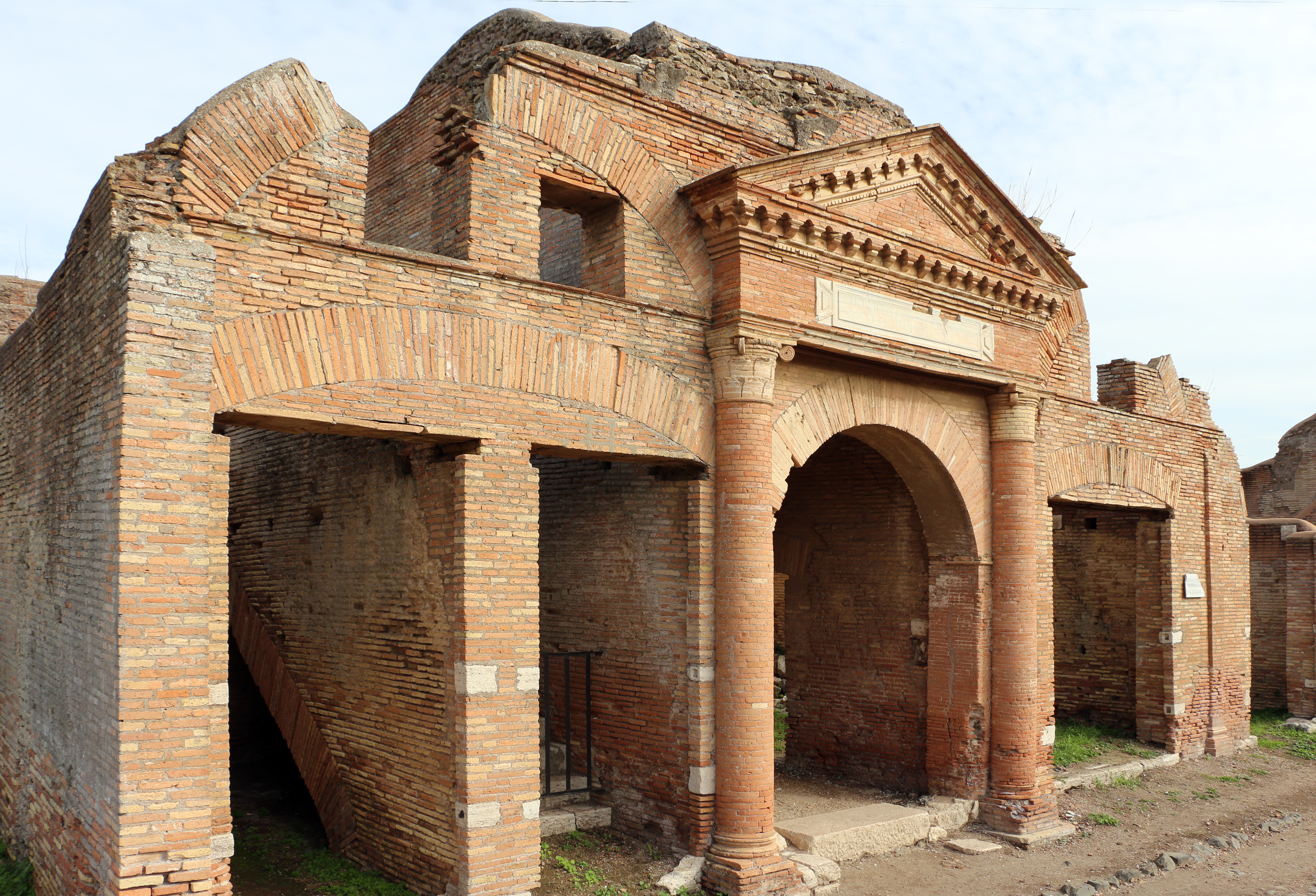
The Horrea Epagathiana et Epaphroditiana, a horreum in Ostia (Rome), Italy, built c. 145–150 AD

A horreum was a type of public warehouse used during the ancient Roman period. Although the Latin term is often used to refer to granaries, Roman horrea were used to store many other types of consumables as well; the giant Horrea Galbae in Rome were used not only to store grain but also olive oil, wine, foodstuffs, clothing and even marble. By the end of the Imperial period, the city of Rome had nearly 300 horrea to supply its demands. The biggest were enormous, even by modern standards; the Horrea Galbae contained 140 rooms on the ground floor alone, covering an area of some 225,000 square feet (20,900 square metres).

The first horrea were built in Rome towards the end of the 2nd century BC, with the first known public horreum being constructed by the ill-fated tribune Gaius Gracchus in 123 BC. The word came to be applied to any place designated for the preservation of goods; thus, it was often used to refer to cellars (horrea subterranea), but it could also be applied to a place where artworks were stored, or even to a library. Some public horrea functioned somewhat like banks, where valuables could be stored, but the most important class of horrea were those where foodstuffs such as grain and olive oil were stored and distributed by the state.

The word itself is thought to have linguist roots tied to the word hordeum, which in Latin means barley. In the Johns Hopkins University Press, The Classical Weekly states that "Pliny the Elder does indeed make a distinction between the two words. He describes the horreum as a structure made of brick, the walls of which were not less than three feet thick; it had no windows or openings for ventilation". Furthermore, the storehouses would also house oil and wine and also use large jars that could serve as cache's for large amounts of products. These storehouses were also used to keep large sums of money and were used much like personal storage units today are. "These horrea were divided and subdivided, so that one could hire only so much space as one wanted, a whole room (cella), a closet (armarium), or only a chest or strong box (arca, arcula, locus, loculus)."

=== Insula ===
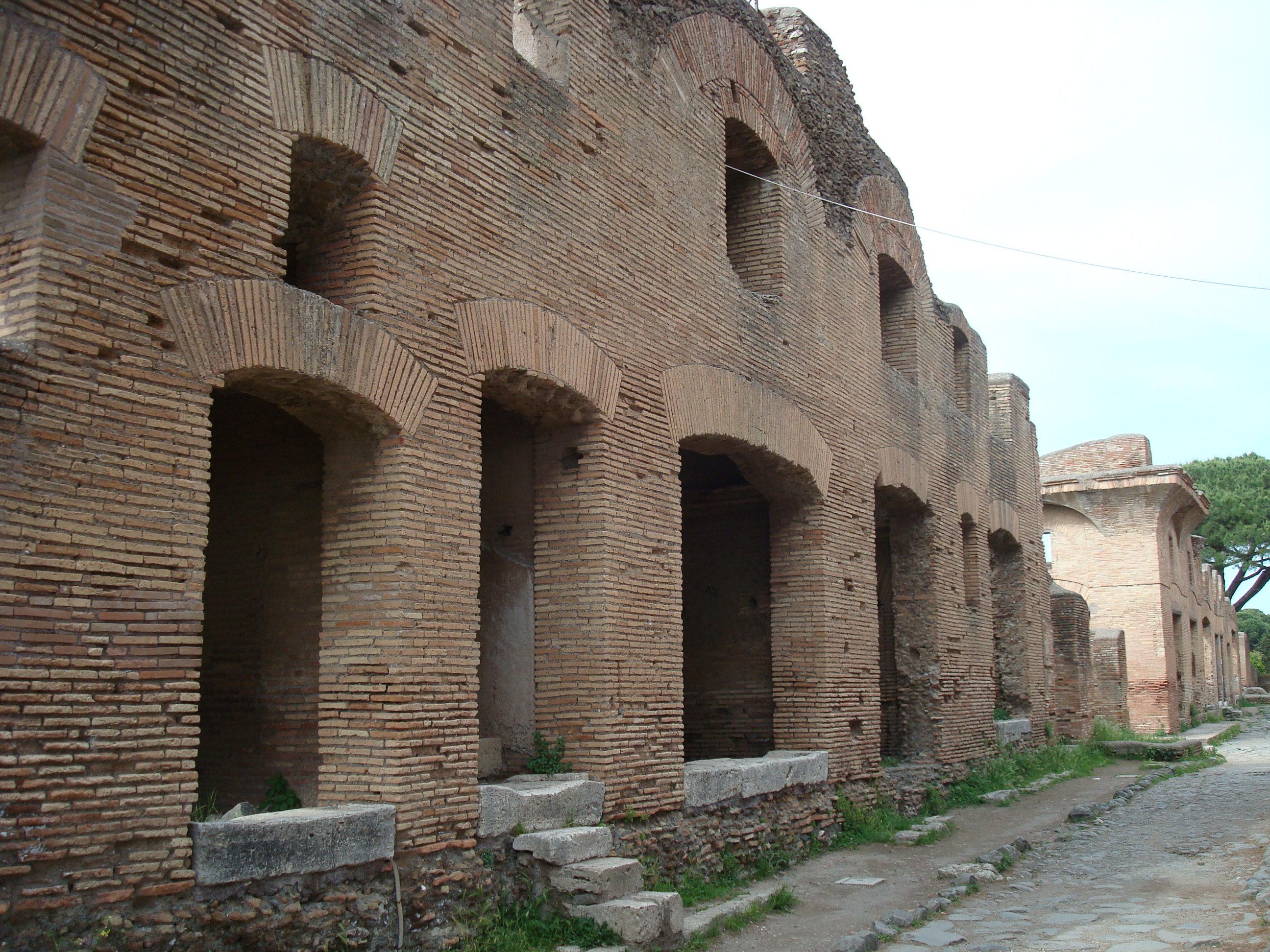
Insula in Ostia Antica

Multi-story apartment blocks called insulae catered to a range of residential needs. The cheapest rooms were at the top owing to the inability to escape in the event of a fire and the lack of piped water. Windows were mostly small, facing the street, with iron security bars. Insulae were often dangerous, unhealthy, and prone to fires because of overcrowding and haphazard cooking arrangements. There are examples in the Roman port town of Ostia, that date to the reign of Trajan, but they seem to have been found mainly in Rome and a few other places. Elsewhere writers report them as something remarkable, but Livy and Vitruvius refer to them in Rome. External walls were in opus reticulatum and interiors in opus incertum, which would then be plastered and sometimes painted.

To lighten up the small dark rooms, some tenants were able to afford a degree of painted colourful murals on the walls. Examples have been found of jungle scenes with wild animals and exotic plants. Imitation windows (trompe-l'œil) were sometimes painted to make the rooms seem less confined.

Ancient Rome had elaborate and luxurious houses owned by the elite. The average house, or in cities apartment, of a commoner or plebeius did not contain many luxuries. The domus, or single-family residence, was only for the well-off in Rome, with most having a layout of the closed unit, consisting of one or two rooms. Between 312 and 315 AD Rome had 1781 domus and 44,850 of insulae.

Insulae have been the subject of debate for historians of Roman culture, defining the various meanings of the word. Insula was a word used to describe apartment buildings, or the apartments themselves, meaning apartment, or inhabitable room, demonstrating just how small apartments for plebeians were. Urban divisions were originally street blocks, and later began to divide into smaller divisions, the word insula referring to both blocks and smaller divisions. The insula contained cenacula, tabernae, storage rooms under the stairs, and lower floor shops. Another type of housing unit for plebs was a cenaculum, an apartment, divided into three individual rooms: cubiculum, exedra, and medianum. Common Roman apartments were mainly masses of smaller and larger structures, many with narrow balconies that present mysteries as to their use, having no doors to access them, and they lacked the excessive decoration and display of wealth that aristocrats' houses contained. Luxury in houses was not common, as the life of the average person did not consist of being in their houses; they instead would go to public baths, and engage in other communal activities.

=== Lighthouses ===
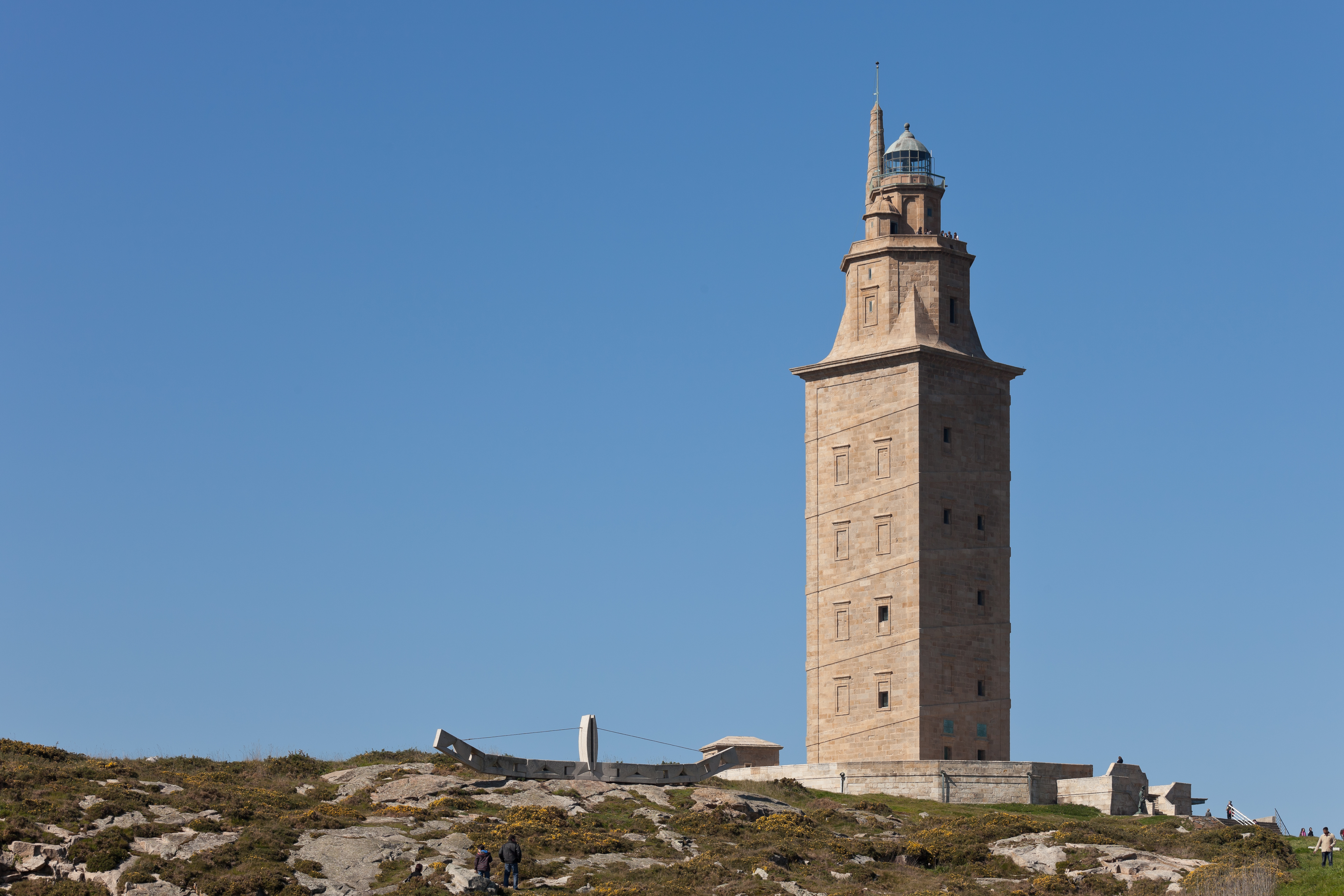
The Tower of Hercules, a Roman lighthouse in Spain

Many lighthouses were built around the Mediterranean and the coasts of the empire, including the Tower of Hercules at A Coruña in northern Spain, a structure that survives to this day. A smaller lighthouse at Dover, England also exists as a ruin about half the height of the original. The light would have been provided by a fire at the top of the structure.

=== Thermae ===
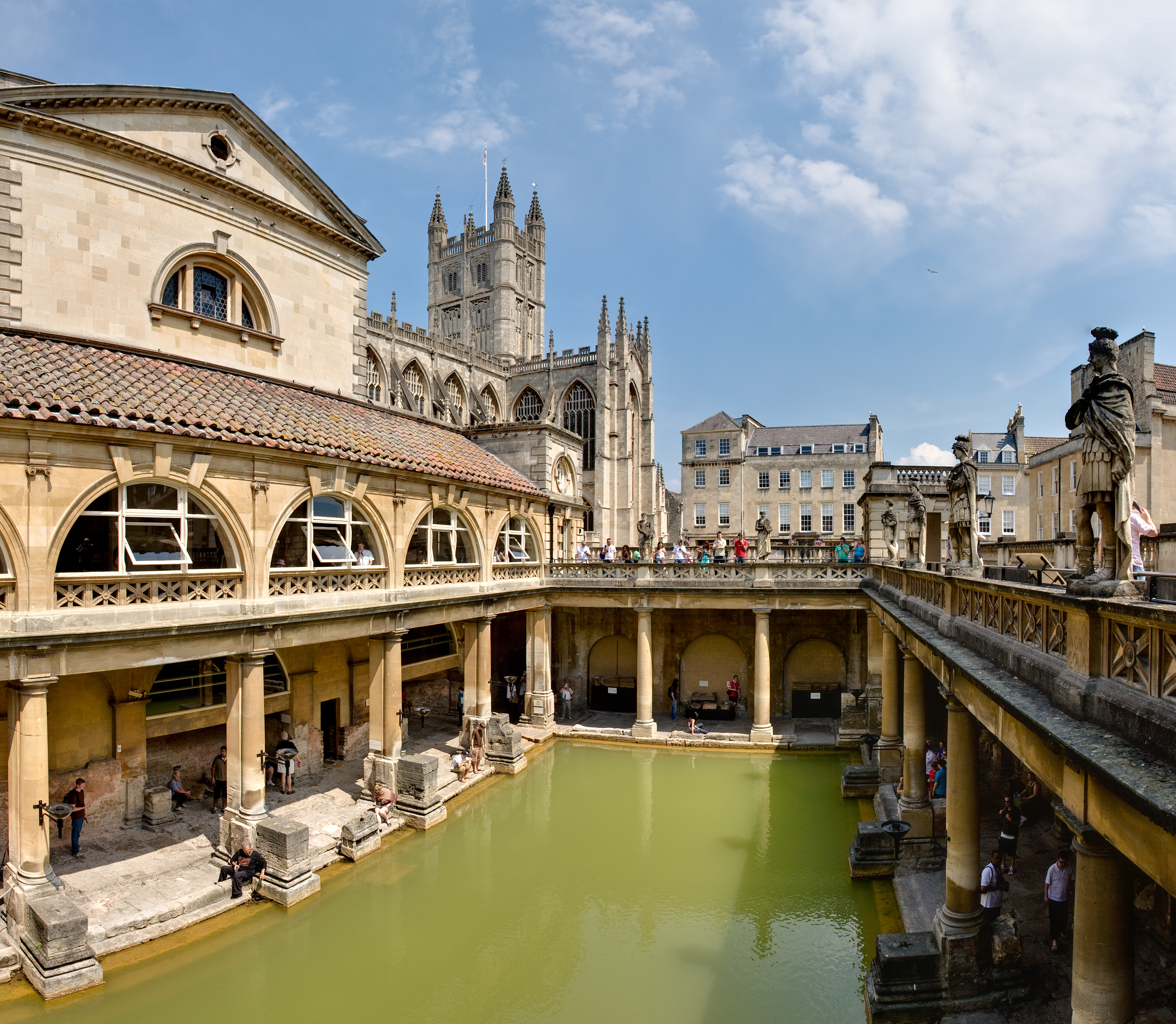
The Roman Baths that lend the city of Bath, England its name

All Roman cities had at least one thermae, a popular facility for public bathing, exercising and socializing. Exercise might include wrestling and weightlifting, as well as swimming. Bathing was an important part of the Roman day, where some hours might be spent, at a very low cost subsidized by the government. Wealthier Romans were often accompanied by one or more slaves, who performed any required tasks such as fetching refreshment, guarding valuables, providing towels, and at the end of the session, applying olive oil to their masters' bodies, which was then scraped off with a strigil, a scraper made of wood or bone.

Roman bath-houses were also provided for private villas, town houses and forts. They were normally supplied with water from an adjacent river or stream, or by aqueduct. The design of thermae is discussed by Vitruvius in De architectura.

=== Temples ===
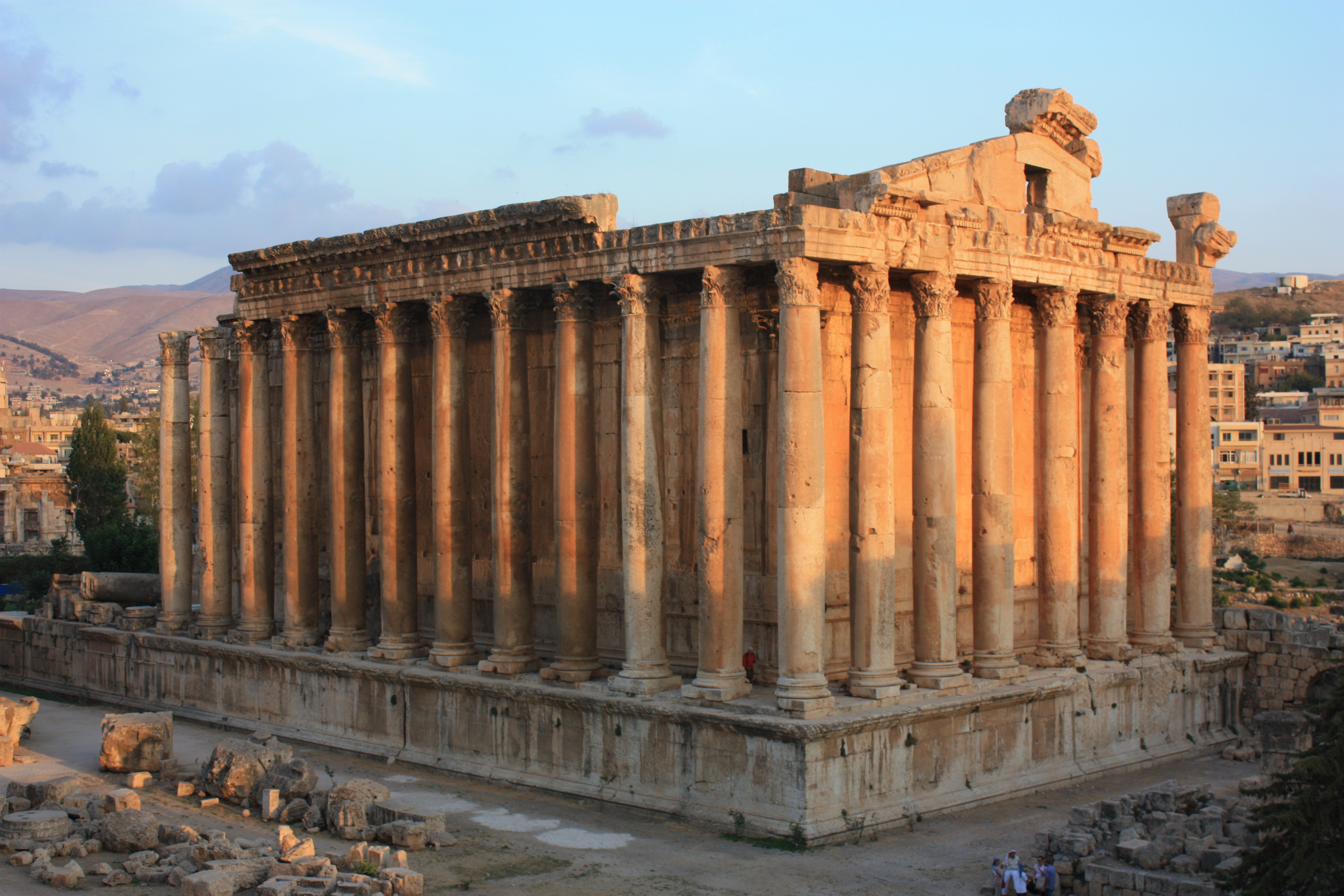
"Roman Baroque" Temple of Bacchus at Baalbek, Lebanon

Roman temples were among the most important and richest buildings in Roman culture, though only a few survive in any sort of complete state. Their construction and maintenance was a major part of ancient Roman religion, and all towns of any importance had at least one main temple, as well as smaller shrines. The main room (cella) housed the cult image of the deity to whom the temple was dedicated, and often a small altar for incense or libations. Behind the cella was a room or rooms used by temple attendants for storage of equipment and offerings.

Remains of many Roman temples survive, above all in Rome itself, but the relatively few near-complete examples were nearly all converted to Christian churches, usually a considerable time after the initial triumph of Christianity under Constantine. The decline of Roman religion was relatively slow, and the temples themselves were not appropriated by the government until a decree of the Emperor Honorius in 415. Some of the oldest surviving temples include the Temple of Hercules Victor (mid 2nd century BC) and Temple of Portunus (120–80 BC), both standing within the Forum Boarium. Original marble columns of the Temple of Janus in Rome's Forum Holitorium, dedicated by Gaius Duilius after his naval victory at the Battle of Mylae in 260 BC, still stand as a component of the exterior wall of the Renaissance era church of San Nicola in Carcere.

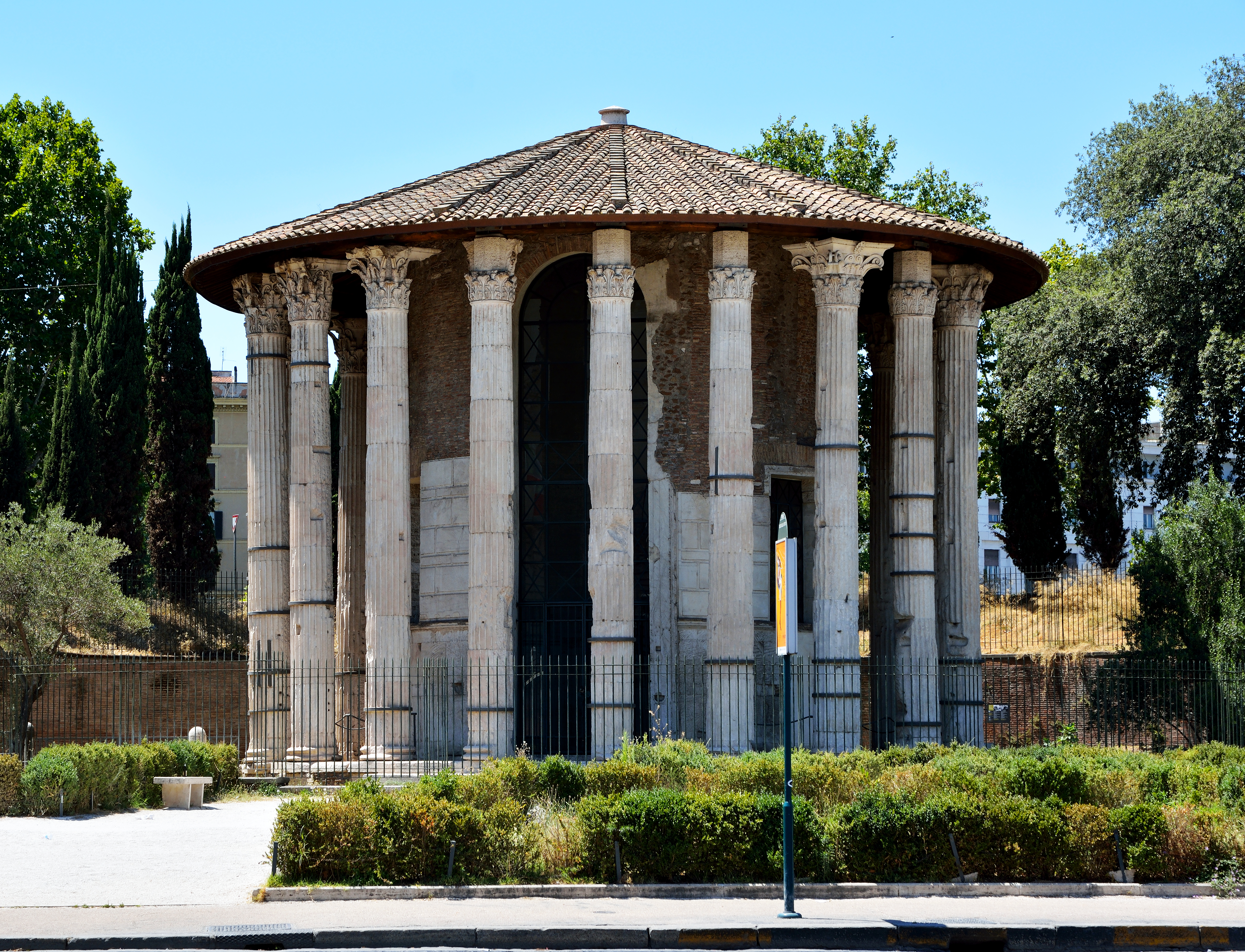
The Temple of Hercules Victor, Rome, built in the mid-2nd century BC, most likely by Lucius Mummius Achaicus, who won the Achaean War

The form of the Roman temple was mainly derived from the Etruscan model, but using Greek styles. Roman temples emphasised the front of the building, which followed Greek temple models and typically consisted of wide steps leading to a portico with columns, a pronaos, and usually a triangular pediment above, which was filled with statuary in the most grand examples; this was as often in terracotta as stone, and no examples have survived except as fragments. However, unlike the Greek models, which generally gave equal treatment to all sides of the temple, which could be viewed and approached from all directions, the sides and rear of Roman temples might be largely undecorated (as in the Pantheon, Rome and temple of Vic), inaccessible by steps (as in the Maison carrée and Vic), and even backing onto other buildings. As in the Maison carrée, columns at the side might be engaged columns, emerging from ("engaged with" in architectural terminology) the wall. The platform on which the temple sat was typically raised higher in Roman examples than Greek, with up to ten, twelve or more steps rather than the three typical in Greek temples; the Temple of Claudius was raised twenty steps. These steps were normally only at the front, and typically not the whole width of that.

The Greek classical orders in all their details were closely followed in the façades of temples, as in other prestigious buildings. However, the idealized proportions between the different elements set out by the only significant Roman writer on architecture to survive, Vitruvius, and subsequent Italian Renaissance writers, do not reflect actual Roman practice, which could be very variable, though always aiming at balance and harmony. Following a Hellenistic trend, the Corinthian order and its variant the Composite order were most common in surviving Roman temples, but for small temples like that at Alcántara, a simple Tuscan order could be used.

There was considerable local variation in style, as Roman architects often tried to incorporate elements the population expected in its sacred architecture. This was especially the case in Egypt and the Near East, where different traditions of large stone temples were already millennia old. The Romano-Celtic temple was a simple style for small temples found in the Western Empire, and by far the most common type in Roman Britain. It often lacked any of the distinctive classical features, and may have had considerable continuity with pre-Roman temples of the Celtic religion.

=== Theatres ===
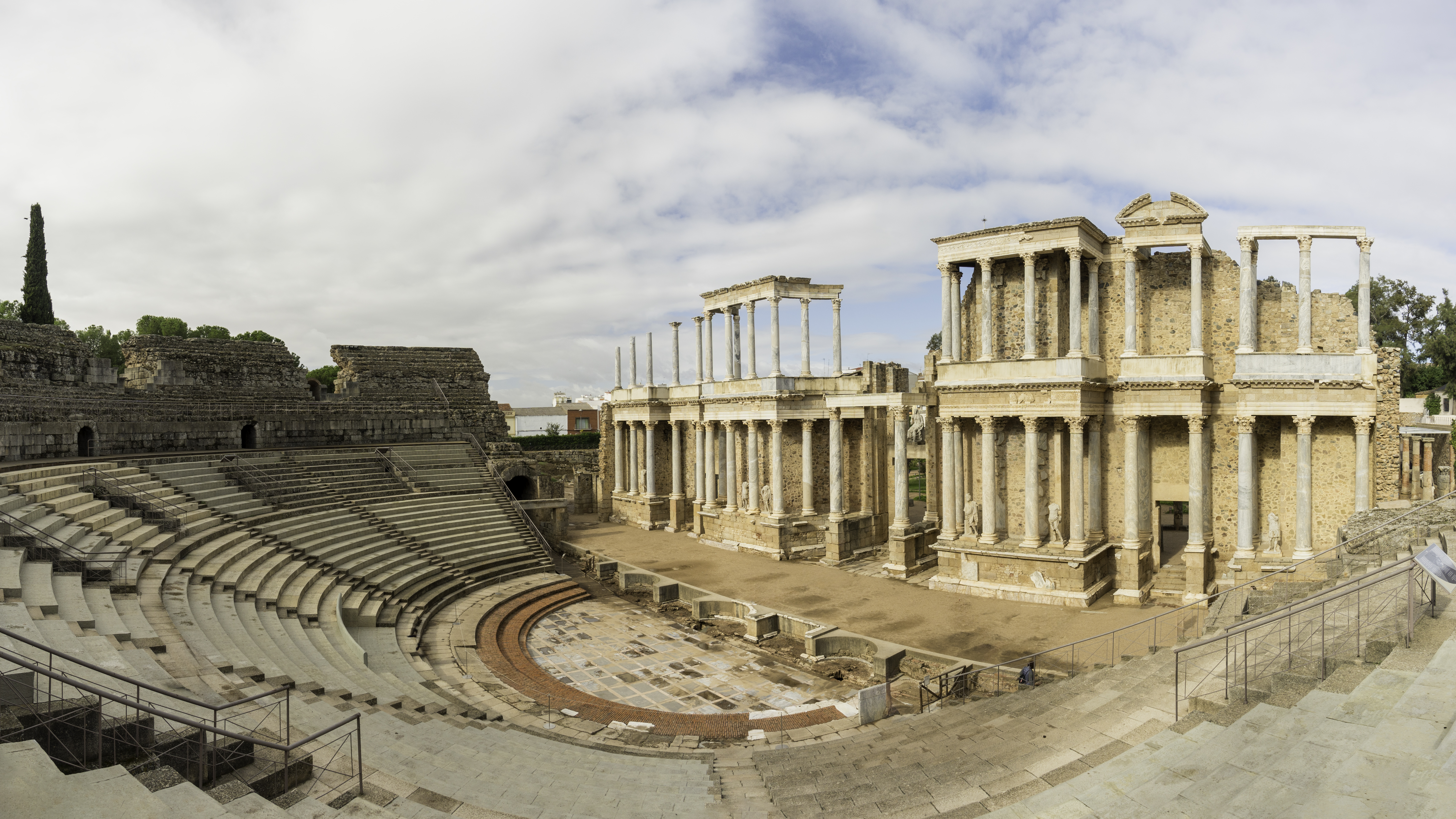
Roman Theatre of Mérida, Spain

Roman theatres were built in all areas of the Empire, from Spain to the Middle East. Because of the Romans' ability to influence local architecture, numerous theatres were built around the world with uniquely Roman attributes.

These buildings were semi-circular and possessed certain inherent architectural structures, with minor differences depending on the region in which they were constructed. The scaenae frons was a high back wall of the stage floor, supported by columns. The proscaenium was a wall that supported the front edge of the stage with ornately decorated niches to the sides. The Hellenistic influence is seen through the use of the proscaenium. The Roman theatre also had a podium, which sometimes supported the columns of the scaenae frons. The scaenae was originally not part of the building itself, constructed only to provide sufficient background for the actors. Eventually, it became a part of the edifice itself, made out of concrete. The theatre itself was divided into the stage (orchestra) and the seating section (auditorium). Vomitoria or entrances and exits were made available to the audience.

=== Villa ===
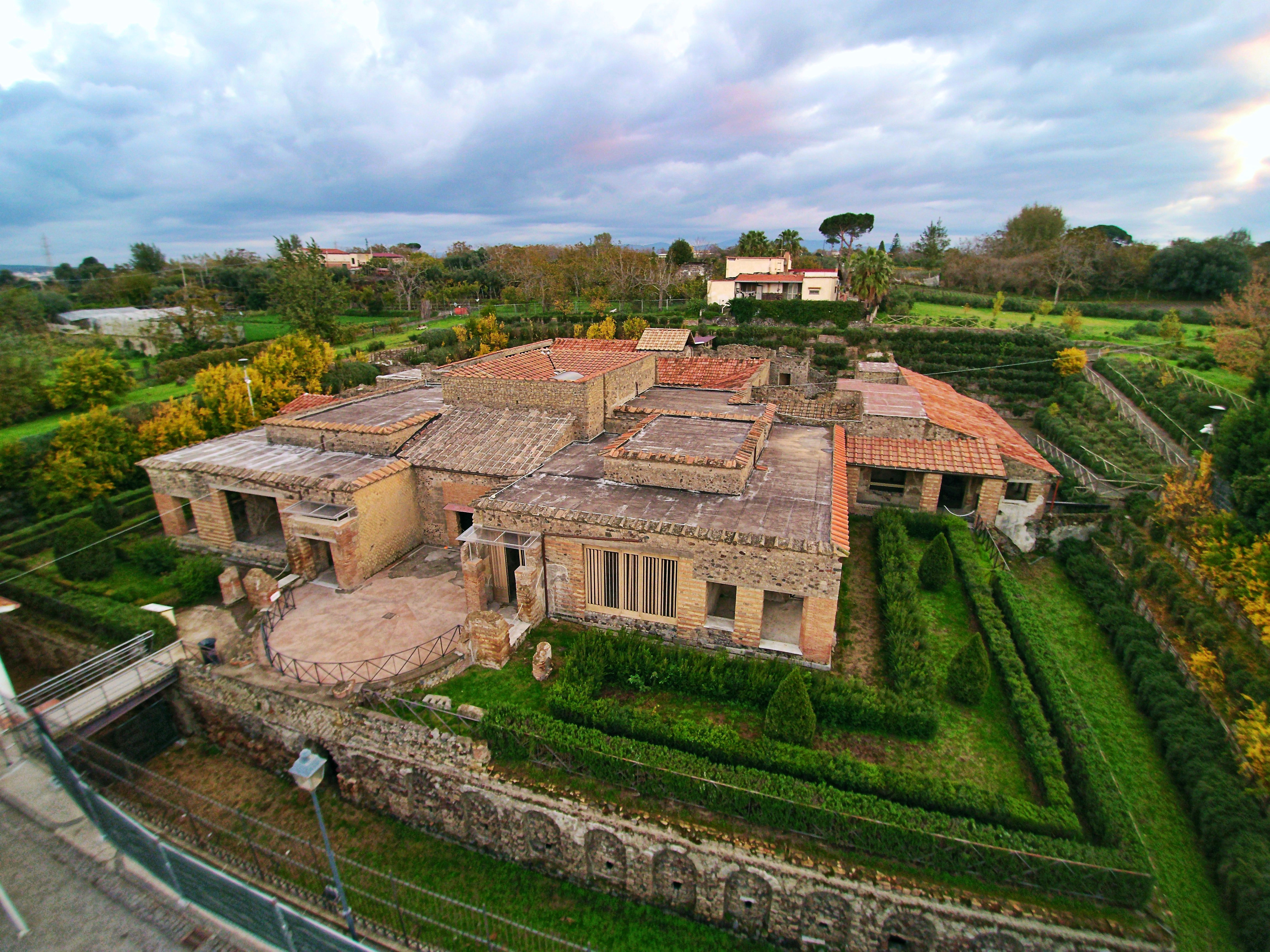
Villa of the Mysteries just outside Pompeii, seen from above

A Roman villa was a country house built for the upper class, while a domus was a wealthy family's house in a town. The Empire contained many kinds of villas, not all of them lavishly appointed with mosaic floors and frescoes. In the provinces, any country house with some decorative features in the Roman style may be called a "villa" by modern scholars. Some, like Hadrian's Villa at Tivoli, were pleasure palaces such as those that were situated in the cool hills within easy reach of Rome or, like the Villa of the Papyri at Herculaneum, on picturesque sites overlooking the Bay of Naples. Some villas were more like the country houses of England, the visible seat of power of a local magnate, such as the famous palace rediscovered at Fishbourne in Sussex.

Suburban villas on the edge of cities were also known, such as the Middle and Late Republican villas that encroached on the Campus Martius, at that time on the edge of Rome, and that can be also seen outside the city walls of Pompeii, including the Villa of the Mysteries, known for its frescos. These early suburban villas, such as the one at Rome's Auditorium site or at Grottarossa in Rome, demonstrate the antiquity and heritage of the villa suburbana in Central Italy. It is possible that these early, suburban villas were also in fact the seats of power (maybe even palaces) of regional strongmen or heads of important families (gentes).

A third type of villa provided the organizational center of the large farming estates called latifundia; such villas might be lacking in luxuries. By the 4th century, villa could simply mean an agricultural estate or holding; Jerome translated the Gospel of Mark (xiv, 32) chorion, describing the olive grove of Gethsemane, with villa, without an inference that there were any dwellings there (Catholic Encyclopedia "Gethsemane").

With the colossal Diocletian's Palace, built in the countryside but later turned into a fortified city, a form of residential castle emerges, that anticipates the Middle Ages.

=== Watermills ===
The initial invention of the watermill appears to have occurred in the Hellenized eastern Mediterranean in the wake of the conquests of Alexander the Great and the rise of Hellenistic science and technology. In the subsequent Roman era, the use of water-power was diversified and different types of watermills were introduced. These include all three variants of the vertical water wheel as well as the horizontal water wheel. Apart from its main use in grinding flour, water-power was also applied to pounding grain, crushing ore, sawing stones and possibly fulling and bellows for iron furnaces.

== Decorative structures ==
=== Monoliths ===
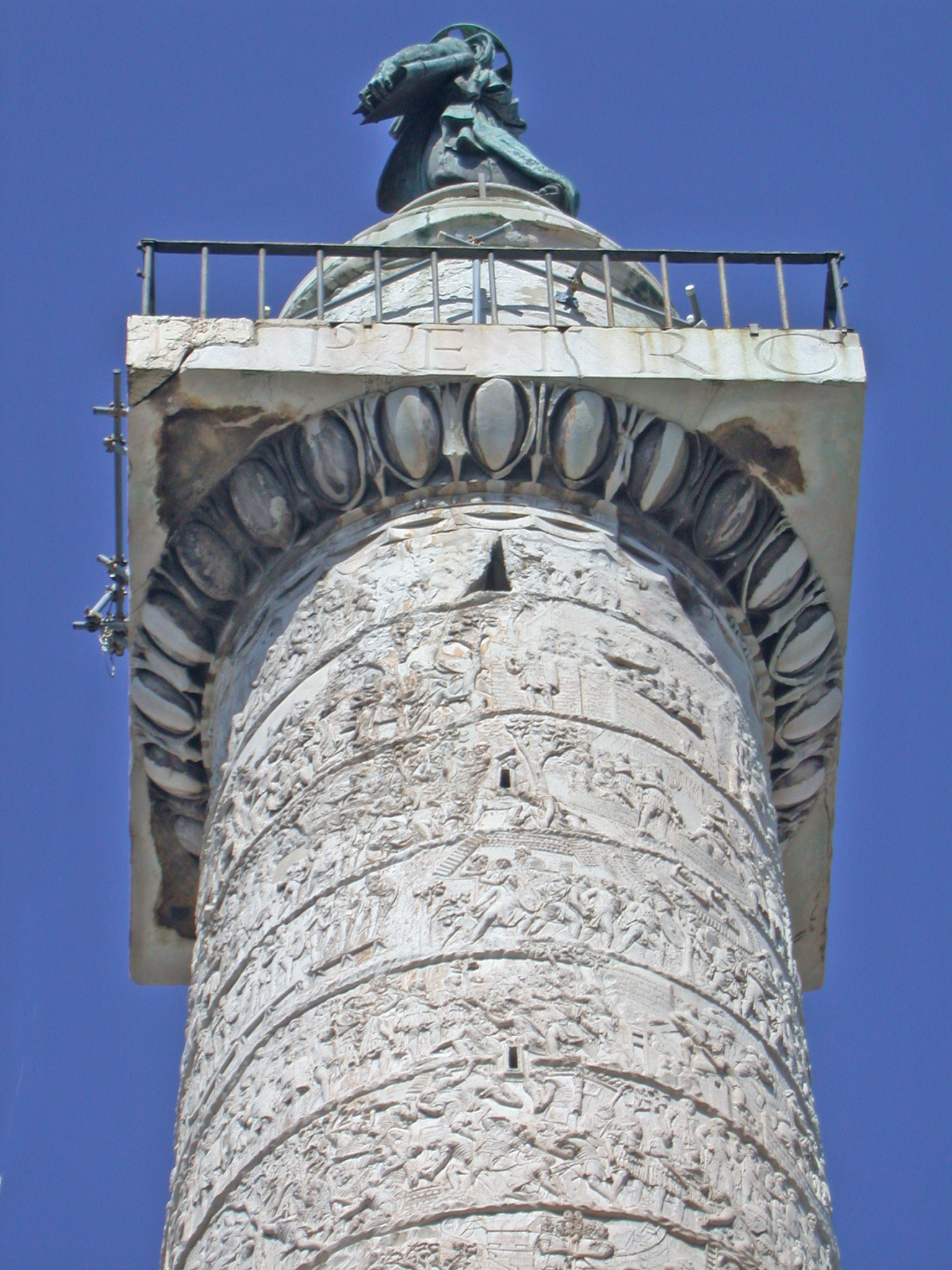
The capital of Trajan's Column, Rome

In architecture, a monolith is a structure that has been excavated as a unit from a surrounding matrix or outcropping of rock. Monoliths are found in all types of Roman buildings. They were either: quarried without being moved, quarried and moved, or quarried, moved and lifted clear off the ground into their position (e.g., architraves); or quarried, moved and erected in an upright position (e.g., columns).

Transporting was done by land or water (or a combination of both), in the later case often by special-built ships such as obelisk carriers. For lifting operations, ancient cranes were employed since c. 515 BC, such as in the construction of Trajan's Column.

=== Obelisks ===
An obelisk is a tall, four-sided, narrow tapering monument that ends in a pyramid-like shape at the top. These were originally called "tekhenu" by the ancient Egyptian builders. The Greeks who saw them used the Greek 'obeliskos' to describe them, and this word passed into Latin and then English. The Romans commissioned obelisks in an ancient Egyptian style. Examples include:

- Arles, France – the Arles Obelisk, in Place de la République, a 4th-century obelisk of Roman origin
- Benevento, Italy – three Roman obelisks
- Munich, Naples and Palestrina – Titus Sextius Africanus obelisks, Staatliches Museum Ägyptischer Kunst, Naples Archaeological Museum Museo archeologico nazionale di Palestrina, 1st century AD, 5.80 m
- Rome – there are five ancient Roman obelisks in Rome.

=== Roman gardens ===
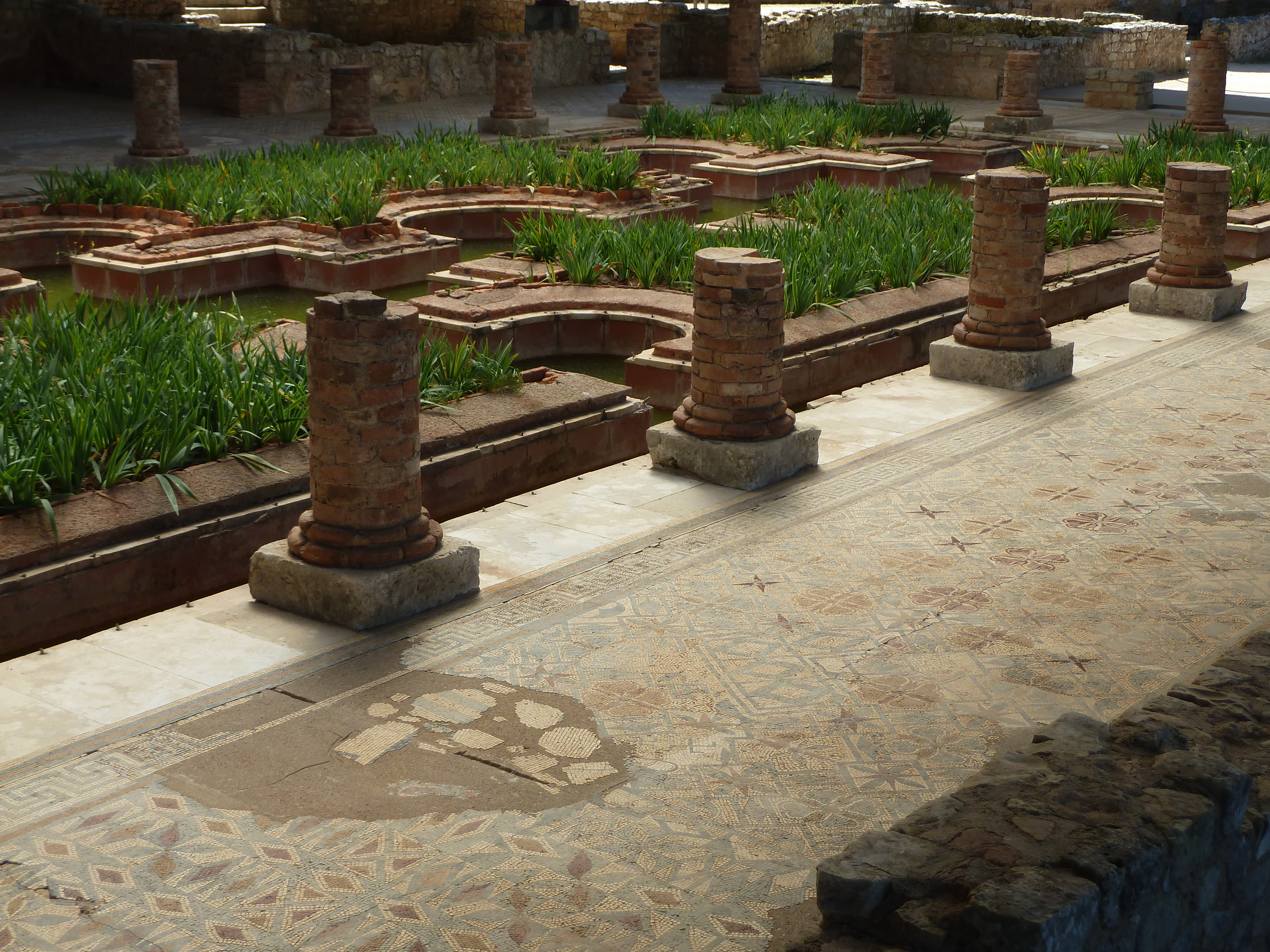
Gardens in Conimbriga, Portugal

Roman gardens were influenced by Egyptian, Persian, and Greek gardening techniques. In Ancient Latium, a garden was part of every farm. According to Cato the Elder, every garden should be close to the house and should have flower beds and ornamental trees. Horace wrote that during his time flower gardens became a national indulgence.

Gardens were not reserved for the extremely wealthy. Excavations in Pompeii show that gardens attaching to residences were scaled down to meet the space constraints of the home of the average Roman. Modified versions of Roman garden designs were adopted in Roman settlements in Africa, Gaul, and Britannia. As town houses were replaced by tall insulae (apartment buildings), these urban gardens were replaced by window boxes or roof gardens.

=== Triumphal arches ===
A triumphal arch is a monumental structure in the shape of an archway with one or more arched passageways, often designed to span a road. The origins of the Roman triumphal arch are unclear, other than in the temporary structures, whose appearance is unknown, erected for Roman triumphs under the Roman Republic, and later. There were precursors to the permanent triumphal arch within the Roman world; in Italy, the Etruscans used elaborately decorated single bay arches as gates or portals to their cities. Surviving examples of Etruscan arches can still be seen at Perugia and Volterra. The two key elements of the triumphal arch – a round-topped arch and a square entablature – had long been in use as separate architectural elements in ancient Greece.

The innovation of the Romans was to use these elements in a single free-standing structure. The columns became purely decorative elements on the outer face of the arch, while the entablature, liberated from its role as a building support, became the frame for the civic and religious messages that the arch builders wished to convey. Little is known about how the Romans viewed triumphal arches. Pliny the Elder, writing in the first century AD, was the only ancient author to discuss them. He wrote that they were intended to "elevate above the ordinary world" an image of an honoured person usually depicted in the form of a statue with a quadriga.

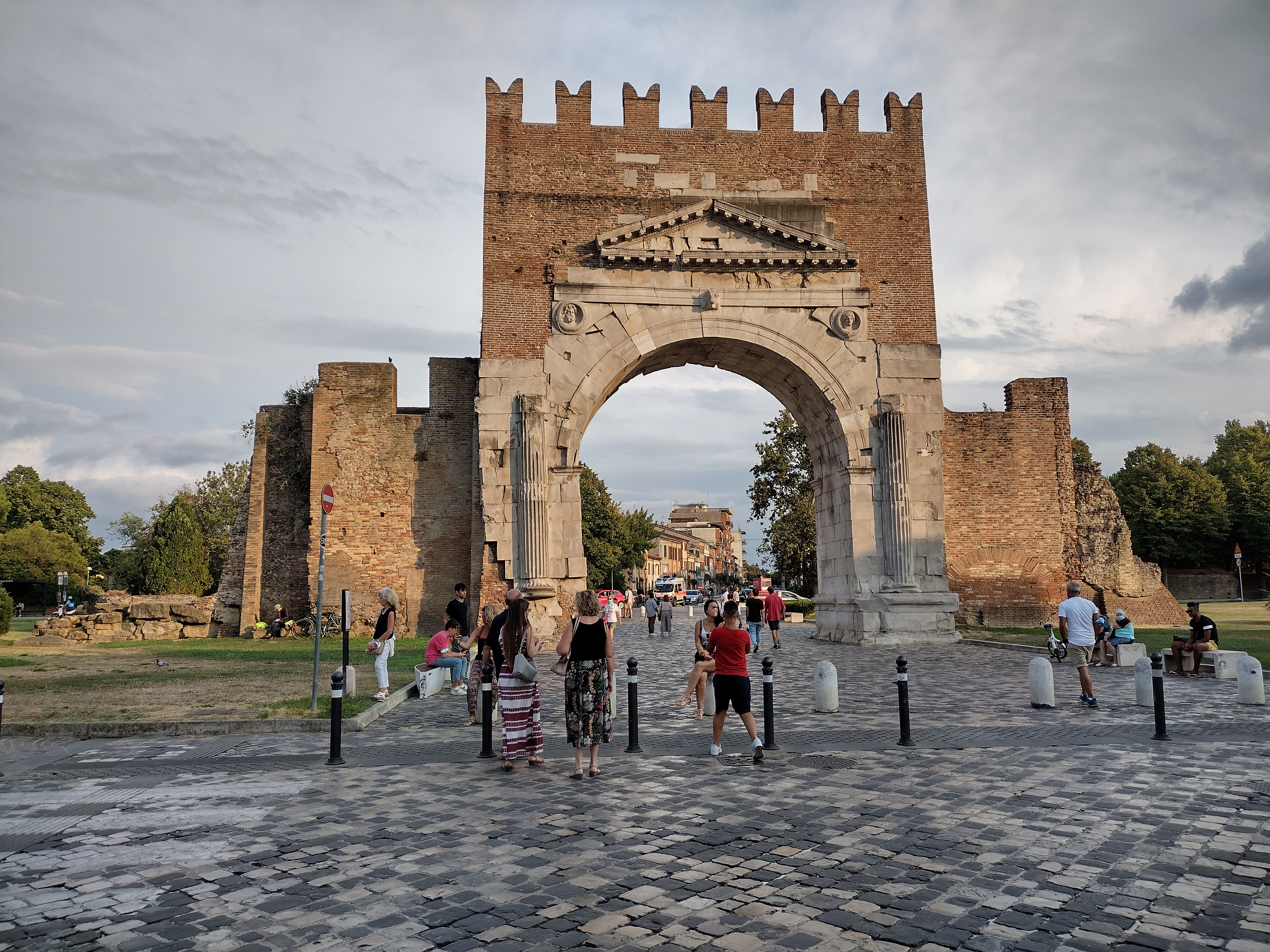
The Arch of Augustus in Rimini (Ariminum), dedicated to Augustus by the Roman Senate in 27 BC, the oldest surviving Roman triumphal arch

The first recorded Roman triumphal arches were set up in the time of the Roman Republic. Generals who were granted a triumph were termed triumphators and would erect fornices or honorific arches bearing statues to commemorate their victories. Roman triumphal practices changed significantly at the start of the Imperial period, when the first Roman Emperor Augustus decreed that only emperors would be granted triumphs. The triumphal arch changed from being a personal monument to being an essentially propagandistic one, serving to announce and promote the presence of the ruler and the laws of the state. Arches were not necessarily built as entrances, but – unlike many modern triumphal arches – they were often erected across roads and were intended to be passed through, not round.

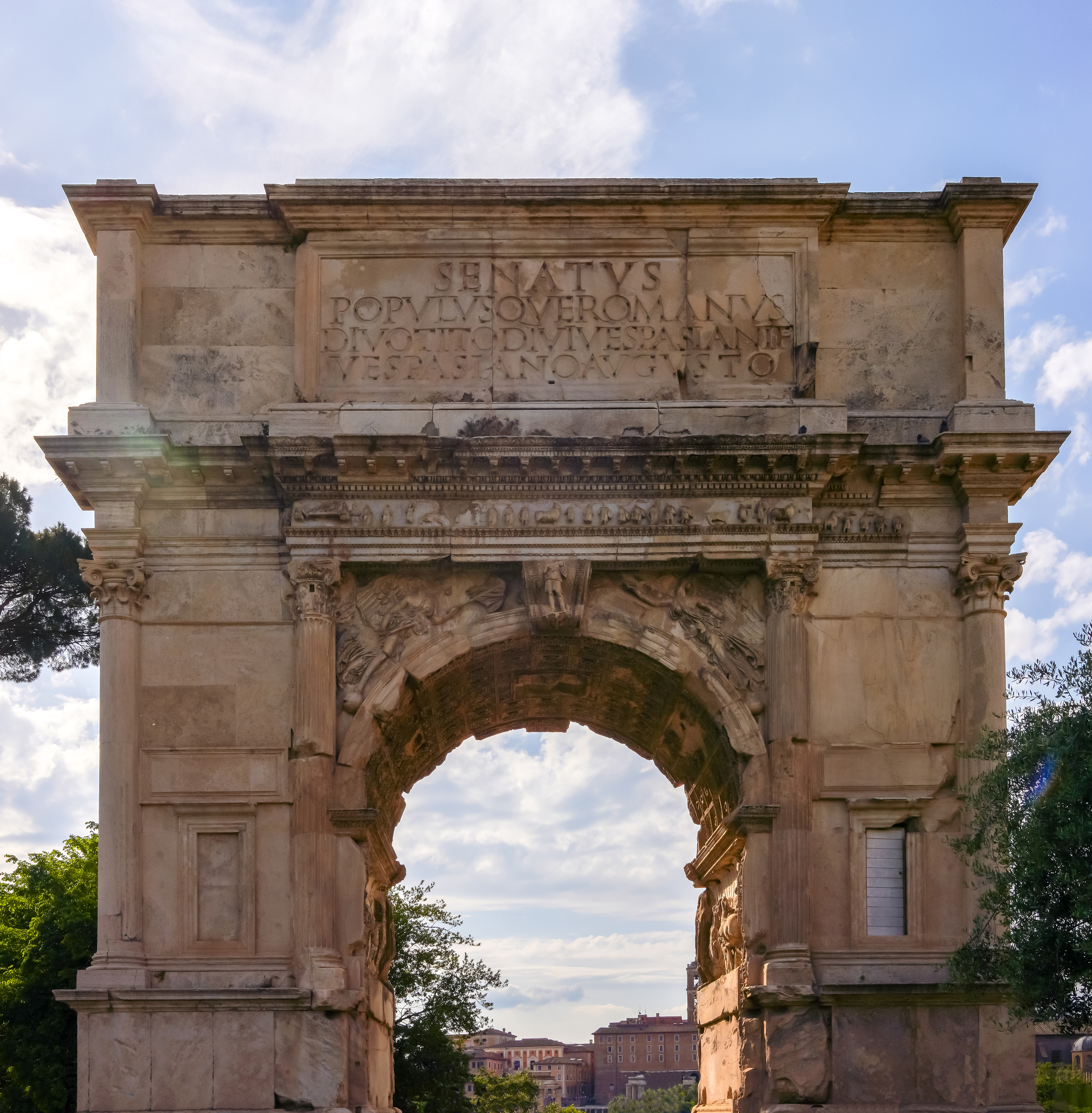
The Arch of Titus in Rome, an early Roman imperial triumphal arch with a single archway

Most Roman triumphal arches were built during the Imperial period. By the fourth century AD there were 36 such arches in Rome, of which three have survived – the Arch of Titus (AD 81), the Arch of Septimius Severus (203–205) and the Arch of Constantine (312). Numerous arches were built elsewhere in the Roman Empire. The single arch was the most common, but many triple arches were also built, of which the Triumphal Arch of Orange (c. AD 21) is the earliest surviving example. From the 2nd century AD, many examples of the arcus quadrifrons – a square triumphal arch erected over a crossroads, with arched openings on all four sides – were built, especially in North Africa. Arch-building in Rome and Italy diminished after the time of Trajan (AD 98–117) but remained widespread in the provinces during the 2nd and 3rd centuries AD; they were often erected to commemorate imperial visits.

The ornamentation of an arch was intended to serve as a constant visual reminder of the triumph and triumphator. The façade was ornamented with marble columns, and the piers and attics with decorative cornices. Sculpted panels depicted victories and achievements, the deeds of the triumphator, the captured weapons of the enemy or the triumphal procession itself. The spandrels usually depicted flying Victories, while the attic was often inscribed with a dedicatory inscription naming and praising the triumphator. The piers and internal passageways were also decorated with reliefs and free-standing sculptures. The vault was ornamented with coffers. Some triumphal arches were surmounted by a statue or a currus triumphalis, a group of statues depicting the emperor or general in a quadriga.

Inscriptions on Roman triumphal arches were works of art in themselves, with very finely cut, sometimes gilded letters. The form of each letter and the spacing between them was carefully designed for maximum clarity and simplicity, without any decorative flourishes, emphasizing the Roman taste for restraint and order. This conception of what later became the art of typography remains of fundamental importance to the present day.

== Infrastructure ==
=== Roads ===
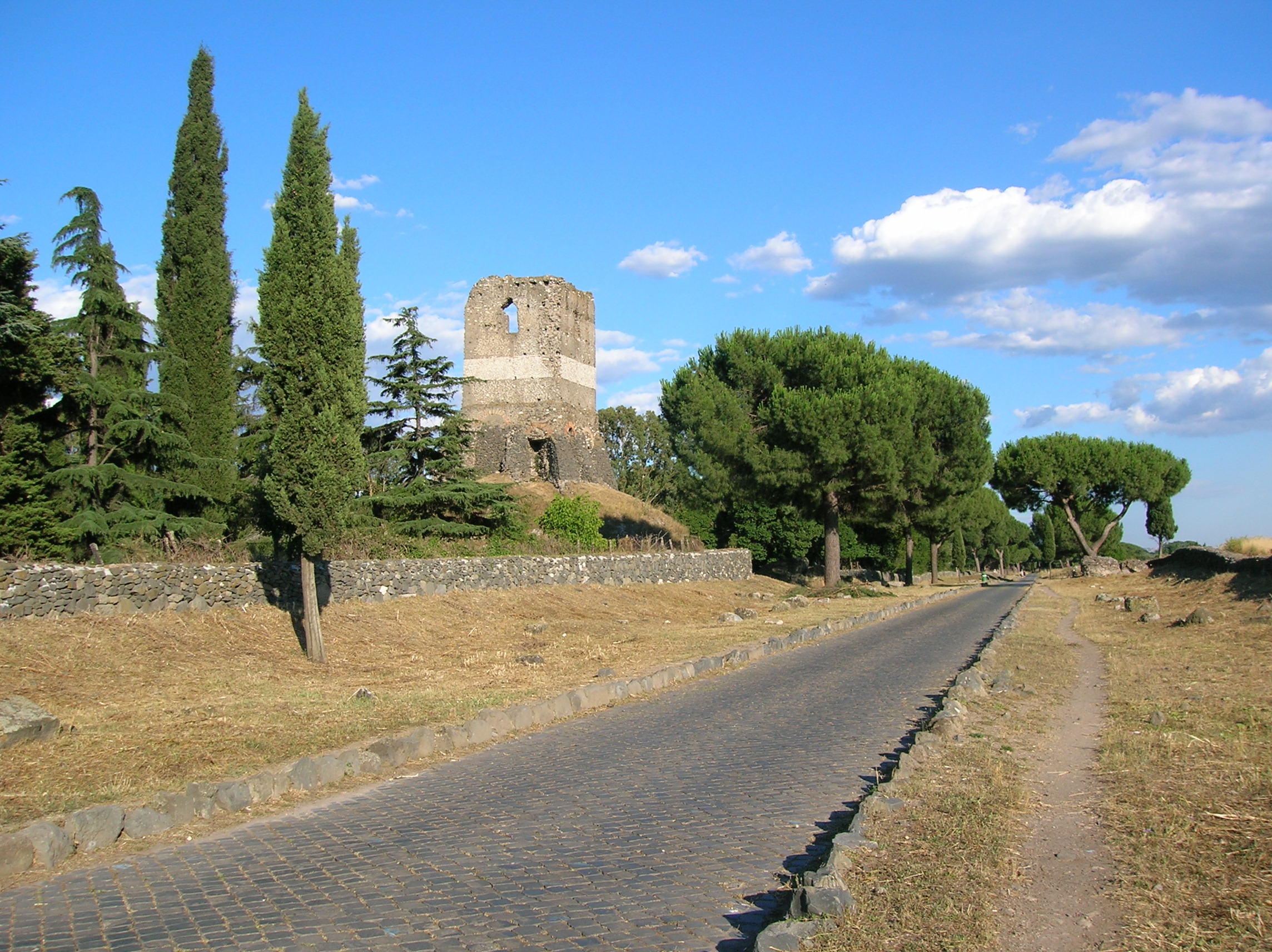
The Appian Way

Roman roads were vital to the maintenance and development of the Roman state, and were built from about 500 BC through the expansion and consolidation of the Roman Republic and the Roman Empire. They provided efficient means for the overland movement of armies, officials and civilians, and the inland carriage of official communications and trade goods. At the peak of Rome's development, no fewer than 29 great military highways radiated from the capital, and the Late Empire's 113 provinces were interconnected by 372 great road links. Roman road builders aimed at a regulation width (see Laws and standards above), but actual widths have been measured at between 3.6 ft (1.1 m) and more than 23 ft (7.0 m). Today, the concrete has worn from the spaces around the stones, giving the impression of a very bumpy road, but the original practice was to produce a surface that was much closer to being flat.

=== Aqueduct ===
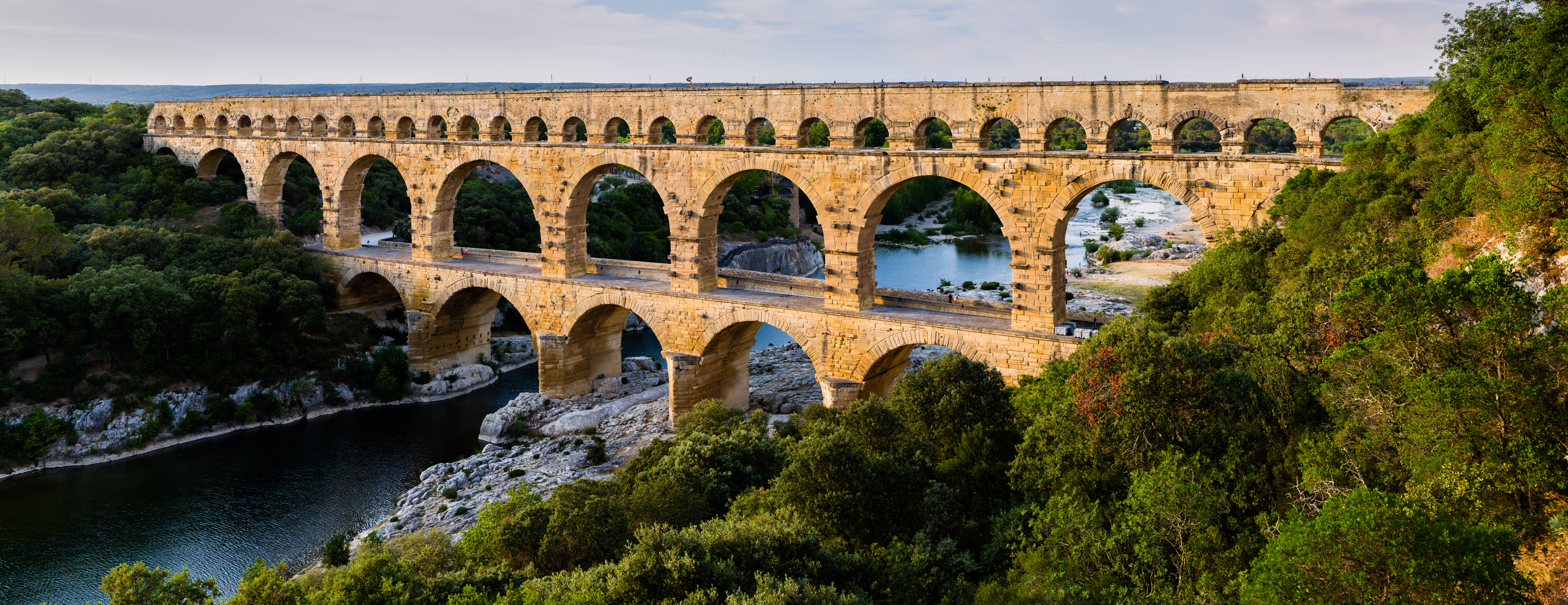
The Pont du Gard, near Vers-Pont-du-Gard, France

The Romans constructed numerous aqueducts in order to bring water from distant sources into their cities and towns, supplying public baths, latrines, fountains and private households. Waste water was removed by complex sewage systems and released into nearby bodies of water, keeping the towns clean and free from efflvia. Aqueducts also provided water for mining operations, milling, farms and gardens.

Aqueducts moved water by gravity alone, being constructed along a slight downward gradient within conduits of stone, brick or concrete. Most were buried beneath the ground, and followed its contours; obstructing peaks were circumvented or, less often, tunnelled through. Where valleys or lowlands intervened, the conduit was carried on bridgework, or its contents fed into high-pressure lead, ceramic or stone pipes and siphoned across. Most aqueduct systems included sedimentation tanks, sluices and distribution tanks to regulate the supply as needed.

Ancient Rome's first aqueduct – the Aqua Appia – supplied a water-fountain sited at the city's cattle market in the fourth century BC. By the third century AD, the city had eleven aqueducts, sustaining a population of over a million people in a water-extravagant economy; most of the water supplied the city's many public baths. Cities and municipalities throughout the Roman Empire emulated this model and funded aqueducts as objects of public interest and civic pride, "an expensive yet necessary luxury to which all could, and did, aspire."

Most Roman aqueducts proved reliable, and durable; some were maintained into the early modern era, and a few are still partly in use. Methods of aqueduct surveying and construction are noted by Vitruvius in his work De architectura (1st century BC). The general Frontinus gives more detail in his official report on the problems, uses and abuses of Imperial Rome's public water supply. Notable examples of aqueduct architecture include the supporting piers of the Aqueduct of Segovia, and the aqueduct-fed cisterns of Constantinople.

=== Bridges ===
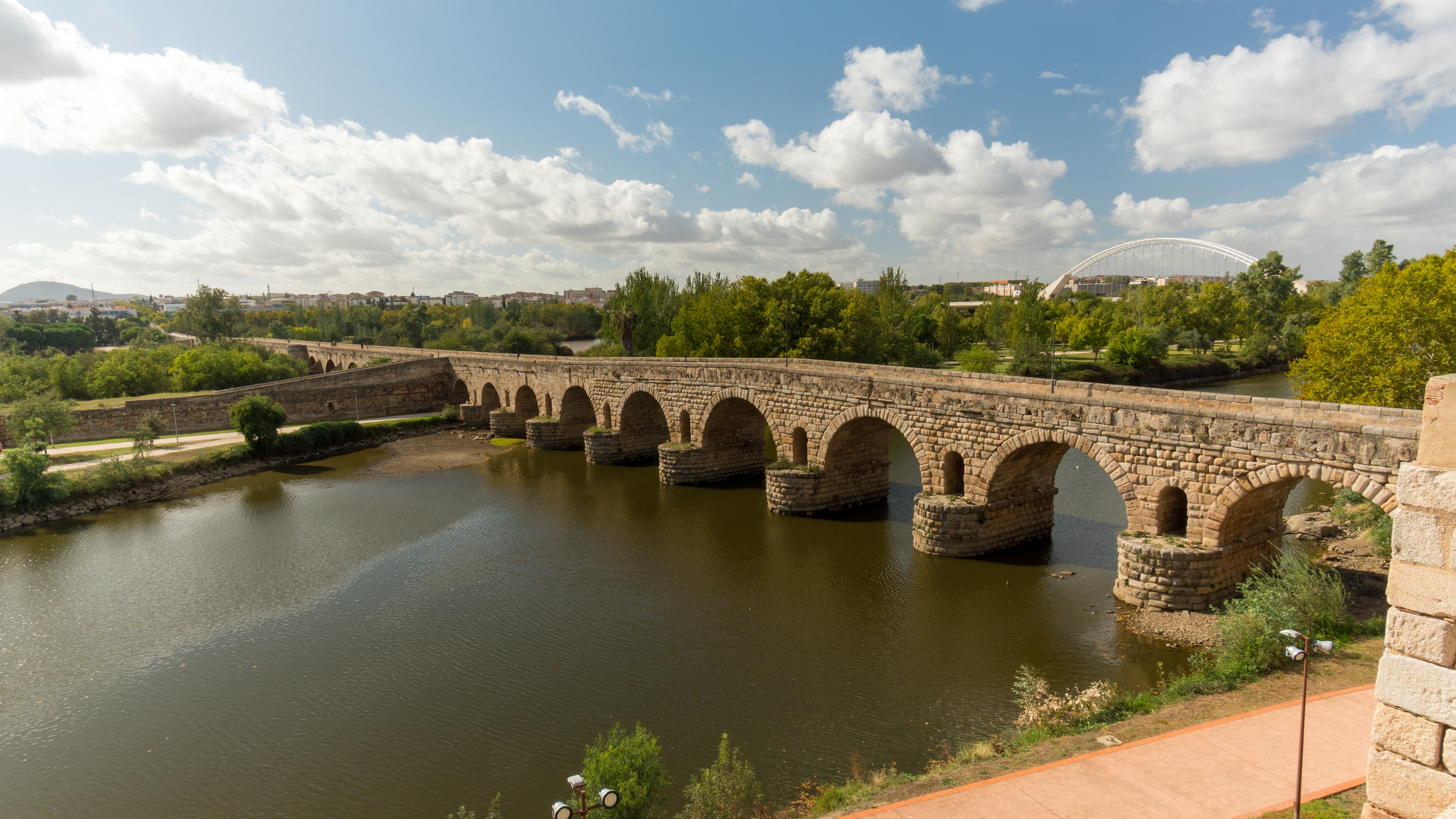
Puente Romano over the Guadiana River at Mérida, Spain

Roman bridges, built by ancient Romans, were the first large and lasting bridges built. Roman bridges were built with stone and had the arch as the basic structure. Most used concrete as well, which the Romans were the first to use for bridges.

Roman arch bridges were usually semicircular, although a few were segmental (such as Alconétar Bridge). A segmental arch is an arch that is less than a semicircle. The advantages of the segmental arch bridge were that it allowed great amounts of flood water to pass under it, which would prevent the bridge from being swept away during floods and the bridge itself could be more lightweight. Generally, Roman bridges featured wedge-shaped primary arch stones (voussoirs) of the same in size and shape. The Romans built both single spans and lengthy multiple arch aqueducts, such as the Pont du Gard and Segovia Aqueduct. Their bridges featured from an early time onwards flood openings in the piers, e.g. in the Pons Fabricius in Rome (62 BC), one of the world's oldest major bridges still standing. Roman engineers were the first and until the Industrial Revolution the only ones to construct bridges with concrete, which they called opus caementicium. The outside was usually covered with brick or ashlar, as in the Alcántara bridge.

The Romans also introduced segmental arch bridges into bridge construction. The 330 m long Limyra Bridge in southwestern Turkey features 26 segmental arches with an average span-to-rise ratio of 5.3:1, giving the bridge an unusually flat profile unsurpassed for more than a millennium. Trajan's Bridge over the Danube featured open-spandrel segmental arches made of wood (standing on 40 m high concrete piers). This was to be the longest arch bridge for a thousand years both in terms of overall and individual span length, while the longest extant Roman bridge is the 790 m long Puente Romano at Mérida.

=== Canals ===
Roman canals were typically multi-purpose structures, intended for irrigation, drainage, land reclamation, flood control and navigation where feasible. Some navigational canals were recorded by ancient geographers and are still traceable by modern archaeology. Channels, which served the needs of urban water supply are covered at the List of aqueducts in the Roman Empire.

=== Cisterns ===
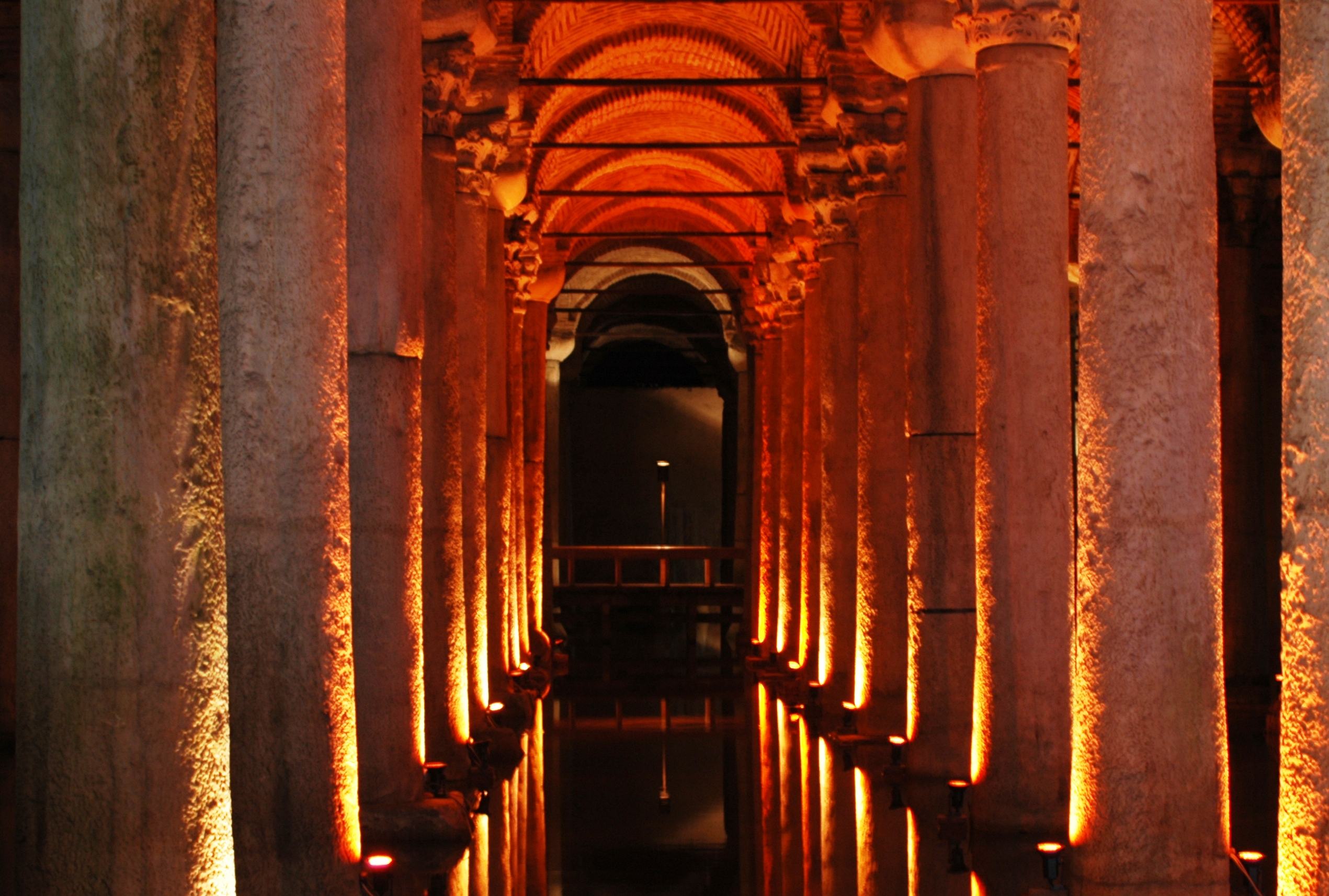
The Basilica Cistern in Constantinople provided water for the Imperial Palace.

Freshwater reservoirs were commonly set up at the termini of aqueducts and their branch lines, supplying urban households, agricultural estates, imperial palaces, thermae or naval bases of the Roman navy.

=== Dams ===
Roman dam construction began in earnest in the early imperial period. For the most part, it concentrated on the semi-arid fringe of the empire, namely the provinces of North Africa, the Near East, and Hispania. The relative abundance of Spanish dams below is due partly to more intensive field work there; for Italy only the Subiaco Dams, created by emperor Nero (54–68 AD) for recreational purposes, are attested. These dams are noteworthy, though, for their extraordinary height, which remained unsurpassed anywhere in the world until the Late Middle Ages.

The most frequent dam types were earth- or rock-filled embankment dams and masonry gravity dams. These served a wide array of purposes, such as irrigation, flood control, river diversion, soil-retention, or a combination of these functions. The impermeability of Roman dams was increased by the introduction of waterproof hydraulic mortar and especially opus caementicium in the Concrete Revolution. These materials also allowed for bigger structures to be built, like the Lake Homs Dam, possibly the largest water barrier today, and the sturdy Harbaqa Dam, both of which consist of a concrete core.

Roman builders were the first to realize the stabilizing effect of arches and buttresses, which they integrated into their dam designs. Previously unknown dam types introduced by the Romans include arch-gravity dams, arch dams, buttress dams, and multiple-arch buttress dams.

=== Defensive walls ===
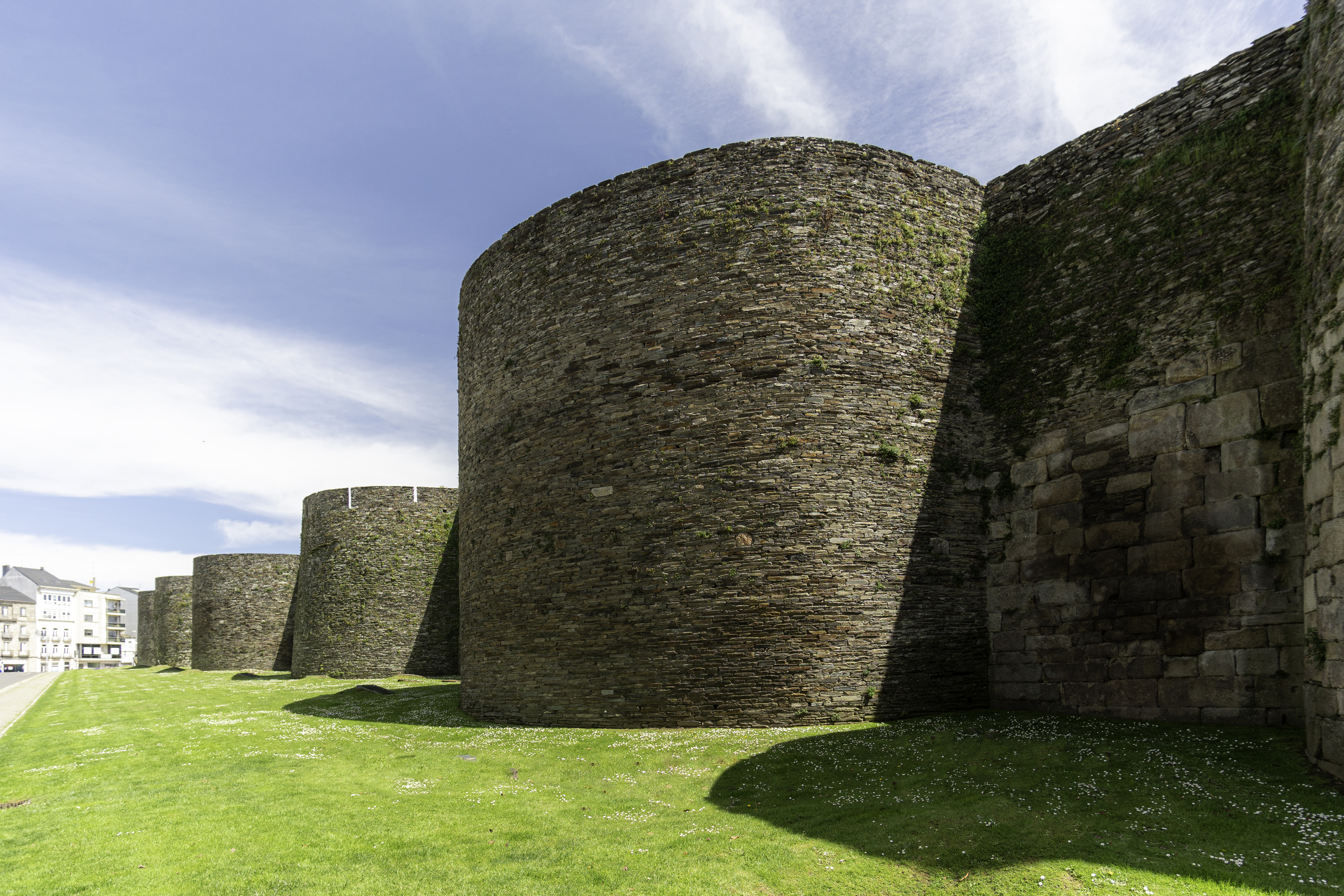
Roman walls of Lugo, Spain

The Romans generally fortified cities rather than fortresses, but there are some fortified camps such as the Saxon Shore forts like Porchester Castle in England. City walls were already significant in Etruscan architecture, and in the struggle for control of Italy under the early Republic many more were built, using different techniques. These included tightly fitting massive irregular polygonal blocks, shaped to fit exactly in a way reminiscent of later Inca work. The Romans called a simple rampart wall an agger; at this date great height was not necessary. The Servian Wall around Rome was an ambitious project of the early 4th century BC. The wall was up to 10 metres (33 feet) in height in places, 3.6 metres (12 feet) wide at its base, 11 km (6.8 mi) long, and is believed to have had 16 main gates, though many of these are mentioned only from writings, with no other known remains. Some of it had a fossa or ditch in front, and an agger behind, and it was enough to deter Hannibal. Later the Aurelian Wall replaced it, enclosing an expanded city, and using more sophisticated designs, with small forts at intervals.

The Romans walled major cities and towns in areas they saw as vulnerable, and parts of many walls remain incorporated in later defensive fortifications, as at Córdoba (2nd century BC), Chester (earth and wood in the 70s AD, stone from c. 100), and York (from 70s AD). Strategic walls across open country were far rarer, and Hadrian's Wall (from 122) and the Antonine Wall (from 142, abandoned only 8 years after completion) are the most significant examples, both on the Pictish frontier of Roman Britain.

== Architectural features ==
=== Mosaics ===
The Centaur mosaic (2nd century), found at Hadrian's Villa in Tivoli, Italy. Altes Museum, Berlin

On his return from campaigns in Greece, the general Sulla brought back what is probably the best-known element of the early imperial period: the mosaic, a decoration made of colourful chips of stone inserted into cement. This tiling method took the empire by storm in the late first century and the second century and in the Roman home joined the well-known mural in decorating floors, walls, and grottoes with geometric and pictorial designs.

There were two main techniques in Greco-Roman mosaic. Opus vermiculatum used tiny tesserae, typically cubes of 4 millimeters or less, and was produced in workshops in relatively small panels, which were transported to the site glued to some temporary support. The tiny tesserae allowed very fine detail and an approach to the illusionism of painting. Often small panels called emblemata were inserted into walls or as the highlights of larger floor-mosaics in coarser work. The normal technique, however, was opus tessellatum, using larger tesserae, which were laid on site. There was a distinct native Italian style using black on a white background, which was no doubt cheaper than fully coloured work.

A specific genre of Roman mosaic obtained the name asaroton (Greek "unswept floor"). It represented an optical illusion of the leftovers from a feast on the floor of rich houses.

=== Hypocaust ===
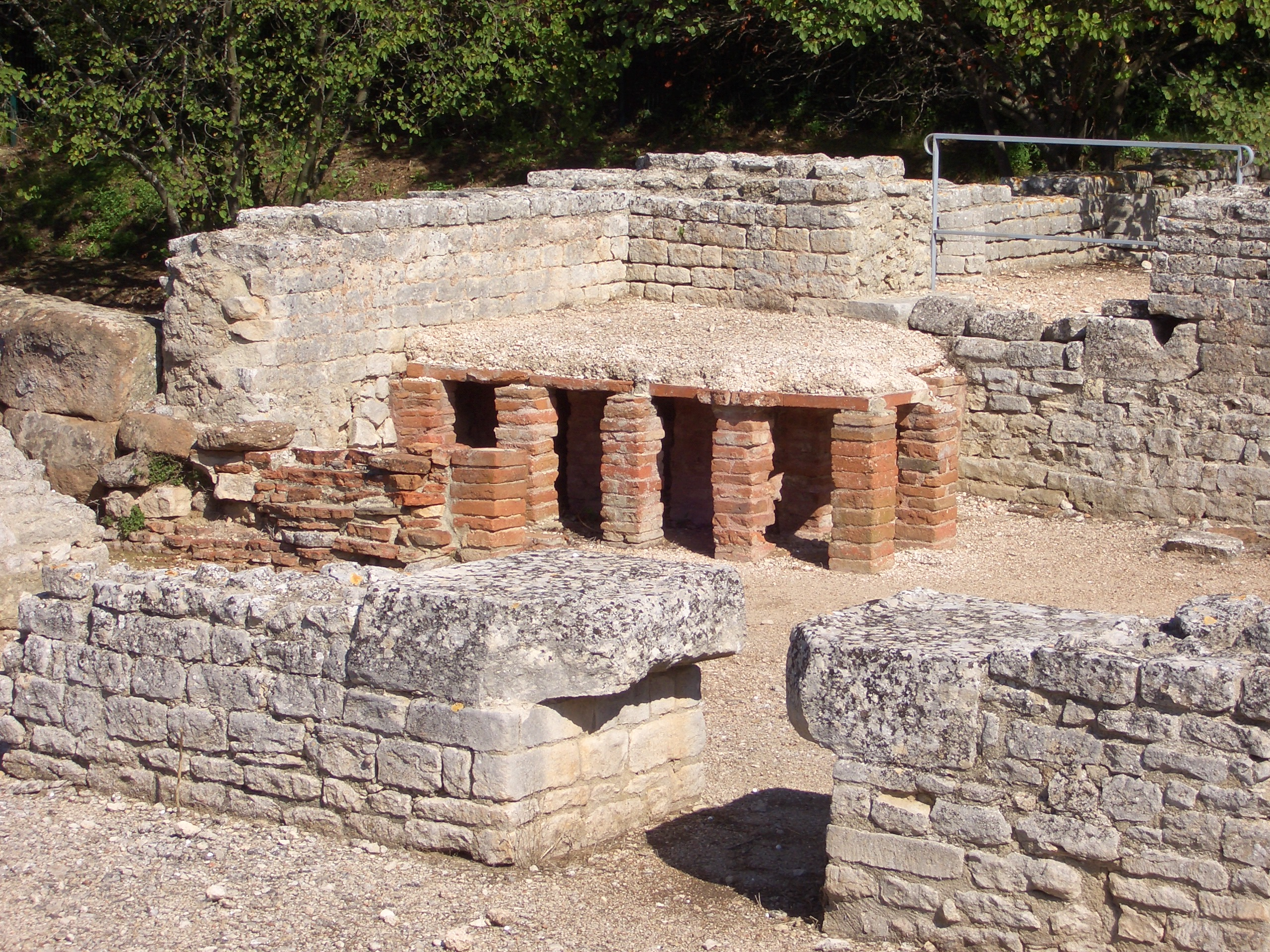
Hypocaust in Saint-Rémy-de-Provence, France

A hypocaust was an ancient Roman system of underfloor heating, used to heat buildings with hot air. The Roman architect Vitruvius, writing about the end of the 1st century BC, attributes their invention to Sergius Orata. Many remains of Roman hypocausts have survived throughout Europe, western Asia, and northern Africa. The hypocaust was an invention which improved the hygiene and living conditions of citizens, and was a forerunner of modern central heating.

Hypocausts were used for heating hot baths (thermae), houses and other buildings, whether public or private. The floor was raised above the ground by pillars, called pilae stacks, with a layer of tiles, then a layer of concrete, then another of tiles on top; and spaces were left inside the walls so that hot air and smoke from the furnace would pass through these enclosed areas and out of flues in the roof, thereby heating but not polluting the interior of the room.

=== Roman roofs ===
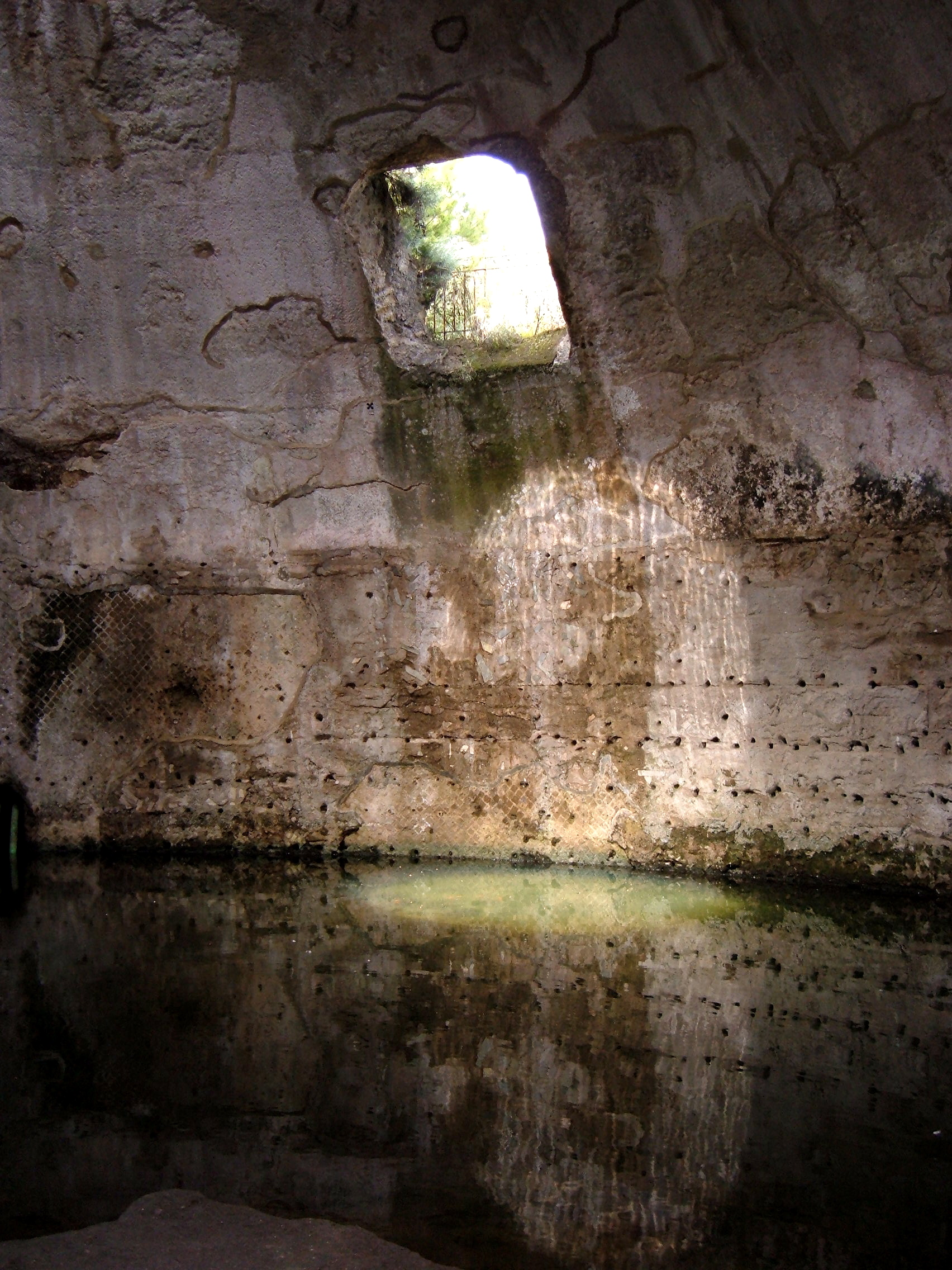
Inside the "Temple of Mercury" at Baiae, a swimming pool for a Roman bath, dating to the late Roman Republic, and containing one of the largest domes in the world before the building of the Pantheon

In Magna Graecia truss roofs presumably appeared as early as 550 BC. Their potential was fully realized in the Roman period, which saw trussed roofs over 30 meters wide spanning the rectangular spaces of monumental public buildings such as temples, basilicas, and later churches. Such spans were three times as wide as the widest prop-and-lintel roofs and only surpassed by the largest Roman domes.

The largest truss roof by span of ancient Rome covered the Aula Regia (throne room) built for emperor Domitian (81–96 AD) on the Palatine Hill, Rome. The timber truss roof had a width of 31.67 m, slightly surpassing the postulated limit of 30 m for Roman roof constructions. Tie-beam trusses allowed for much larger spans than the older prop-and-lintel system and even concrete vaulting. Nine out of the ten largest rectangular spaces in Roman architecture were bridged this way, the only exception being the groin vaulted Basilica of Maxentius.

=== Roman latticework (transeena) ===
The Romans used geometric openwork trellis, grates, and grills, of wood, iron, bronze and stone, to create both railings and infill openings, often windows.

=== Spiral stairs ===
The spiral stair is a type of stairway which, due to its complex helical structure, was introduced relatively late into architecture. Although the oldest example dates to the 5th century BC, it was only in the wake of the influential design of Trajan's Column that this space-saving new type permanently caught hold in Roman architecture.

Apart from the triumphal columns in the imperial cities of Rome and Constantinople, other types of buildings such as temples, thermae, basilicas and tombs were also fitted with spiral stairways. Their notable absence in the towers of the Aurelian Wall indicates that although used in medieval castles, they did not yet figure prominently in Roman military engineering. By late antiquity, separate stair towers were constructed adjacent to the main buildings, as in the Basilica of San Vitale.

The construction of spiral stairs passed on both to Christian and Islamic architecture.

== City design ==
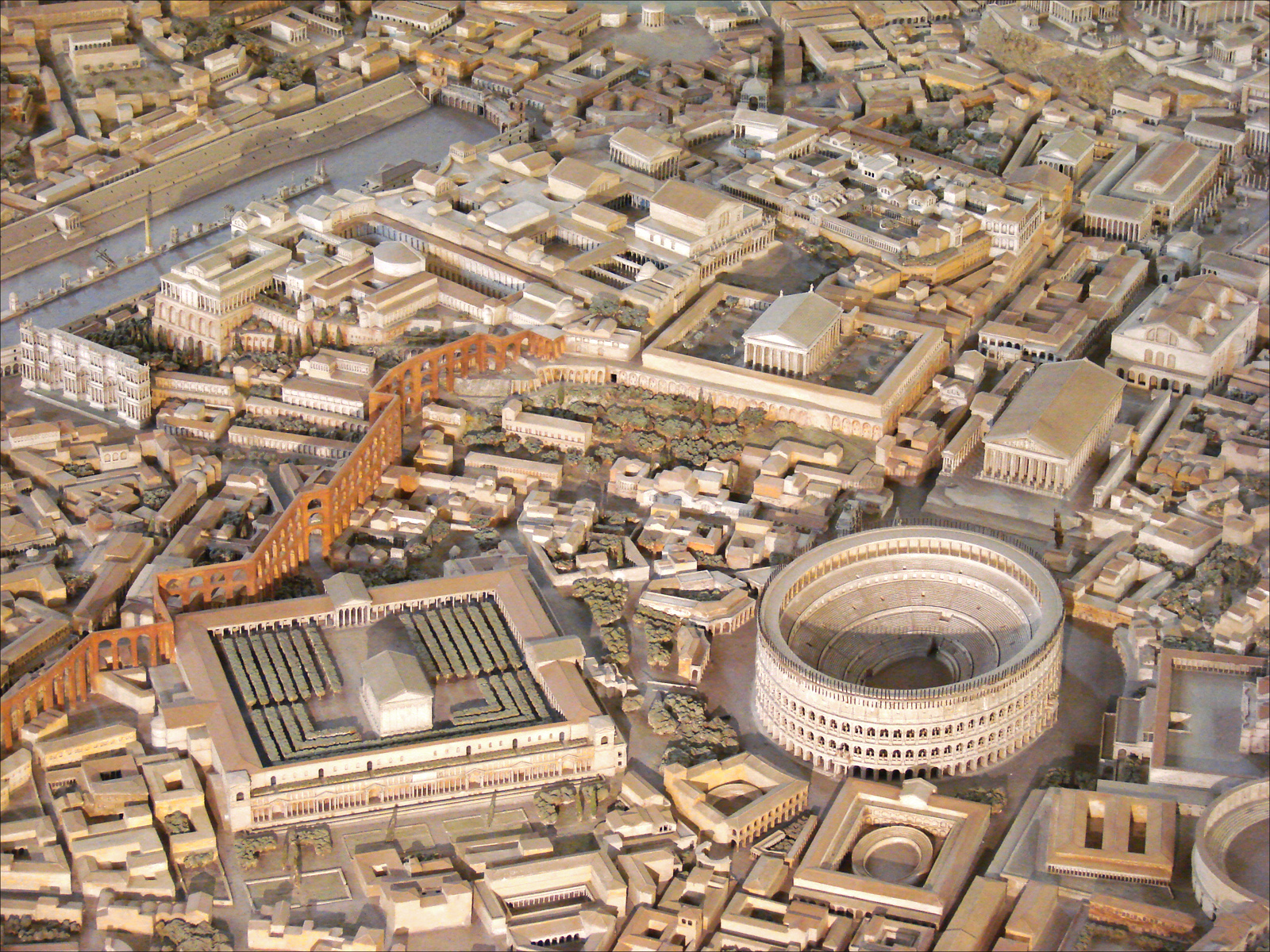
The Temple of Claudius to the south (left) of the Colosseum (model of Imperial Rome at the Museo della civiltà romana in Rome)

The ancient Romans employed regular orthogonal structures on which they molded their colonies. They probably were inspired by Greek and Hellenic examples, as well as by regularly planned cities that were built by the Etruscans in Italy. (see Marzabotto)

The Romans used a consolidated scheme for city planning, developed for military defense and civil convenience. The basic plan consisted of a central forum with city services, surrounded by a compact, rectilinear grid of streets, and wrapped in a wall for defense. To reduce travel times, two diagonal streets crossed the square grid, passing through the central square. A river usually flowed through the city, providing water, transport, and sewage disposal. Hundreds of towns and cities were built by the Romans throughout their Empire.

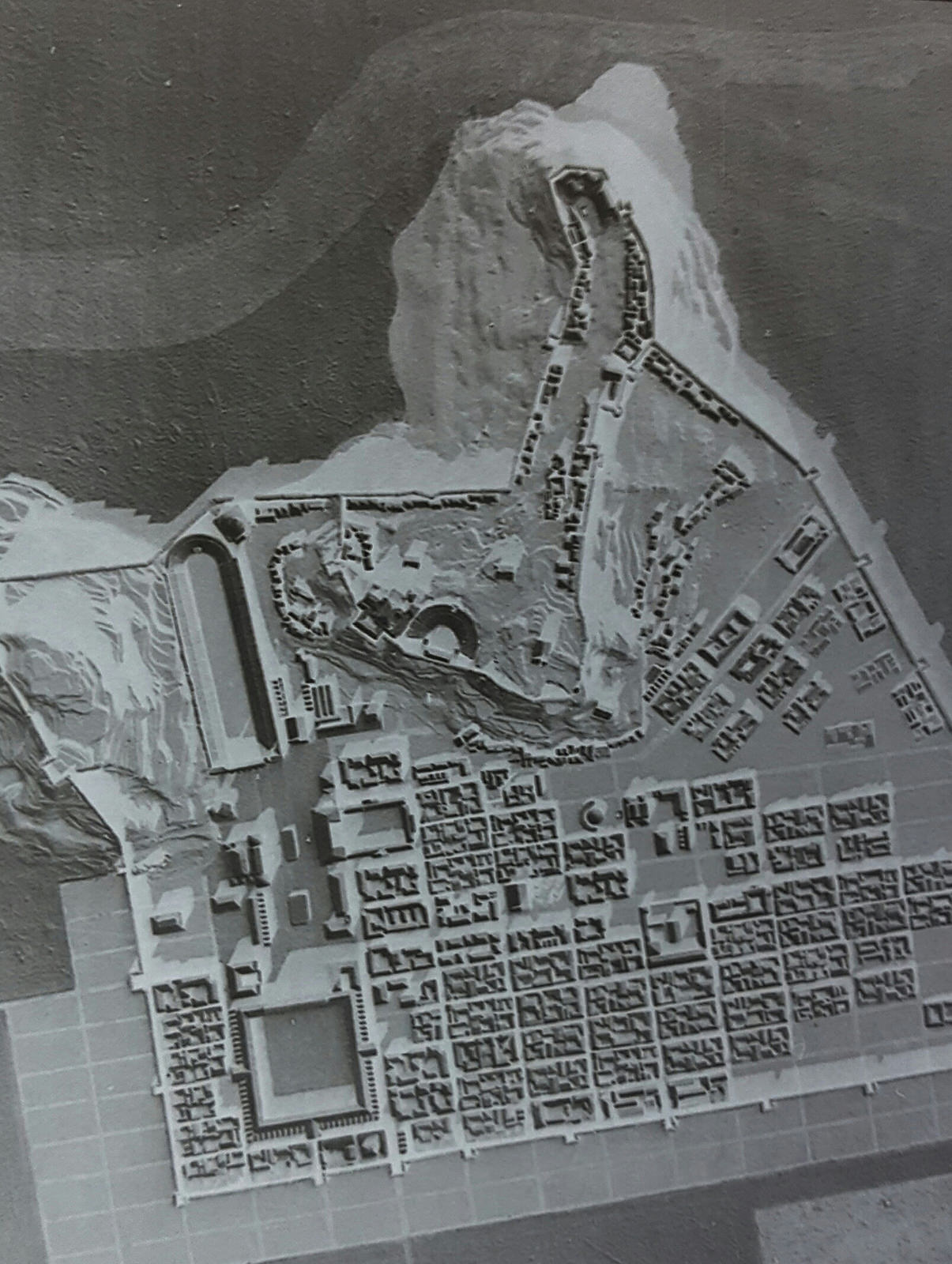
Model of the 1st century Philippopolis (Plovdiv, Bulgaria) in the Roman period created by architect Matey Mateev

Many European towns, such as Turin, preserve the remains of these schemes, which show the very logical way the Romans designed their cities. They would lay out the streets at right angles, in the form of a square grid. All roads were equal in width and length, except for two, which were slightly wider than the others. One of these ran east–west, the other, north–south, and they intersected in the middle to form the center of the grid. All roads were made of carefully fitted flagstones and filled in with smaller, hard-packed rocks and pebbles. Bridges were constructed where needed. Each square marked off by four roads was called an insula, the Roman equivalent of a modern city block. Each insula was 80 yards (73 m) square, with the land within it divided. As the city developed, each insula would eventually be filled with buildings of various shapes and sizes and crisscrossed with back roads and alleys. Most insulae were given to the first settlers of a Roman city, but each person had to pay to construct his own house.

The city was surrounded by a wall to protect it from invaders and to mark the city limits. Areas outside city limits were left open as farmland. At the end of each main road was a large gateway with watchtowers. A portcullis covered the opening when the city was under siege, and additional watchtowers were constructed along the city walls. An aqueduct was built outside the city walls.

The development of Greek and Roman urbanization is well-known, as there are relatively many written sources, and there has been much attention to the subject, since the Romans and Greeks are generally regarded as the main ancestors of modern Western culture. It should not be forgotten, though, that the Etruscans had many considerable towns and there were also other cultures with more or less urban settlements in Europe, primarily of Celtic origin.

== Significant buildings and areas ==
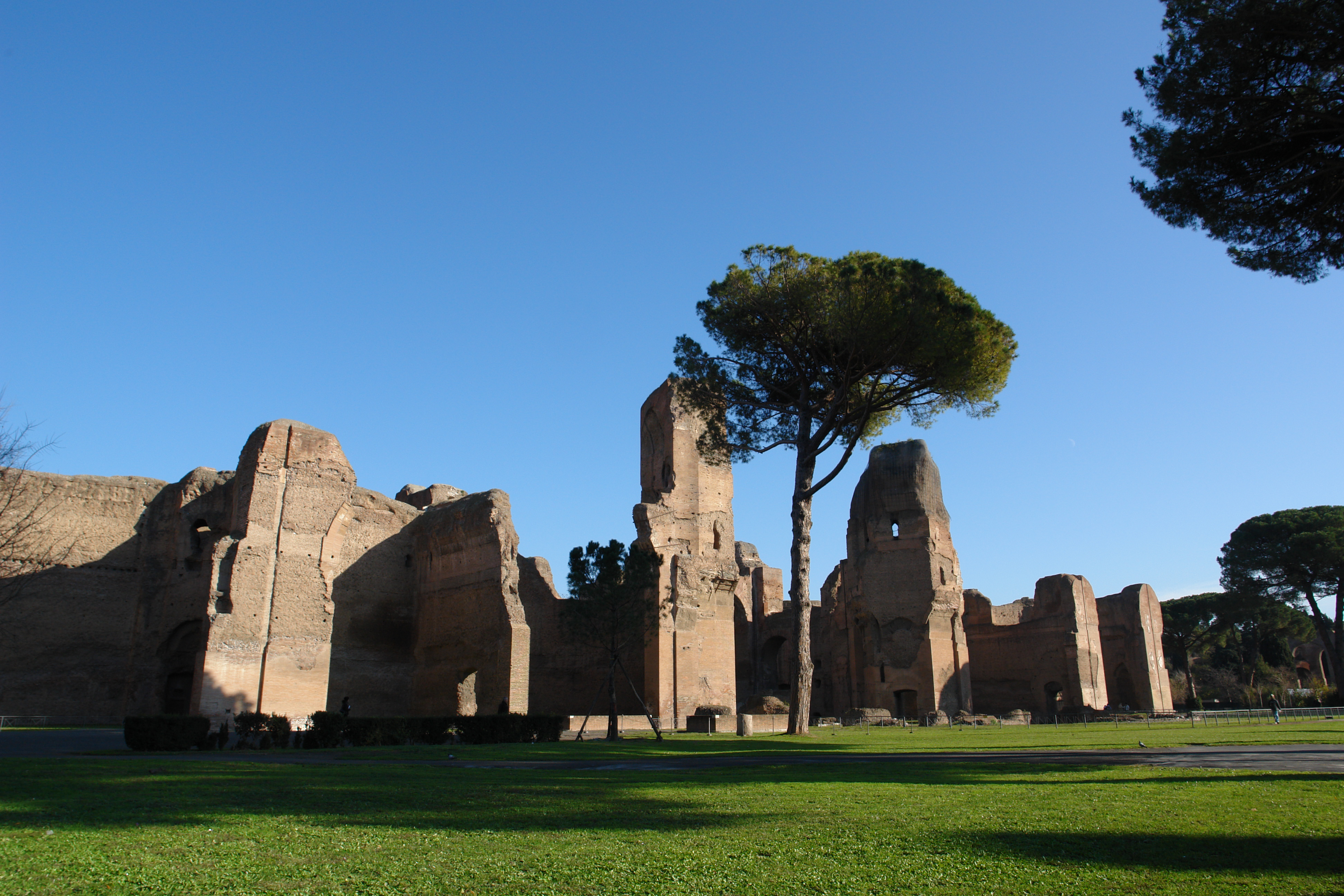
The Baths of Caracalla

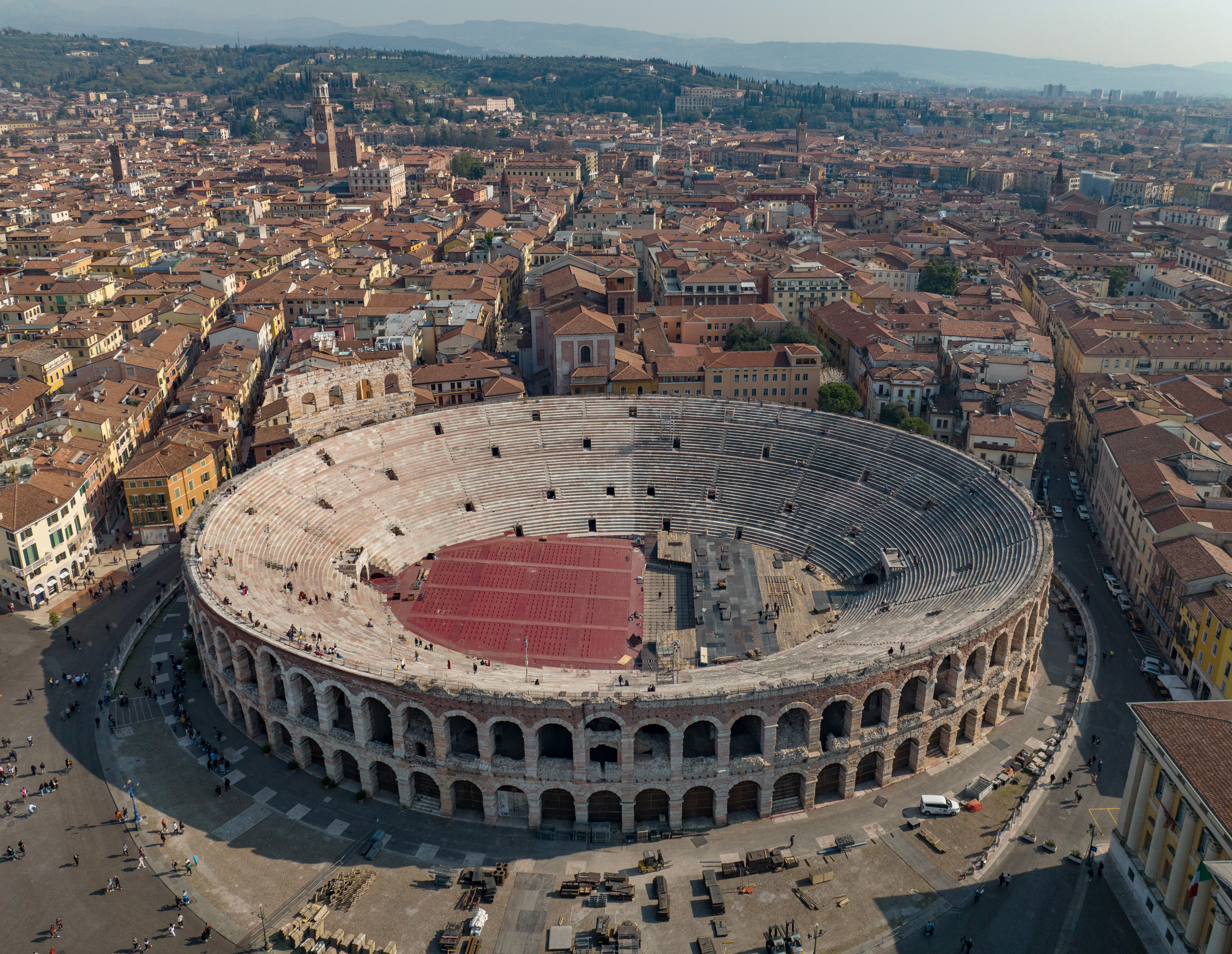
Verona Arena, Verona

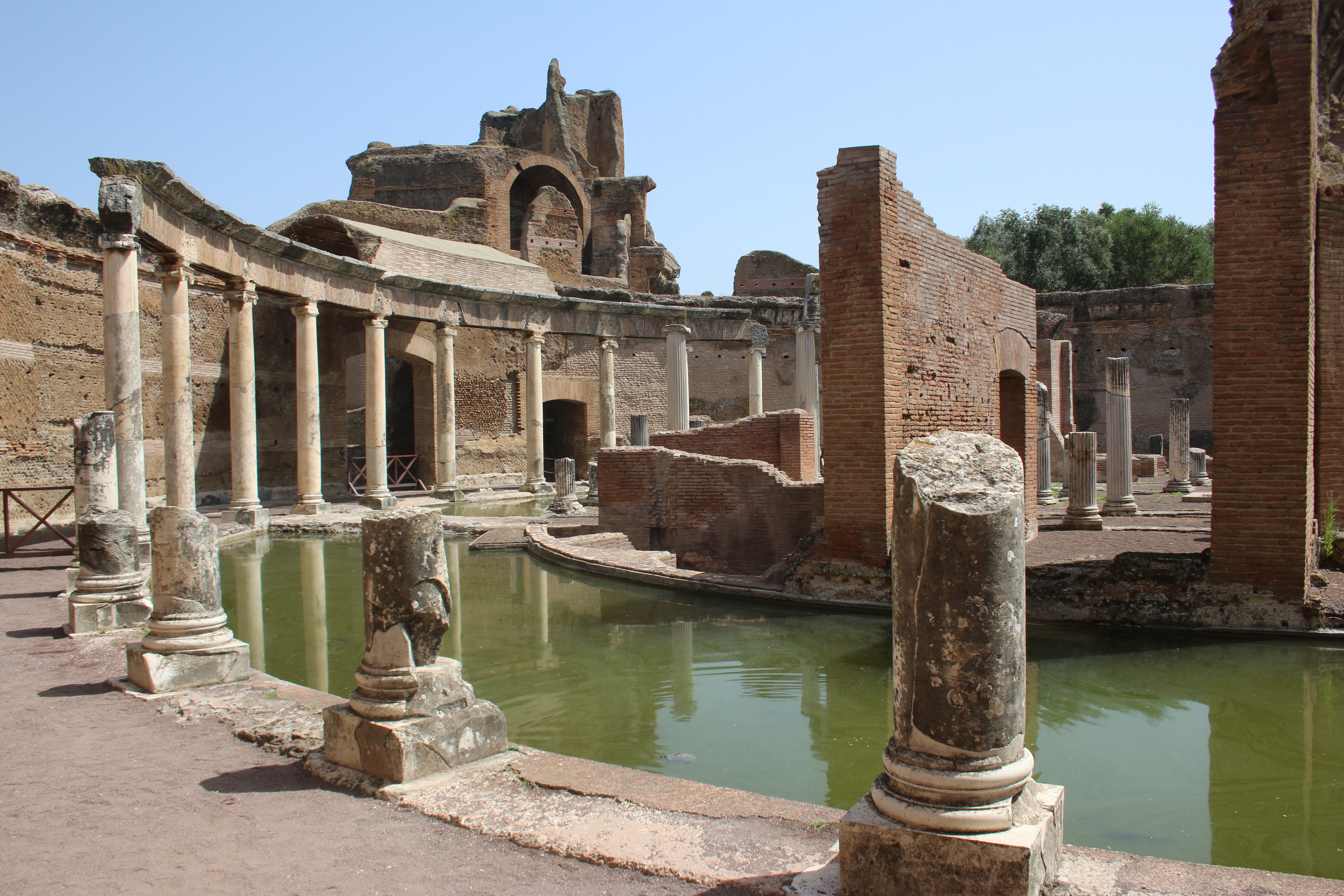
Hadrian's Villa, Tivoli, Lazio

=== Public buildings ===
- Baths of Trajan – these were a massive thermae, a bathing and leisure complex, built in ancient Rome starting from 104 AD and dedicated during the Kalends of July in 109.
- Baths of Diocletian – in ancient Rome, these were the grandest of the public baths (thermae), built by successive emperors
- Baths of Caracalla
- Colosseum
- Trajan's Column, in Rome
- Circus Maximus, in Rome
- Curia Hostilia (Senate House), in Rome
- Domus Aurea (former building)
- Forum of Augustus
- Hadrian's Villa
- Pantheon
- Tower of Hercules
- Tropaeum Traiani
- Verona Arena, in Verona
- Rotunda Church of St. George, Serdika, Sofia, Bulgaria
- Roman theatre of Philippopolis, Plovdiv, Bulgaria
- Roman Stadium, Philippopolis, Plovdiv, Bulgaria
- Roman baths, Odessos, Varna, Bulgaria
- Roman city walls of Diocletianopolis (Thrace), Hisarya, Bulgaria
- Roman tomb, Primorsko, Bulgaria
- Tholos

=== Private architecture ===
- Alyscamps – a necropolis in Arles, France, one of the most famous necropolises of the ancient world
- Domus
- Catacombs of Rome
- Roman villa
  - Villa rustica
- Pompeii
- Herculaneum
- Stabiae

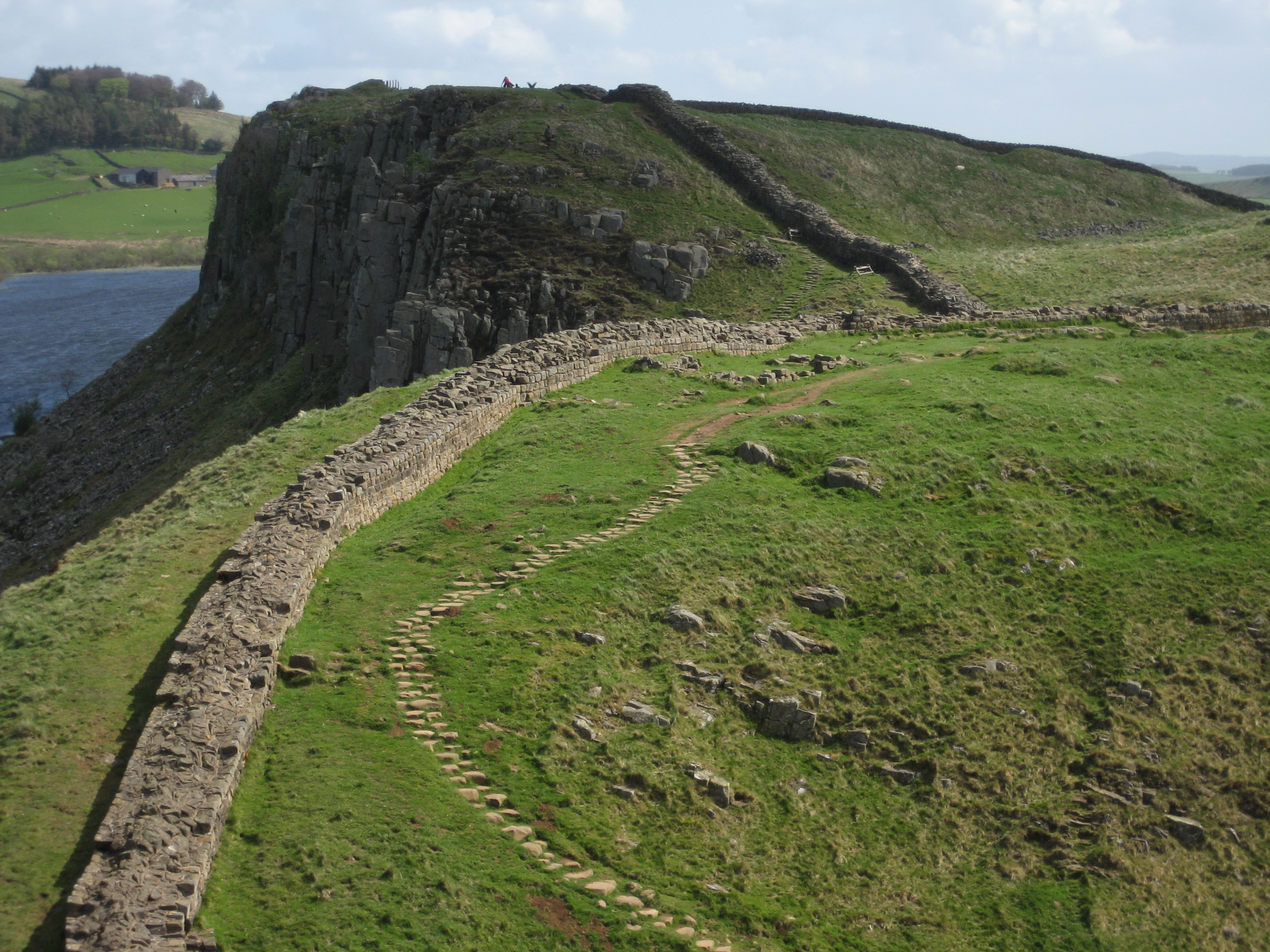
Hadrian's Wall, built in 122 AD in Roman Britain, in what is now Northern England

=== Civil engineering ===
- Roman engineering – Romans are famous for their advanced engineering accomplishments, although some of their own inventions were improvements on older ideas, concepts and inventions.
- Roman watermill

=== Military engineering ===
- Castrum
- Antonine Wall
- Hadrian's Wall
- Limes Germanicus

== See also ==
- Outline of ancient Rome
- Outline of architecture
- Ancient Greek architecture
- Architecture of Mesopotamia
- Achaemenid architecture
- Roman technology
- Agriculture in ancient Rome
