= Dam =

Barrier that stops or slows the flow of water

A dam is a structure that impounds water or restricts its flow. Dams are classified into four basic types: gravity dams are massive structures made of concrete or masonry that rely on their weight to resist the force of impounded water; embankment dams are large earthworks consisting of rocks, clay, sand, soil, or gravel; buttress dams consist of a sloped, concrete face supported on the downstream side by a series of triangular buttresses; and arch dams use a curved concrete wall to transfer the weight of the water to the surrounding valley walls.

Dams provide for irrigation, hydropower, water supply, flood management, recreation, inland navigation, and fish farming. Irrigation is a critical application of dams: about 20% of the world's arable land is irrigated using water from reservoirs impounded by dams. Dams generate hydropower, providing a clean and renewable source of electricity, and also supply water for household and industrial needs.

An early dam was Jawa Dam in modern Jordan, built around 3000 BCE. The Hittite Empire built several dams in modern Turkey between the 17th and 13th centuries BCE. In the 1st century CE, the Roman Empire began building masonry gravity dams – typically with vertical faces on both upstream and downstream sides. In medieval Europe, dams impounded water that powered water wheels for milling and mining. The process of designing dams began to transform in the late 18th century from an informal practice to an engineering discipline rooted in science. In the 20th century, the widespread availability of concrete and heavy construction machinery led to the creation of many large-scale dam projects worldwide.

The most visible part of a dam is the barrier that retains water, but most dams contain additional structures that perform important functions. When a dam blocks a navigable river, locks may be incorporated into the project to allow ships to pass through. Fish ladders are included in many dams to enable fish to migrate upstream. Spillways are often included to safely release excess reservoir water downstream and prevent catastrophic overflows. Dam outlets allow reservoirs to be partially drained to purge sediment, perform maintenance, or increase water flow downstream.

A dam may be deliberately removed for various reasons: if it poses a safety hazard, if the dam no longer fulfills its original purpose, to restore fish migration routes, or to improve the health of downstream rivers by improving sediment flow. Dams occasionally fail, resulting in flooding and loss of life. Many principles governing the design of safe dams have been developed based on lessons learned from dam failures.

== Definition and etymology ==
Broadly, the word "dam" refers to any structure that retains water or prevents flooding. (Note: Oxford English Dictionary: "A bank or barrier of earth, masonry, etc., constructed across a stream to obstruct its flow and raise its level ...; a similar work constructed to confine water so as to form a pond or reservoir, or to protect land from being flooded." Merriam-Webster Dictionary: "A barrier preventing the flow of water or of loose solid materials (such as soil or snow)".) In the context of civil engineering, the word is typically limited to structures that impound water or raise the level of a body of water. (Note: Examples of definitions in a civil engineering context: Bureau of Reclamation: "Dam. A barrier built across a watercourse to impound or divert water. A barrier that obstructs, directs, retards, or stores the flow of water. Usually built across a stream. A structure built to hold back a flow of water." "Levee. A natural or man-made barrier that helps keep rivers from overflowing their banks."; Schnitter: "Dams are built to impound water and discharge it ...".; Schleiss: "Dams are, by definition, hydraulic structures that block a section of a valley across its entire width, thus creating a geologically watertight artificial basin.... Fundamentally, dams have two characteristic effects: The water reservoir, created by the presence of the dam, ... contain[s] most of the ... inflow of water.... [and] The dam raises the upstream water level."; Denny: "Dikes and levees – which share the same design as embankment dams – are not true dams because they generally line the banks of a river or sea, whereas dams are placed crosswise in a valley.".) This article uses the latter definition; therefore, it excludes dikes and levees on the banks of a river, and diversion dams which divert a portion of a flowing river without raising water levels.

The English word "dam" is found in Middle English, and traces back to dam in the Germanic languages – Middle Low German, Middle Dutch, and Old Norse. The word's roots include Gothic faur-dammjan ('to stop up'), and the Indo-European base *dhē- ('to set, put in place').

== Types ==
Human-made dams are classified by their structural type: embankment, gravity, buttress, arch, and composite. Natural dams include rockslide, volcanic, and beaver dams.

=== Embankment dam ===
Embankment dams

Many embankment dams have a clay core and gradually sloping faces both upstream and downstream.

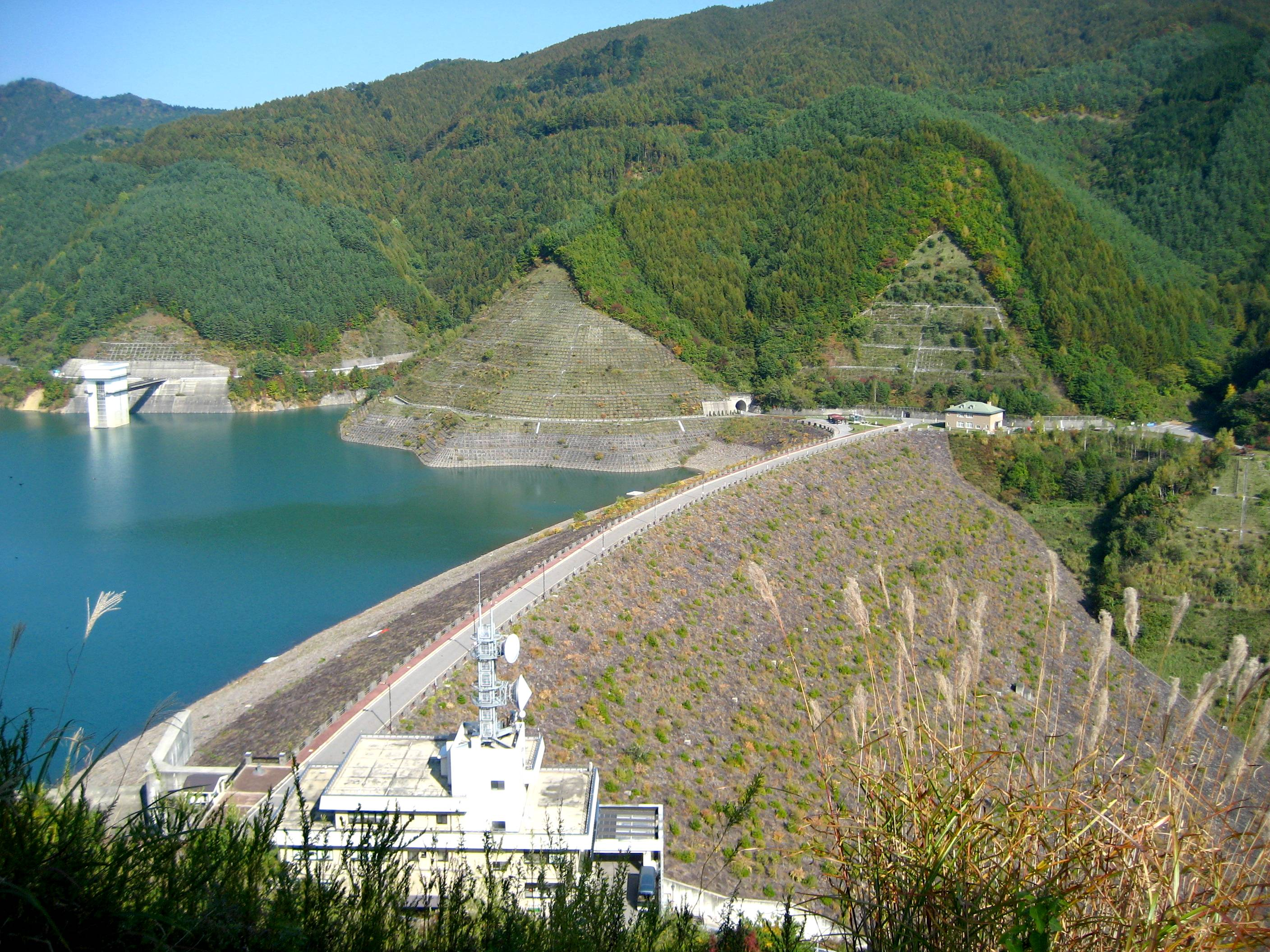
Misogawa Dam in Japan is an embankment dam.

The most common type of dam is an embankment dam, constructed from compacted natural materials – such as rock, clay, sand, gravel, and soil – forming a broad, mound-like barrier. (Note: Embankment dams are the only type of modern dam not made of concrete.) They are classified as rockfill or earthfill, depending on the primary material used. Among the largest embankment dams are Tarbela Dam, Nurek Dam, and Chicoasén Dam.

Embankment dams can be built from locally available materials, which make them less expensive to build than concrete dams requiring imported rocks and costly cement. They can also be built on softer soils because their broad base spreads their weight over a greater area (as opposed to heavy gravity dams that require bedrock foundations).

The primary drawback of embankment dams is that they are inherently permeable, so water can seep through or beneath the dam. Mitigation techniques to reduce seepage include placing a drainage system beneath the dam, injecting grout into the soil below the dam, and including a vertical layer of impervious material within the dam. If an impervious layer is included, it may be made of clay, cement, or asphalt. (Note: Some embankment dams contain a solid, vertical steel wall or curtain in the center, extending from the bottom to the crest.) Failure to properly mitigate seepage can lead to dam failure caused by "piping" – water starts to flow through (or under) the dam in a small channel, which gradually enlarges until a large hole is pierced in the dam.

Early embankment dams were often built of a single type of earth, but starting in the mid-16th century, engineers began to use several types of material layered in zones. (Note: Many modern embankment dams are still made of a single type of earth.) A typical zone pattern is a clay center (a vertical wall, extending from the riverbed to the crest of the dam), with gradually sloping banks of soil on both upstream and downstream sides, and both faces covered with large rocks. Large rocks on the upstream face protect the structure from wave action. In the 1970s, the Concrete Face Rockfill Dam (CFRD) design was invented, which is a rock-filled embankment dam with concrete slabs on the upstream face, sealed with waterproof joints. (Note: A Concrete Face Rockfill Dam (CFRD) is a rockfill embankment dam with an impervious concrete slab on the upstream face. Another common embankment design is Earth Core Rock Dam (ECRD) which is a rockfill dam with an impervious earth core.)

=== Gravity dam ===
Gravity dams

A typical gravity dam has a nearly vertical upstream face, and a broad base. (Note: The "toe" of a dam is the bottom of the downstream face. The "heel" is the bottom of the upstream face.)

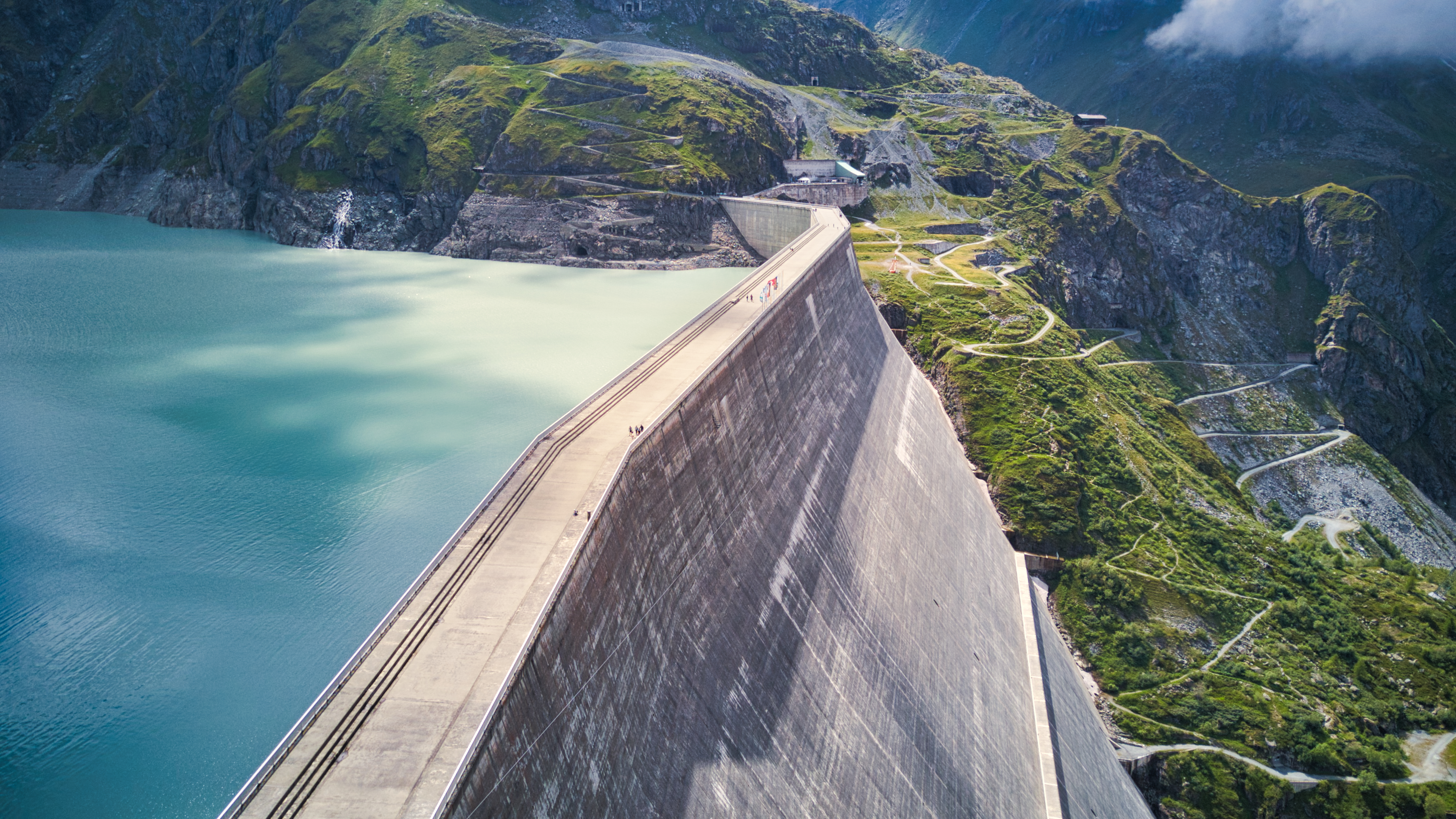
Grande Dixence Dam in Switzerland is one of the world's tallest gravity dams. The people atop the dam's crest illustrate its size.

Gravity dams rely on their weight to resist the force of upstream water. Historically, gravity dams were built of masonry – stone, brick, or rubble – held together by mortar, but nearly all modern examples are made of concrete. (Note: Nagarjuna Sagar Dam (1974) is an exception: it is a modern gravity dam made mostly of rubble.) The cost of concrete is much higher than earthfill used in embankment dams, so gravity dams are generally more expensive. An approach to reduce cost is to incorporate hollow chambers inside the dam – provided the dam's stability and strength are not compromised. (Note: Many dams contain galleries: long, horizontal passages that contain equipment, support water drainage, or permit workers to perform inspections. Galleries are not the same as the large chambers found within hollow gravity dams, created to reduce the amount of concrete used.) Notable gravity dams include Grande Dixence Dam and Grand Coulee Dam.

The crest (top) of a gravity dam is generally a straight line stretching between the walls of the valley it crosses. When the crest is curved (the convex side of the curve always faces upstream) it is called an arch-gravity dam (discussed below). (Note: The term "curved gravity dam" is an alternative to "arch gravity dam". In some contexts, the term "straight gravity dam" may be used to emphasize that there is no curve or arch.) (Note: Arch dams are classified as "thin arch" (thickness less than 25% of height) and "thick arch" (thickness between 25% and 50% of height). Above 50%, it is an arch-gravity dam. (Note: In the context of dams, "thickness" and "width" are synonymous and both mean the breadth of the dam cross-section measured in the upstream/downstream direction. "Height" is the vertical distance from the foundation to the crest (top) of the dam. "Length" is the distance measured along the centerline of the crest (top) of the dam from one end to the other.)) The cross-section of gravity dams is roughly triangular, with a flat bottom resting on the valley floor, and two inclined faces (upstream and downstream) that meet at the crest. (Note: In practice, most gravity dams have a flat crest (top) so a road can go across; thus the shape is a trapezoid.) To ensure that the dam is stable and will not tip over, the profile must conform to the middle-third rule, which states that the forces acting on the dam (gravity, water pressure, etc.) must produce a net force that is directed at the middle portion of the base (rather than directed near the downstream edge of the base). The thickness and inclination of a gravity dam must also be carefully designed to ensure stability. For non-overflow gravity dams, the thickness of the base should be about 70 to 85% of the height. The inclination (steepness, measured as run/rise) of the downstream face is typically 0.75 to 0.8, and inclination of the upstream face should be vertical or at most 0.05. (Note: The term "inclination" in the context of dams is the ratio of horizontal span to height. Inclination is the inverse of slope. An inclination of 1.0 is a 45-degree angle; an inclination of 0.0 is fully vertical. Inclination can also be expressed as a percentage: inclination 0.3 is the same as 30%. More details are at grade (slope).)

Because gravity dams are so heavy, they must rest on bedrock; a gravity dam built over soil would compress the soil, cause the dam to settle, and perhaps crack and fail. (Note: To prevent the dam from sliding horizontally, some gravity dams are "locked" into the bedrock by digging a large groove into the bedrock (parallel to the crest of the dam) so the dam structure is "keyed" into the bedrock. This lowers the risk of the dam shifting due to water pressure or earthquakes.) If the bedrock has cracks or defects, it must be prepared by injecting grout or placing concrete plugs. A concern that designers must address is "uplift": if water seeps under the dam structure, the water pressure can apply extreme upward force on the dam structure, which may lead to leaks or even dam failure. This risk can be mitigated with the use of grout curtains under the dam (which prevent water from seeping under the dam) and drainage systems under the dam, which lead water away when pressure increases.

=== Buttress dam ===
Buttress dams

A buttress dam has an inclined upstream face supported by multiple buttresses.

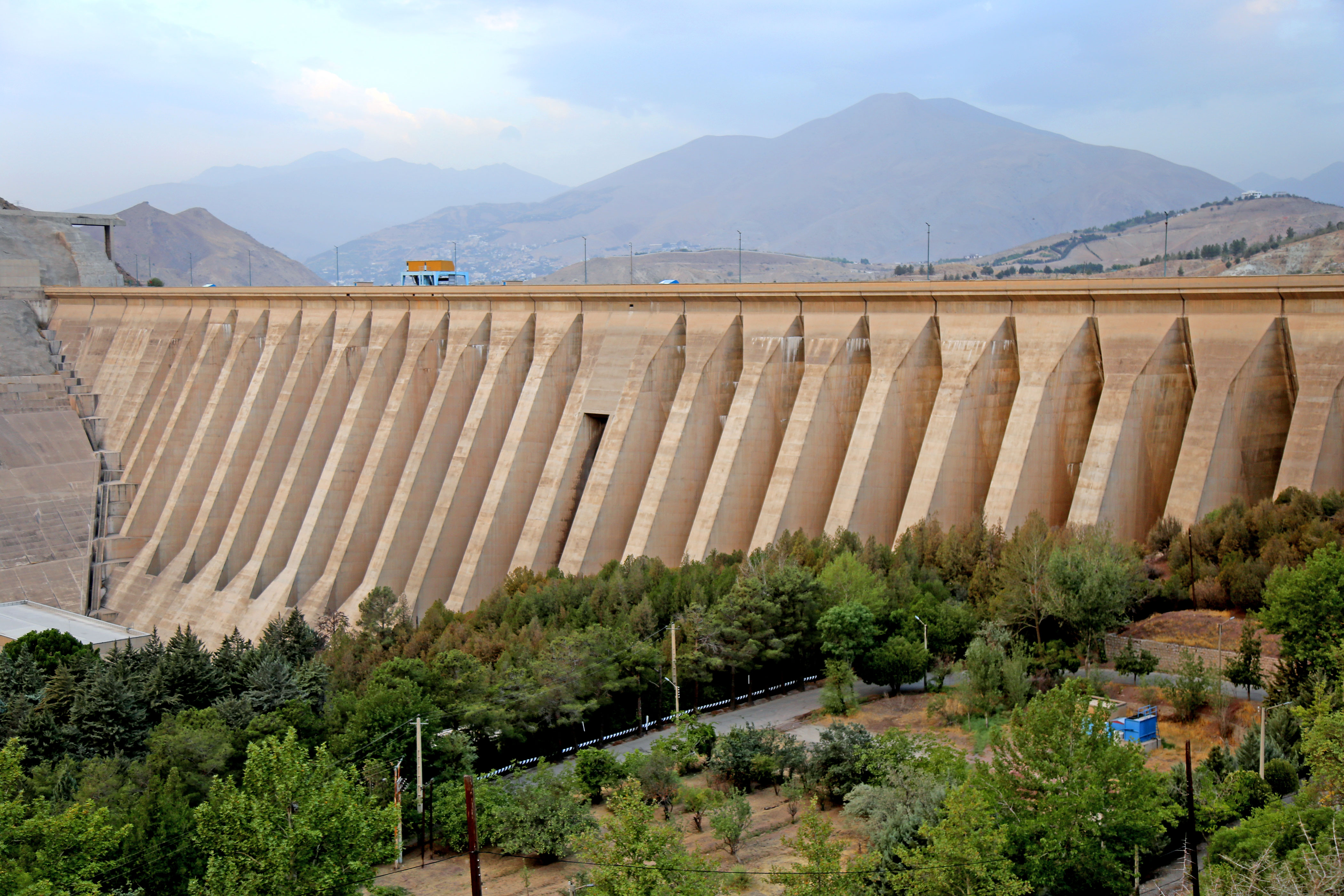
About 20 buttresses are visible in this photo of Latyan buttress dam in Iran.

A buttress dam consists of an inclined upstream face supported on the downstream side by numerous triangular buttresses. (Note: The upstream face is generally flat and straight, but each buttress may have a bulge (convex side upstream). Some older buttress dams had a face that was vertical. In that configuration, the face was essentially a retaining wall supported by buttresses on the downstream side.) Most buttress dams are made of concrete. Unlike a gravity dam (where the upstream face is nearly vertical) the upstream face of a buttress dam is sloped, typically with an inclination between 0.2 and 1.67. The inclination of the downstream face typically ranges from 0.09 to 0.8. The triangular profile of the reservoir's water pushes downward onto the dam, forcing it into the ground and increasing its stability. Notable buttress dams include Itaipu Dam, Lucendro Dam, and Al Massira Dam.

Buttress dams use much less concrete than comparable gravity dams, but the cost savings are offset by a more complex construction process. (Note: Buttress dams can use significantly less concrete than a comparable gravity dam. A buttress dam with upstream face inclination 1.0 and downstream face inclination 0.33 can use 89% less concrete than a comparable gravity dam.) Buttress dams are not as strong as gravity dams, and are suited only for lower heights. Because buttress dams have a much smaller footprint (the area of ground the dam structure rests upon) than gravity dams, the risks associated with uplift forces (from water beneath the dam) are lower in buttress dams.

The individual buttresses may experience slight movements relative to each other. If the upstream face of the dam were a solid piece of concrete, the movements of the buttresses could introduce large stresses, resulting in cracking of the upstream dam face. To mitigate this, the upstream face is divided into multiple pieces, one per buttress, called the "buttress heads". Adjacent buttress heads are typically separated by a gap, and the gaps are filled with flexible seals.

=== Arch dam ===
Arch dams

Arch dams transmit the weight of impounded water into the valley walls. (Note: The term "abutment" can refer to the end of the dam that touches the valley wall; the part of the valley wall that touches the dam; or a concrete structure (comparable to a small gravity dam) built between the arch and valley wall that takes the force of the arch.)

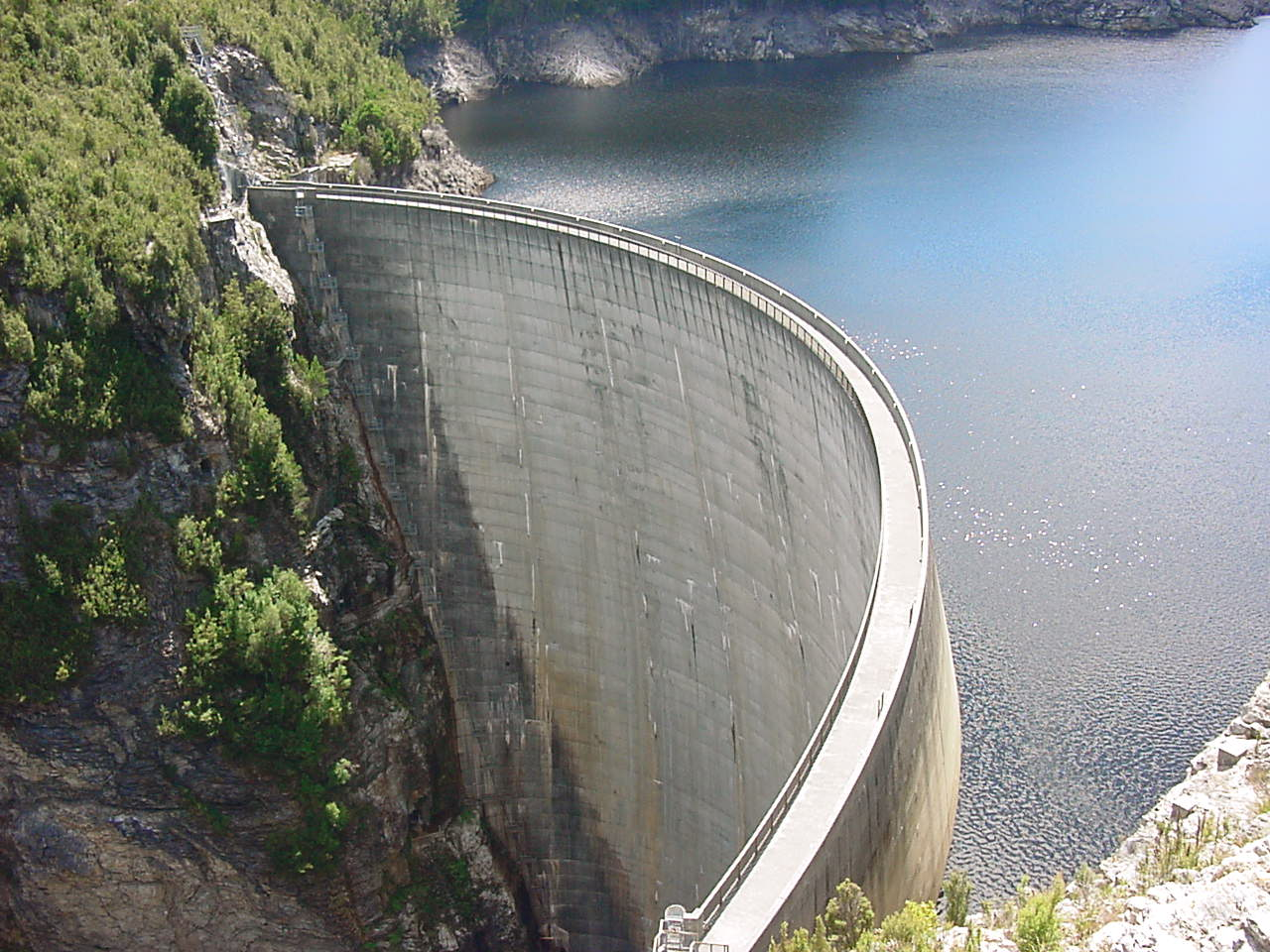
This arch dam in Tasmania is curved in both the vertical and horizontal directions.

An arch dam is a curved concrete structure that transfers the force of the impounded water horizontally into the valley walls. This design differs from gravity or buttress dams, which transfer the force downward into the foundation. Arch dams are relatively thin: the thickness of their base is less than half their height, and they are made of masonry or concrete. The central angle subtended by an arch dam can be relatively shallow or nearly semicircular, ranging from 46 to 140 degrees. (Note: A central angle of 133 degrees is optimal for minimizing the amount of concrete needed to build a constant angle arch dam.) Notable arch dams include Hongrin Dam, Flaming Gorge Dam, Moiry Dam, and Contra Dam.

All arch dams are curved, but there are a variety of shapes they may assume. Most older arch dams used a "constant radius" shape, which resembles a section of a vertical cylinder. (Note: The word "radius" in the context of an arch dam refers to the radius of the central angle of the dam structure.) A more complex shape is the "constant angle" shape, which gradually reduces radius from the crest to the base. (Note: Also called "variable radius" curve.) Research into optimizing dam shapes for maximum strength led dam engineers to adopt the constant angle shape for many arch dams, beginning in 1914. Another shape is "double curved", which resembles a section of a dome and is defined by incorporating curvature in the vertical – as well as horizontal – direction.

Regardless of the shape of an arch dam's curvature, the arch must transfer the weight of the reservoir water into the valley walls. Arch dams can only be built in narrow valleys with strong, steep, rock walls that can withstand tremendous forces. In some dams, concrete abutments must be constructed between the arch and the valley walls to safely transfer the load.

=== Other dam structures ===
Composite dam structures

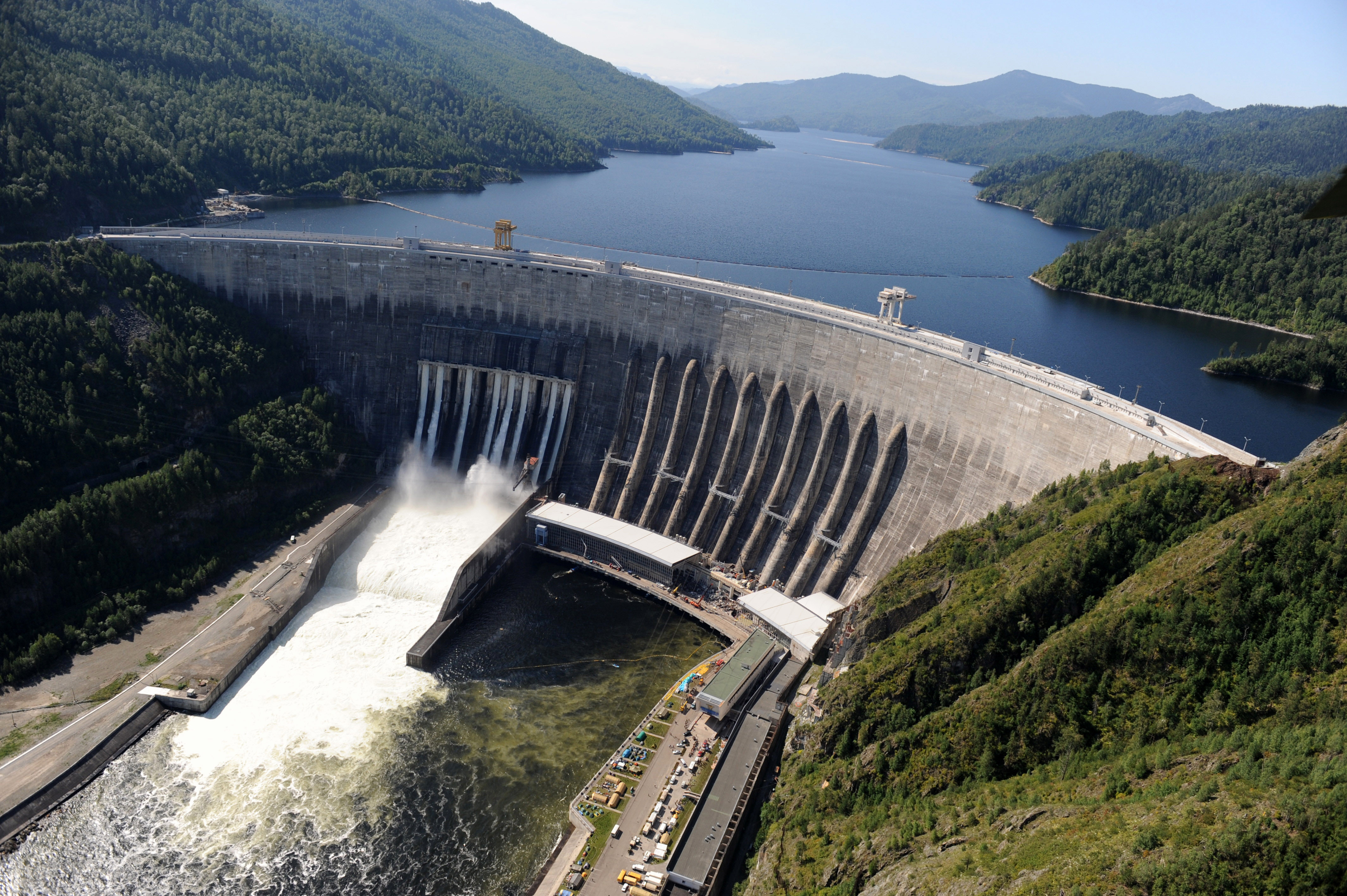
Sayano-Shushenskaya Dam in Russia is an example of an arch-gravity dam.

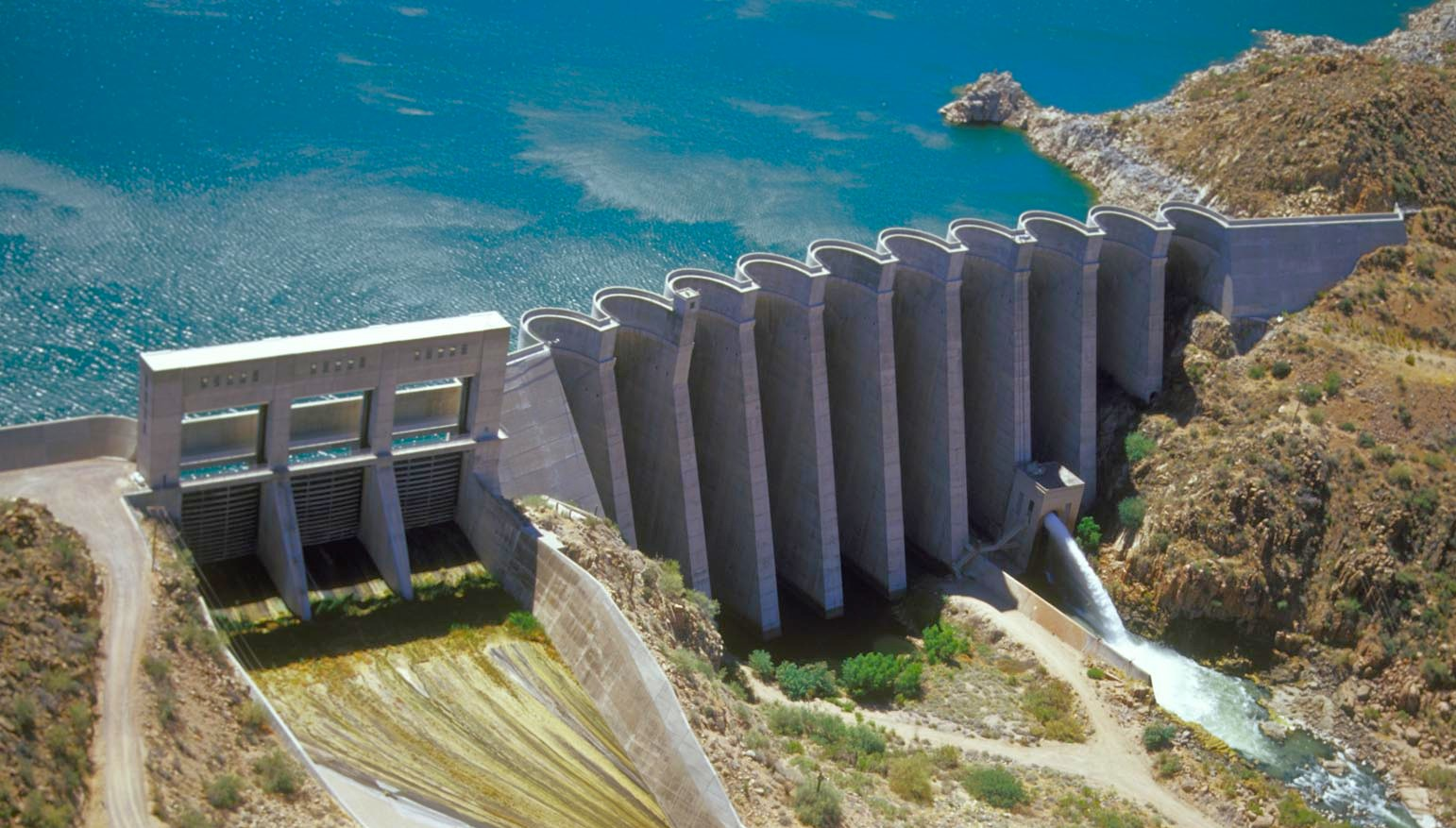
Bartlett Dam in the US is a multiple-arch dam.

Some dams combine features from two of the basic dam structures. An arch-gravity dam combines features from arch dams and gravity dams: the overall shape is an arch, but it is not a true arch dam because the thickness of the dam's base is more than half of its height – giving it a weight and footprint that is characteristic of gravity dams. (Note: An early arch-gravity dam was Monte Novo Dam in Portugal, built around 300 CE.)

A multiple-arch dam (Note: An equivalent term is "multiple-arch buttress dam".) combines features of arch dams with buttress dams. It is similar to a buttress dam, but the upstream face is not flat – rather, the face consists of a number of small arch dams: each arch connects one pair of adjacent buttresses. (Note: An early multiple-arch buttress dam is Esparragalejo Dam built in the 1st century CE.)

A barrage is a dam that has a spillway integrated into the dam structure, with multiple gates regulating the flow over the spillway. Dikes and levees – which share the same design as embankment dams – are not true dams because they generally line the banks of a river or sea, whereas dams are placed crosswise in a valley.

=== Natural dams ===
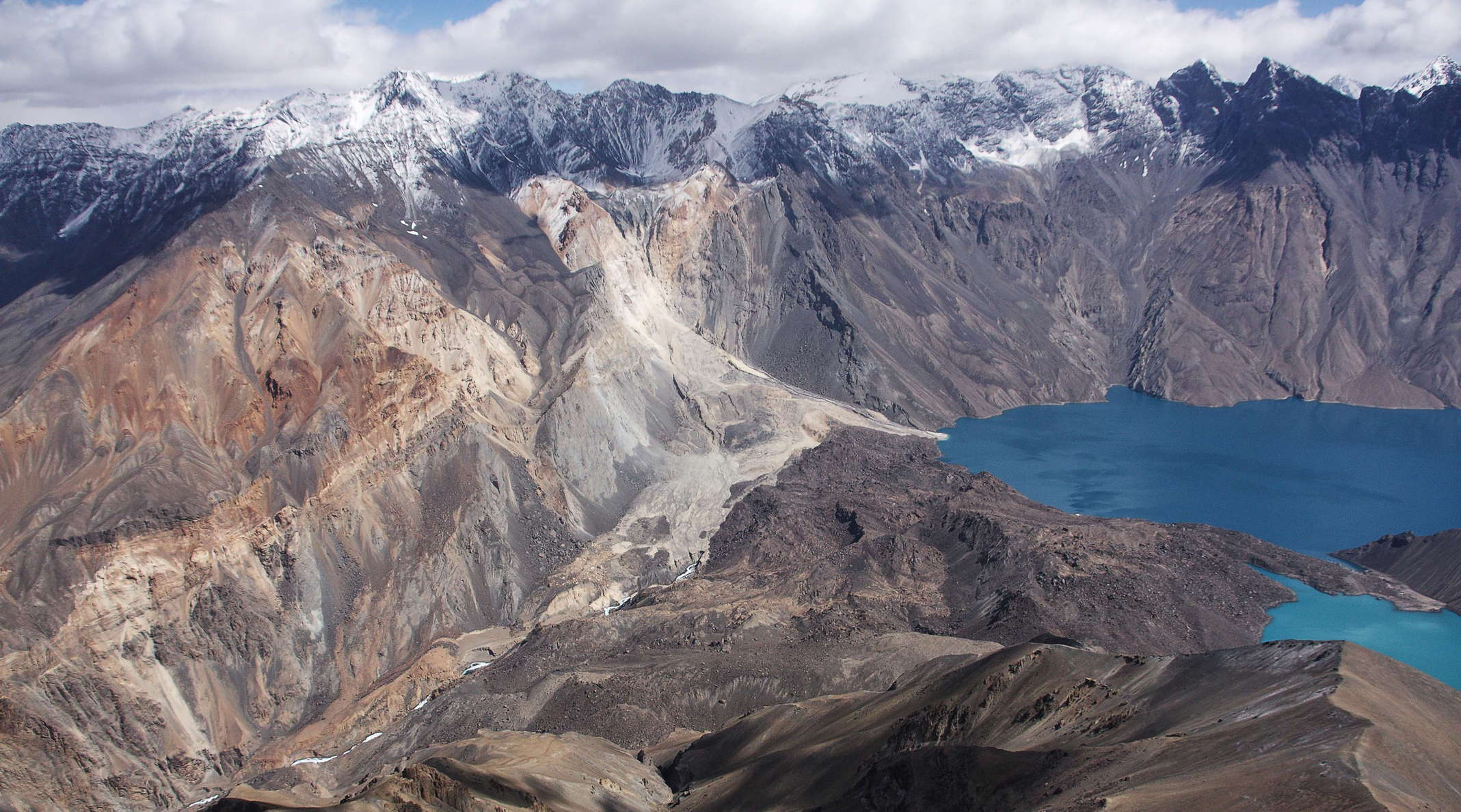
Usoi Dam is a rockslide dam formed in 1911 by an earthquake.

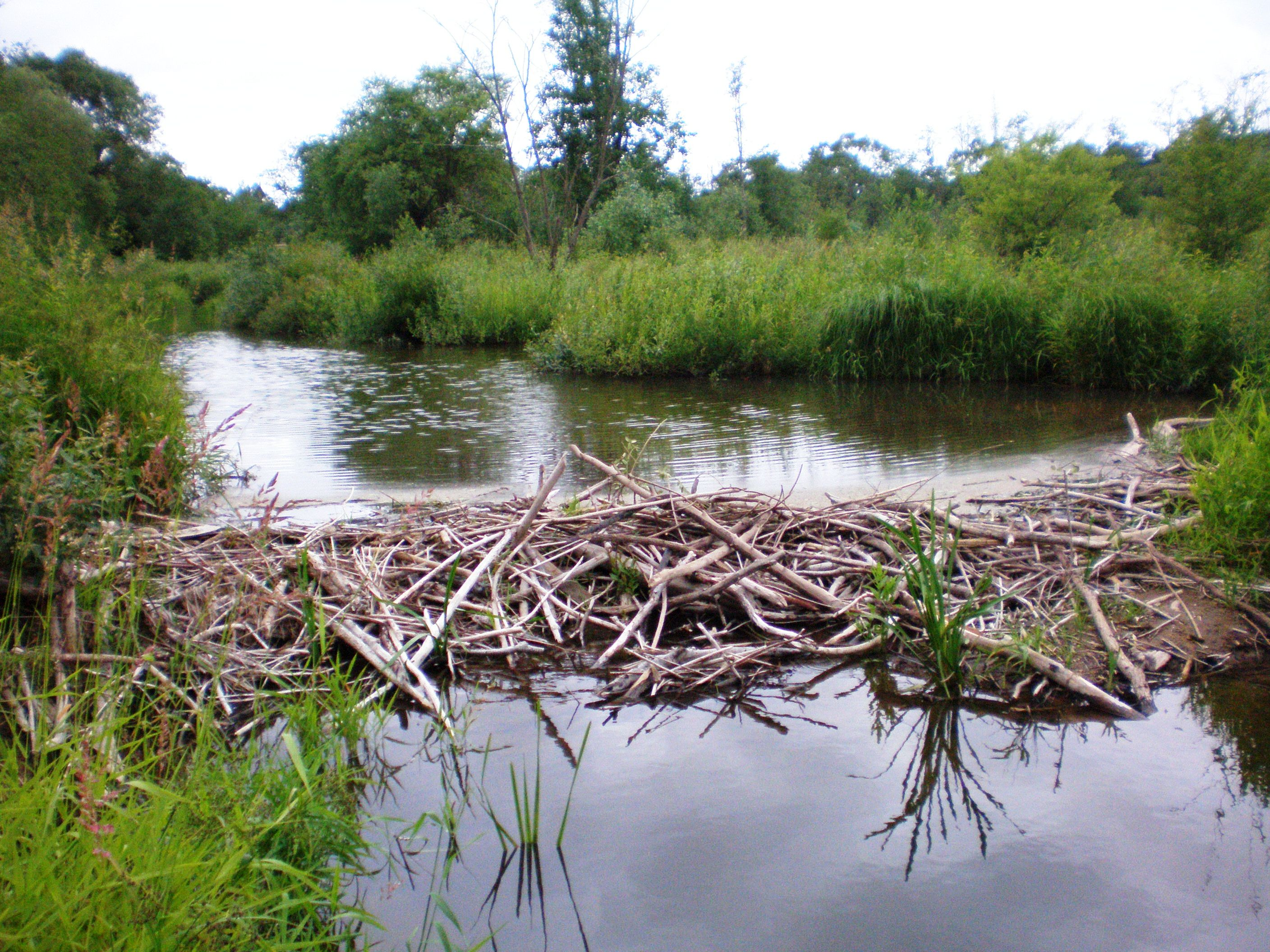
Beavers build beaver dams by dragging tree branches into streams.

Not all dams are made by humans: natural dams are barriers created by processes such as rockslides, lava flows, or by the dam-building behavior of beavers.

A rockslide dam is a natural dam formed by a rockslide that slides into a valley and blocks the flow of a river, forming a lake on the upstream side. There are thousands of rockslide dams around the world, including one created in 2010 in Pakistan that formed Attabad Lake. Rockslide dams have the potential to cause catastrophic loss of life, if they fail and create an outburst flood. In 1786, an earthquake created a rockslide dam on the Dadu River in China, which failed ten days later, killing 100,000 people. Risks of outburst floods can be mitigated by building spillways on rockslide dams to lower the water level. Engineers have used rockslide dams as foundations upon which to build new dams. Rarely, engineers have used blasting on mountainsides to trigger a rockslide and create a crude embankment dam, called a "blast-fill" dam.

Volcanic dams are the result of volcanic activity, which can create dams from lava flows, lahar deposits, pyroclastic flows, or other debris. Volcanic activity about 13,000 years ago created The Barrier, a lava dam in Canada, which impounded Garibaldi Lake.

Beaver dams are structures built by beavers across a stream. Beavers build the dams at night, carrying mud, stones, and branches in their forepaws and teeth. The dam creates a pond which protects against predators and facilitates food access. Some dams contain lodges – chambers built within the dam – in which beavers can dwell. Beaver dams modify the local environment in a way that creates new habitats for other species, making beavers a keystone species and ecosystem engineers.

== Uses ==
=== Primary purposes ===
Single-purpose large (Note: The International Commission on Large Dams (ICOLD) defines a large dam as "a dam with a height of 15 metres or greater from lowest foundation to crest or a dam between 5 metres and 15 metres impounding more than 3 million cubic metres".) dams in 2025, categorized by purpose (Note: Total number of single-purpose large dams is 30,851. Values in this chart include only single-purpose large dams; multi-purpose dams are not included in this chart.)

Multi-purpose large dams in 2025, categorized by purpose (Note: Total number of multi-purpose large dams is 11,423, but the sum of chart segments is over twice that, because each purpose is counted individually. Values in this chart include only multi-purpose large dams; single-purpose dams are not included in this chart.)

The main purposes that dams serve include irrigation, hydropower, water supply, flood management, recreation, inland navigation, and fish farming. Many dams – called "multi-purpose dams" – support two or more primary functions.

Irrigation is a critical application of dams: about 20% of the world's arable land is irrigated by water that originated in reservoirs impounded by dams (as of 2022). In addition to directly moving water from the reservoir to irrigation canals, dams can also support irrigation by "dry-season releases": the dam impounds water during the wet season, and releases it downstream during the dry season, thus ensuring water in the river year-round.

Hydropower provides clean, renewable energy in the form of hydroelectricity. As of 2024, global hydropower capacity accounted for about 14% of the world's electricity supply. More than 80% of the world's total reservoir water storage capacity is used for hydropower, as of 2006. The world's 40 largest reservoirs store 40% of the world's reservoir water, of which 90% is devoted to hydropower, as of 2006. In some climates, hydropower dams can act as an annual buffering system: the reservoir can be filled during the rainy season, then during the dry season (when it is typically hotter and electricity is needed to run air conditioning systems) the water can be released to generate electricity.

Some hydropower dams provide a pumped-storage capability: these dams consume excess electricity (for example, from solar power on a sunny day) to drive pumps that lift water from a low reservoir to a higher reservoir. When the electrical grid needs more power (for example, on a cloudy day), the water can be released to power the dam's generators to create hydroelectricity. A pumped-storage capability can be used in a 24-hour cycle: during the night, when community use of electricity is low, conventional power sources (nuclear, oil) can power pumps to lift water into reservoirs; then – during the peak consumption hours in daytime – the water can be released through the dam's generators to generate electricity.

Water supply – for domestic and industrial use – is the third most common purpose of large dams. In 2025, 3,394 large dams were dedicated to this use. Industrial usage is about twice domestic usage, but some of the water withdrawn from reservoirs (such as water used solely for cooling purposes) is returned to the river system.

Flood management is an important function of many dams. In 2025, there were 2,510 large dams in the world devoted to flood management. These dams do not try to prevent all floodwaters from reaching downstream. Instead, they try to reduce the peak flood level (height) to a safe limit. Since floods are so unpredictable, these goals are typically expressed as statistical margins based on lengthy return periods. For example, a dam may be designed with the goal of safely regulating 1-in-100-year floods. The flood-control benefits of dams may become increasingly important in the 21st century as flood risks are projected to increase due to climate change.

Many dams are built on rivers for the purpose of keeping the water level sufficiently high to support transportation, including barges that carry freight. These dams are typically low, and are found near industries that require cargo to be transported on waterways. Other dams are designed with the primary goal of supporting recreation or fish farming.

=== Other purposes ===
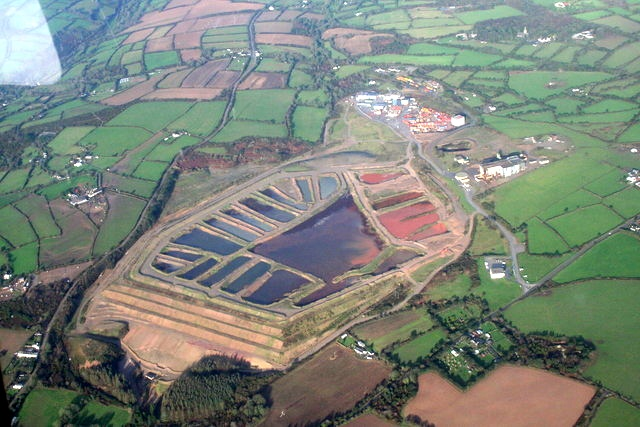
A cluster of tailings dams in England

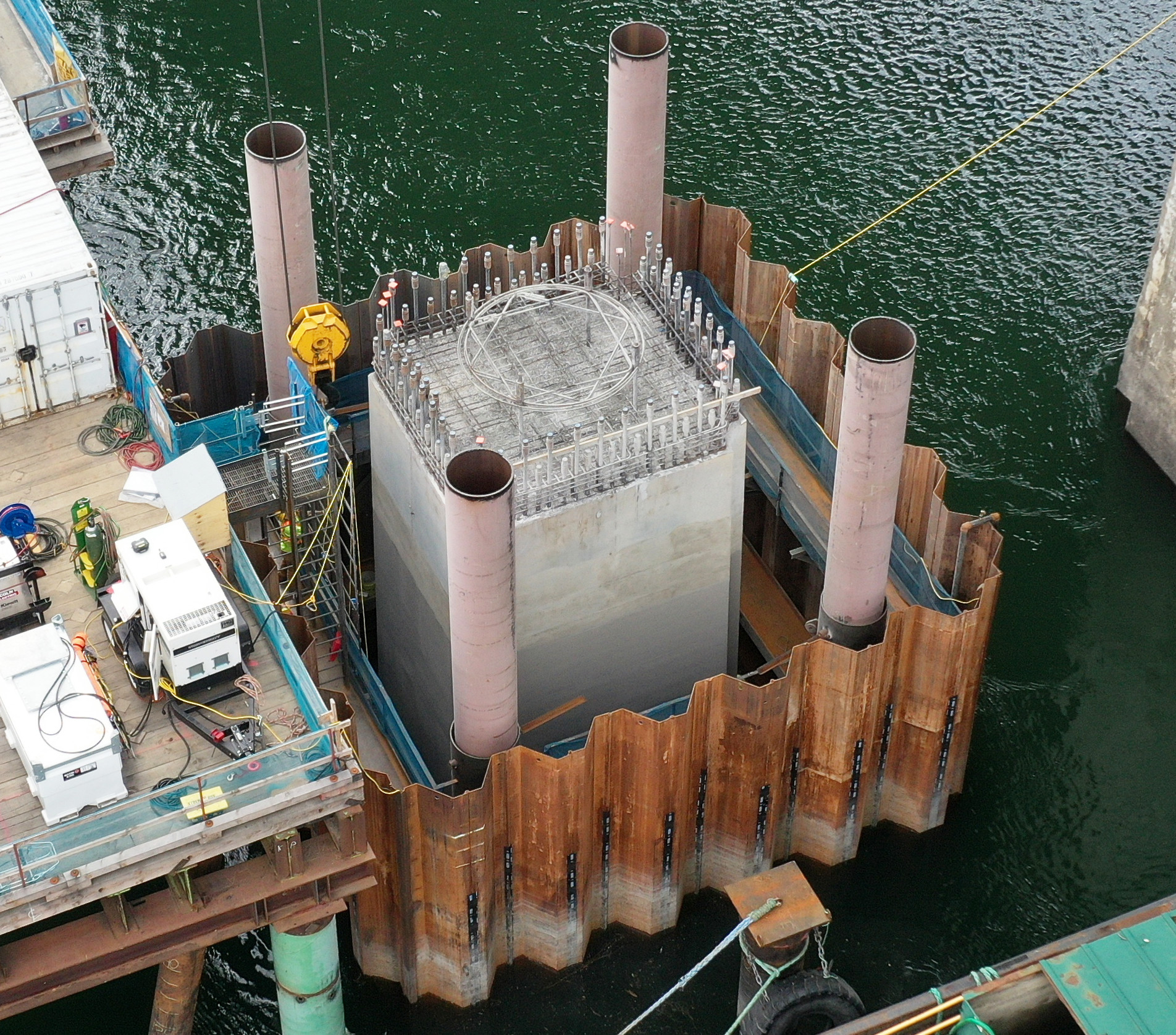
The rusty steel panels are a temporary cofferdam which is keeping the worksite dry while a concrete bridge pier is being built in a river.

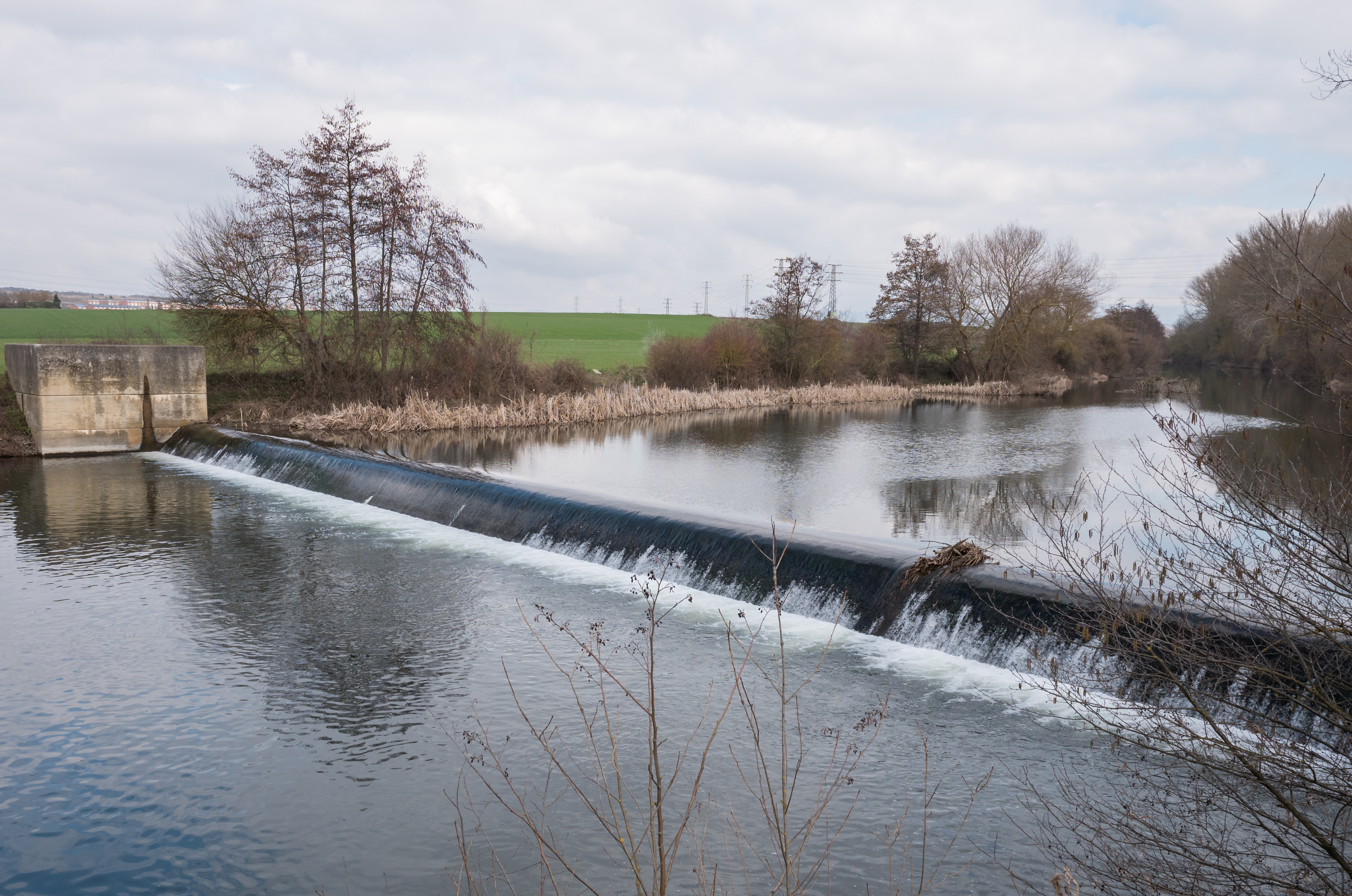
A weir in Spain

A tailings dam is a dam that impounds tailings – the waste generated by mining operations. Most tailings dams are embankment structures. Unlike conventional water-storage dams – which are typically built in valleys – tailings dams may be built on flat ground, with an embankment that encloses the tailings on all sides. Tailings dams are unique because they are often enlarged over time: as mine operations continue, the embankments are repeatedly raised. Tailings often include toxic by-products of mining, such as arsenic or lead. Therefore, tailings dams usually incorporate special protective measures to ensure that materials from the tailings do not contaminate the water supply outside the dam. Protective measures include foundation grouting, liners (clay or membrane), drainage blankets, and under-drains.

A cofferdam is a temporary watertight structure built at a work site to create a dry area for construction until the project is completed. Cofferdams are commonly used when building bridge supports in lakes, rivers, and oceans. When a dam is constructed in a river valley, cofferdams are often built upstream to divert the river through temporary tunnels or channels. The tunnels (or channels) carry the water around the construction site and discharge it downstream, keeping the work site dry.

A weir is a low, flat structure built across a riverbed. Weirs do not fully block a river; instead, they regulate its flow in a controlled manner. Some weirs are designed to maintain a water level in a stretch of river, while others minimize erosion of riverbanks. Weirs also serve landscaping or recreation purposes, or function as measuring gauges (the total water flow can be computed from the depth of the water passing over the weir).

If the ridge surrounding a dam's reservoir contains a saddle (low point) below the planned level of the reservoir, a saddle dam must be built to fill in the low point. Saddle dams should be designed with the same detail and care as the primary dam. (Note: Grand Ethiopian Renaissance Dam project includes a 5 km (3.1 mi) long saddle dam that holds back over 80% of the reservoir's live storage (i.e. the water that is above the lowest outlet of the reservoir).)

Underground dams are used to block the flow of groundwater and store it below the surface. They are small-scale structures constructed in arid regions where water is scarce. Some underground dams are built by digging a trench in the path of naturally flowing groundwater and placing a vertical, impervious barrier, then refilling the trench. Another design, used in sandy regions, is to build a low dam across a small valley so that occasional rainstorms will cause sand and water to accumulate behind the dam (the sand will inhibit evaporation of the groundwater). In both of these designs, a well or pipe is placed upstream of the barrier to withdraw the water.

== History ==
=== Antiquity ===
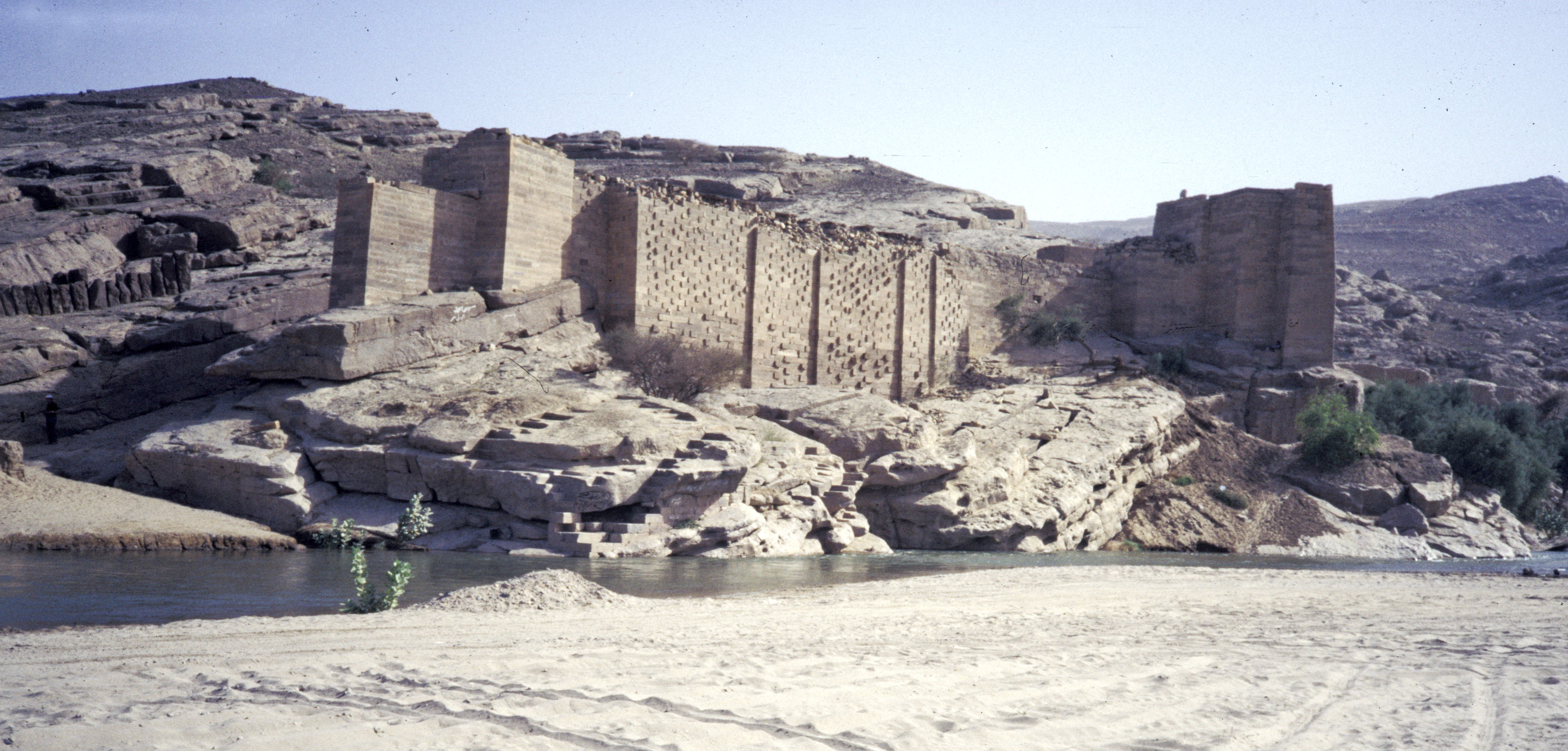
The Great Dam of Marib in Yemen was built around 500 BCE.

The earliest known dam is Jawa Dam, built around 3000 BCE near Amman, Jordan. This embankment dam was part of an elaborate water supply system and was 28 m (92 ft) thick and 5.5 m (18 ft) high. (Note: Traces still remain today.) Around 2600 BCE, the Egyptians built the Sadd el-Kafara embankment dam near Cairo, although it failed around the time its construction was completed.

The Hittite Empire built several dams between the 17th and 13th centuries BCE, including one near the Eflatun Pınar temple in modern Turkey. Beginning around 1500 BCE, the Sabaean peoples built a series of dams across the Wadi Danah, located in modern Yemen. This work culminated with the Great Dam of Marib (built around 500 BCE) which was 700 m (2,300 ft) long and 20 m (66 ft) high. An early dam in China – built by Sunshu Ao around 580 BCE – impounded Afengtang Reservoir, which still exists today. In Sri Lanka, several dams – including Tissa Wewa – were built between c. 370 and c. 300 BCE to create reservoirs. Some of the dams were several kilometers long.

=== Roman era ===
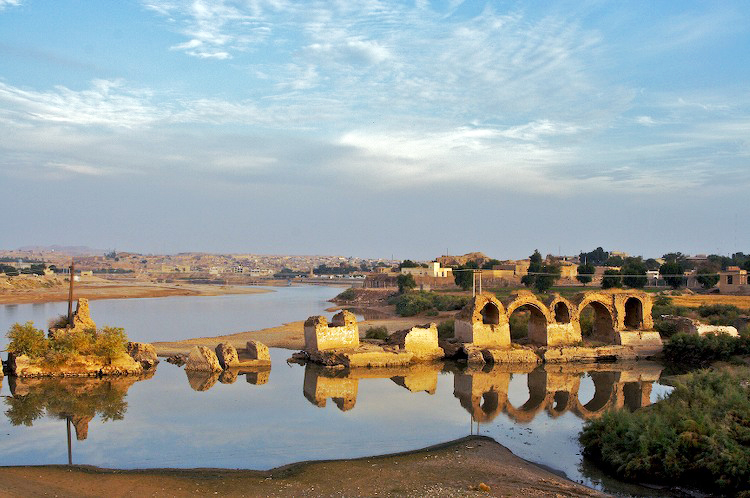
The Band-e Kaisar dam in Iran was built in the 3rd century CE.

The Roman Empire constructed major waterworks – including aqueducts and tunnels – starting in the 5th century BCE, but they did not begin building significant dams until the 1st century CE. Roman dams were typically masonry gravity dams with vertical faces on both upstream and downstream sides, although some were reinforced on the downstream side with buttresses or rock embankments. The Romans were the first to use cement as a construction material, which could be mixed with small rocks to form concrete, or mixed with sand to form mortar to join bricks or stones. Some Roman cements, particularly those containing volcanic ash, were waterproof.

One of the earliest dams built by the Romans was also their tallest: Subiaco Dam was built around 60 CE and was 40 m (130 ft) tall and 13.5 m (44 ft) thick. The Romans built about 80 known dams in Hispania (modern Spain), including Proserpina Dam, which impounded 6 million m^{3} of water and was still operational in 2026. Roman dam technology was applied in nearby countries: after Persian king Shapur I defeated emperor Valerian, he put Roman prisoners to work building the Band-e Kaisar dam spanning the Karun River. The Iron Gate was an early arch-gravity dam built by Justinian I around 550 CE near Antioch in modern Turkey. (Note: As of 2025, some remains of the Iron Gate are still standing.)

=== Post-classical Asia and Middle Ages ===
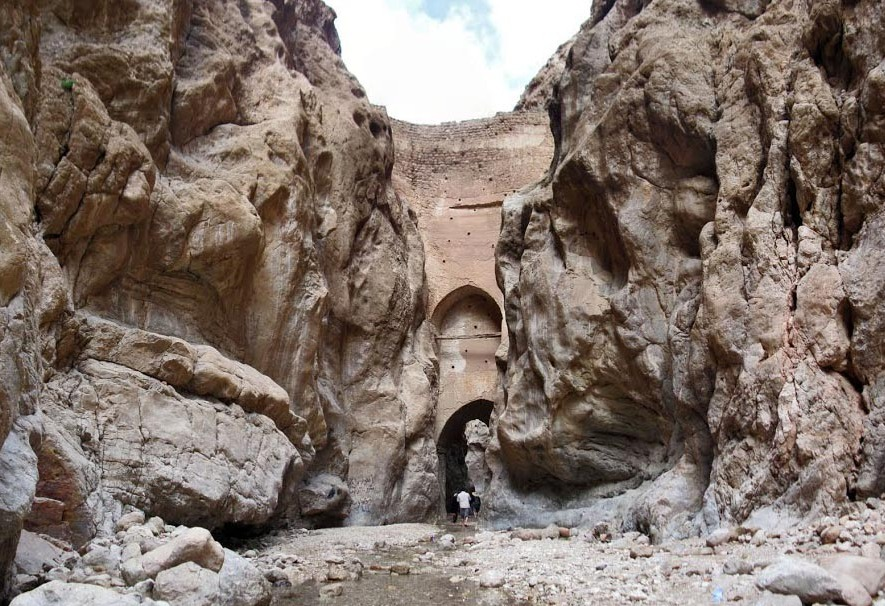
The Kurit Dam was built around 1350 CE.

One of the earliest dams built in Japan was Sayama embankment, built near Osaka in 380 CE, which was 8 m (26 ft) high and 300 m (980 ft) long. Kurit Dam – the world's first large, thin arch dam – was built in Persia (modern-day Iran) around 1350 CE. It was 26 m (85 ft) high and was later raised to 64 m (210 ft). It remained the world's tallest dam until the start of the 20th century.

In Europe, dams were used to power water wheels for milling and mining. An early example was Bazacle weir built around 1170 CE in France. Dams to create fish ponds were common in Europe, and hundreds were built in Bohemia during the 15th and 16th centuries, creating ponds covering a total of 1,800 km^{2}. Dams for irrigation included the Spanish dams Almansa Dam (1384) – an arch-gravity dam; and the still-standing (Note: Elche Dam was still in place as of 2025.) Elche Dam (Spain, 1640) – the first true arch dam built in Europe since Roman times. (Note: Almansa Dam contained an unusually large outlet hole at the bottom of the dam. The hole was covered with boards on the upstream side, submerged under the reservoir. Removing the boards (to purge sediment from the reservoir) was so dangerous that convicted criminals were employed for the task, and were pardoned if they survived the ordeal.) Several dams were built to supply Istanbul with water, including one in 1560 that brought water from Belgrad Forest. Another purpose of dams was transportation: Saint-Ferréol Dam was built in France in 1675 to provide water for the Midi Canal. It remained one of the highest embankment dams in the world for over a century. Several books on the subject of dam design were published in the 1700s by European authors including Jacob Leupold, Albert Brahms, Johann Silberschlag, and Oliver Evans.

=== Industrial Revolution ===
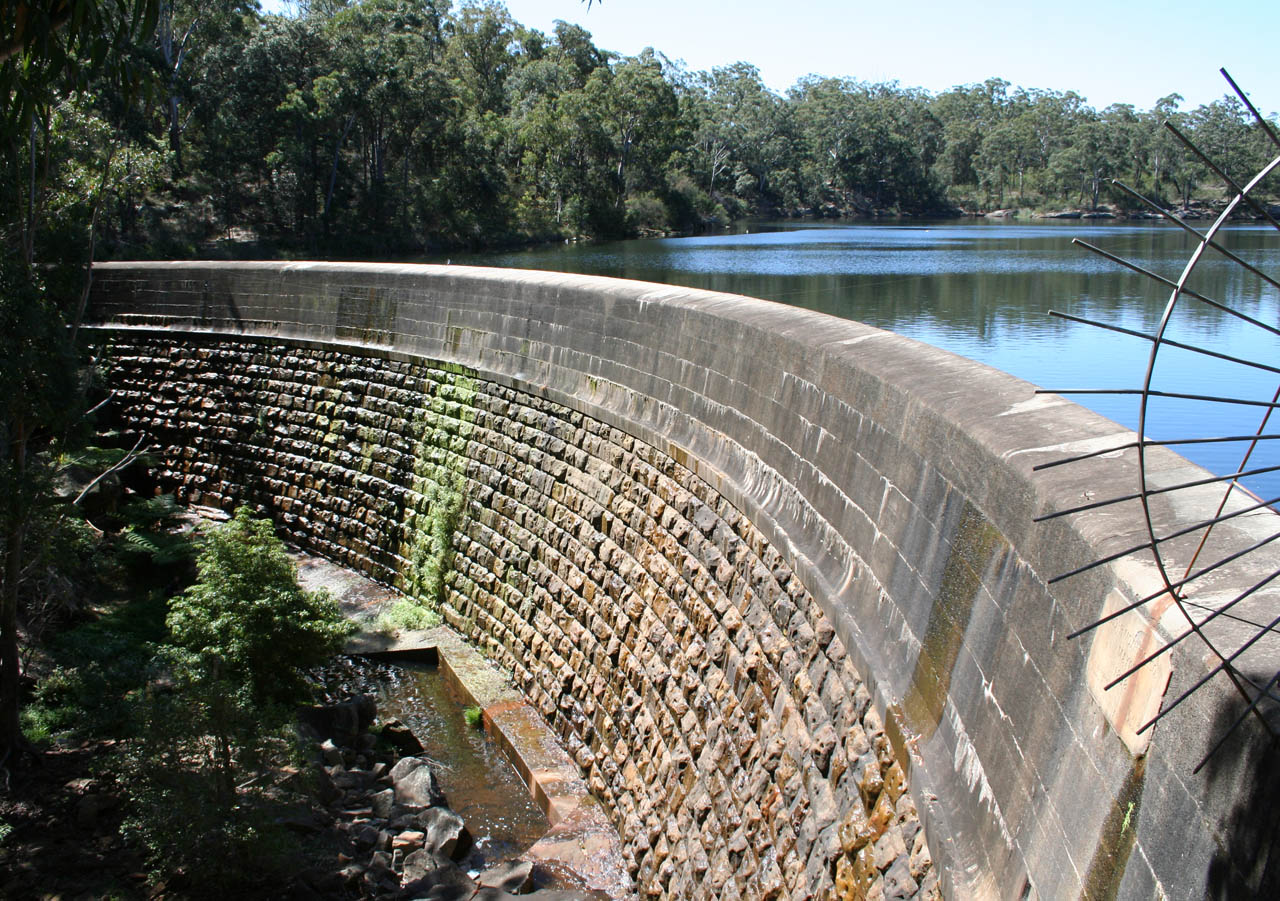
In Australia, Parramatta Dam tested the limits of how thin a dam could be.

In the late 18th century, the process of designing dams began to transform from an empirical practice – based on experience and trial and error – into an engineering discipline rooted in science. Important figures in this evolution included the French scientist Charles-Augustin de Coulomb who, in 1776, created a formula that described how soil reacts under stress. The formula was later applied to dam engineering by Alexandre Collin. In 1847, François Zola became the first engineer to design an arch dam based on an analytical consideration of stresses. The French engineer J. Augustine DeSazilly established that the optimal cross-section for a gravity dam was a triangle, with a vertical face on the upstream side.

These scientific foundations led to safer, larger dams of all types. Glencorse Dam in Britain (1824) was a 21 m (69 ft) high embankment dam that contained a clay core and had gently sloping faces. In France, Gouffre d'Enfer masonry gravity dam (1866) was 60 m (200 ft) tall. The world's first large buttress dam was Mir Alam Dam (1804) in India. In Australia, Parramatta Dam (1856) tested the limits of how thin an arch dam could be.

=== Modern era ===
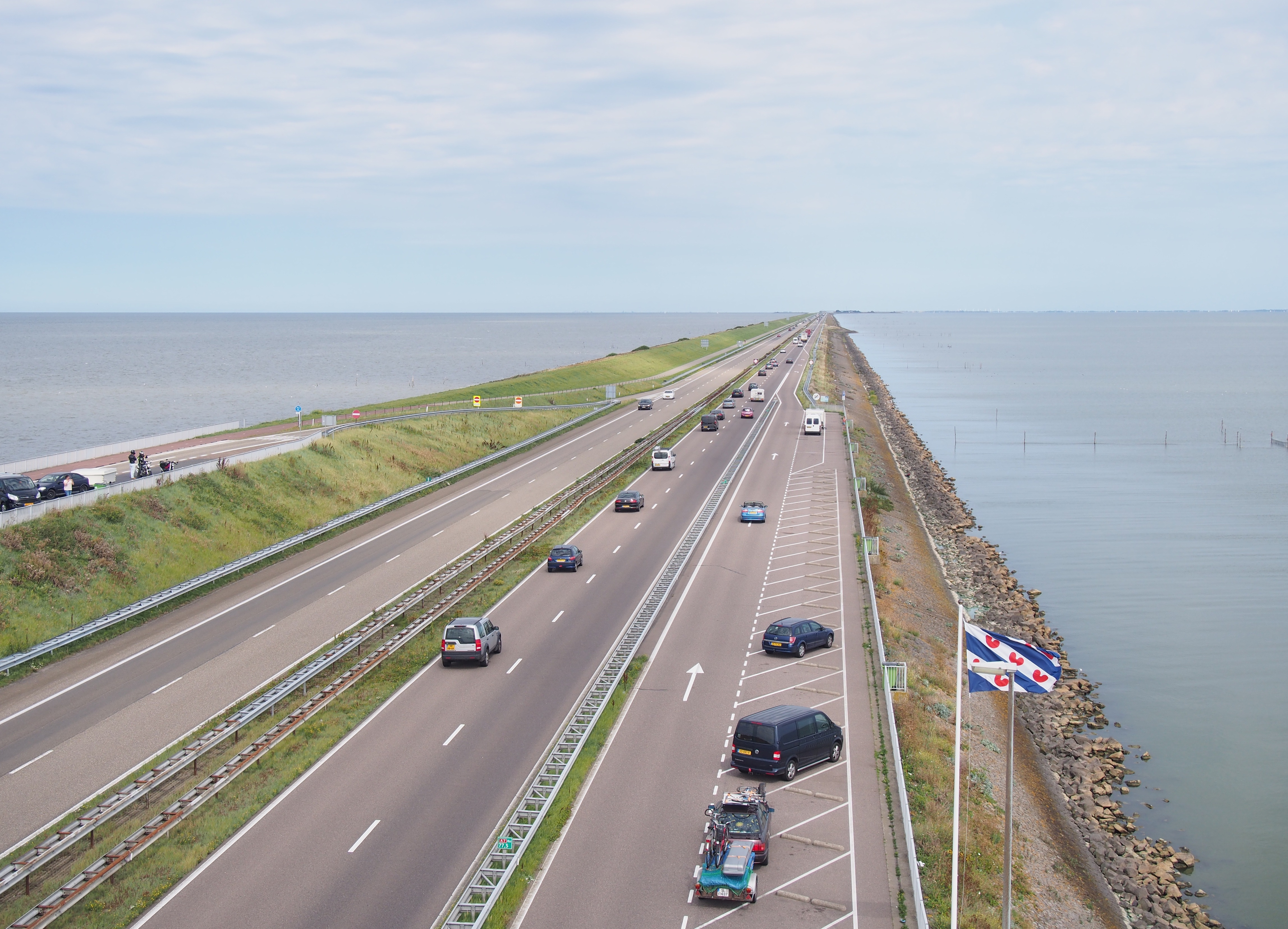
The Afsluitdijk embankment dam was built in the Netherlands in 1932 to enclose part of the North Sea and turn it into a freshwater lake.

In the first half of the 20th century, many large dams were built, particularly in Western Europe and the US. After World War II (WWII), the availability of heavy construction machinery – such as bulldozers, dump trucks, and scrapers – contributed to a substantial increase in dam construction worldwide. Notable dams of the modern era include massive concrete gravity dams like Hoover Dam (US, 1936) and Three Gorges Dam (China, 2006). Some modern embankment dams are even larger, including Tarbela Dam (Pakistan, 1976) and Nurek Dam (Tajikistan, 1980).

The invention of grout curtain technologies enabled dams to be safely built on top of porous soils. (Note: An early grout curtain was created under a dam in Bou Hanifia, Algeria.) This allowed Aswan High Dam (1970) to be built across the Nile River, which has a deep, sandy riverbed. Grout was pumped 208 m (682 ft) deep into the sand, creating an underground barrier spanning 57,000 m^{2} which prevented water from seeping beneath the dam.

The modern era also saw the emergence of arguments against dam construction. After climate change became a global concern, debates emerged arguing whether the electricity produced by dams was as clean as solar power or wind generation. Although hydroelectricity itself is clean, dam opponents argue that adverse environmental impacts (Note: Including deforestation and the large amount of carbon introduced into the atmosphere by the manufacture of concrete.) outweigh any benefits.

=== Global statistics ===
Number of large dams in 2025, globally, by structural type (Note: Statistics include only large dams.)

The number of large dams in the world in 2025 was 62,362. The total number of human-made dams – of any size – in the world in 2019 was estimated at 2.8 million.

The total number of reservoirs (large and small) in 2011 was estimated to be 16.7 million. These reservoirs store an estimated 8,000 km^{3} of water, which is about 10% of the volume of the Earth's natural freshwater lakes and 16% of the world's total annual river discharge to the oceans. The reservoirs cover about 305,000 km^{2} of the planet's surface, which is about 7.3% of the area covered by natural lakes.

About half the world's major rivers are impacted by dams or reservoirs and, as of 2019, only 23% of rivers in the world flow freely to the ocean. In 2015, the number of major dams planned or under construction was about 3,700, with most in China (highest total generation capacity), Brazil (highest number of planned dams), and India.

== Environmental impacts ==
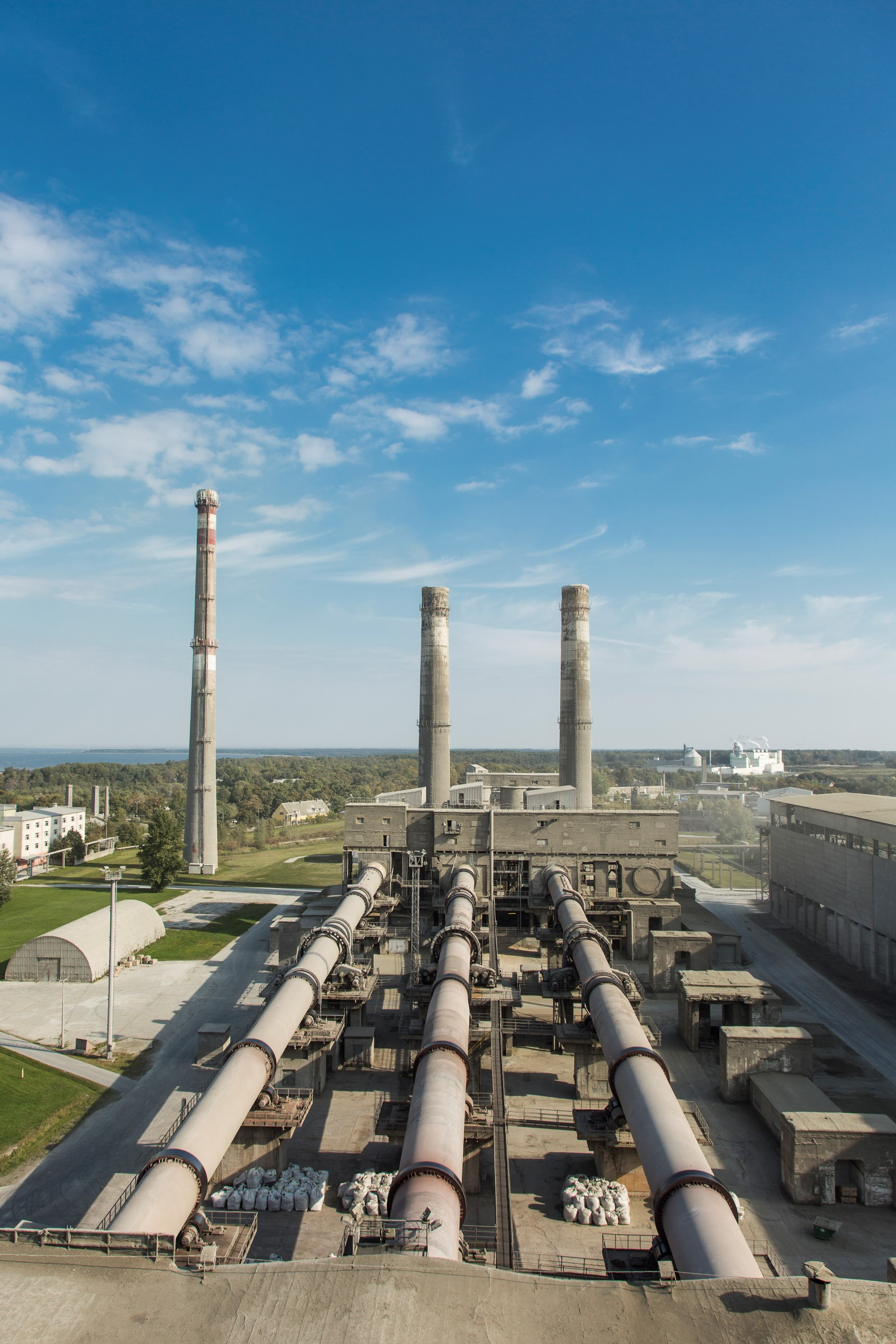
Hydropower dams produce clean, renewable energy. However, the production of cement required to build concrete dams generates greenhouse gases (kilns shown).

Dams can have a major impact on the environment by altering rivers, animal habitats, vegetation, forests, biodiversity, and microclimates. Dams often degrade the quality and volume of the downstream water – especially in the dry season – which can severely impact plant and animal species that depend on the water. (Note: Dams can adversely affect the quality of both surface water and groundwater.) In extreme cases, dams can lead to deforestation and desertification downstream, as has happened in Iran, where reservoirs behind dams lose about 2.2 billion m^{3} of water each year to evaporation, resulting in severely limited flows downstream from some dams. Desertification has also caused the Aral Sea – formerly the fourth largest inland sea in the world – to virtually disappear; partially due to dams constructed in the former Soviet Union to support irrigation.

Rivers normally carry sediment that replenishes soil downstream of the dam site. Sediment flow is reduced after a dam is constructed, because sediment is trapped in the reservoir, which may cause river deltas to shrink due to lack of replenishment. The tremendous weight of water in a reservoir can trigger landslides and induce earthquakes, as occurred after filling the reservoirs of the Hoover Dam (US, 1936) and Nurek Dam (Tajikistan, 1972).

A dam and its reservoir can cause species of fish and terrestrial animals to become threatened or extinct. In Malaysia, the Temenggor Dam inundated important forests and threatened about 100 species of mammals and 300 species of birds. (Note: Also in Malaysia a hydropower project on the Tembeling River was cancelled because it would have flooded 130 km^{2} of tropical rain forest.) A study on the global impact of 31,780 dams on 7,369 fish species found that 53% of the species are threatened with extirpation (local extinction) in parts of their range. (Note: The study found that 18 species (in Brazil, India, China, South-Africa and Austria) are threatened with extinction across their entire range.) Migratory fish are especially vulnerable: in the Yangtze river alone, dams have caused five species to reach the verge of extinction, despite efforts to preserve them. (Note: The five species are Chinese sturgeon, Chinese paddlefish, Yangtze sturgeon, Chinese sucker, and Coreius guichenoti. The paddlefish is totally extinct. The other species are nearly extinct or extinct in the wild.) Around 2010, the Chinese paddlefish became extinct primarily due to construction of Gezhouba Dam, and the baiji river dolphin became functionally extinct following construction of Three Gorges Dam. (Note: The baiji river dolphin became extinct for a variety of reasons, including overfishing, loss of habitat, pollution, and habitat fragmentation due to Three Gorges Dam.)

The Diama Dam (Senegal and Mauritania, 1986) blocked the flow of the Senegal River, causing increased salinity downstream that led to dieback of native vegetation. Together with agriculture, it contributed to the development of invasive aquatic plants in the upstream and to a strong decline in fishing catches through the blockage of fish migrations and the reduction in size and connectivity of wetlands and main stem. Dams can impede fish migration by blocking access to spawning habitat upstream of the dam. Mequinenza Dam (Spain, 1964) on the Ebro River blocked the migratory paths of sturgeons, shad, and lampreys; and its reservoir created a new habitat where invasive species flourished, such as zebra mussel, Asian clam, and wels catfish.

Air quality may be affected both while the dam is being built, and after it is completed. During construction, large amounts of airborne particulates are introduced to the atmosphere; and after the dam begins operating, the reservoir's water can influence the humidity and may impact the microclimate near the dam site.

Electricity produced by hydropower dams is renewable and is generally much cleaner than power produced from fossil fuels. Dams with large reservoirs in cold climates produce 30 to 60 times less carbon dioxide (CO_{2}) and methane than power stations that burn coal or petroleum products. Although the production of electricity is clean, the process of building a concrete dam is responsible for the release of large amounts of greenhouse gases into the atmosphere, which contribute to climate change. To produce one cubic meter of concrete, between 100 and 300 kg of CO_{2} is emitted. (Note: Each cubic meter of concrete uses about 250 kg of cement and contributes between 100 and 300 kg of CO_{2} into the atmosphere. These carbon figures only include CO_{2} from the manufacture of cement and do not include exhaust from vehicles and machinery used while building the dam.) CO_{2} is also emitted from reservoir water as organic matter decomposes; the organic matter includes all plants and trees submerged by the reservoir, as well as plant life carried into the reservoir from upstream.

== Socio-economic impacts ==
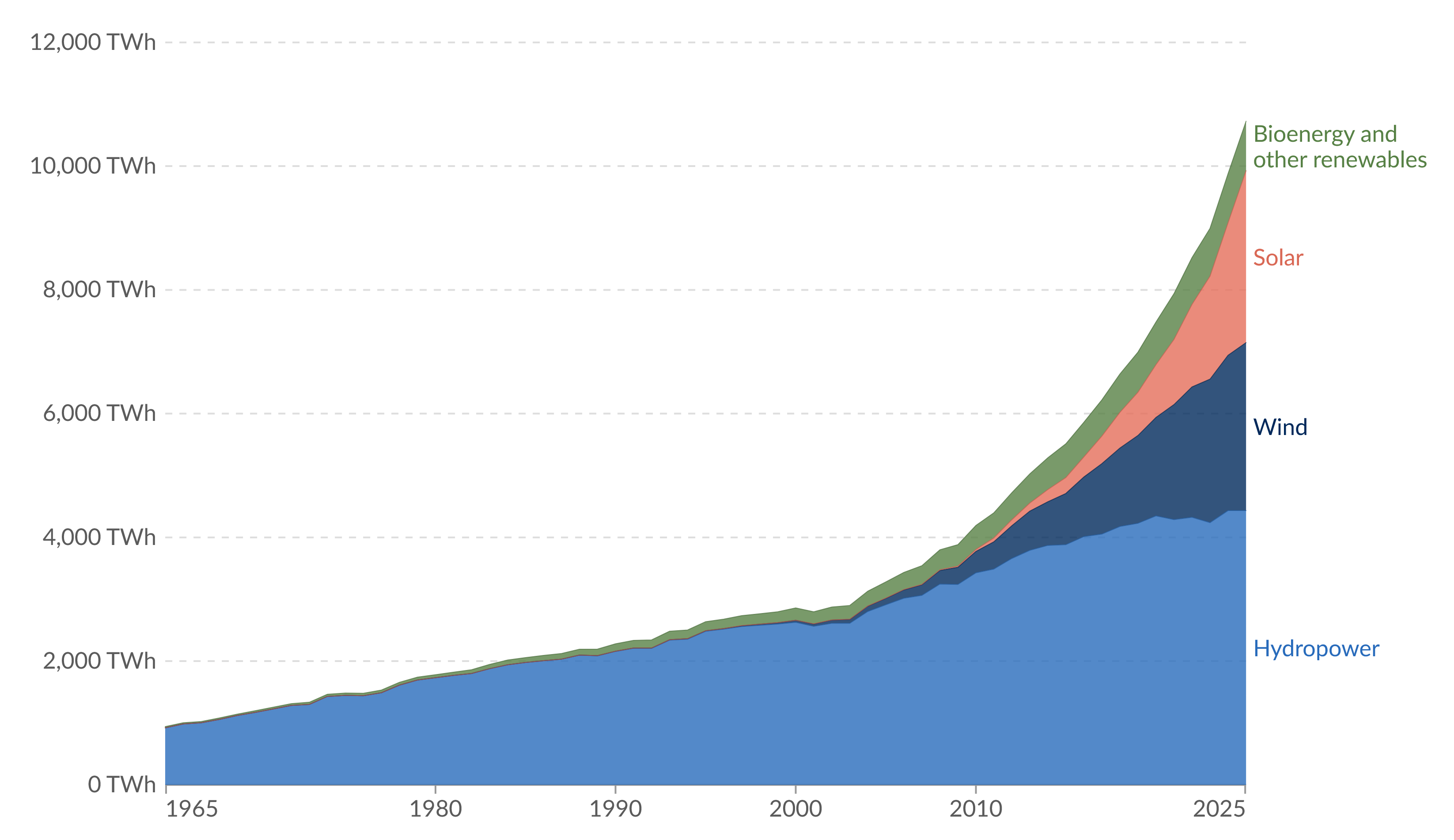
Dams generated more electricity than any other renewable energy source during the period 1965 to 2025.

Dams can provide significant benefits to a community through their primary functions such as irrigation, water supply, and hydroelectricity. They can also contribute to economic development by supporting industrial growth and increased employment. The reservoirs created by some dams can provide recreational opportunities such as boating, water-skiing, swimming, kayaking, canoeing, sailing, and waterfowl hunting. (Note: In the United States, applications for dam construction may require the developer to assess recreational activities that are eliminated or impacted if the dam were to be built.)

Dams can also adversely impact the quality of life in local communities. A dam and its reservoir may interfere with transportation networks, degrade water quality, alter natural landscapes, submerge important archaeological sites, and displace large numbers of people.

Land adjacent to a reservoir may become saturated with water, increasing soil salinity and affecting agricultural production. The level of groundwater surrounding a reservoir may rise, and the quality of water obtained from wells may degrade. Some rivers – prior to being dammed – experienced an annual flood cycle that deposited nutrient-rich soil in the valley lowlands; after damming, the flood cycle was disrupted, and farmers may be required to use fertilizer to maintain the same crop yields. (Note: Locations that required farmers to begin using fertilizer after dam construction include the Nile River.)

Some dam projects threaten to flood natural wonders or cultural heritage sites. Aswan High Dam (Egypt, 1970) would have submerged the Philae and Abu Simbel temples had they not been relocated by an international rescue effort. (Note: An international rescue effort relocated several important archaeological sites before Lake Nasser – the reservoir formed by the Aswan High Dam – was filled, but lack of funding left some sites to become submerged, including the Fortress of Buhen.) Itaipu Dam (Brazil and Paraguay, 1984) inundated the renowned Guaíra Falls.

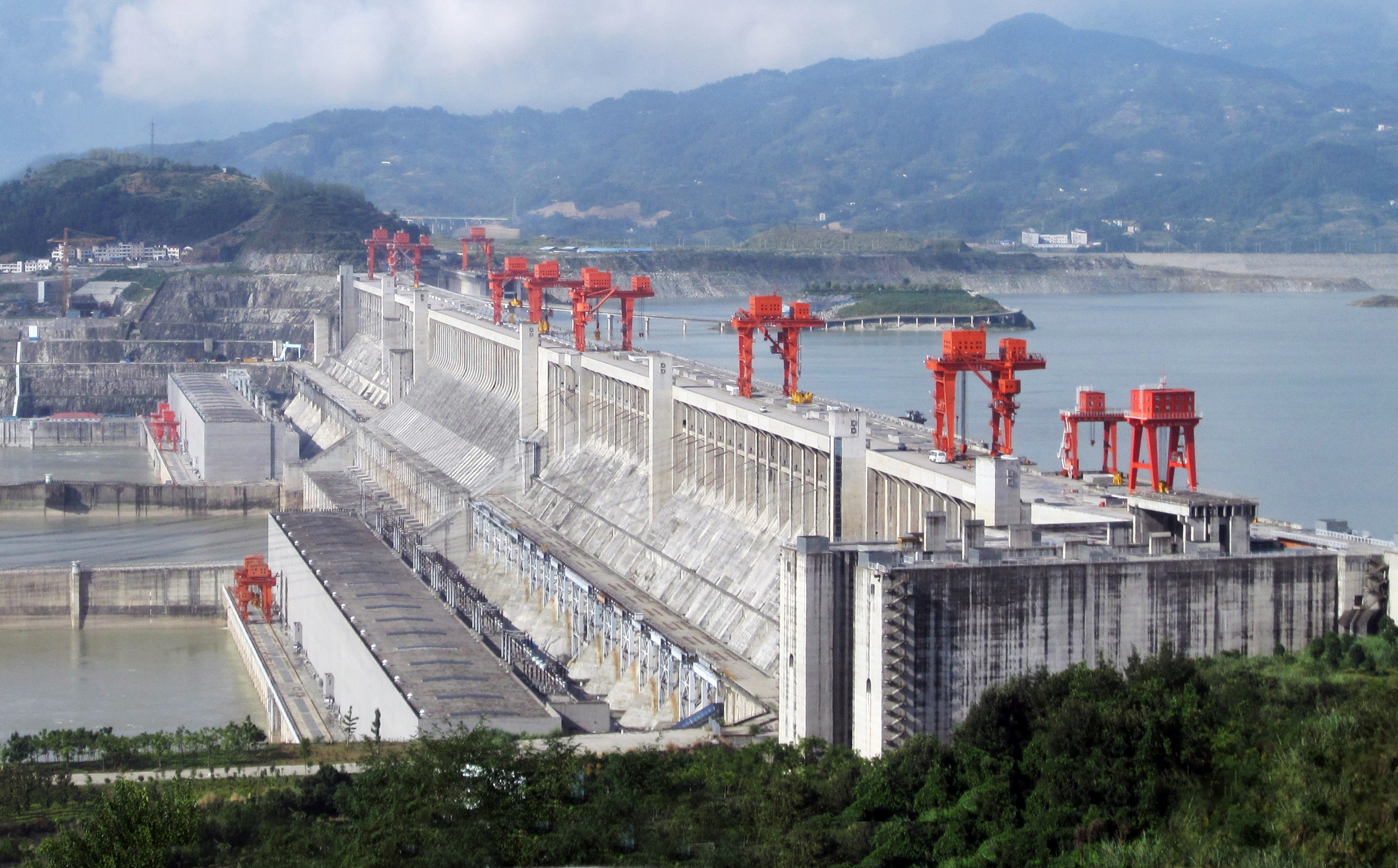
Three Gorges Dam in China displaced 1.4 million people.

Communities that live near a dam and its reservoir are often required to relocate, resulting in major disruptions to their culture and livelihoods. Aswan High Dam displaced 50,000 Nubians and devastated the Nubian community. Danjiangkou Dam (China, 1974) required the forced relocation of 383,000 people. Three Gorges Dam (China, 2003) resulted in the resettlement of 1.4 million people. When Akosombo Dam was built in Ghana in 1965, it created Lake Volta – the largest reservoir in the world (Note: Lake Volta was the largest reservoir in the world, by area, as of 1994.) – which covered 3% of Ghana's landmass. The reservoir displaced 80,000 people, many of whom were forced to find new occupations: farmers became fishermen; fishermen became farmers. Many sites of ancestor worship were submerged, leading families to abandon traditional rituals and customs, which disrupted the social order and caused antisocial behaviors.

Many dam projects require extensive modifications to local infrastructure. New housing may be built for workers, and electrical power transmission lines will be needed if the dam produces hydroelectricity. Dams may impact transportation: bridges and roads may need to be created or re-routed, and the reservoir may promote the growth of weeds that impede boat traffic. Dams and their reservoirs can increase the prevalence of water-related diseases such as schistosomiasis, malaria, and onchocerciasis.

=== Water scarcity and international conflict ===
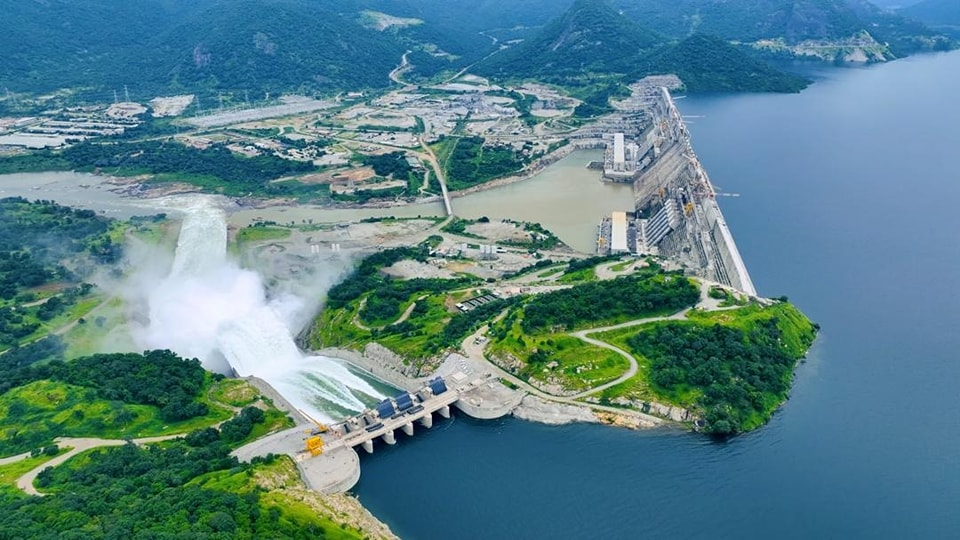
Ethiopia built the Grand Ethiopian Renaissance Dam on the Blue Nile River in 2020, over the objections of Egypt and Sudan.

Water scarcity is a major global issue affecting countries such as China, South Korea, India, Belgium, South Africa, Algeria, Jordan, and Rwanda. Water withdrawals from some rivers are so extensive that river flows are severely depleted before reaching their delta, including Indus River (Pakistan), Colorado River (US), and Yellow River (China). In response to concerns about water shortages, some countries have pursued dam construction projects to enhance water security and advance long-term strategic objectives. When a dam is built on a river that flows into other nations, downstream nations are often concerned about the dam's effects on water availability and river flow, as well as the risk of dam failure. (Note: Studies have analyzed potential flood damage to Sudan and Egypt in the event that Ethiopia's Grand Ethiopian Renaissance Dam were to fail.) Such dams can lead to international conflict between the upstream and downstream nations, particularly when the downstream nations are facing water scarcity problems.

Notable disputes about dams include Turkey's Southeastern Anatolia Project, a major water project which includes many dams, one of which is Karakaya Dam. Most of these dams are on the Euphrates and Tigris rivers, which flow downstream into neighboring nations Syria and Iraq. These downstream nations have protested to Turkey about potential water supply issues. The Indus River is the primary river of Pakistan, with headwaters in several countries, including India. India built large dams on the Indus over the opposition of Pakistan, including the Baglihar Dam and Kishanganga Dam. The Mekong River traverses several countries. China built many dams on the river without the consent of the downstream nations, including Xiaowan Dam and Nuozhadu Dam. The Nile River has been the source of tensions between the arid downstream nations (Egypt and Sudan) and the upstream nations where most of its water originates as rainfall. In 2020, Ethiopia completed Grand Ethiopian Renaissance Dam (GERD) on the Blue Nile, in spite of opposition from Sudan and Egypt.

== Design ==
=== Design process ===
The dam design process can be executed in three stages: reconnaissance, feasibility, and project planning. In the reconnaissance stage, designers visit the site, study it carefully, and gather geological, seismic, and topographic data. In the feasibility stage, detailed technical investigations are performed to assess the geology, hydrology, and hydraulics of the site. Analysis of environmental and flood impacts begins, and inquiries are made into land acquisition, public utility availability, and construction material sources (such as rocks and soil for fill material). In the planning stage, detailed plans are created, a construction schedule is established, and cost estimates are prepared.

=== Technical investigations ===
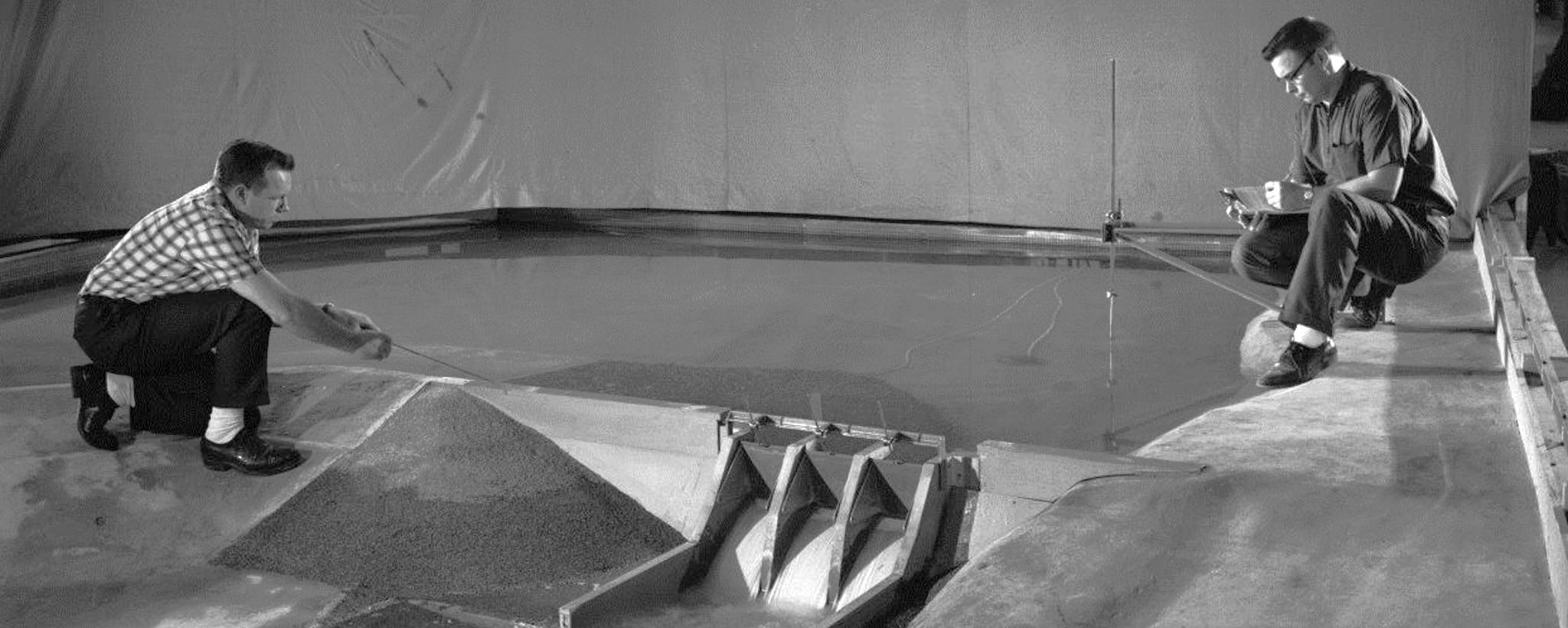
Dam engineers often use scale models to evaluate dam designs. This is a model of Tellico Dam in the US.

During the planning process for a dam, a large number of technical investigations are typically conducted. These investigations may be categorized as topographic, geological, and hydrological. Topographic investigations survey the dam site and use the data to prepare detailed topographic maps of the region. Every aspect of the dam's design will rely on the maps, so they must be very precise.

Geological investigations study the rocks and soil of the dam site. The dam – and the water it impounds – exerts immense forces on the valley walls and on the ground beneath the reservoir and dam structure. An accurate understanding of the strength of the ground, and identifying any faults, is essential to minimizing seepage and reducing the risk of dam failure. The geological research must also assess the likelihood and magnitude of earthquakes.

Hydrological investigations examine all aspects of water flow in the vicinity of the dam. Data are produced that identify the size of the upstream watershed and annual precipitation. Studies are performed to determine how much water flows through the dam site in an average year, and how much it varies within a year and between years. These data are used to predict the frequency and magnitude of floods at the dam site, and to establish the capacity of the dam's spillway.

=== Environmental impact assessment ===
During the design process, developers in many countries are required to prepare an environmental impact assessment (EIA) that documents the effects the dam (and its reservoir) will have on communities and the environment. The EIA enables the developer and government to assess the desirability of a dam, to mitigate its impacts, and to compensate people adversely affected. Mitigations include changing the dam's location, size, or design; compensating those impacted; or cancelling the project altogether.

=== Selection of location, structure, and material ===
Three important decisions made during the dam design process are site selection, the choice of structural type, and the selection of construction materials. These choices require detailed analysis of topography (the shape of the valley), geology (especially as it relates to the strength of the ground below and to the side of the dam), hydrology (flow of water in the valley), availability of construction materials, and potential pathways for spillways. Designers must assess all forces that the dam structure must withstand, including hydrostatic pressure from stored water, ice loads, sediment pressure, temperature-induced stresses, uplift forces, flood events, earthquakes, concrete shrinkage, and the dam's own weight.

The dam location should be chosen so the reservoir will be sufficiently large to meet project requirements. The location should also ensure that the ground is strong enough to support the forces that the dam structure and reservoir water will impose. The site selection must also consider seismic factors: when fault lines are discovered under or near the dam, designers must determine if they pose a risk. (Note: Some fault lines are part of ancient rock systems and are no longer active.)

Selecting the structural type for a dam requires evaluation of a variety of factors. If the dam is placed in a narrow valley, a gravity dam or arch dam may be most appropriate, especially if a tall dam is required. However, an arch dam can only be used if the walls of the valley are strong enough to support the large forces that the sides of the arch will impose. A gravity dam structure is only feasible if the ground under the dam is strong bedrock. Most gravity dams and arch dams are made of concrete, which is generally more expensive than earth or rock, and may influence the design choice. If the dam must span a wide valley, an embankment dam is often the best choice. Rockfill embankment dams are appropriate if rock is plentiful near the site, and an earthfill embankment dam may be used when rock is not available. For any embankment dam, an ideal site will be near impervious materials – such as clay – which can be used as a core layer within the dam.

The following table lists some factors that designers consider when selecting a structural type.

Selection of structural type
Structure	Advantages	Characteristics and drawbacks
Embankment dam	• Dam can be built on sand or dirt because its weight is spread over a large area • Little excavation required • Low sensitivity to earthquakes • Settlement of ground beneath dam is acceptable • Materials for dam may be found locally	• Appropriate for: low-to-medium height dams in a wide, low valley without bedrock • Large amount of material required • Separate spillway must be built
Gravity dam	• Minimal stress within concrete • Integrated spillway possible • Handles temperature fluctuations well	• Appropriate for: dams of any height, in a narrow or wide valley • Requires bedrock foundation • Requires a large amount of expensive concrete • Sensitive to earthquakes and ground settlement • Refrigeration may be required while curing • Large amounts of excavation
Buttress dam	• Uses less concrete and has fewer cooling issues (vs gravity dams) • Minimal ground settlement issues • Integrated spillway possible	• Appropriate for: low-to-medium height dams on bedrock • High sensitivity to earthquakes • Face of dam sensitive to temperature changes • Large amount of excavation • More formwork and labor (vs gravity dams)
Arch dam	• Little concrete required • Less excavation needed • Earthquake tolerant • Few concerns with ground settlement	• Appropriate for: tall dams in a narrow valley that has strong, steep walls and can accommodate a separate spillway • High stress within concrete • Complex and risky abutment where dam meets valley walls • Spillway placement may be difficult

=== Aesthetics ===
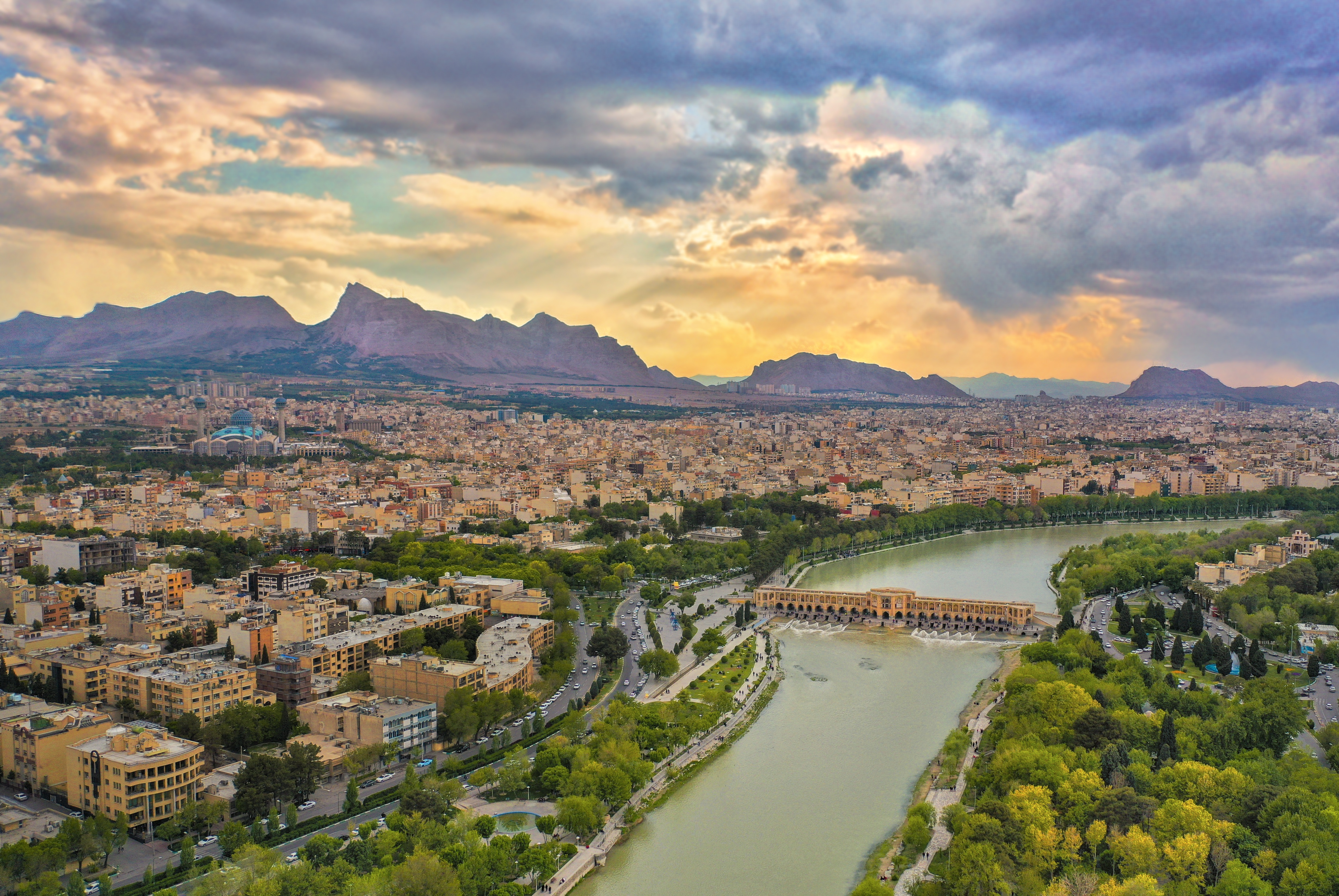
Khaju weir and bridge in Iran is noted for its beauty.

A dam's appearance can be a factor when evaluating potential designs. An early advocate for aesthetically pleasing dams was British architect Charles Fowler, who gave a speech in 1929 that identified Roosevelt Dam and O'Shaughnessy Dam as examples of beautiful dams. (Note: Although the aesthetics of dam design did gain attention during the 20th century, at the end of the century many works on dams contained little or no discussion of dam aesthetics – including Jansen 1988, Schnitter 1994, Siddiqui 2009, and Schleiss 2022.) Fowler asserted that dams with some curvature, particularly arch dams, tend to be perceived as more attractive than those designed with entirely straight lines. The Swiss civil engineer Nicholas Schnitter observed that – although attractive dams are desirable – beauty is a matter of taste, making it difficult to determine if a particular plan will improve the pre-dam landscape. After WWII, the popularity of concrete as a building material gave dam designers more flexibility to create pleasing dam shapes.

In addition to aesthetics, dams can also serve as symbolic monuments that provide a sense of civic pride and cultural identity. Notable examples include Hoover Dam (US, 1936), Bratsk Dam (USSR, 1967), Three Gorges Dam (China, 2003), and Aswan High Dam (Egypt, 2020).

== Auxiliary structures ==
=== Power plants ===
Hydropower dams

In this typical hydroelectricity installation of a dam, shown in cross-section, the water flows from left to right.

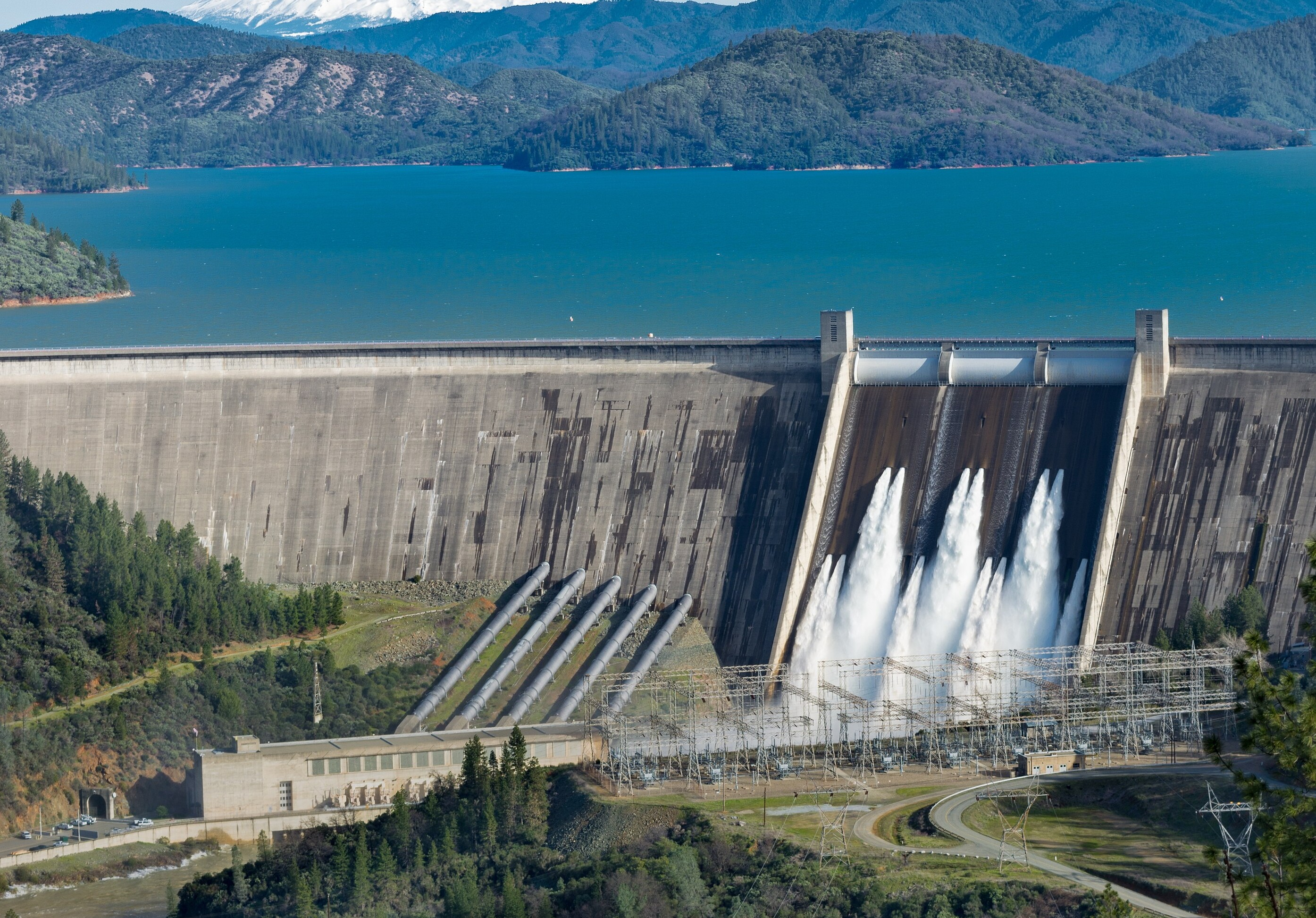
The generators of this dam are in the low, horizontal building lower-left. Five penstocks feed water from the reservoir into the generators.

Many dams include power plants that run water through a turbine connected to a generator to produce electricity. (Note: Some hydropower plants – called "run-of-the-river" plants – operate without a dam or reservoir: a long channel diverts some water from a river and carries it to a downstream location, where the hydropower plant is located.) The generator is typically located near the bottom of the dam, enclosed in a powerhouse. Some powerhouses are located inside the dam structure – often in hollow gravity dams – particularly when no land is available downstream.

Designing a hydropower facility for a particular dam requires analysis of the amount of electricity desired, the amount of water available to feed into the turbine, and the height of the upstream water level above the generator (this height is called the "head"). These factors determine which turbine style is optimal, such as Francis turbine, Pelton turbine, or Kaplan turbine.

Water is guided to the generator from upstream (often from a reservoir) via a passage – called the penstock – that feeds the water into the generator, which uses the force of the water to rotate a turbine and generate electricity. (Note: The channel that conveys water to the generator may consist of two parts: the headrace (a horizontal channel that is not under pressure); and the penstock (a sloping or vertical channel that must be strong enough to withstand the weight of the water). The intake is always covered with a trash rack (grate) at the top to prevent debris from reaching the generator.)

=== Spillways and gates ===
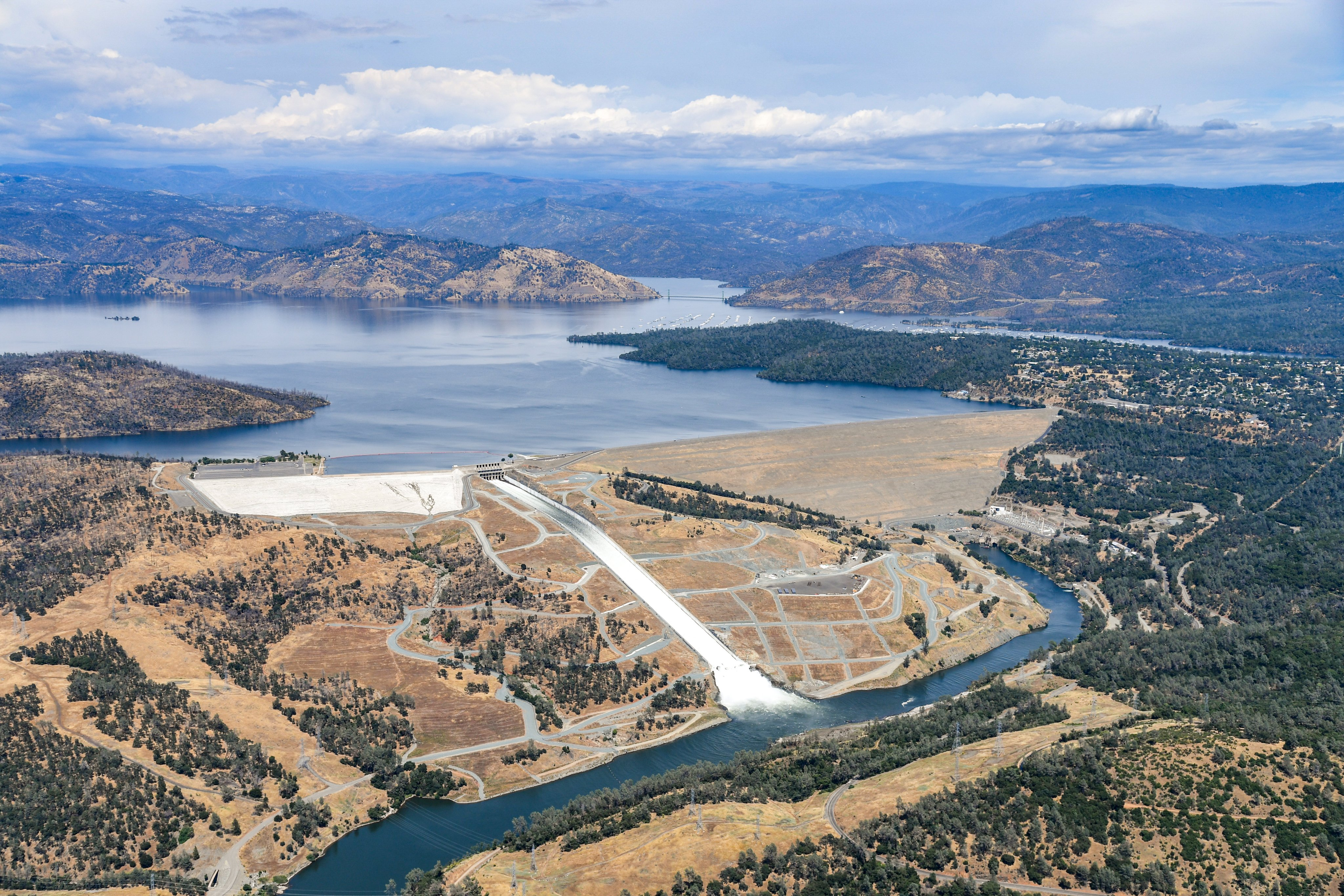
The Oroville embankment dam in the US is the large rock structure in the middle of the image. Overflow water from the reservoir is cascading down the spillway on the left side.

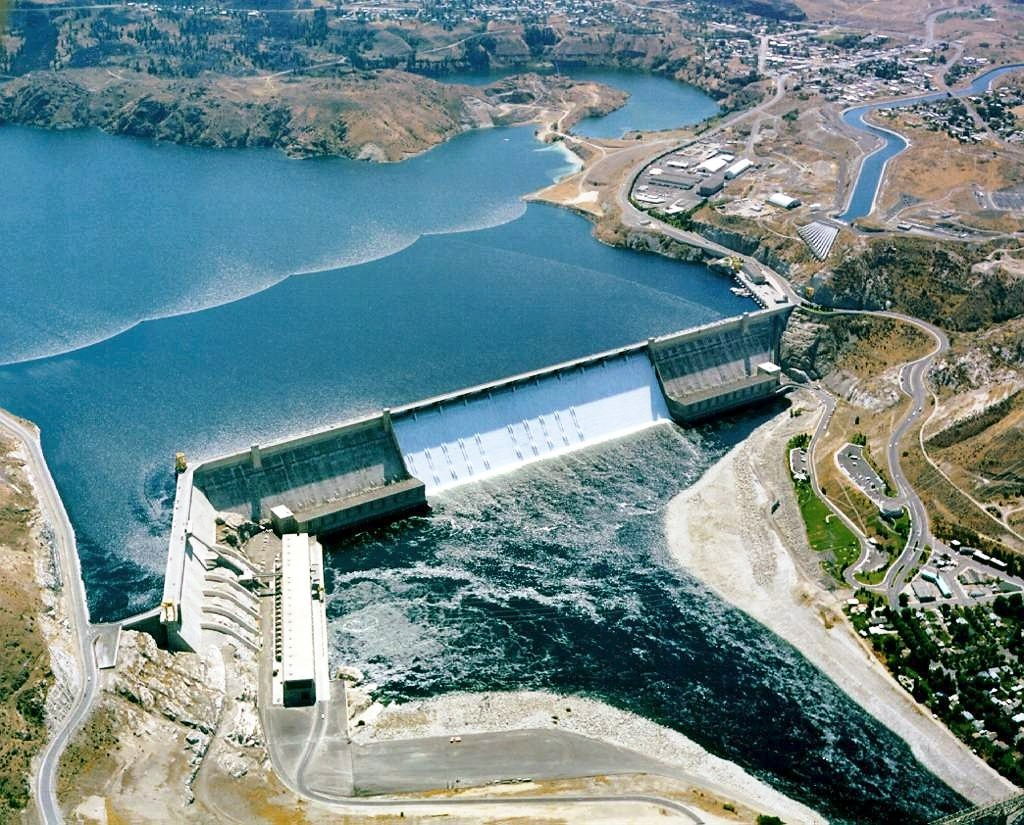
The spillway of Grand Coulee Dam is integrated into the main structure of the dam.

Many dam projects include spillways, which provide a controlled release of excess water from the reservoir into the river downstream, preventing the dam from overflowing and possibly failing.

Unusually heavy rainfall upstream might cause the reservoir to overflow, which could lead to significant damage to the dam structure or even total failure. To mitigate that risk, spillways must be large enough to safely transfer the overflow downstream. Dam designers must perform a detailed analysis of the variability of the region's rainfall and flooding, and use that data to design the spillway's capacity to handle a specific maximum flood. For small dams, spillways are typically designed to safely handle the largest flood expected to occur once in 100 or 500 years. Large dams are typically required to handle the largest flood expected to occur once in 10,000 years.

There are several ways to integrate spillways into a dam project. Concrete gravity dams may position the spillway directly on the dam structure. Some dams locate the spillway at a low point (saddle) of the ridge surrounding the reservoir. These saddle spillways convey the water via a channel or tunnel to discharge downstream of the dam. An unusual spillway design is the bell-mouth, (Note: Also called a "shaft" or "morning glory" spillway) which is a vertical shaft in the interior of the reservoir that leads to a tunnel discharging downstream.

To operate effectively, a spillway must be carefully designed, usually with a parabolic profile at the top. The bottom of the spillway requires an energy-dissipation feature to slow the water before it discharges into the river, thus minimizing damage from erosion. Some spillways use an ogee shape: the spillway starts horizontally at the dam top, becomes steeply inclined in the middle, then curves horizontally at the bottom (ensuring that water is directed away from the dam structure to minimize damage).

Many dams include gates – usually positioned at the top of the spillway – to regulate the water level in the reservoir and control the rate at which overflow water is released downstream. Types of gates include vertical lift gates, drum gates, and radial gates. (Note: On some dams, the dam structure itself acts as a spillway, and the gates are placed on the top (crest) of the dam.)

=== Outlets ===
Dam outlets are structures – usually placed in the lower part of the dam structure – which permit the reservoir to be partially drained. The water level in a reservoir may be lowered to perform maintenance, purge sediment from the floor of the reservoir, generate hydropower, increase the water flow downstream in the dry season, or reduce stress on the dam structure in an emergency situation. Some dam projects create tunnels early in the dam construction process to divert river water around the construction site while the dam is being constructed. Those tunnels are sometimes converted to outlets after the dam is completed.

=== Locks and fish bypasses ===
Auxiliary structures

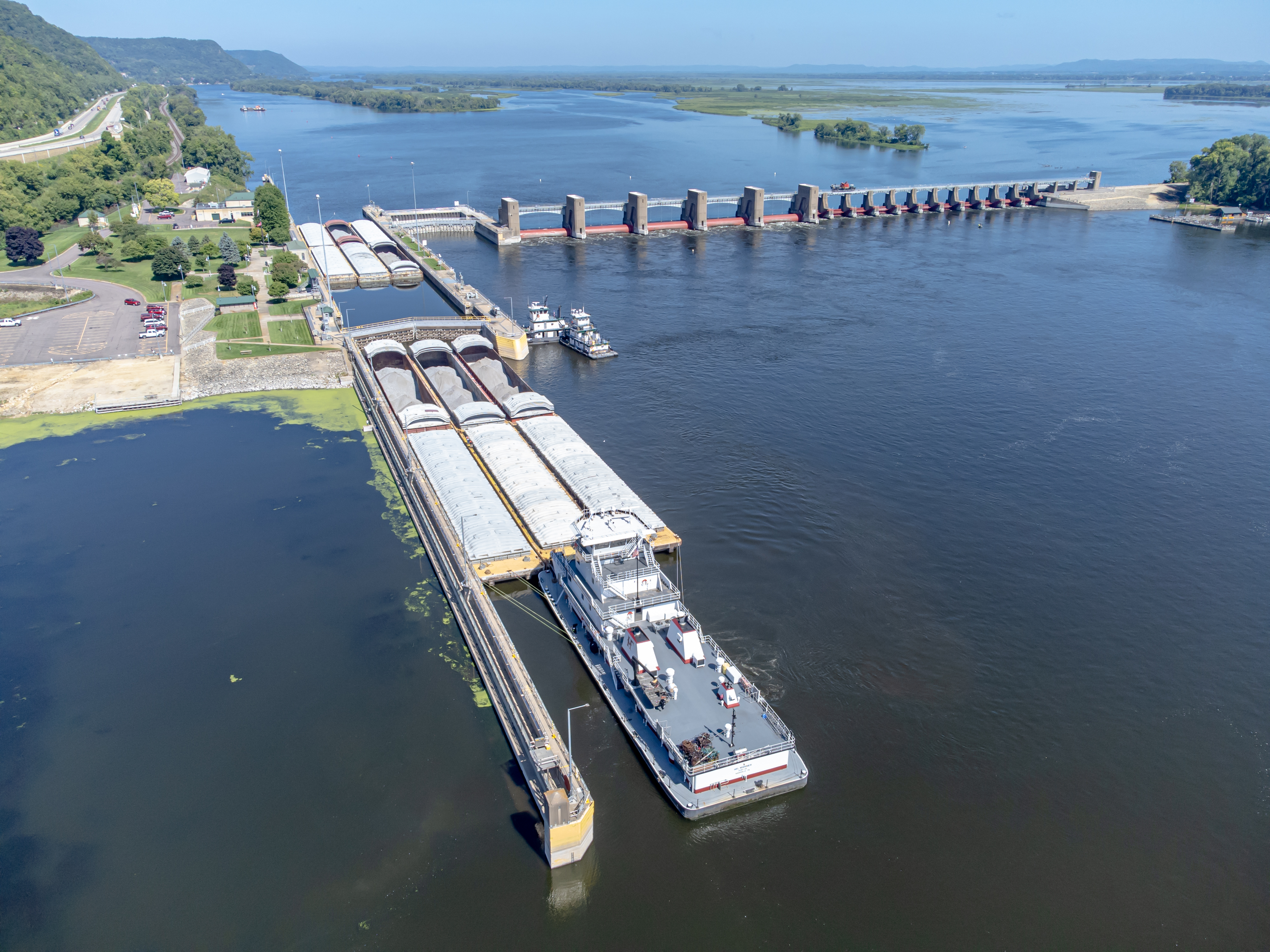
A tugboat is pushing barges into a lock integrated into this dam.

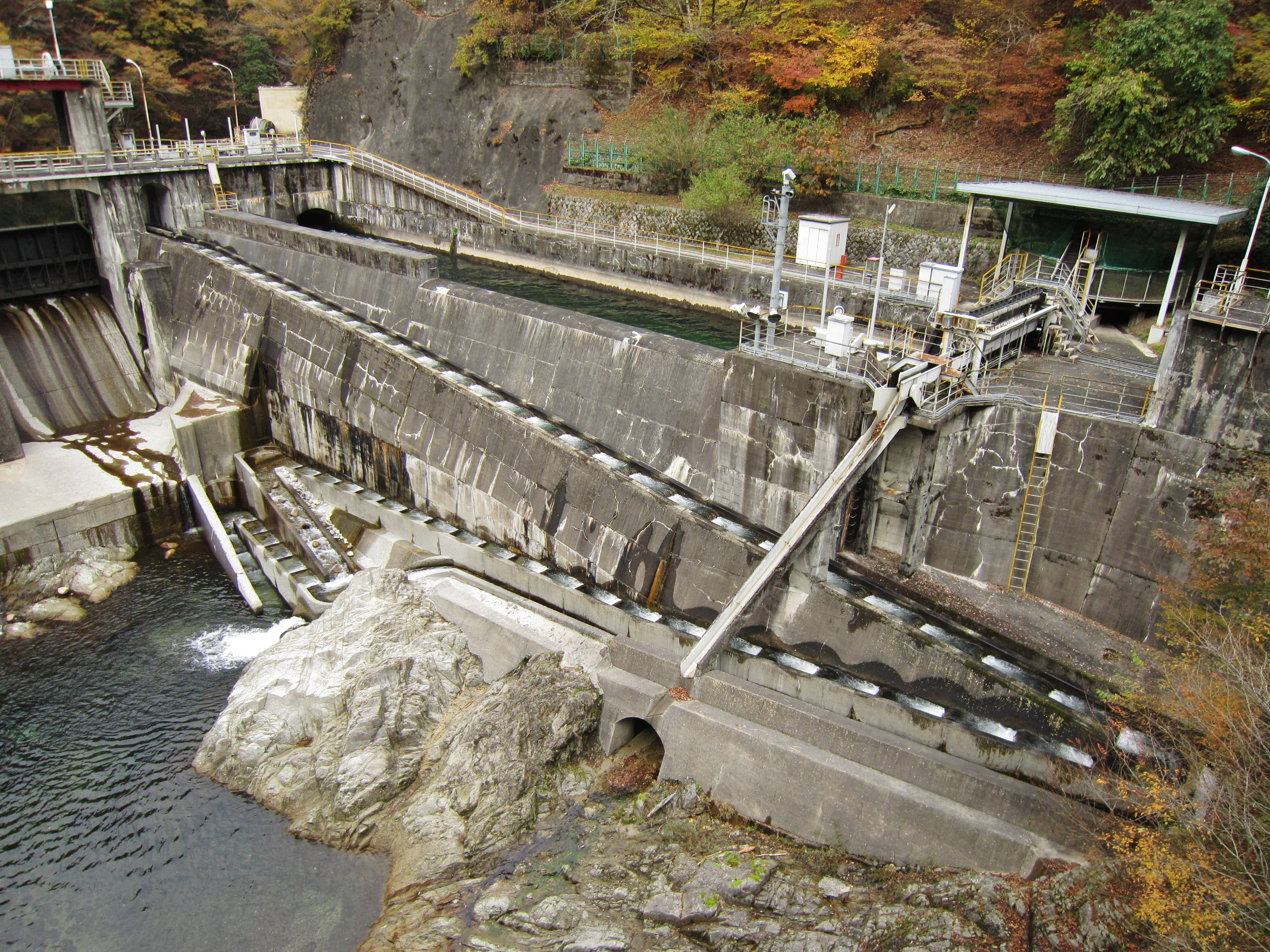
This fish ladder (diagonal steps) enables migratory fish to bypass the Wachino Dam in Japan.

If a planned dam would obstruct a navigable river, locks may be incorporated into the project to enable boats to pass the dam in both directions. Locks consist of one or more rectangular chambers with large gates at both ends and valves that permit each chamber to be filled and emptied.

Some rivers are important migration routes for fish. Construction of a dam on such a river could severely affect fish movement and breeding. These ecological impacts can be mitigated by including a fish bypass facility in the dam project. Fish bypass designs include fish ladders, fish lifts, and artificial streams that mimic a natural river.

== Construction ==
After the design process is complete and the site and structural type are selected, construction may begin. The construction process typically involves diverting the river around the site, excavating the foundation, grouting the underlying rock formations to improve stability and reduce seepage, and placing construction materials to form the dam structure.

=== Cofferdams and diversion of river ===
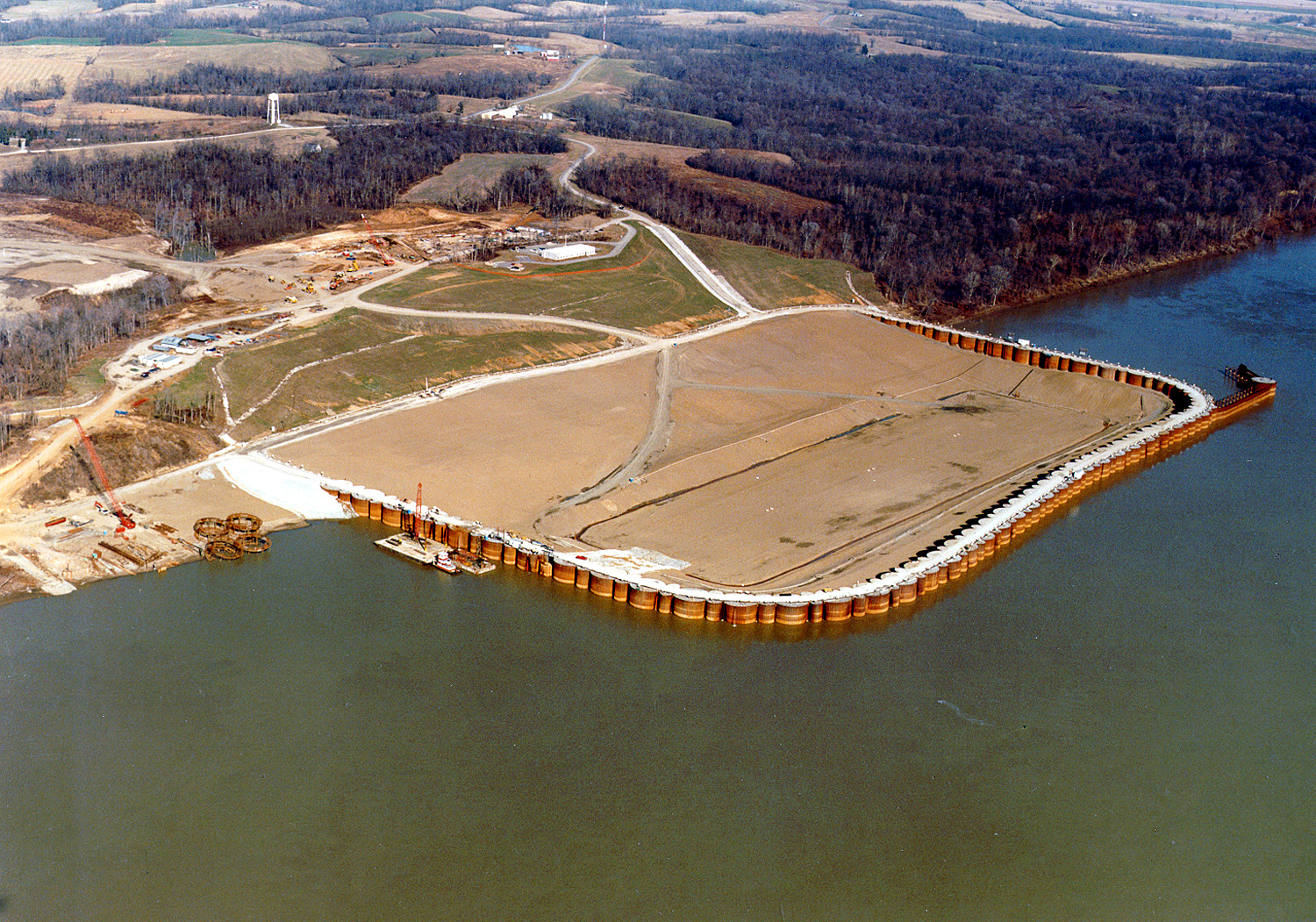
The three-sided barrier projecting into the river is a cofferdam, protecting a dam construction site.

Building a large, permanent dam requires a dry construction site. For dams built across a valley, the river's flow must be temporarily diverted around the construction site. Diversion can be accomplished by building a tunnel or channel around or beneath the dam site, and creating a cofferdam to direct the river into the diversion route. After the dam is completed, cofferdams are usually removed, but for some embankment dams they are incorporated into the final dam. Diversion channels and tunnels are typically plugged up or demolished; although some dam projects retain tunnels or channels as part of the permanent dam project, for example, as an outlet or a spillway.

Another diversion technique is to build a semicircular cofferdam on one side of the valley, which forces the river to the other side. After half the dam is built within the cofferdam, the cofferdam is moved to the other half of the valley, and the river is directed to the first part of the dam (which has passages to let the water through). The second half of the dam is built within the cofferdam, and the cofferdam is removed.

For some embankment dam projects, temporary cofferdams and diversion channels may be avoided by channeling the river into a narrow course in the center of the valley and building the dam inward from both sides of the valley, leaving a gap in the middle for the river to flow through. In the dry season – when the flow of the river is relatively low – the central segment is rapidly closed, while the water simultaneously rises in the reservoir behind the dam.

=== Preparation, grouting, and drainage system ===
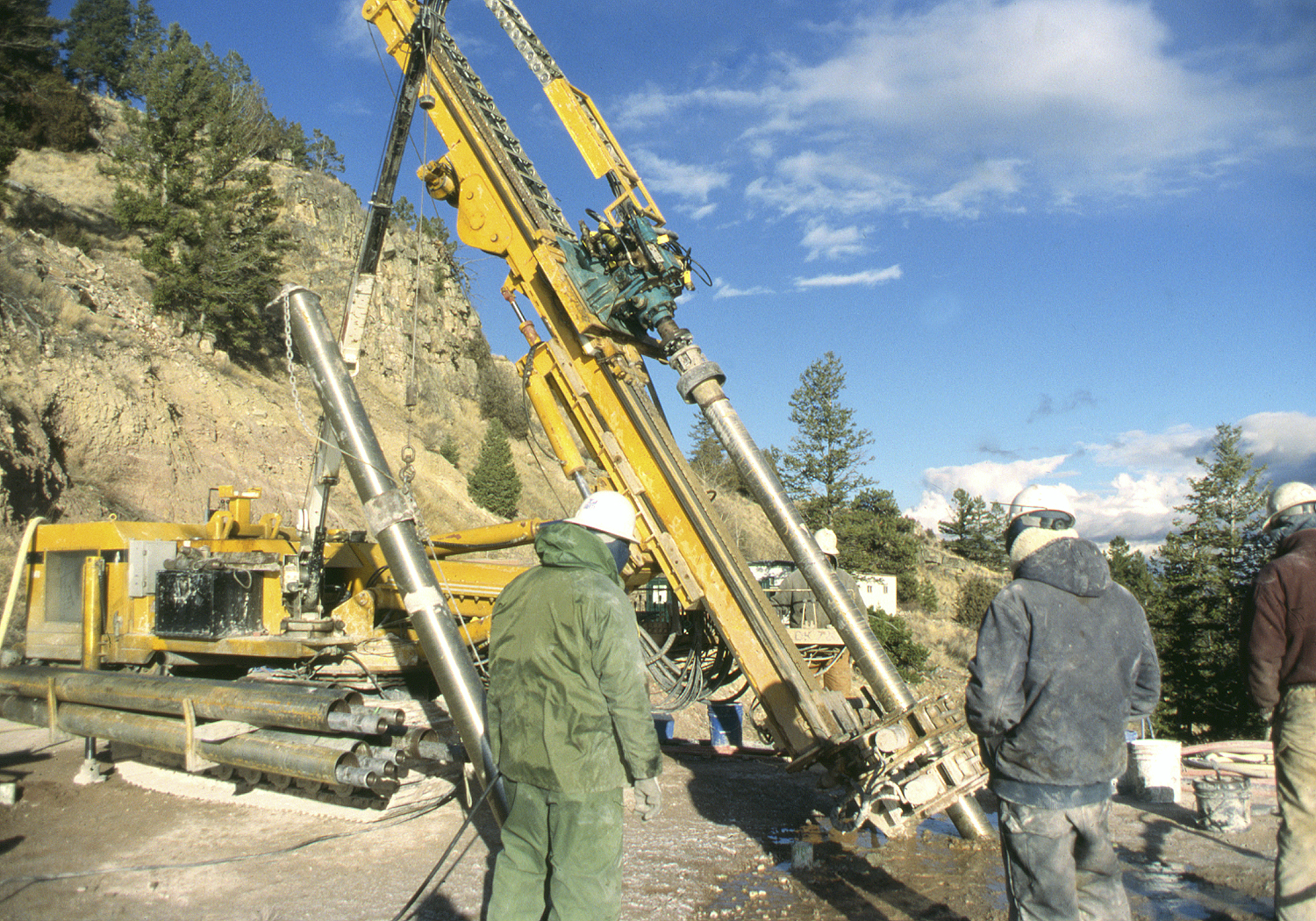
Workers are drilling holes in a dam site. Grout will be injected into the holes to strengthen the ground and reduce water seepage.

An early step in the construction process is preparing the foundation, which is the rock upon which the dam structure will rest. Concrete dams – gravity dams, arch dams, and buttress dams – are very heavy and must rest on solid bedrock. Any soil, gravel, loose rock, or poor-quality rock must be removed to expose bedrock before the dam is built. Embankment dams have wide bases, and do not subject the ground to as much pressure as heavy dams; as a result, they often may be built on loose rocks or soil.

A major risk in any dam project is water seeping under the dam or around its sides. To mitigate that risk, grout is injected – before the dam is built – into the rocks under the dam and into the valley walls on either side. Two types of grouting processes are used: consolidation grouting locates rocks below and to the sides of the dam that may have cracks or defects, and injects grout under high pressure at those locations, filling cracks and strengthening the rocks. The other technique is curtain grouting, which injects grout deep into the rock through boreholes drilled in a pattern arranged to create a solid wall of grout below and to the sides of the dam. The depth of the grout curtain may be 30% to 70% of the planned depth of the water behind the dam.

Another approach to mitigate seepage is a drainage system, which aims to reduce the risk of "piping" (water inside the dam eroding the dam structure) or uplift (water under the dam pushing the dam upward). The drainage system collects water from inside or under the dam and carries it downstream. The drainage may consist of pipes, or a crushed rock "blanket" under the dam. Concrete dams may have passages inside the dam structure to collect water and carry it away; these passages are called "galleries" (horizontal) or "shafts" (vertical).

=== Building the dam ===
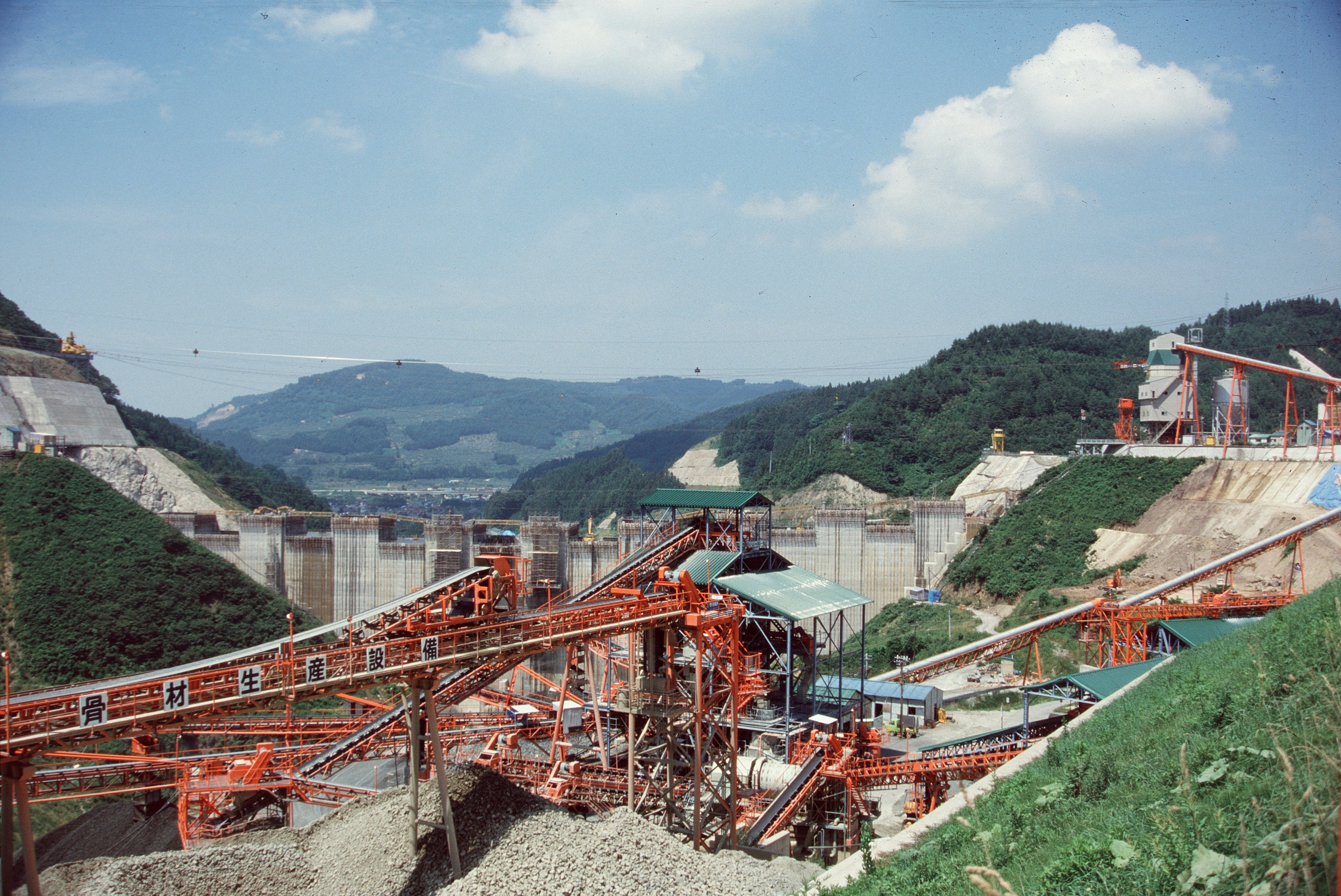
Concrete for this dam (background) is produced by a concrete plant (center of image, covered by corrugated metal roof). Conveyor belts move rocks and concrete around the site.

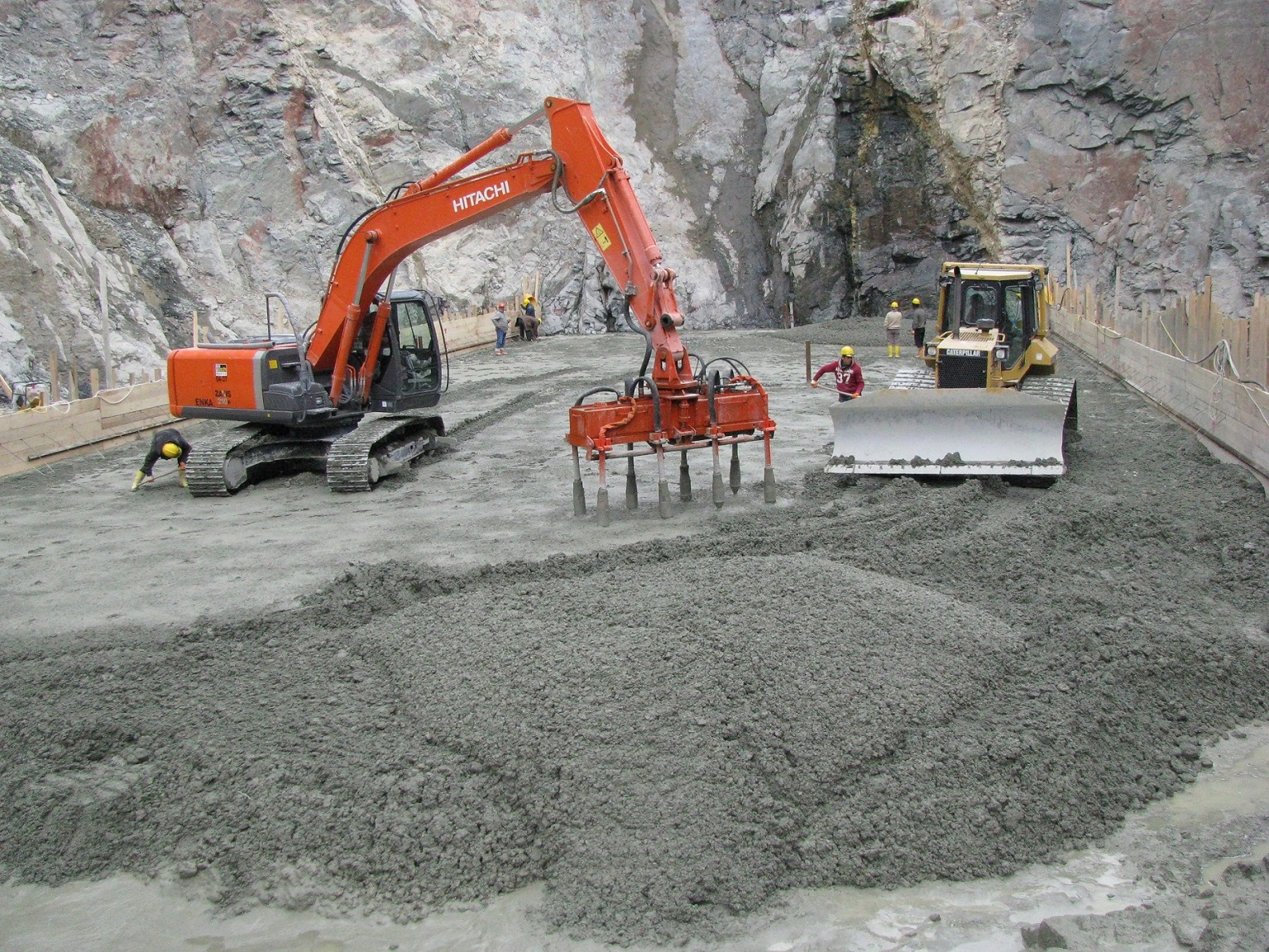
The machine on the left is vibrating the roller compacted concrete of this dam in Turkey.

Embankment dams and concrete dams use distinct construction methods. Embankment dams require vast amounts of soil and rock, which are usually excavated from "borrow areas" near the dam site. The soil and rocks are laid down in successive layers called lifts. After laying down a layer, it is compacted with heavy machinery. The layers must be carefully monitored to ensure that they contain the correct materials, are not overly wet, and are sufficiently compacted. Instruments are embedded within the dam as it is built, and are continually monitored so any defects can be quickly corrected.

Concrete dams require a concrete plant to be built near the dam site. The plant combines aggregate (rocks), cement, fly ash, and water to produce concrete. The concrete is delivered from the concrete plant to the dam structure by means of conveyor belts, concrete buckets, dump trucks, or cranes. Formwork is built at the dam location to contain the concrete when it is placed. After it is placed into the dam structure, the concrete must be vibrated to eliminate any bubbles or air pockets. The dam is gradually built up by pouring individual "blocks" of concrete; each block is typically 1.5 to 3 m (5 to 10 ft) high, and 12 to 30 m (39 to 98 ft) wide and deep. Concrete of such thickness – called mass concrete – contracts and generates a large amount of heat as it cures, which can lead to cracks. To mitigate this issue, expansion joints can be included within the dam to permit the concrete to shrink without cracking. After the heat dissipates, the expansion joints are filled with grout, and their upstream edges are sealed with strips of metal, rubber, or plastic. Additionally, refrigeration systems may be employed that circulate coolant through the concrete by means of pipes.

A recent innovation is roller compacted concrete (RCC), which has several benefits over conventional concrete. (Note: An early roller compacted concrete dam was Shimajigawa Dam in Japan, completed in 1980.) RCC uses less cement, permits the use of aggregate up to 100 mm in size, and does not generate as much heat as conventional concrete. RCC also permits tracked bulldozers to drive on it immediately after placement, and it reduces construction costs because less formwork and labor are required.

== Operation ==
=== Management processes ===
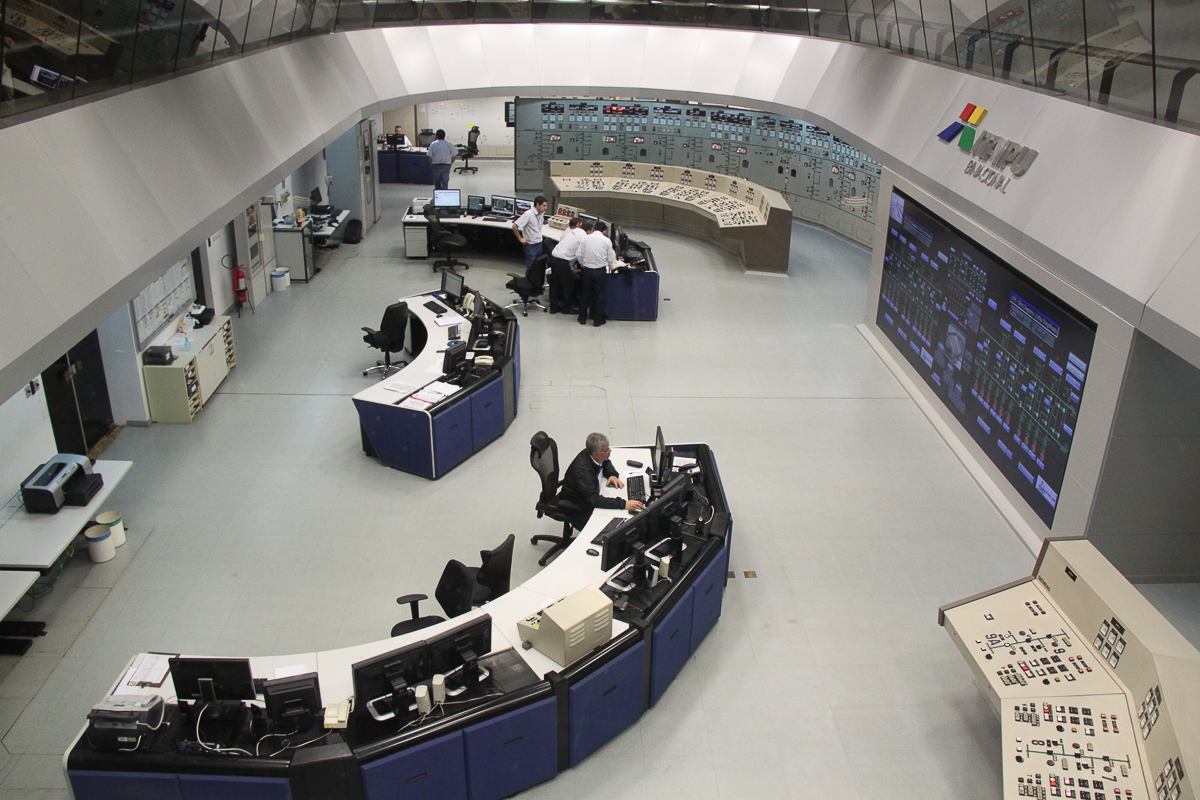
Control room of Itaipu Dam on the border of Brazil and Paraguay

After a dam is completed and becomes operational, management processes are employed to ensure it continues to fulfill its purposes (irrigation, hydropower, etc.), avoids safety incidents, and achieves its intended lifespan. Management processes include performing maintenance and repairs, testing and inspecting facilities, keeping records, and planning for emergencies.

=== Inspection and monitoring ===
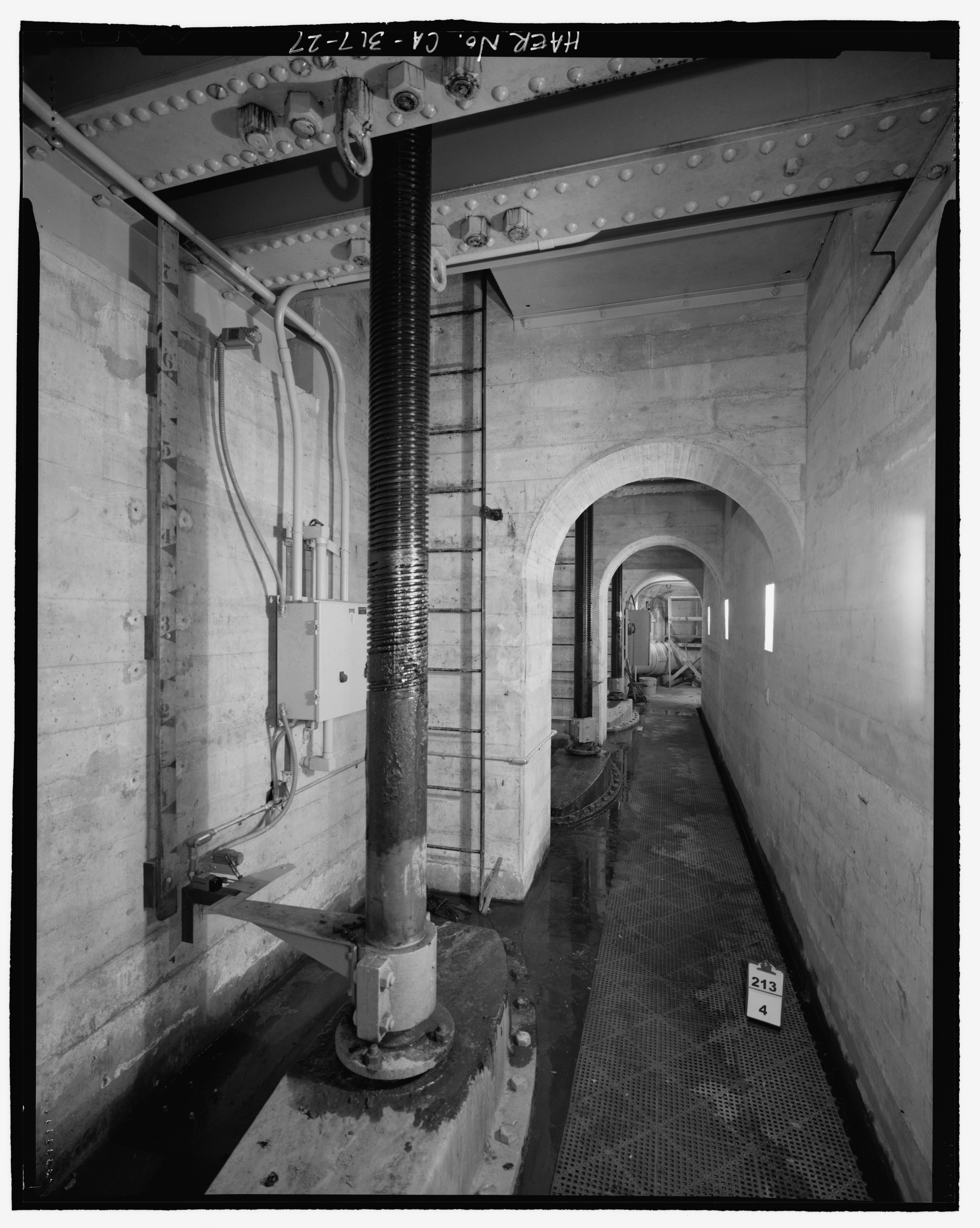
The interiors of some dam structures contain galleries (long, horizontal passages) where operators can inspect for leaks and check monitoring devices.

An essential task of dam operators is surveilling the dam to identify potential safety issues. These inspections monitor stresses acting on the dam, including:

- The reservoir's contents (water, ice, waves, and sediment) acting on the dam structure
- Earthquakes
- Weight of the dam and reservoir compressing the foundation or abutments
- Movements caused by settling of the ground beneath the dam
- Internal compression and tension stresses within the structure
- Expansion and contraction due to temperature fluctuations

These stresses can damage a dam by bending, lifting, expanding, shrinking, or shifting the structure. To detect stresses, permanent instruments are placed within and around the dam. Instruments include tiltmeters, joint meters, strain meters, deflectometers, thermometers, deformation meters, and piezometers. Dam personnel monitor these sensors, and if irregular data are reported, they investigate the underlying cause, and implement necessary repairs or mitigations.

=== Sedimentation of reservoir ===
Most reservoirs gradually accumulate sediment, reducing the amount of water that the reservoir can hold. When the storage capacity is reduced, the dam's ability to perform its intended purposes (irrigation, hydropower, water supply, flood control, etc.) is reduced accordingly. (Note: Sediment in a reservoir's "dead storage" (below the lowest outlet of the reservoir) does not impact the dam's functions. Only sediment in the "live storage" (above the lowest outlet) impacts functionality.) Sediment enters a reservoir as soil suspended in river water; as the river empties into the reservoir, the water velocity decreases, and the sediment settles at the bottom of the reservoir. Sediment can also enter from wind-blown soil, landslides, construction near the water, and erosion from irrigation or rainfall. Roughly half of the world's river sediment is trapped by dams – about 8 to 16 km^{3} per year. To mitigate sedimentation, dam operators implement strategies to reduce sediment inflow. Sedimentation can be reduced by planting vegetation in the reservoir's drainage basin, or by building terraces.

=== Dam removal ===
A dam may be deliberately removed for various reasons: if it poses a safety hazard, if the dam no longer fulfills its original purpose, to restore fish migration routes, or to improve the health of downstream rivers by improving sediment flow. When a dam is removed, fisheries are restored, water and sediment flows are re-established, sediment in the reservoir gradually erodes and flows downstream, the river width increases and braiding is more pronounced, natural water temperatures and animal habitats are restored. (Note: Removing a dam can have drawbacks. For example, removal may enable the spread of invasive species.)

Removal of Iron Gate Dam in the US

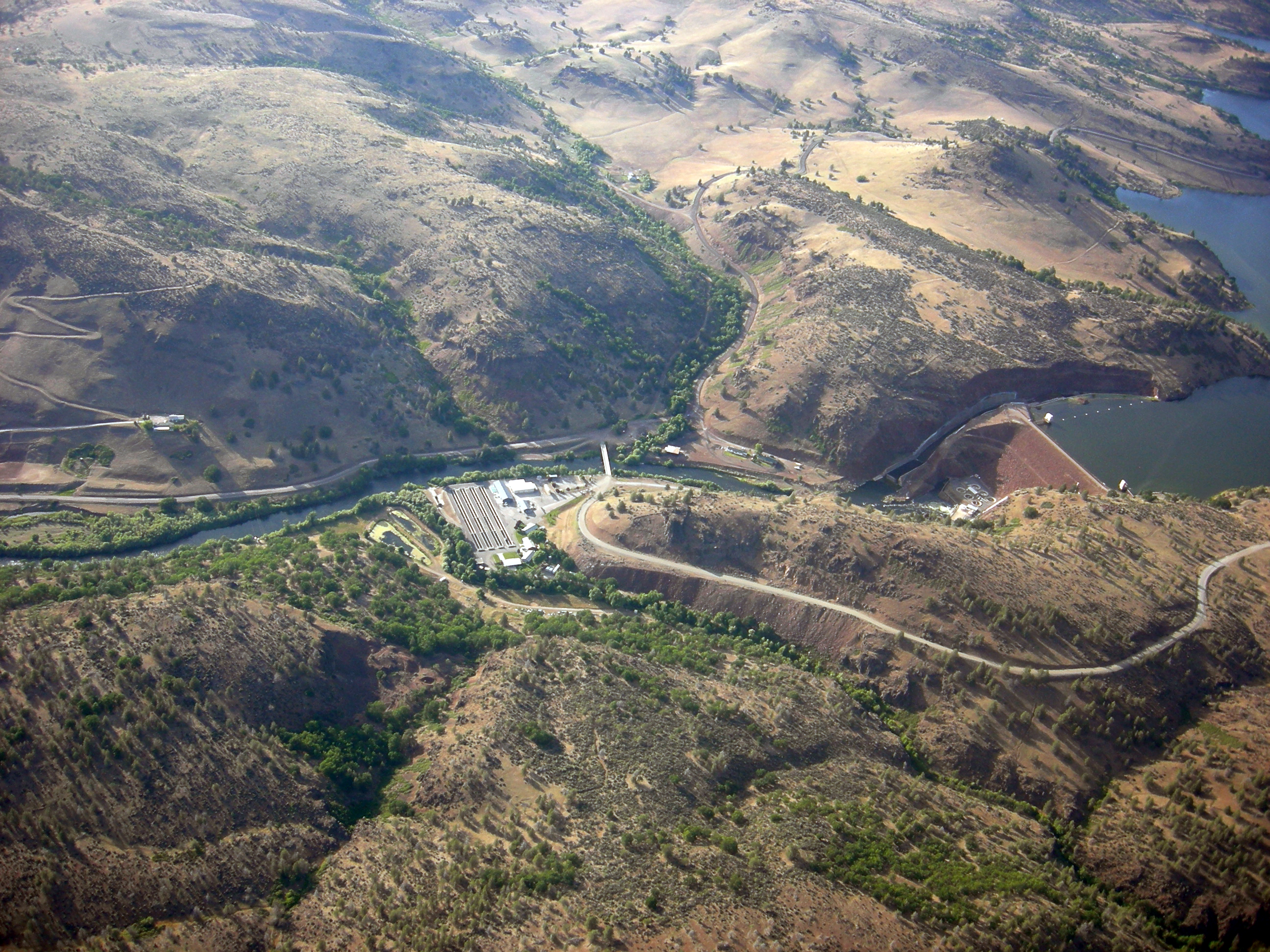
In 2009, before removal

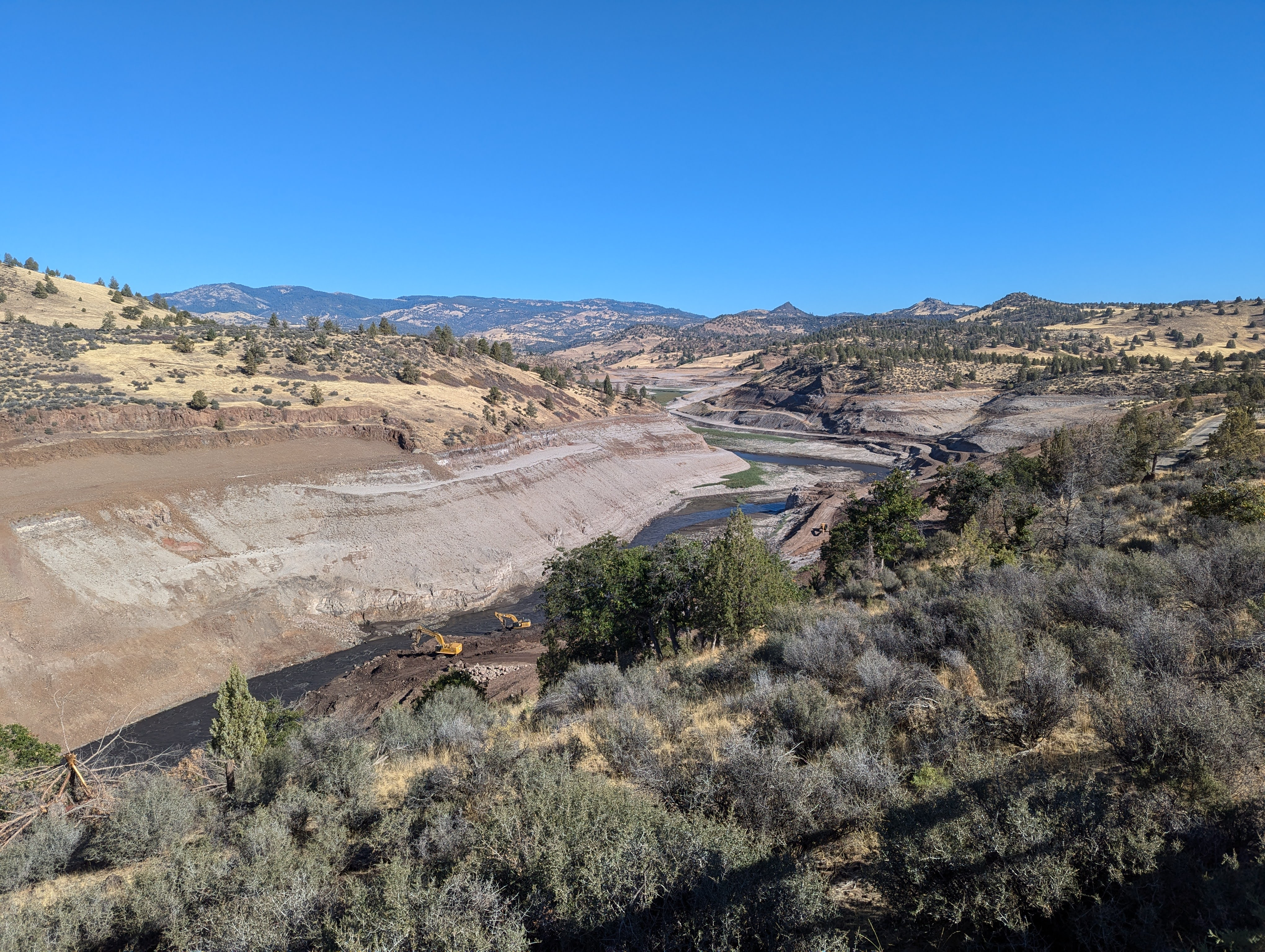
In 2024, after removal

In the US, rivers and streams are obstructed by over 800,000 dams and barriers. Over 1,200 dams have been removed as of 2016, with over 600 removed between 1996 and 2016. Between 2014 and 2018, two dams – Elwha Dam and Glines Canyon Dam – were removed from the Elwha River in the US. The dam removal restored delivery of sediment and wood to the downstream river, and the river delta was re-established. A group of four dams – including Iron Gate Dam – was removed from the Klamath River in the US between 2020 and 2024. The removal was the result of a sustained campaign by Native Americans and environmentalists. One of the goals was to restore one of the largest salmon migration routes on the Pacific coast of North America.

In 2021, there were over 1,000,000 dams and barriers in Europe, at least 150,000 of them no longer required. Dams and the resulting fragmentation of rivers are a major cause of a 55% decline in migratory fish populations and an 80% decline in fish biodiversity. In 2024, the European Union passed the Nature Restoration Law which encourages the removal of unneeded dams. (Note: Europe also produced the Water Framework Directive which addresses water quality of rivers, among other topics.) The Dam Removal Europe organization seeks to identify dams for removal and facilitate the process. (Note: Members of Dam Removal Europe include World Wildlife Fund, The Rivers Trust, The Nature Conservancy, Rewilding Europe, and Wetlands International Europe.) In 2025, over 600 dams were removed in Europe, restoring 3,740 km (2,320 mi) of rivers and streams.

== Dam failure ==
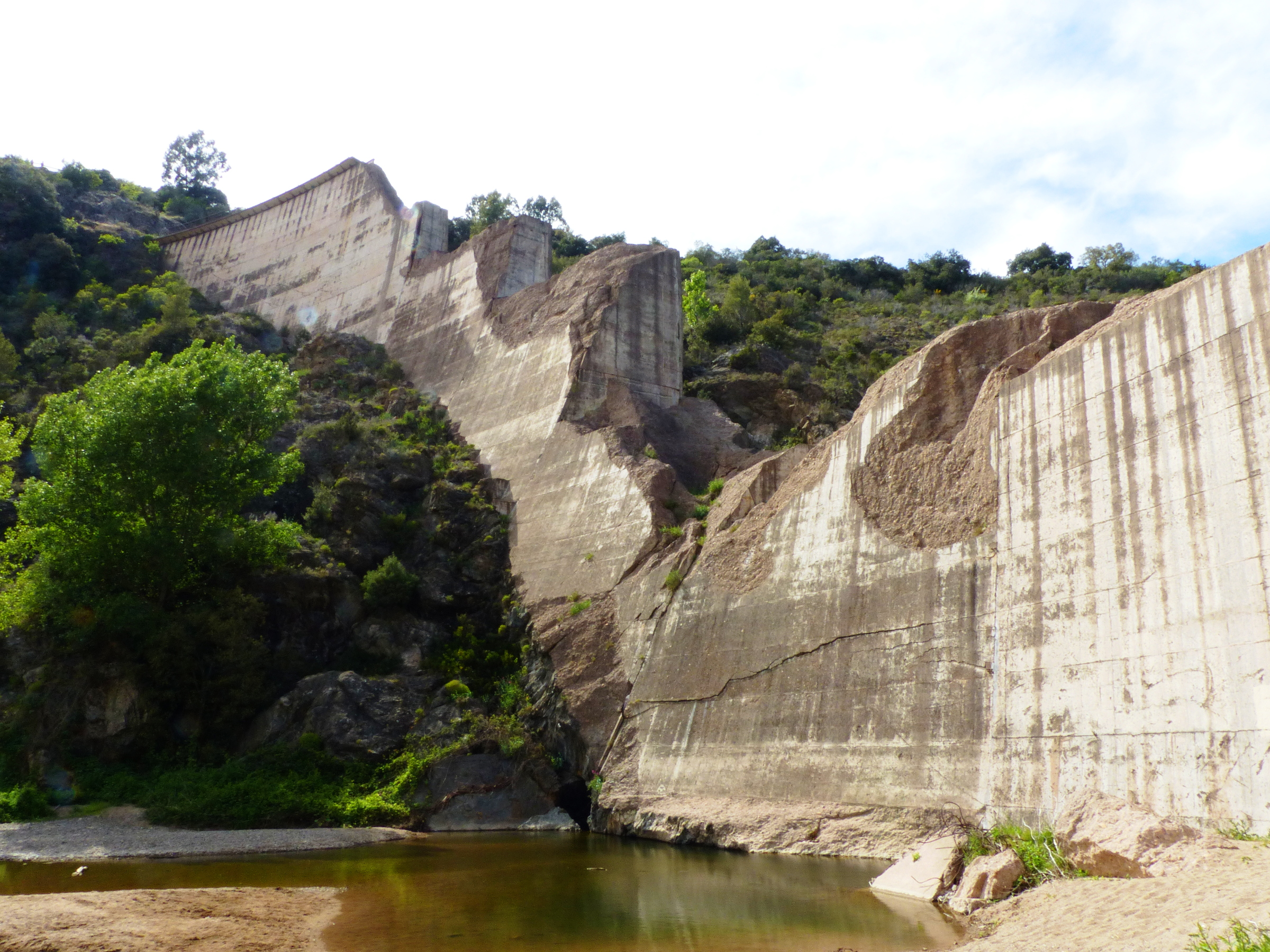
The concrete arch Malpasset Dam failed in 1959 in France.

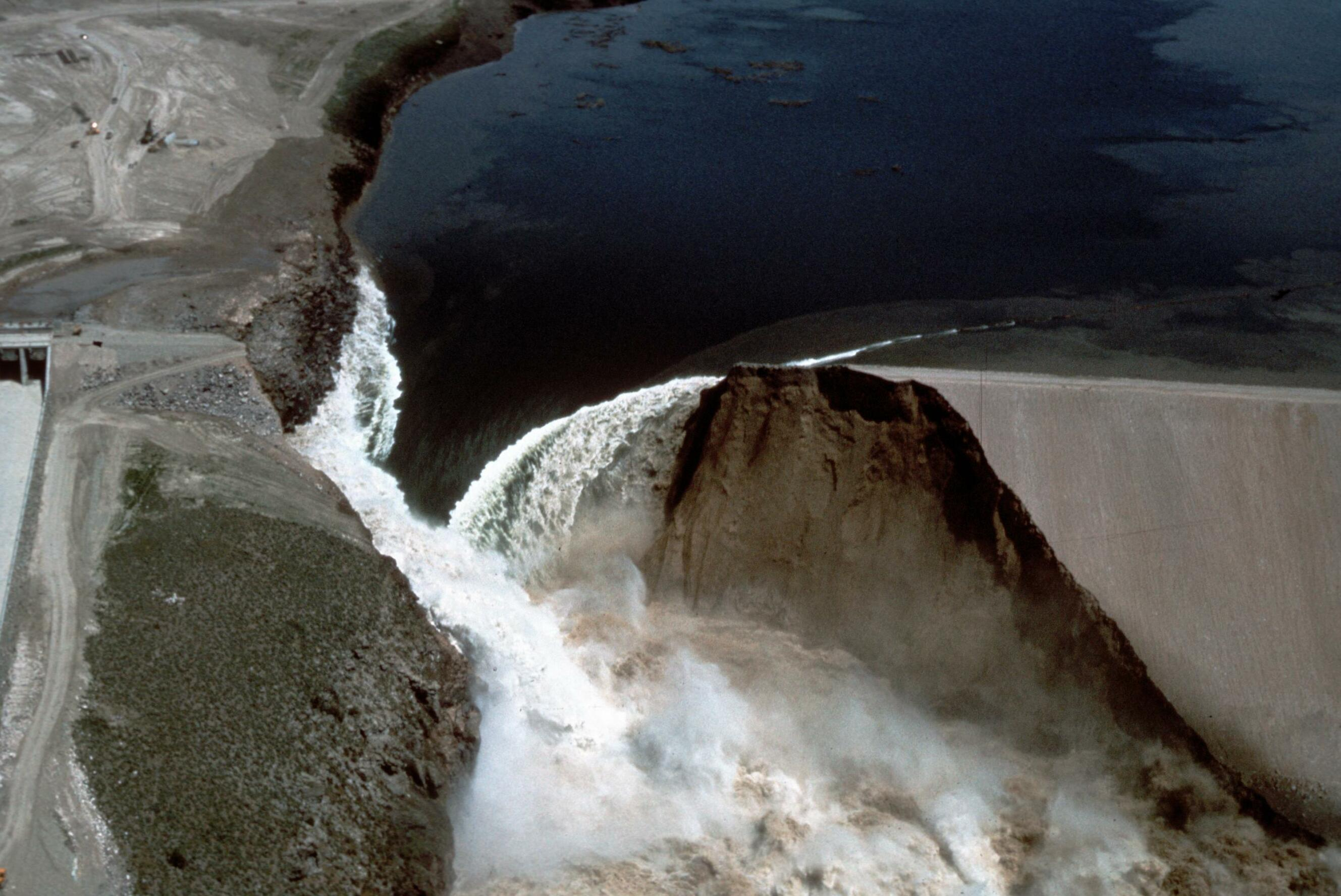
The earthen embankment Teton Dam failed in the US in 1976 due to piping.

Many principles governing the design of safe dams have been developed based on lessons learned from dam failures. Dams can fail for many reasons. Arch dam failures can result from rock weakness at the abutments (where the sides of the dam press into the valley walls), erosion of the foundation under the dam, or shearing (slipping) where the dam meets rock. Gravity dams and buttress dams can fail due to overturning, sliding, cracking, or earthquakes. A risk unique to earthen embankment dams is "piping": a small leak through or under the permeable dam structure gradually erodes the soil, until a small channel is formed, which – if untreated – may lead to dam failure. (Note: Piping problems caused Teton Dam in the US to fail in 1976, killing 11 people.)

A large number of dams failed during the 19th and early 20th centuries, particularly embankment dams. Increased emphasis on dam safety caused failure rates to decrease dramatically throughout the 20th century. (Note: Global dam failure rate measured as "failures per 10,000 years of operation".) Of the dams over 15 m (49 ft) high built after 1900, only 100 had failed by 1994. Although the failure rate decreased, the potential for downstream damage rose due to increasing dam heights and reservoir capacities.

An early dam failure occurred around 2600 BCE, when Egypt's Sadd el-Kafara dam collapsed near completion during a severe flood. (Note: Portions of the Sadd el-Kafara dam near Cairo are still standing.) A modern arch dam failure was Malpasset Dam in France. Its failure in 1959 was not due to the concrete dam's shape or strength, but rather to the presence of an underground slip line which moved due to the combined weight of the dam and the reservoir water. The movement caused the dam to crack, and the resulting flood killed several hundred people downstream.

A dam failure caused by insufficient site investigation was Vajont Dam in Italy. This concrete arch dam was built in a valley that had steep sides which were prone to landslides. Designers failed to fully understand the geology of the valley and built the dam in 1959 – then the tallest dam in the world at 267 m (876 ft). In 1963, a huge landslide slid down the hillside above the reservoir, displacing nearly all the water in the reservoir, and causing a 125 m (410 ft) tall wave to overtop the dam. The resulting flood killed more than 2,000 people downstream. The dam structure itself suffered only minor damage.

In some cases, it is not possible to determine the cause of the failure. In 1963, Baldwin Hills embankment dam in the US failed, but – despite extensive investigations – a definitive cause was not found. Potential factors included: weak foundation soil that subsided; irregular settling of the dam structure; fault lines under the dam; a nearby oil field that was depleted of oil, then later re-pressurized; and the act of emptying and filling the reservoir. One of the deadliest dam failure incidents was the Banqiao and Shimantan multi-dam failure in China in 1975. Typhoon Nina caused extensive flooding in Henan province, leading to the collapse of several dams in the same river system, including the Banqiao Dam and Shimantan Dam. The total number of deaths is estimated between 171,000 and 230,000.

== Society and culture ==
=== Wartime targets ===
Dams have been targeted during wartime, with 20 documented attacks on dams between 1917 and 1993. The Geneva Conventions were amended in 1949 to prohibit attacks on dams if they would cause "severe losses among the civilian population". (Note: The provision prohibiting attacks on dams is in Protocol I to the Geneva Conventions, Article 56.)

=== Profession and regulation ===
Most countries with large dams have statutes or regulations governing dam construction and inspection. The regulations vary widely among nations. Some countries have a government agency responsible for inspecting dams, but many do not. (Note: Nations that do not provide for government inspection rely on the dam owner to inspect the dam.) The regulations of most nations typically do not specify particular dam design parameters, but instead require compliance with "recognized rules of technology" or "state of the art in science and technology". Some countries regulate dams at a federal level, but others regulate at a province/state level. For example, Germany has no federal regulations; instead, each state has its own statutes.

=== Art and culture ===
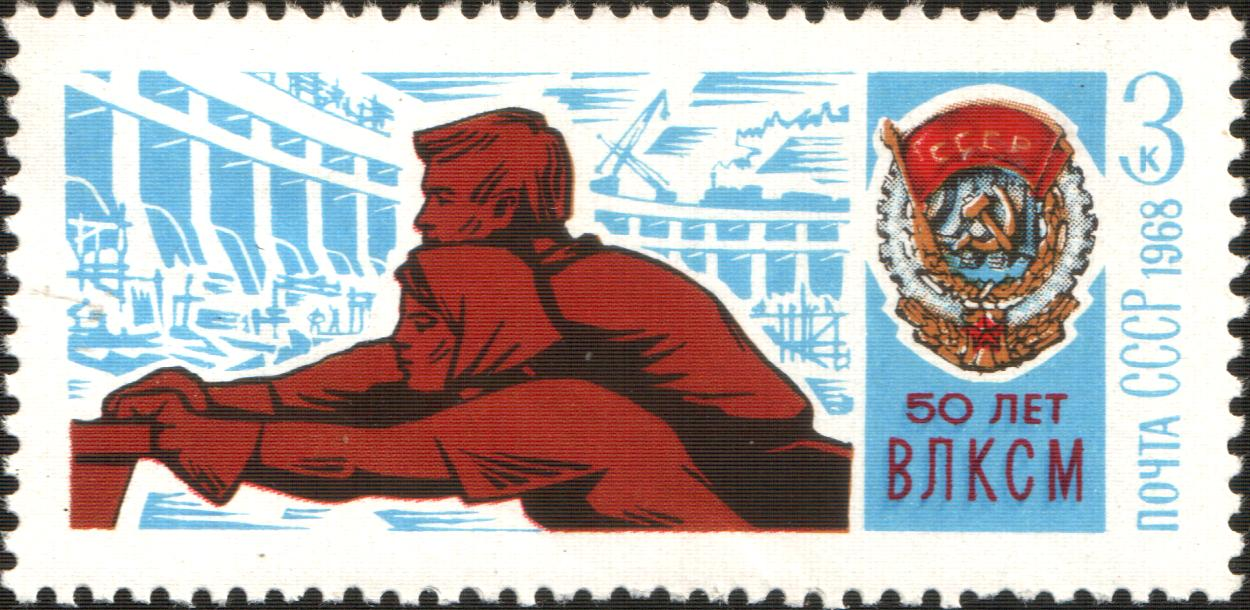
Dnieper dam is shown on this 1968 Soviet stamp.

Dams are featured in novels, movies, documentaries, songs, postage stamps, popular histories, and political posters. In the mid-20th century, Soviet artists such as Isaak Brodsky and Gustav Klutsis highlighted large dams in artworks intended to glorify workers and industry. Their works portrayed Mingachevir Dam, Kayrakkum Dam, Bratsk Dam, and Dnieper Dam.

The docudrama film The Dam Busters (1955) portrayed a WWII military operation in which Britain's RAF successfully bombed Möhne Dam in Germany, causing the deaths of about 1,600 civilians. The Patagonia company produced the documentary DamNation (2014) which advocates for dam removal to restore ecosystems and fish populations.

Books about dams include The Johnstown Flood (1968) by David McCullough – a popular history of an 1889 dam failure and subsequent flood in the US. Edward Abbey wrote the novel The Monkey Wrench Gang (1975) about environmental activists who sought to destroy Glen Canyon Dam.

Folk musician Woody Guthrie wrote the songs Grand Coulee Dam and Roll On, Columbia, Roll On (both 1941) as part of a series he wrote about the Columbia Basin Project. Several popular songs were produced in Ethiopia in the 2010s to raise funds to build the Grand Ethiopian Renaissance Dam.
