= History of dams =

A dam is a structure that impounds water or restricts its flow. An early dam was Jawa Dam in modern Jordan, built around 3000 BCE. The Hittite Empire built several dams in modern Turkey between the 17th and 13th centuries BCE. In the 1st century CE, the Roman Empire began building masonry gravity dams – typically with vertical faces on both upstream and downstream sides. In medieval Europe, dams impounded water that powered water wheels for milling and mining. The process of designing dams began to transform in the late 18th century from an informal practice to an engineering discipline rooted in science. In the 20th century, the widespread availability of concrete and heavy construction machinery led to the creation of many large-scale dam projects worldwide.

== Ancient dams ==
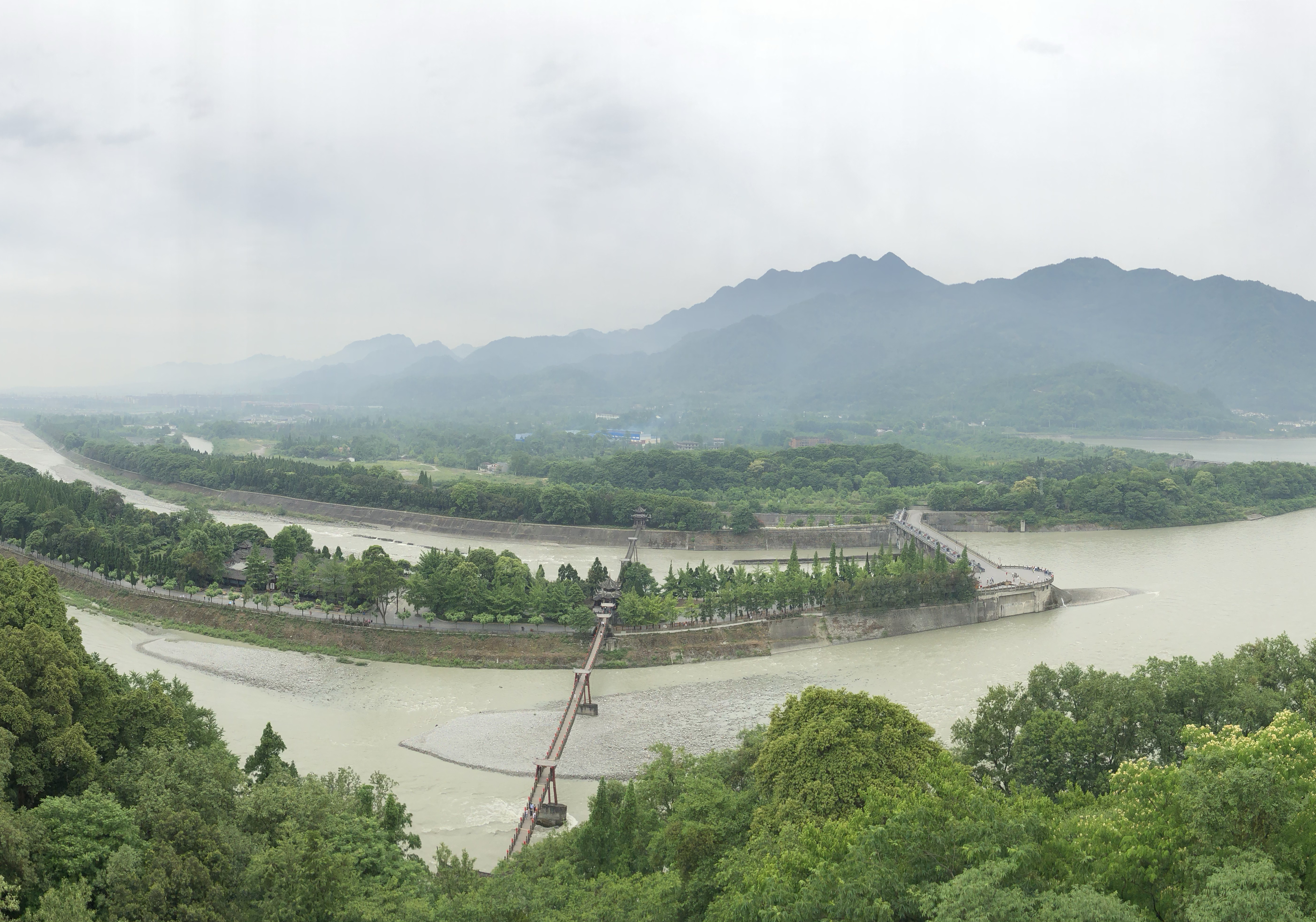
The Dujiangyan irrigation system was initially constructed during the Qin dynasty, around 256 BC.

The earliest known dam is the Jawa Dam near Amman Jordan, built around 3000 BCE. This embankment dam was part of an elaborate irrigation system, and was 5.5 m (18 ft) high and 28 m (92 ft) wide in cross-section. (Note: Traces still remain today.) Around 2600 BCE, Egyptians built the Sadd el-Kafara embankment dam near Cairo, although it failed about the time its construction completed. During the Twelfth Dynasty in the 19th century BC, the Pharaohs Senosert III, Amenemhat III, and Amenemhat IV dug a canal 16 km (9.9 mi) long linking the Fayum Depression to the Nile in Middle Egypt. Two dams called Ha-Uar running east–west were built to retain water during the annual flood and then release it to surrounding lands. The lake called Mer-wer or Lake Moeris covered 1,700 km^{2} (660 sq mi) and is known today as Birket Qarun.

By the mid-late third millennium BC, an intricate water-management system in Dholavira in modern-day India was built. The system included 16 reservoirs, dams and various channels for collecting water and storing it.

One of the engineering wonders of the ancient world was the Great Dam of Marib in Yemen. Initiated sometime between 1750 and 1700 BC, it was made of packed earth – triangular in cross-section, 580 m (1,900 ft) in length and originally 4 m (13 ft) high – running between two groups of rocks on either side, to which it was linked by substantial stonework. Repairs were carried out during various periods, most importantly around 750 BC, and 250 years later the dam height was increased to 7 m (23 ft). After the end of the Kingdom of Saba, the dam fell under the control of the Ḥimyarites (c. 115 BC) who undertook further improvements, creating a structure 14 m (46 ft) high, with five spillways, two masonry-reinforced sluices, a settling pond, and a 1,000 m (3,300 ft) canal to a distribution tank. These works were not finished until 325 AD when the dam permitted the irrigation of 25,000 acres (100 km^{2}).

Eflatun Pınar is a Hittite dam and spring temple near Konya, Turkey. It is thought to date from the Hittite empire between the 15th and 13th centuries BC.

The Kallanai is constructed of unhewn stone, over 300 m (980 ft) long, 4.5 m (15 ft) high and 20 m (66 ft) wide, across the main stream of the Kaveri River in Tamil Nadu, South India. The basic structure dates to the 2nd century AD and is considered one of the oldest water diversion or water regulating structures still in use. The purpose of the dam was to divert the waters of the Kaveri across the fertile delta region for irrigation via canals.

Du Jiang Yan is the oldest surviving irrigation system in China that included a dam that directed waterflow. It was finished in 251 BC. A large earthen dam, made by Sunshu Ao, the prime minister of Chu (state), flooded a valley in modern-day northern Anhui Province that created an enormous irrigation reservoir (100 km (62 mi) in circumference), a reservoir that is still present today.

== Roman engineering ==
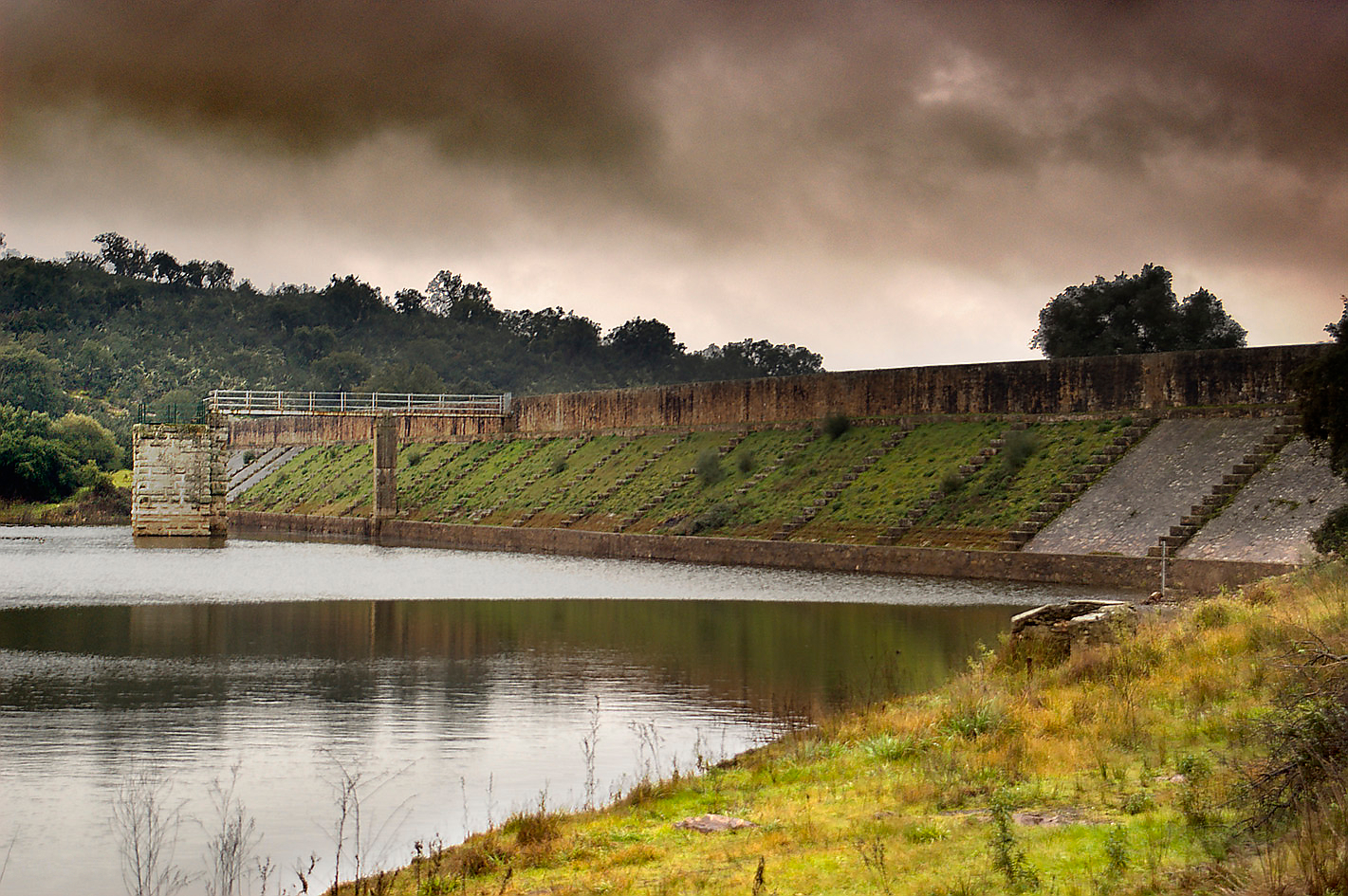
The Roman dam at Cornalvo in Spain has been in use for almost two millennia.

Roman dam construction was characterized by "the Romans' ability to plan and organize engineering construction on a grand scale." Roman planners introduced the then-novel concept of large reservoir dams which could secure a permanent water supply for urban settlements over the dry season. Their pioneering use of water-proof hydraulic mortar and particularly Roman concrete allowed for much larger dam structures than previously built, such as the Lake Homs Dam, possibly the largest water barrier to that date, and the Harbaqa Dam, both in Roman Syria. The highest Roman dam was the Subiaco Dam near Rome; its record height of 50 m (160 ft) remained unsurpassed until its accidental destruction in 1305.

Roman engineers made routine use of ancient standard designs like embankment dams and masonry gravity dams. Apart from that, they displayed a high degree of inventiveness, introducing most of the other basic dam designs which had been unknown until then. These include arch-gravity dams, arch dams, buttress dams and multiple arch buttress dams, all of which were known and employed by the 2nd century AD (see List of Roman dams). The earliest known surviving arch dam is the Iron Gate above Antioch, which combined the functionalities of a road bridge, an aqueduct bridge, a city wall, and a dam. The Iron Gate still functions as a dam in the present day. Roman workforces also were the first to build dam bridges, such as the Bridge of Valerian in Iran.

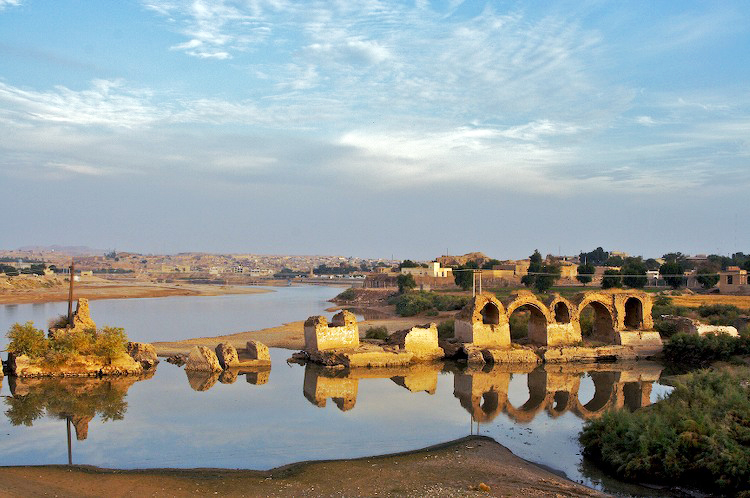
Remains of the Band-e Kaisar dam, built by the Romans in the 3rd century AD

In Iran, bridge dams such as the Band-e Kaisar were used to provide hydropower through water wheels, which often powered water-raising mechanisms. One of the first was the Roman-built dam bridge in Dezful, which could raise water 50 cubits (c. 23 m) to supply the town. Also diversion dams were known. Milling dams were introduced which the Muslim engineers called the Pul-i-Bulaiti. The first was built at Shustar on the River Karun, Iran, and many of these were later built in other parts of the Islamic world. Water was conducted from the back of the dam through a large pipe to drive a water wheel and watermill. In the 10th century, Al-Muqaddasi described several dams in Persia. He reported that one in Ahwaz was more than 910 m (3,000 ft) long, and that it had many water-wheels raising the water into aqueducts through which it flowed into reservoirs of the city. Another one, the Band-i-Amir Dam, provided irrigation for 300 villages.

== Middle Ages ==
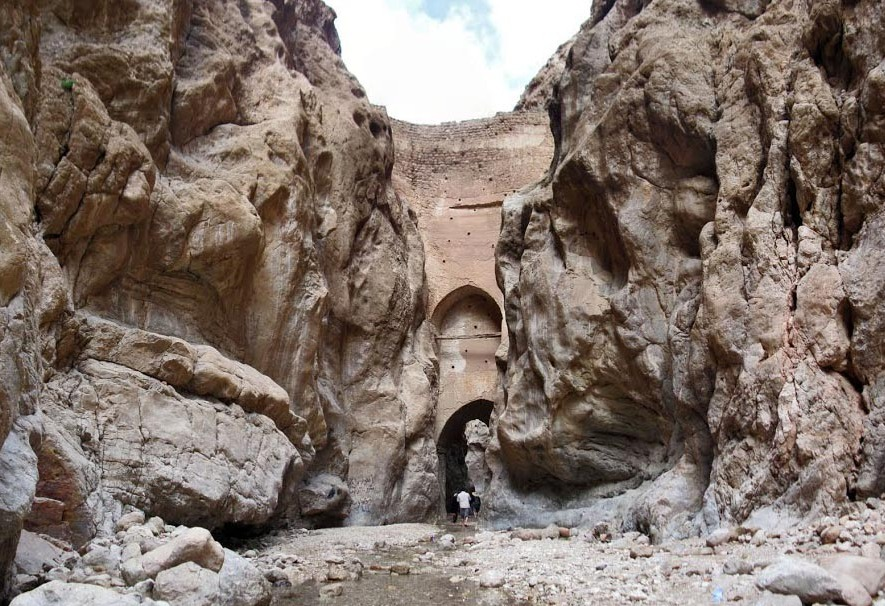
14th c. Shāh Abbās arch dam

Shāh Abbās Arch (Persian: طاق شاه عباس), also known as Kurit Dam, is the thinnest arch dam in the world and one of the oldest arch dams in Asia. It was constructed some 700 years ago in Tabas county, South Khorasan Province, Iran. It stands 60 meters tall, and in crest is a one-meter width. Some historians believe the dam was built by Shāh Abbās I, whereas others believe that he repaired it.

In the Netherlands, a low-lying country, dams were often built to block rivers to regulate the water level and to prevent the sea from entering the marshlands. Such dams often marked the beginning of a town or city because it was easy to cross the river at such a place, and often influenced Dutch place names. The present Dutch capital, Amsterdam (old name Amstelredam), started with a dam on the river Amstel in the late 12th century, and Rotterdam began with a dam on the river Rotte, a minor tributary of the Nieuwe Maas. The central square of Amsterdam, covering the original site of the 800-year-old dam, still carries the name Dam Square.

== Industrial Revolution ==
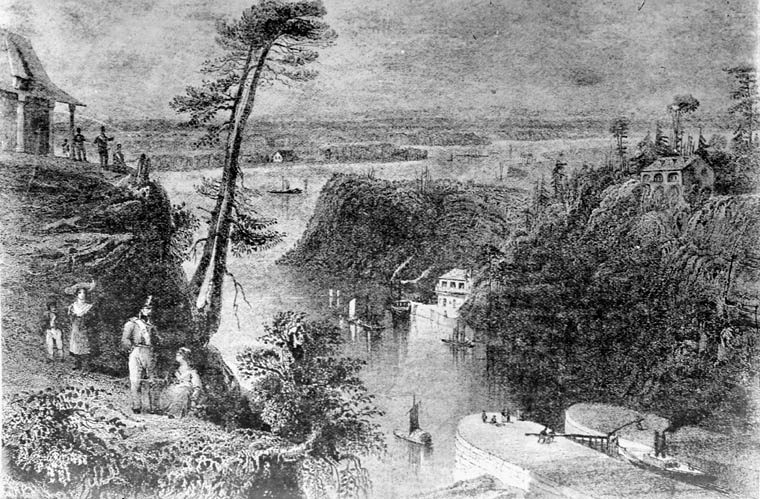
An engraving of the Rideau Canal locks at Bytown

The Romans were the first to build arch dams, where the reaction forces from the abutment stabilizes the structure from the external hydrostatic pressure, but it was only in the 19th century that the engineering skills and construction materials available were capable of building the first large-scale arch dams.

Three pioneering arch dams were built around the British Empire in the early 19th century. Henry Russel of the Royal Engineers oversaw the construction of the Mir Alam dam in 1804 to supply water to the city of Hyderabad (it is still in use today). It had a height of 12 m (39 ft) and consisted of 21 arches of variable span.

In the 1820s and 1830s, Lieutenant-Colonel John By supervised the construction of the Rideau Canal in Canada near modern-day Ottawa and built a series of curved masonry dams as part of the waterway system. In particular, the Jones Falls Dam, built by John Redpath, was completed in 1832 as the largest dam in North America and an engineering marvel. In order to keep the water in control during construction, two sluices, artificial channels for conducting water, were kept open in the dam. The first was near the base of the dam on its east side. A second sluice was put in on the west side of the dam, about 20 ft (6.1 m) above the base. To make the switch from the lower to upper sluice, the outlet of Sand Lake was blocked off.

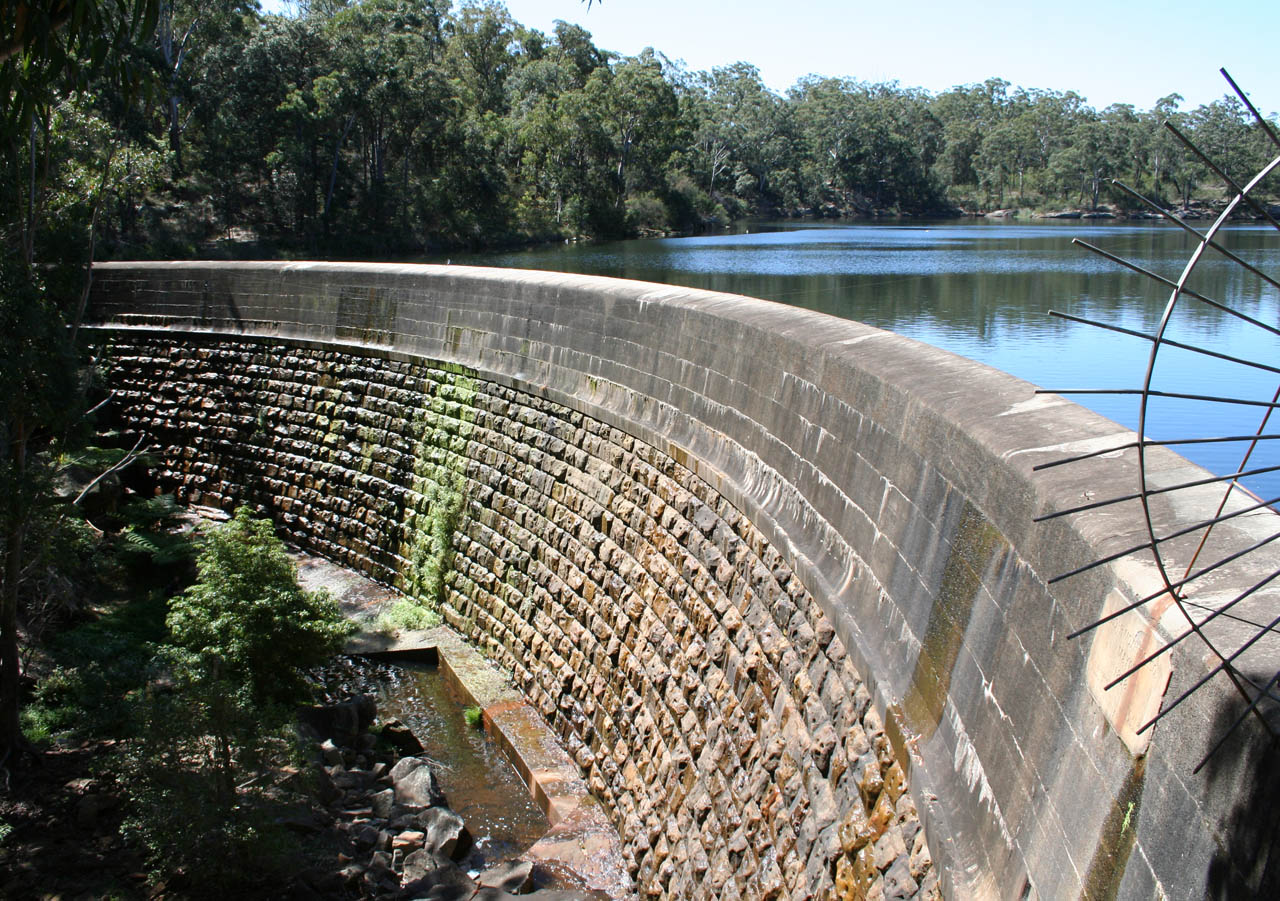
Masonry arch wall, Parramatta, New South Wales, the first engineered dam built in Australia

Hunts Creek near the city of Parramatta, Australia, was dammed in the 1850s, to cater to the demand for water from the growing population of the city. The masonry arch dam wall was designed by Lieutenant Percy Simpson who was influenced by the advances in dam engineering techniques made by the Royal Engineers in India. The dam cost £17,000 and was completed in 1856 as the first engineered dam built in Australia, and the second arch dam in the world built to mathematical specifications.

The first such dam was opened two years earlier in France. It was the first French arch dam of the industrial era, and it was built by François Zola in the municipality of Aix-en-Provence to improve the supply of water after the 1832 cholera outbreak devastated the area. After royal approval was granted in 1844, the dam was constructed over the following decade. Its construction was carried out on the basis of the mathematical results of scientific stress analysis.

The 75-miles dam near Warwick, Australia, was possibly the world's first concrete arch dam. Designed by Henry Charles Stanley in 1880 with an overflow spillway and a special water outlet, it was eventually heightened to 10 m (33 ft).

In the latter half of the nineteenth century, significant advances in the scientific theory of masonry dam design were made. This transformed dam design from an art based on empirical methodology to a profession based on a rigorously applied scientific theoretical framework. This new emphasis was centered around the engineering faculties of universities in France and in the United Kingdom. William John Macquorn Rankine at the University of Glasgow pioneered the theoretical understanding of dam structures in his 1857 paper On the Stability of Loose Earth. Rankine theory provided a good understanding of the principles behind dam design. In France, J. Augustin Tortene de Sazilly explained the mechanics of vertically faced masonry gravity dams, and Zola's dam was the first to be built on the basis of these principles.

== Modern era ==
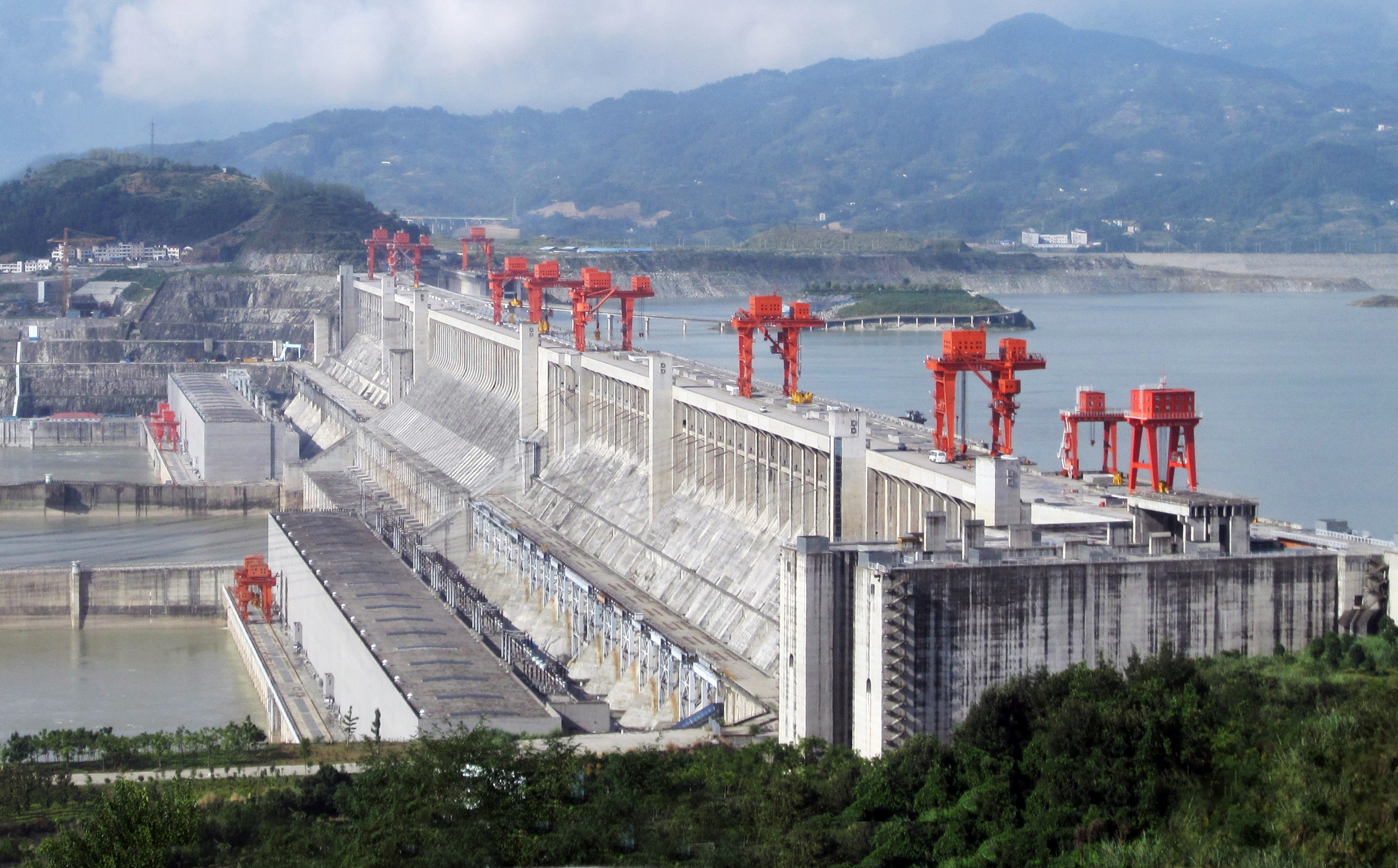
The Three Gorges Dam in China

The era of large dams was initiated with the construction of the Aswan Low Dam in Egypt in 1902, a gravity masonry buttress dam on the Nile River. Following their 1882 invasion and occupation of Egypt, the British began construction in 1898. The project was designed by Sir William Willcocks and involved several eminent engineers of the time, including Sir Benjamin Baker and Sir John Aird, whose firm, John Aird & Co., was the main contractor. Capital and financing were furnished by Ernest Cassel. When initially constructed between 1899 and 1902, nothing of its scale had ever before been attempted; on completion, it was the largest masonry dam in the world.

The Hoover Dam is a massive concrete arch-gravity dam, constructed in the Black Canyon of the Colorado River, on the border between the US states of Arizona and Nevada between 1931 and 1936 during the Great Depression. In 1928, Congress authorized the project to build a dam that would control floods, provide irrigation water and produce hydroelectric power. The winning bid to build the dam was submitted by a consortium called Six Companies, Inc. Such a large concrete structure had never been built before, and some of the techniques were unproven. The torrid summer weather and the lack of facilities near the site also presented difficulties. Nevertheless, Six Companies turned over the dam to the federal government on 1 March 1936, more than two years ahead of schedule.

By 1997, there were an estimated 800,000 dams worldwide, some 40,000 of them over 15 m (49 ft) high. In 2014, scholars from the University of Oxford published a study of the cost of large dams – based on the largest existing dataset – documenting significant cost overruns for a majority of dams and questioning whether benefits typically offset costs for such dams.

== Number of dams in the world ==
The number of large (Note: The International Commission on Large Dams defines a large dam as "a dam with a height of 15 metres or greater from lowest foundation to crest or a dam between 5 metres and 15 metres impounding more than 3 million cubic metres".) dams in the world in 2025 was 62,362, according to the International Commission on Large Dams (ICOLD). The total number of reservoirs (large and small) in 2011 was estimated to be 16.7 million. (Note: The count of reservoirs includes those created by all types of barriers, not all of which are dams.) (Note: Data as of 2011.) These reservoirs store an estimated 8,070 km^{3} of water, which is about 10% of the volume of the earth's natural freshwater lakes. The reservoirs cover about 305,000 km^{2} of the planet's surface, which is about 7.3% of the area covered by natural lakes. About 7.6% of the world's rivers are significantly impacted by reservoirs; and 46.7% of large rivers are affected. In 2015, the number of hydropower dams planned or under construction was 3,700, with most in China (highest total generation capacity), Brazil (highest number of planned dams), and India.
