= List of historic dams =

This is list of ancient and historic dams built by humankind.

== Pre-500 AD ==
Name	Location	Date	Type	Notes
Sadd el-Kafara Dam	Egypt	~2600 BC	Masonry (failed)	Oldest known masonry-faced dam; failed during construction due to flooding.
Marib Dam	Yemen	~750 BC (early form ~2000 BC)	Earthen with masonry core	Key to Sabaean irrigation; expanded multiple times; functioned for over 1,000 years.
Jerwan Dam	Iraq	700 BC	Masonry	Dam and oldest aqueduct part of the Atrush Canal System
Jawa Dam	Jordan	~3000 BC	Stone gravity dam	Oldest known dam in the world; built to hold flash flood waters.
Lake Homs Dam (Qattinah Dam)	Syria	~1300 BC	Earthfill with stone	Early large-scale reservoir; modified over centuries.

== 1-500AD ==
Name	Location	Date	Type	Notes
Kallanai Dam (Grand Anicut)	Tamil Nadu, India	~100 AD	Stone masonry	Built by Chola King Karikalan; still in use today—one of the oldest operational dams.
Band-e Kaisar (Caesar's Dam)	Shushtar, Iran	~260 AD	Roman-style masonry	Built by Roman captives; part of the Shushtar Hydraulic System (UNESCO site).
Cornalvo Dam	Spain	~1st century AD	Masonry gravity dam	Roman origin; maintained into the medieval era; still standing.
Proserpina Dam	Spain	~1st century AD	Earth and masonry	Roman dam still retaining water; UNESCO World Heritage Site.

== 1501AD-2000AD ==
Name	Location	Date	Type	Notes
Elche Dam (Pantano de Elche)	Spain	1632	Masonry arch dam	One of the earliest arch dams still in use.
Tibi Dam	Spain	1594	Masonry gravity dam	World’s tallest dam (42 m) for over 300 years.
Nagarjuna Sagar Dam	India	1967	Masonry gravity dam	With height of 124 metres, currently, it is the world’s tallest stone masonry dam.
