= Subiaco Dams =

- Location within Italy
- Location: Subiaco, Lazio, Italy
- Coordinates: 41°54′38.4″N 13°7′30.6″E
- Opening date: Reign of Nero (54–68 AD)

Dam and spillways
- Impounds: Aniene
- Height: 50 m (160 ft)
- Length: 70 m (230 ft)
- Width (base): 13.5 m

The Subiaco Dams were a group of three Roman gravity dams at Subiaco, Lazio, Italy, devised as pleasure lakes for Emperor Nero (54–68 AD). The biggest one was the highest dam in the Roman Empire, and even in the world until its accidental destruction in 1305.

== Location ==
The dam was built by the Romans at Sublaqueum (modern Subiaco), in the Roman province of Latium in central Italy on the river Aniene (Lat. Anio). Sublaqueum is from the Latin sub lacu, meaning "below the lake".

The location lies some 75 km east of Rome. The simple gravity dam was constructed of masonry and stood roughly 410m above sea level.

== History ==
The ancient name of the city, Sublaqueum, derives from its position below the lakes of Nero's villa. In the reign of Claudius (41 - 54) and Nero (54 - 68), the area around Subiaco formed an imperial summer residence, offering the possibility of hunting trips and parties in an idyllic landscape

Especially under Emperor Nero, luxurious villas emerged (Villa di Caccia, Villa of Horace, Villa of Trajan) stylistically foreshadowing Hadrian's Villa, which were built by the emperors themselves and by other high-ranking Roman families. As well as the high standard of living and general splendour, we also hear about systems of waterworks, extensive parklands, and festival banquets.

In order to secure the water supply of the metropolis of Rome, the aqueduct Anio Novus was erected under Trajan, at which point he built the dammed lakes as water reservoirs. For this, sources were first selected in the valley below the lakes, but these turned out to be susceptible to impurities during heavy rainfall. The construction of the dammed lakes turned out to be very advantageous; there the particles and debris in the water sank to the lakebed and the water became pure.

With their conversion to sources of drinking water for the capital, these structures received regular inspection and repair thereafter. This was neglected only with the decline of Rome in the latter period of the Roman empire. Of the original three dams, two continued to be preserved into the Middle Ages, but the last dam burst after a flood in 1305. The destruction of the already dilapidated dam was handed down in one account:

In the year 1305, two monks are supposed to have taken stones from the wall, because they wanted to lower the water level, presumably in order to make the water further from their fields. The wall no longer withstood the weight of the water; apparently, a breach appeared and grew ever larger, until the wall finally gave way.

== Structural description ==
=== Overall design ===
The dam was the middle and highest in a series of three dams. The structural remains had already been carried off for new construction in the city of Subiaco in the late Middle Ages. The masonry of the dam had a reconstructed height of 40 metres (perhaps up to 50 metres high), was 13.5 metres thick and a length of 80 metres across the top.

On the position of the largest dam there are two hypotheses, which have been discussed in the literature. One of them suggests a fairly favourable location directly below Nero's villa, where the valley narrows to a bottleneck. The other theory proposes a place further down the stream, near San Mauro stream - where a field is found by the riverbank. According to Arnold Esch, the original location of the dam is indisputedly the narrow area at the Ponte di San Mauro, the stream joining the Aniene at the road to Arcinazzo. In that place, traces of incorporation into the rockface can be seen and a bit further downriver cement residue, i.e. Roman concrete from the mortar, has been found. However, instead of this place near this stream, Smith held a place about 200 metres upstream to be more likely. In that place, during the construction of a road in 1883/84 remains were also found and were documented by Gustavo Giovannoni.

=== Pictorial representation ===
In Subiaco Abbey (Sacro Speco), near Subiaco, an image by an unknown painter is found, which was produced in 1428, i.e. 123 years after the dam's destruction. It depicts the dam and shows it as simple masonry in blocks, with two openings under the top of the dam, through which the water flows. Nearby, Nero's Villa is visible.

The dam remained the largest to have been built in Europe until 1594, when the 46-metre-high (151 ft) Tibi Dam was built in Spain and the highest on Earth until the construction of the Kurit Dam around 1350.

== See also ==
- List of Roman dams and reservoirs
- List of dams and reservoirs
- Dam failure
- Roman architecture
- Roman engineering

== Bibliography ==
- Arnold Esch, "Die Wasser des Aniene: Welt aus Natur und Geschichte," FAZ vol 23. October 2013
- A. Trevor Hodge, Roman Aqueducts & Water Supply. London 1992, Duckworth Verlag, ISBN 0-7156-2194-7
- Niklaus Schnitter, "Römische Talsperren," Antike Welt, Bd. 8, Nr. 2 (1978), S. 25–32
- Norman Smith, "The Roman Dams of Subiaco,"Technology and Culture, Bd. 11, Nr. 1 (1970), S. 58-68
- Norman Smith, A History of Dams., London 1971, Peter Davies Verlag, ISBN 0432150900
- Alexius Vogel, "Die historische Entwicklung der Gewichtsstaumauer." in: Historische Talsperren (1987), ISBN 3-87919-145-X
