= Iturranduz Dam =

Dam in Navarra, Spain

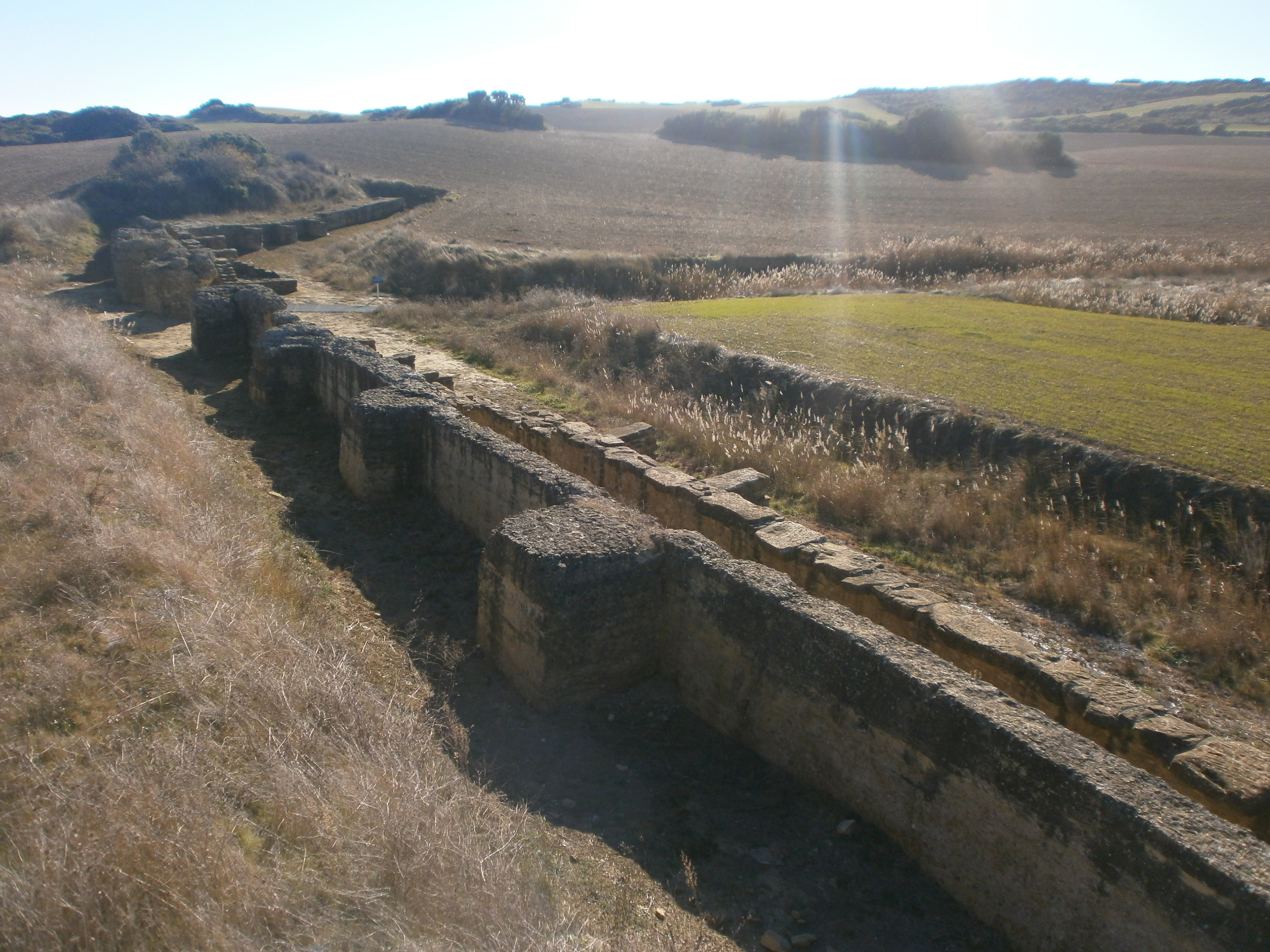
- Location: Navarre, Spain
- Coordinates: 42°36′31″N 1°53′44″W
- Opening date: 2nd / 3rd–4th century

Dam and spillways
- Impounds: San Pedro (Ebro basin)
- Height: >4.0 / ? m
- Length: 102.0 / 150.0 m
- Width (base): 1.0 / 0.7 m

The Iturranduz Dam was a Roman buttress dam in Navarra, Spain. It consisted of two dams, one dating to the 2nd, the other to the 3rd or 4th century AD.

== See also ==
- List of Roman dams and reservoirs
- Roman architecture
- Roman engineering
