= Muel Dam =

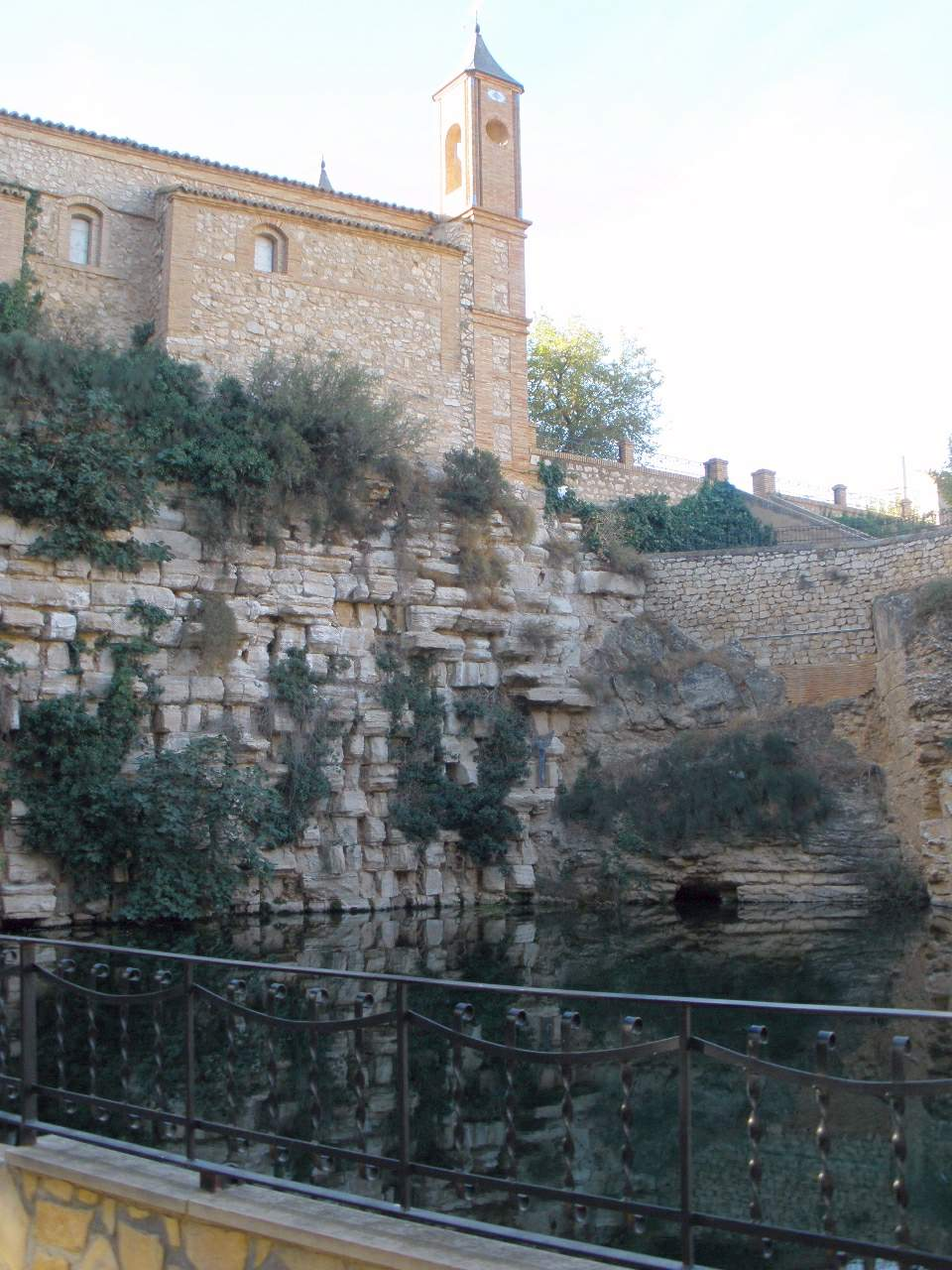
- Interactive map of Muel Dam
- Location: Zaragoza province, Aragon, Spain
- Coordinates: 41°27′56.4″N 1°4′54″W
- Opening date: 1st century

Dam and spillways
- Impounds: Huerva (Ebro basin)
- Height: 13.0 m (42.7 ft)
- Length: 60.0 m (196.9 ft)
- Width (base): ? 7.0 m (23.0 ft) ?

The Muel Dam was a Roman gravity dam in Zaragoza province, Aragon, Spain, dating to the 1st century AD.

The resulting reservoir in Muel, fed by the Huerva River, was created during the time of Augustus in the early 1st century. It served to provide water to the Colonia Caesaraugusta, present-day Zaragoza, which had been founded shortly before.

== Description ==
The structure dates back to the 1st century and was designed as a gravity dam. Materials from a nearby quarry were used for its construction. The quarry marks on the materials show that the extraction activity was organized in the Roman style, with the quarry likely being the property of the Roman colony. The marks could also suggest that the construction was carried out by legionnaires from the Legio IV Macedonica, which was employed in other public works in the region during that period. Veterans from this legion later settled in the colony that supported the infrastructure. Some authors alternatively propose that the inscriptions indicate the work of various teams, without attributing authorship to the said legion. Given the scarcity and ambiguity of the inscriptions, the matter remains a subject of academic debate.

The wall, approximately 10.35 meters in height and at least 60 meters long, was constructed using a core of concrete with layers of carefully placed limestone blocks, arranged in a stretcher and header pattern with irregularly shaped pieces. The layers averaged about 50 centimeters in height. The thickness of the wall at the base is estimated to be 11.5 meters, tapering as it rises. The lower part was also reinforced with Jetty to waterproof and protect the base of the structure, preventing its undermining.

The dam impounded water over an area of approximately 80 hectares (2000x400 m).

From the dam, the water was diverted to Caesar Augusta, with remnants of a canal still preserved on the right bank of the Huerva. The city had a network of conduits, and some authors suggest that the supply from Muel could be one of the inlets, although the details remain a topic of debate. Other scholars, on the other hand, propose that the canal was used for irrigation, with drinking water sourced from different springs.

== Subsequent History ==
The dam was abandoned around the 3rd century due to natural siltation, during a period of urban decline in the middle Ebro valley. The Huerva River wasn't dammed again until 1731, when the Mezalocha dam project commenced.

The lake impounded by the wall has completely silted up to the top of the wall over the centuries, ensuring the preservation of the structure's lower portion. The silted area transformed into the fertile Huerva valley, one of the garden areas adjacent to Zaragoza, while the Huerva captured the nearby Torrubia ravine, forming its modern course. Excavations in this area have uncovered burials from the 14th to the 17th centuries.

In 1770, the church of the Virgen de la Fuente was built over the reservoir, with frescoes painted by Francisco de Goya. During the construction of the church, the upper ashlars of the dam were repurposed, as the dam served as a source of materials.

Currently, the Muel city council has constructed a park in the area, with the old dam forming a small pond.

== Archaeological Study ==
The dam was academically described for the first time in 1957 by Manuel Pellicer. In 1964, Guillermo Fatás published the first archaeological study on it. However, there were no further works on the dam in the subsequent decades.

At the beginning of the 21st century, it became the subject of an archaeological research project from 2009 to 2012. This was concurrent with the discovery and analysis of the nearby Roman quarry during the development of the Urban Planning General Plan of Muel. In 2012, it was designated as a Cultural Heritage Site.

== See also ==
- List of Roman dams and reservoirs
- Roman architecture
- Roman engineering
