= Romans in Persia =

Roman invasion from 64 BCE

The Roman Empire briefly occupied part of the Parthian Empire in modern-day Iran (Persia). Emperor Trajan was even temporarily able to nominate a king of western parts of Parthia, Parthamaspates, to rule a Roman client state.

== Characteristics ==
The Romans, having expanded into the Eastern Mediterranean, came in contact with their historical rivals in West Asia: the Parthians and Persians, whose respective empires occupied modern Iran and surrounding areas. The Iranian empires that faced the Romans had different names, related to the origin of the dynasties in control of their empires in different historical periods: first were the Medians (Media Atropatene), then Parthians and finally Sasanians.

In 64 BC, Pompey conquered the remaining Seleucid territories in Syria, extinguishing their state and advancing the Roman eastern frontier to the Euphrates, where Romans met for the first time the territory of the Parthians.

Mark Antony, in his quest to avenge the battle of Carrhae defeat, conquered in 33 BC some areas of Atropatene (northwestern Iran) and Armenia but soon lost it: that was the first time that Romans occupied a Persian territory, even if temporarily.

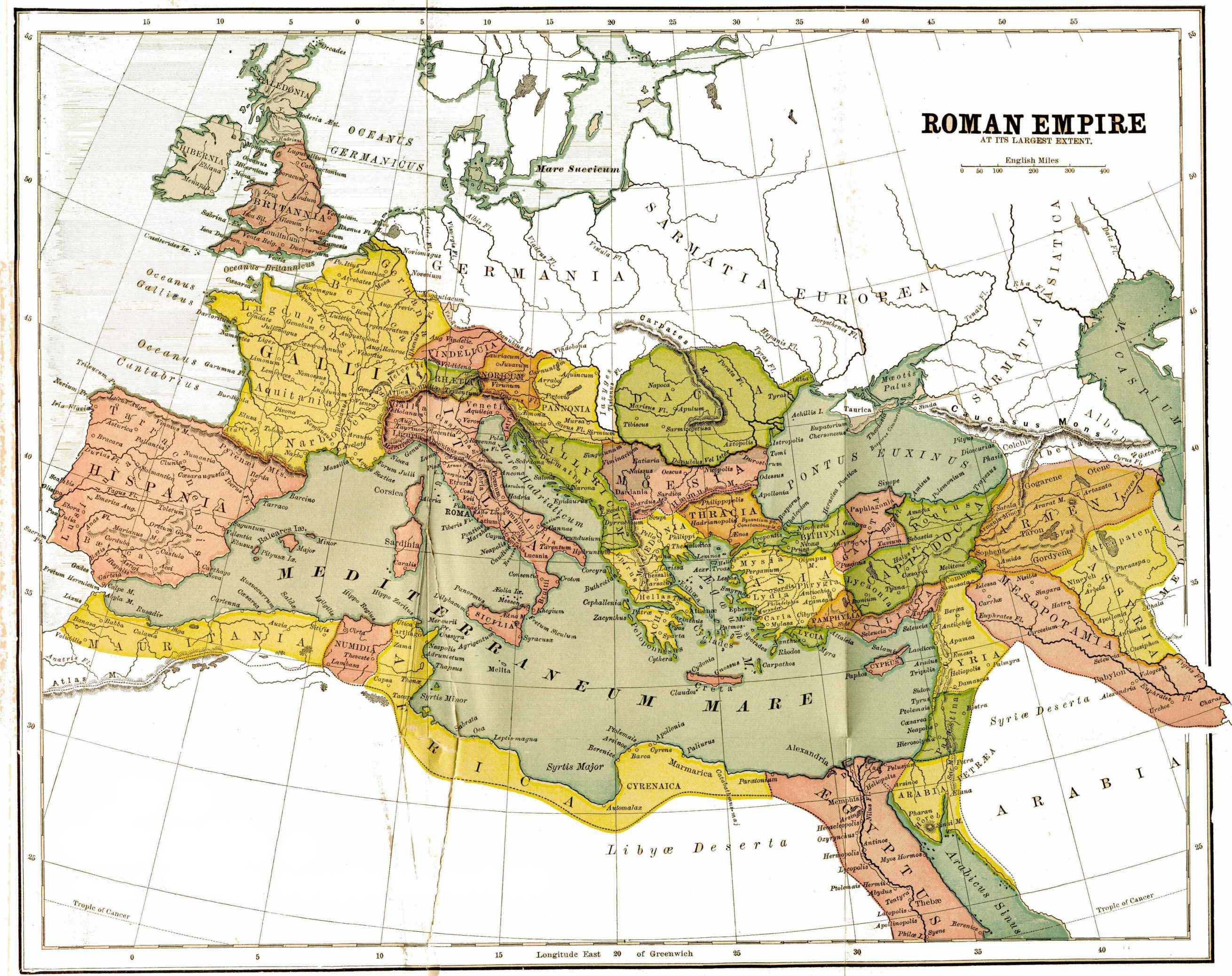
Map showing Media Atropatene inside the Roman Empire, as part of Assyria province

Furthermore, probably in 20 BC, Augustus is said to have nominated Ariobarzanes II, the son of Artavasdes, to be king of Media Atropatene, creating a semi-authonomous "vassal state" of Rome in what is now northwestern Iran. But soon, around 19 AD, The Parthians took again full control of Atropatene.

Although warfare between the Romans and the Parthians/Sasanians lasted for seven centuries, the frontier remained largely stable in those centuries. A game of tug of war ensued: towns, fortifications, and provinces were continuously sacked, captured, destroyed, and traded. The line of stalemate shifted in the 2nd century AD with Trajan: it had run along the northern Euphrates until then. The new line ran northeast, across Mesopotamia to the northern Tigris. There were also several substantial shifts further north, in Armenia and the Caucasus.

A new series of wars began in the 2nd century AD, during which the Romans consistently held the upper hand over Parthia. In 113 AD, the Roman Emperor Trajan decided that the moment was ripe to resolve the "eastern question" once and for all time by the decisive defeat of Parthia and the annexation of Armenia: his conquests mark a deliberate change of the Roman Policy towards Parthia, and a shift of emphasis in the "grand strategy" of the empire. (Note: "Trajan succeeded in acquiring territory in these lands with a view to annexation, something which had not seriously been attempted before [...] Although Hadrian abandoned all of Trajan's conquests [...] the trend was not to be reversed. Further wars of annexation followed under Lucius Verus and Septimius Severus.")

Finally, one characteristic of the Roman presence in Persia is that Roman emperors dreamed of conquering all Persia from Trajan to Galerius, while Parthian/Sasanian kings never tried to conquer Rome, Italy or southeastern Europe according to historian Theodor Mommsen.

== Roman Parthia ==
Romans were able to conquer the westernmost part of Parthia under emperor Trajan.

In 113 AD, Trajan invaded Parthia, marching first on Armenia. In 114 AD, Trajan annexed Armenia to the Roman empire, after defeating and killing Parthamasiris, relative of Osroes I of Parthia. Then he turned south into Parthia itself, taking the cities of Babylon, Seleucia and finally the capital of Ctesiphon in 116 AD.

He deposed Osroes I and put his own puppet ruler Parthamaspates on the throne. In Mesopotamia Osroes' brother Mithridates IV and his son Sanatruces II took the diadem and fought against the Romans, but Trajan marched southward to the Persian Gulf, defeated them, and declared Mesopotamia a new province of the empire. In the process, he also captured the great city of Susa in Khuzestan.

Those months of 116 and 117 saw western Parthia as a client state of the Romans. Trajan originally planned to annex Parthia as part of the Roman Empire, but ultimately decided instead to place Parthamaspates on his father's throne as a Roman client, doing so in 116.

Trajan then proceeded into Mesopotamia with eleven Legions, taking the city of Nisibis and Batnae in September 115 AD. For these early victories, he was granted the title Parthicus by the Senate, which he was hesitant to accept. Continuing his march, Trajan crossed the Tigris River using boats and reached the city of Babylon, before returning to Antioch to pass the winter. In the following year, Trajan returned to Mesopotamia to continue his conquest. He crossed the Tigris, reaffirmed his conquest of Adiabene and proceeded to Ctesiphon, the most important capital of the Parthian Empire. The Parthian King fled and the city fell without much of a siege. At that point, Trajan formally incorporated the title Parthicus into his name to his victory, along with the phrase Parthia Capta (Parthia seized) on his coins. During all of this campaign, he had been largely unopposed on the field by the Parthians, who had been severely weakened in a civil war that was still ongoing during Trajan’s campaign. No major pitched battles were recorded and it appears that most of the campaign had consisted of sieges. Trajan himself was disappointed, for he had not won a great victory on the field against the “King of Kings”, as Alexander the Great had centuries before him. Upon reaching the Persian Gulf, it is said that he lamented as he saw a ship leaving for India, where he could not bring his conquest to. In southern Mesopotamia, Trajan learned that the cities he conquered in the north were revolting. He then dispatched his generals who recaptured the region. Nisibis was recaptured and Edessa was sacked. Then, Trajan received word that a Parthian general Parthamastaphes, nephew of the King, was arriving with an army. Interestingly, no battle was fought. Instead, Trajan placed Parthamastaphes on the throne of Ctesiphon as puppet Trajan’s puppet king. However, Trajan’s campaign turned for the worse. Armenia revolted from Roman rule and Trajan was forced to concede much of his Armenian conquests. In Mesopotamia, the city of Hatra resisted Trajan’s siege. Unable to take the city and short of supplies and campaign resources, Trajan’s campaign came to a close. The emperor withdrew his men from southern Mesopotamia to consolidate his gains in the north. Trajan planned to embark on another campaign, but was struck by illness. Trajan died in 117 AD, after returning home.

Trajan even created the province of Assyria, whose eastern border were never well defined by historians: it is possible that included northwestern Elam, a semi-autonomous Persian province (now Īlām Province of Iran) that welcomed his conquest of Mesopotamia.

Following Trajan's death and Roman withdrawal from the area, Osroes easily defeated Parthamaspates and reclaimed the Persian throne. Hadrian acknowledged this fait accompli, recognized Osroes, Parthamaspates king of Osroene, and returned Osroes' daughter who had been taken prisoner by Trajan (as a warranty to control his client state).

Even if there were further attacks from Roman emperors against the Parthian and later Sasanian empire (Romans even suffered humiliating defeats, like with emperor Valerian), no huge territory of actual Iran was ever occupied by Roman legions again: The Romans stopped always after conquering Ctesiphon and soon returned behind their "limes siriacus" (only in 298 AD western Atropatene up to lake Urmia was occupied by Romans for half a century).

Indeed, this city (capital of the Parthian and Sasanian empires, but not located in Iran) was captured by Rome five times in its history — three times in the 2nd century alone. The emperor Trajan captured Ctesiphon in 116 AD, but his successor, Hadrian, decided to willingly return Ctesiphon the next year as part of a peace settlement. The Roman general Avidius Cassius captured Ctesiphon in 164 AD during another Parthian war, but abandoned it when peace was concluded. In 197 AD, the emperor Septimius Severus sacked Ctesiphon and carried off thousands of its inhabitants, whom he sold into slavery. Late in the 3rd century, after the Parthians had been supplanted by the Sassanids, the city again became a source of conflict with Rome. In 283 AD, emperor Carus sacked the city uncontested during a period of civil upheaval. In 295 AD, emperor Diocletianus sent Galerius but was defeated outside the city. However, he returned a year later with a vengeance and won a victory which ended in the fifth and final capture of the city by the Romans in 299 AD.

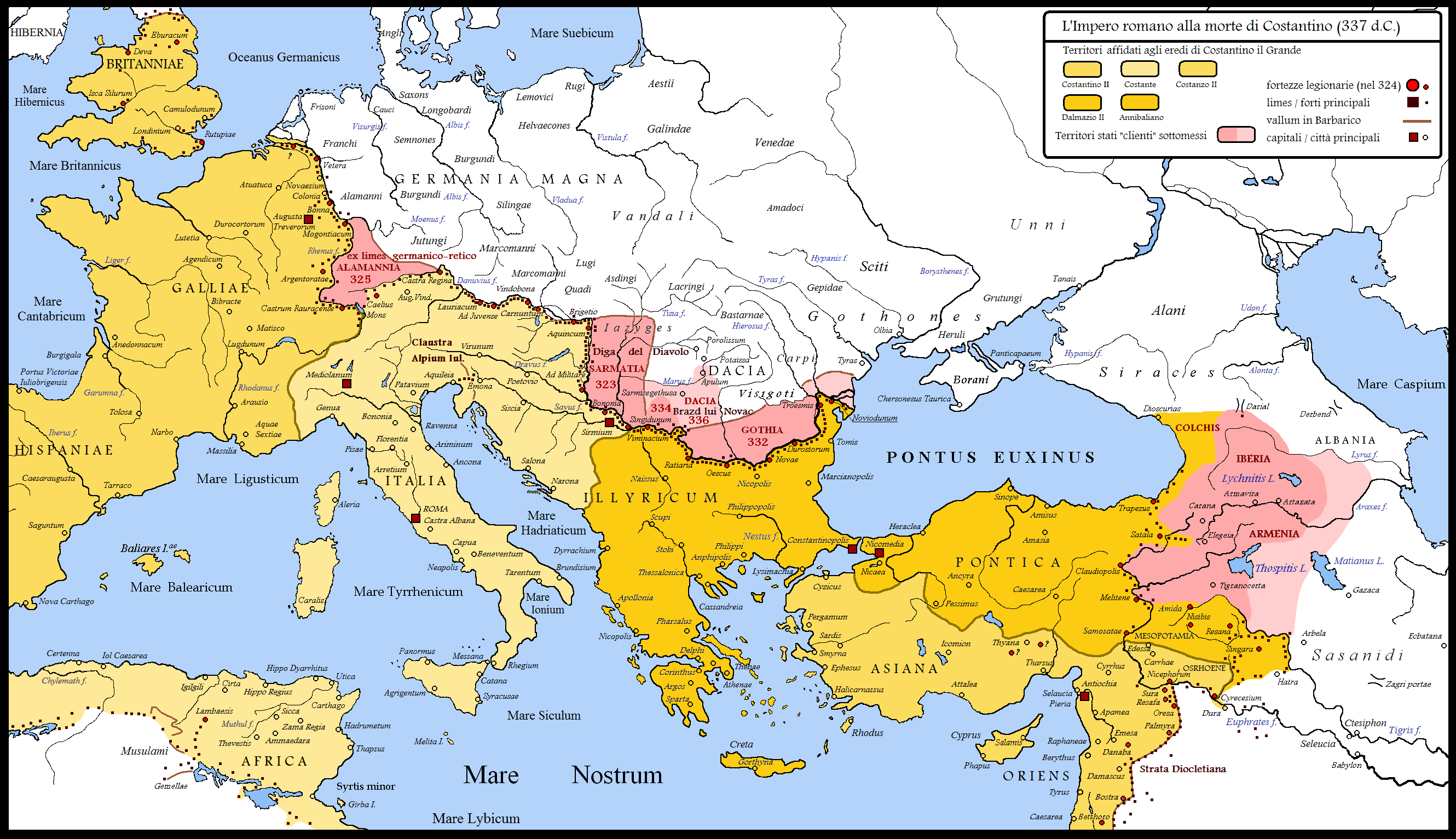
Map showing the Roman conquests in western Persia up to lake Urmia, in the first decades of the 4th century (light pink).

Furthermore, in 297 AD Galerius marched into Eastern Armenia and crushed there a Persian force, capturing an enormous amount of booty and even the harem and family of the Sasanian King Narseh. Moving later into Mesopotamia, Galerius' advance had the Persian defence collapsing before him and so he conquered the Persian capital Ctesiphon. Badly mauled, the Persians sued for peace. In AD 298, the province of Mesopotamia, together with even some territory from across the river Tigris up to the lacus Matianus (now called Lake Urmia in western Iran), was restored to Rome for half a century with the important Treaty of Nisibis in 299 AD.

According to this treaty:

- Five provinces beyond the Tigris were to be ceded to the Romans. One writer gives these provinces as Intilene, Sophene, Arzanene, Carduene, and Zabdicene; while another as Arzanene, Moxoene, Zabdicene, Rehimene, and Corduene.
- The Roman vassal "Kingdom of Armenia" was to be extended up to the fortress of Zintha, in Media Atropatene.

"The extension of Armenia to the fortress of Zintha, in Media, seems to have imported much more than would at first sight appear from the words. Gibbon interprets it as implying the cession of all Media Atropatene, which certainly appears a little later to be in the possession of the Armenian monarch, Tiridates. A large addition to the Armenian territory out of the Median is doubtless intended; but it is quite impossible to determine definitely the extent or exact character of the cession..."

Galerius (who occupied western Persia up to lake Matianus) wanted to conquest all Persia after his victory against Sasanian king Narseh, but Diocletianus preferred to have a Treaty and did the last "Parade" in Rome with a significant victory in the history of the Roman Empire.

Romans withdrew from the homeland territory of Persia with the 363 AD defeat of Jovian, and only Byzantine emperor Heraclius was able to return and conquer Gazaca (the capital of Atropatene) during the Byzantine–Sasanian War of 602–628, just a few years before the Arab conquest of Sassanian Persia.

== Valerian Bridge ==
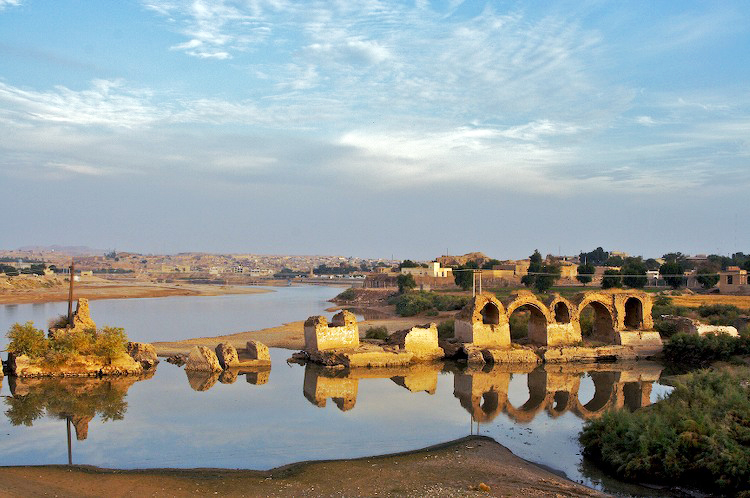
Valerian Bridge or Bridge of Caesar

There are a few Roman ruins in Persia, but one seems to be related to curious war events: the Valerian Bridge.

This Valerian Bridge (Band-e Kaisar in Persian, literally "bridge of Caesar") is named after the Roman emperor Valerian (253–260 AD) who was captured with many legionaries by the Sassanid ruler Shapur I after having been defeated in the Battle of Edessa (260). This vast labour force, which may have numbered up to 50,000 men and included the Roman engineering corps, was deported and was probably employed by the victors for construction work in Shushtar, an important agricultural center in south-western Iran. To service its large stretches of arable land, altogether some 150,000 hectares, the Romans set out to construct three structures: a canal called Ab-i Gargar, and the two dams of Band-e Kaisar and Band-e Mizan which directed the water flow of the Karun river into the artificial watercourse. Perhaps the bridge was built by soldiers of the Sixth legion Ferrata, because this unit disappears from sources after Valerian's defeat.

The story of the Valerian Bridge was written by the Muslim historians Tabari and Masudi in the 9th and 10th centuries. Although their novel-like narrative cannot be ignored, the historical presence of the Romans is corroborated by modern local names, such as "Roumischgan" for a nearby village, and a Lur tribe by the name of "Rumian".

The bridge was designated by UNESCO as Iran's 10th World Heritage Site in 2009.

== See also ==
- Roman Armenia
- Mesopotamia (Roman province)
- Assyria (Roman province)
- Roman influence in Caucasian Albania
- Georgia in the Roman era
- Heraclius
- Atropatene
- Roman–Iranian relations
- Parthia
- Sasanian Empire
- Roman Empire
- Arrajan
- Weh Antiok Khosrow
- Gundeshapur

== Bibliography ==
- Dignas, Beate; Winter, Engelbert (2007). Rome and Persia in Late Antiquity: Neighbours and Rivals. Cambridge University Press. ISBN 9780521849258.
- Lightfoot, C.S. (1990). "Trajan's Parthian war and the Fourth-Century Perspective". The Journal of Roman Studies. 80: 115–125. doi:10.2307/300283. JSTOR 300283.
- Redgate, Anne E. (2000). The Armenians. Blackwell. ISBN 9780631220374.
- Sicker, Martin (2000). "Ch. 12 - The Struggle over the Euphrates Frontier". The Pre-Islamic Middle East (PDF). Praeger. ISBN 9780275968908.
