= Assyria (Roman province) =

Roman province (116–118 AD)

Province of Assyria Provincia Assyria (Latin)
- Province of the Roman Empire
- 116–118
- The province of Assyria in 117 AD, highlighted in red
- Historical era: Antiquity
  - Established by Trajan: 116
  - Evacuated by Hadrian: 118
Preceded by	Succeeded by
Parthian Empire	Parthian Empire
- Today part of: Turkey; Iraq

Assyria (/əˈsɪəriə/) was a short-lived Roman province in Mesopotamia that was created by Trajan in 116 during his campaign against the Parthian Empire. After Trajan's death, the newly proclaimed emperor Hadrian ordered the evacuation of Assyria in 118.

== History ==
According to Eutropius and Festus, two historians who wrote under the direction of the Emperor Valens in the second half of the 4th century, at a time when the Roman emperor Trajan was perceived as "a valuable paradigm for contemporary events and figures", Assyria was one of three provinces (with Armenia and Mesopotamia) created by Trajan in AD 116 following a successful military campaign against Parthia that in that year saw him cross the River Tigris into Mesopotamia and take possession, in spite of resistance, of the Assyrian state of Adiabene and then march south to the Parthian capital of Seleucia-Ctesiphon and to Babylon.

There is numismatic evidence for the Trajanic provinces of Armenia and Mesopotamia, but none for that of Assyria, whose existence is questioned by C.S. Lightfoot and F. Miller.

Despite Rome's military victory, Trajan's 116 conquest was plagued with difficulties. From the start, a Parthian prince named Santruces organized an armed revolt by the native Assyrian people, during which Roman garrisons were driven from their posts and a Roman general was killed as his troops tried to stop the rebellion. Trajan overcame the revolt, capturing and burning Seleucia and Edessa (the Assyrian Urhai), and even setting up a puppet Parthian king; but then, on his journey homeward in triumph, he fell sick and died on 8 August 117.

Trajan's successor, Hadrian, implemented a new policy with respect to the recently acquired territories in the east. Believing that they overextended the Empire, he withdrew to the more easily defensible borders. He left unfinished the work of overcoming the Parthians and their client states, which he saw would require an excessive increase in military spending. He sent the puppet Parthian king elsewhere and restored to the former ruler the lands east of the Euphrates, together with his daughter who had been captured, preferring to live with him in peace and friendship.

== Location ==
The fourth-century historians Eutropius and Festus assume that the supposed Roman province of Assyria was situated "east of the Tigris and usually identified with the Assyrian client kingdom of Adiabene". But some modern scholars argue that the Assyria Provincia was located between the Tigris and Euphrates Rivers, in present-day north central Iraq, a location that is corroborated by the text of the 4th-century Roman historian Festus. Archaeologist André Maricq "convincingly equates it with the Āsurestān (the Iranic term for Assyria) of the 3rd century Šāpur inscription". However, other sources contend that the province was located just south of Armenia and east of the Tigris, in an Assyrian populated region formerly known as Adiabene, which (along with Osroene, Assur, Beth Nuhadra and Beth Garmai) was a Neo-Assyrian kingdom during the Parthian era.

== Further Roman activity in Mesopotamia ==
Hadrian's withdrawal in 118 did not mark the end of Roman rule in Mesopotamia. A second Parthian campaign was launched from 161-165 under the command of Lucius Verus, with the Roman army once more conquering territory east of the Euphrates. Rome pursued military action against the Parthians again in 197-8 under the command of emperor Septimius Severus.

Following his successful campaign, Septimius Severus instituted two new Roman provinces: Mesopotamia and Osroene, a Neo-Assyrian kingdom founded in the 2nd century BC, centered on Edessa. He also stationed two Roman legions in the new provinces to ensure stability and prevent against first Parthian, and later Sassanian attacks. Roman influence in the area came to an end under Jovian in 363, who abandoned the region after concluding a hasty peace agreement with the Sassanians and retreating to Constantinople to consolidate his political power.

Despite continued Roman activity in the region, no further reference is made to a Roman province of Assyria following Hadrian's evacuation in 118 AD. When Septimus Severus created the provinces of Osroene and Mesopotamia at the end of the 2nd century, no mention is made of a Roman province of Assyria. The regions remaining under Parthian and later Sassanid control were named Asuristan until the Islamic conquest of the 7th century AD.

The Roman historian Ammianus Marcellinus (c. 330 − c. 391) says that the state of Adiabene was formerly called Assyria, with no indication that either ever was a Roman province. He says that Assyria was the nearest to Rome of the chief Persian provinces and that in his time it was known by a single name of Assyria, though previously divided among several states. He lists among the cities of Assyria Babylon, Seleucia and Ctesiphon. He speaks of the Emperor Julian as, in his campaign against the Sasanian Empire, attacking Assyrians shortly before crossing the Euphrates into Osroene, as living near the Euphrates to the south of Carrhae,

Thus, it seems that the province of Assyria only existed during Trajan's reign, if even then, and was not reinstated during later Roman occupations of the region. The general area of the northern half of what is today Iraq and part of southeastern Turkey and northeastern Syria coincided with ancient Assyria; however, and between the 6th century BC and 7th century AD the Neo-Babylonian Empire, Achaemenid Empire, Seleucid Empire, Parthian Empire, Armenia and Sassanid Empire all retained similar names for the area (Assyria, Ashur, Athura, Asoristan), with the Sassanids naming the entirety of Mesopotamia as Assuristan.

== See also ==
- Asuristan
- Osroene
- Achaemenid Assyria
- Syria (Roman province)
- Mesopotamia (Roman province)
- History of the Assyrian people
- Romans in Persia
- Roman Armenia
