= List of Roman dams and reservoirs =

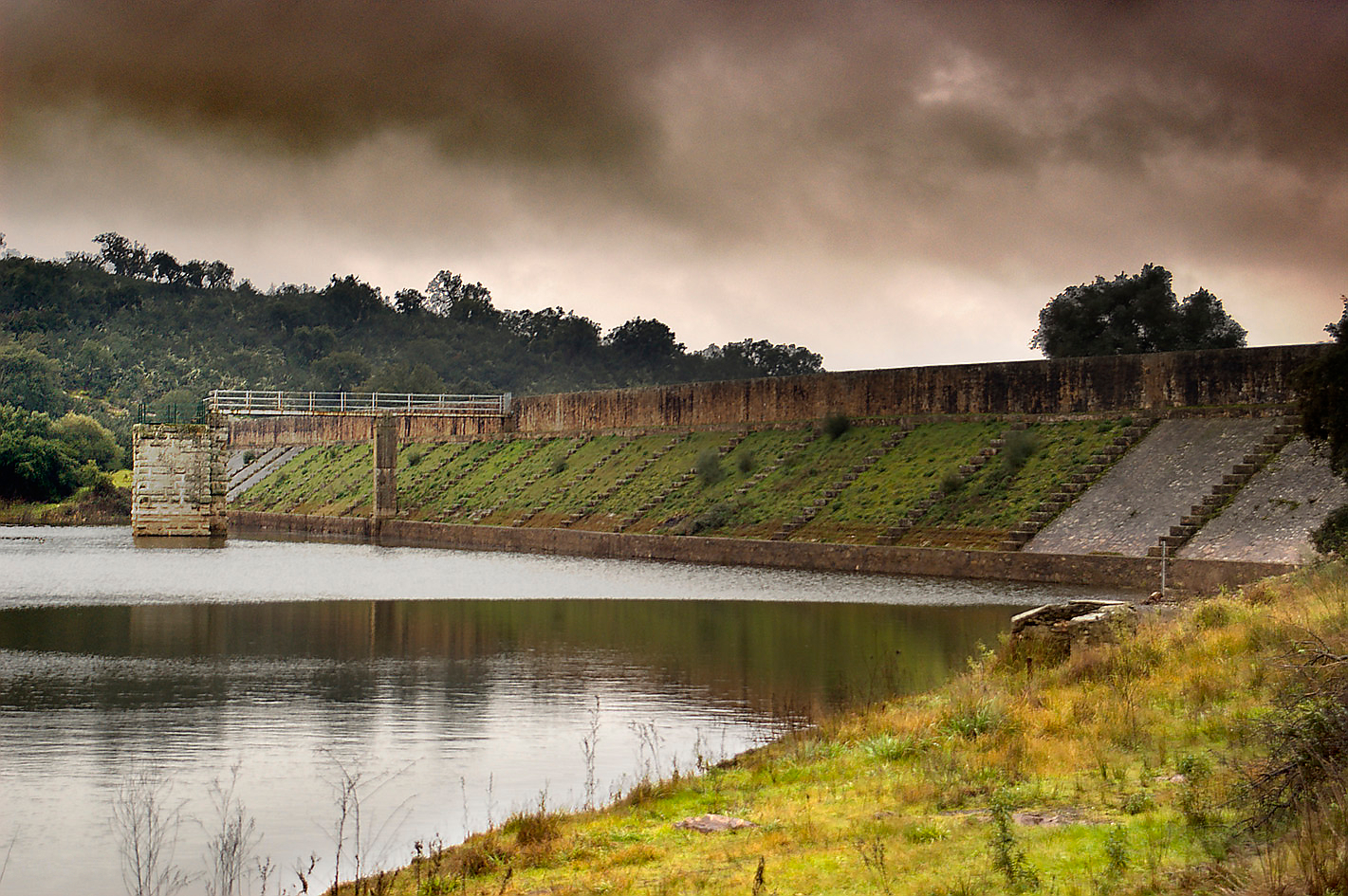
Cornalvo Dam in Spain, erected in the 1st–2nd century AD

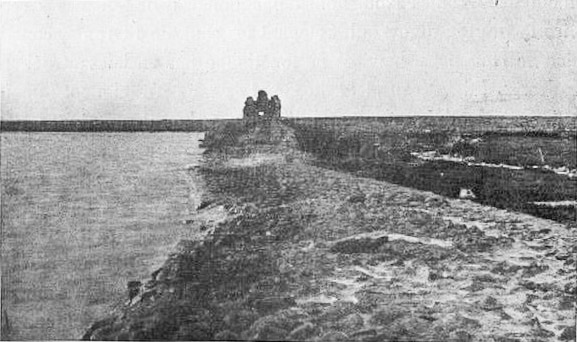
Lake Homs Dam in Syria, erected in 284 AD (photographed 1921)

This is a list of Roman dams and reservoirs. The study of Roman dam-building has received little scholarly attention in comparison to their other civil engineering activities, even though their contributions in this field have been ranked alongside their expertise in constructing the well-known Roman aqueducts, bridges, and roads.

Roman dam construction began in earnest in the early imperial period. For the most part, it concentrated on the semi-arid fringe of the empire, namely the provinces of North Africa, the Near East, and Hispania. The relative abundance of Spanish dams below is due partly to more intensive field work there; for Italy only the Subiaco Dams, created by emperor Nero (54–68 AD) for recreational purposes, are attested. These dams are noteworthy, though, for their extraordinary height, which remained unsurpassed anywhere in the world until the Late Middle Ages.

The most frequent dam types were earth- or rock-filled embankment dams and masonry gravity dams. These served a wide array of purposes, such as irrigation, flood control, river diversion, soil-retention, or a combination of these functions. In this, Roman engineering did not differ fundamentally from the practices of older hydraulic societies.

"The Romans' ability to plan and organise engineering construction on a grand scale" gave their dam construction special distinction. Their engineering prowess, therefore, facilitated the construction of large and novel reservoir dams, which secured a permanent water supply for urban settlements even during the dry season, a common concept today, but little-understood and -employed in ancient times.

The impermeability of Roman dams was increased by the introduction of waterproof hydraulic mortar and especially Roman concrete in the Roman architectural revolution. These materials also allowed for bigger structures to be built, like the Lake Homs Dam, possibly the largest water barrier to date, and the sturdy Harbaqa Dam, both of which consist of a concrete core.

On the whole, Roman dam engineering displayed a high degree of completeness and innovativeness. While hitherto dams relied solely on their heavy weight to resist the thrust of water, Roman builders were the first to realize the stabilizing effect of arches and buttresses, which they integrated into their dam designs. Previously unknown dam types introduced by the Romans include:

- arch-gravity dams
- arch dams
- buttress dams
- multiple-arch buttress dams

The origin of the so-called weir bridges, which were to become a popular design in Iran thereafter, can also be traced to the forced labour of Roman prisoners of war (see Band-e Kaisar).

== List ==
This list is sorted by maximum height. All measurements are in m; in case of differing values, more recent respectively more detailed studies were given preference. In earth dams, thickness refers to the masonry wall.

Height	Thickness	Crest length	Name	Country	Date	Type / Comments
50	13.5	70?	Subiaco Dams	Italy	54–68 AD	Gravity dam. Devised as pleasure lake for Nero, the dam was the highest in the Roman Empire, and in the world until its destruction in 1305.
34.0	38.0	120.0	Almonacid de la Cuba Dam	Spain	1st c.	Gravity dam
28.0	26.0	194.0	Cornalvo Dam	Spain	1st–2nd c.	Gravity dam, still in use
21.6	5.9	427.8	Proserpina Dam	Spain	1st–2nd c.	Gravity dam, still in use
21	?	365	Harbaqa Dam	Syria	2nd c.	Gravity dam
20.0	4.0?	>800.0	Alcantarilla Dam	Spain	2nd c. BC	Gravity dam
16.6	6.9	80.0	Ermita de la Virgen del Pilar Dam	Spain	1st–2nd c.	Gravity dam
16	?	40	Orükaya	Turkey	2nd c.	Arch-gravity dam
13.0	7.0?	60.0	Muel Dam	Spain	1st c.	Gravity dam
12	3.9	18	Glanum Dam	France	1st c. BC	Arch dam, earliest known
12	?	130	Löstügun	Turkey	6th c.	Gravity dam
10	7.3	150	Kasserine Dam	Tunisia	2nd c.	Arch-gravity dam
8.4	2.7	68.0	La Pared de los Moros	Spain	3rd c.	Gravity dam
7.0	2.0	50.0	Arroyo Salado	Spain	?	Gravity dam
7	20	2000	Lake of Homs dam	Syria	3rd c.	Gravity dam, largest artificial reservoir to date (capacity of 90 million m³), still in use
7	?	193	Ma'agan Michael (West)	Israel	4th c.	Gravity dam
7	?	80	Çavdarhisar	Turkey	2nd c.	Arch-gravity dam
7	?	50	Roman dam of Belas	Portugal	2nd c.	Gravity dam
~6.1	?	?	Qasr Khubbaz	Syria	?	?
6.0?	3.0	50.0	Arévalo	Spain	2nd c.	Gravity dam
5.6	2.2	320.0	Esparragalejo Dam	Spain	1st c.	Multiple-arch buttress dam, earliest known
5.2	1.9	95.0	Las Tomas	Spain	4th c.	Buttress dam
5	?	91	Wadi Megenin	Libya	2nd c.	Buttress dam
4.8	2.6	>632.0	Consuegra Dam	Spain	3rd–4th c.	Buttress dam
4.6	4.2	174	Muro Dam	Portugal	?	?
4.5	2.7	141.1	El Paredón	Spain	3rd c.	Gravity dam
4.5	2.5	19.5	Melque VI	Spain	?	Gravity dam
>4.0	1.0	102.0	Lower Iturranduz Dam	Spain	2nd c.	Buttress dam
4.0	5.6	100.0	La Pesquera	Spain	?	Gravity dam
4	?	300	Böget	Turkey	2nd c.	Gravity dam
3.7	1.8	139.0	Araya	Spain	2nd c.	Buttress dam
3.6	3.5	97.8	Vega de Sta. María	Spain	?	Buttress dam
3.5	2.0	40.0	Arroyo Bejarano	Spain	1st c.	Gravity dam
>3.0	3.0	170.0	Charca de Valverde	Spain	?	Gravity dam
3.0	3.4	200.0	Las Muelas	Spain	2nd c.	Buttress dam
3.0	3.0?	29.0	Azud de la Rechuela	Spain	?	Buttress dam
3.0	2.3	30.0	Les Parets Antiques	Spain	3rd–4th c.	Gravity dam
3.0	2.2	150.0	Villafranca	Spain	2nd–3rd c.	Buttress dam
3.0	2.9	40.0	Roman Dam of Pego da Moura	Portugal	?	Buttress dam
3.0	1.8	98.0	Valhermoso Dam	Spain	2nd–3rd c.	Gravity dam
3.0	1.5	30.0	Castillo de Bayuela	Spain	2nd–3rd c.	Buttress dam
3.0?	?	?	San Martín de la Montiña	Spain	1st–2nd c.	Gravity dam
2.5	5.0	100.0	Cañada del Huevo	Spain	2nd c.	Buttress dam
2.5	1.5	25.0	Pineda o Ca'La Verda	Spain	3rd c.	Gravity dam
2.4	1.2	80.0	Paerón I	Spain	1st–2nd c.	Gravity dam
2.2	1.0	15.0	Palomera Baja	Spain	3rd c.	Gravity dam
2.2?	1.0?	30.0?	El Peral	Spain	1st–2nd c.	Gravity dam
2.1	1.9	40.8	Moracantá Dam	Spain	1st–2nd c.	Gravity dam
>2.0	2.5	80.0	Los Paredones	Spain	1st–2nd c.	Gravity dam
>2.0	0.8	52.0–180?	La Cuba	Spain	2nd–3rd c.	Gravity dam
2	10–12	516	Band-e Kaisar	Iran	3rd c.	Gravity dam, earliest dam-bridge (weir combined with arch bridge)
2.0	1.0	56.0	Puy Foradado Dam	Spain	2nd–3rd c.	Arch-gravity dam
1.6	?	?	Las Mezquitas	Spain	2nd c.	Gravity dam
>1.5	1.1	30.0	Paerón II	Spain	1st–2nd c.	Buttress dam
1.5	0.8	35.0	El Pont d'Armentera	Spain	2nd–4th c.	Gravity dam
1.3	1.6	230.0	El Hinojal (Las Tiendas)	Spain	3rd–4th c.	Buttress dam
1.3	1.4	14.7	El Argamasón	Spain	2nd–3rd c.	Gravity dam
1.2	2.4	30.0	Balsa de Cañaveral	Spain	4th c.	Gravity dam
1.1	0.7	13.4	Río Frío	Spain	1st c.	Gravity dam
>0.9	0.7	7.6	El Peral II	Spain	?	Buttress dam
0.9	0.7	40.0	Azud de los Moros	Spain	1st c.	Gravity dam
>0.8	1.6	60.0–80.0	Valencia del Ventoso	Spain	3rd–4th c.	Gravity dam
>0.8	1.1	50.0	El Chaparral	Spain	3rd–4th c.	Gravity dam
?	0.7	150.0	Higher Iturranduz Dam	Spain	3rd–4th c.	Buttress dam
?	?	?	Leptis Magna (Wadi Caam I)	Libya	2nd–3rd c.?	?
?	?	900	Leptis Magna (Wadi Caam II)	Libya	2nd–3rd c.?	?
?	?	?	Leptis Magna (Wadi Lebda)	Libya	2nd–3rd c.?	Buttressed dam
?	?	?	Las Adelfas	Spain	2nd c.	Gravity dam
?	?	?	Monroy	Spain	?	Gravity dam
?	?	?	Odrón y Linares	Spain	?	Gravity dam
?	?	?	Soufeiye	Syria	?	Gravity dam
?	?	?	Dara Dam	Turkey	560 AD	Arch dam, earliest description of arch action in such types of dam by Procopius (De Aedificiis II.3)

== See also ==
- Record-holding dams in antiquity
- Roman architecture
- Roman engineering

== Sources ==
- Arenillas, Miguel; Castillo, Juan C. (2003), "Dams from the Roman Era in Spain. Analysis of Design Forms (with Appendix)", 1st International Congress on Construction History [20th–24th January], Madrid
- Decker, Alexander (1991), "Einige römische Talsperren im heutigen Portugal", in Garbrecht, Günther (ed.), Historische Talsperren, vol. 2, Stuttgart: Verlag Konrad Wittwer, pp. 73–81, ISBN 3-87919-158-1
- Hodge, A. Trevor (1992), Roman Aqueducts & Water Supply, London: Duckworth, ISBN 0-7156-2194-7
- Hodge, A. Trevor (2000), "Reservoirs and Dams", in Wikander, Örjan (ed.), Handbook of Ancient Water Technology, Technology and Change in History, vol. 2, Leiden: Brill, pp. 331–339, ISBN 90-04-11123-9
- James, Patrick; Chanson, Hubert (2002), "Historical Development of Arch Dams. From Roman Arch Dams to Modern Concrete Designs", Australian Civil Engineering Transactions, CE43: 39–56
- Schnitter, Niklaus (1978), "Römische Talsperren", Antike Welt, 8 (2): 25–32
- Schnitter, Niklaus (1987a), "Verzeichnis geschichtlicher Talsperren bis Ende des 17. Jahrhunderts", in Garbrecht, Günther (ed.), Historische Talsperren, vol. 1, Stuttgart: Verlag Konrad Wittwer, pp. 9–20, ISBN 3-87919-145-X
- Schnitter, Niklaus (1987b), "Die Entwicklungsgeschichte der Pfeilerstaumauer", in Garbrecht, Günther (ed.), Historische Talsperren, vol. 1, Stuttgart: Verlag Konrad Wittwer, pp. 57–74, ISBN 3-87919-145-X
- Schnitter, Niklaus (1987c), "Die Entwicklungsgeschichte der Bogenstaumauer", in Garbrecht, Günther (ed.), Historische Talsperren, vol. 1, Stuttgart: Verlag Konrad Wittwer, pp. 75–96, ISBN 3-87919-145-X
- Smith, Norman (1970), "The Roman Dams of Subiaco", Technology and Culture, 11 (1): 58–68, doi:10.2307/3102810, JSTOR 3102810, S2CID 111915102
- Smith, Norman (1971), A History of Dams, London: Peter Davies, pp. 25–49, ISBN 0-432-15090-0
- Vogel, Alexius (1987), "Die historische Entwicklung der Gewichtsmauer", in Garbrecht, Günther (ed.), Historische Talsperren, vol. 1, Stuttgart: Verlag Konrad Wittwer, pp. 47–56, ISBN 3-87919-145-X
