= Ermita de la Virgen del Pilar Dam =

- Location: Teruel province, Aragon, Spain
- Coordinates: 41°4′38.5″N 1°0′32.5″W
- Opening date: 1st–2nd century

Dam and spillways
- Impounds: Sta. María (Ebro basin)
- Height: 16.6 m
- Length: 80.0 m
- Width (base): 6.9 m

The Ermita de la Virgen del Pilar Dam is a Roman gravity dam in Teruel province, Aragon, Spain, dating to the 1st or 2nd century AD.

== See also ==
- List of Roman dams and reservoirs
- Roman architecture
- Roman engineering
