= La Pared de los Moros =

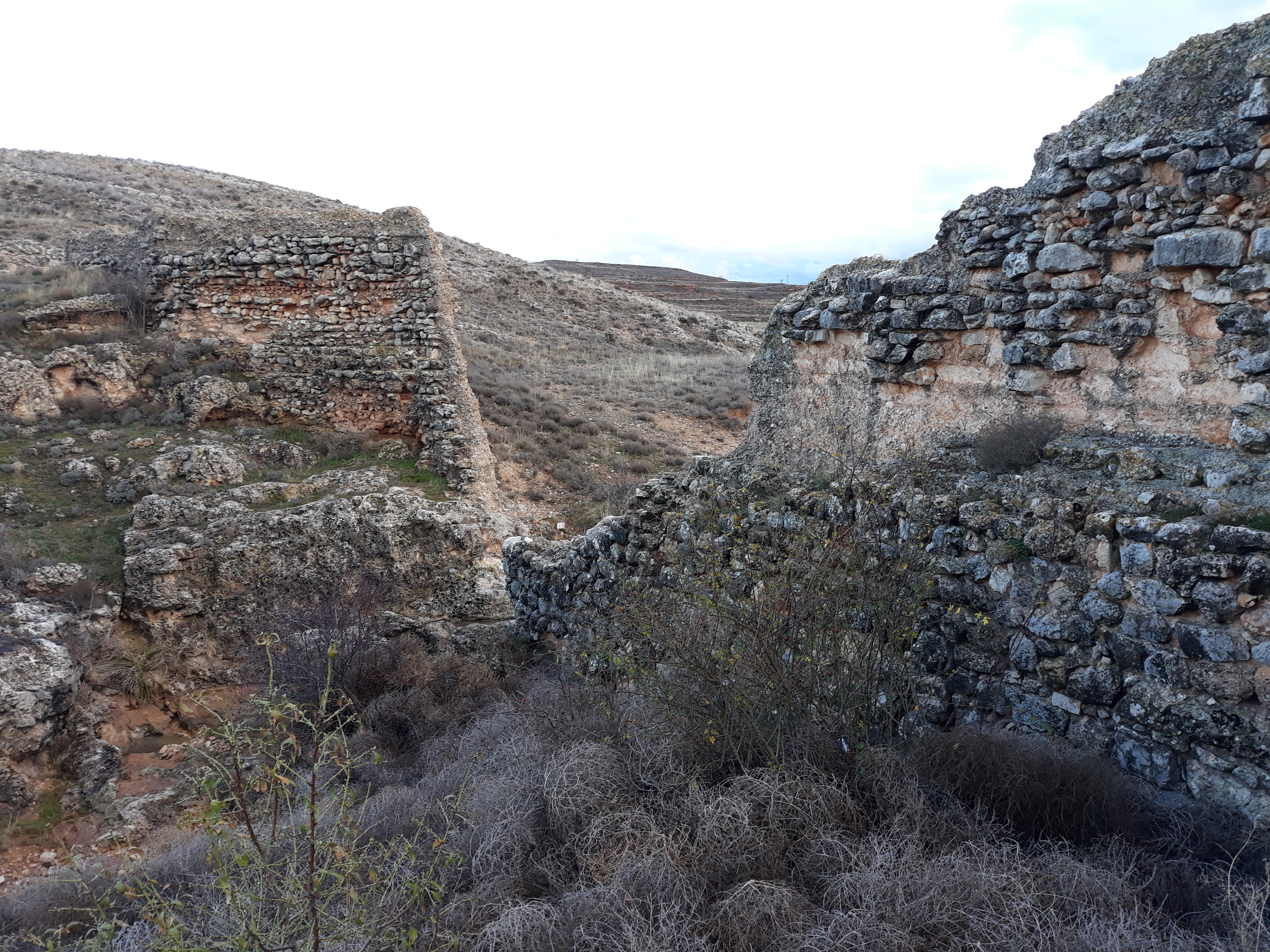
- Location: Teruel province, Aragon, Spain
- Coordinates: 41°1′8″N 0°49′18″W
- Opening date: 3rd century

Dam and spillways
- Impounds: Farlán (Ebro basin)
- Height: 8.4 m
- Length: 68.0 m
- Width (base): 2.7 m

La Pared de los Moros (English: The Moors’ Wall) was a Roman gravity dam in Teruel province, Aragon, Spain, dating to the 3rd century AD.

== Location ==
The remnants of the dam are located in the bed of the Farlán stream, a right tributary of the Aguasvivas River, which in turn flows into the Ebro River. The structure is situated atop outcroppings of Jurassic limestone. Currently, one can reach the archaeological site via two rural access roads from the village of Muniesa, which is approximately 1400 meters from the village center.

== Architecture ==
Typologically, the Pared de los Moros is classified as a gravity dam with an irregular layout. The design is polygonal, consisting of five sections with varying orientations, adapting to the rocky terrain. The dam has a maximum width of 2.65 meters in its central part, a preserved height of 8.4 meters at its tallest point, and a length of approximately 68 meters at the top of the structure.

== See also ==
- List of Roman dams and reservoirs
- Roman architecture
- Roman engineering
