= Puy Foradado Dam =

- Location: Zaragoza province, Aragon, Spain
- Coordinates: 42°17′08″N 1°12′38″W
- Opening date: 2nd or 3rd century

Dam and spillways
- Impounds: Riguel River (Ebro basin)
- Height: 2.0 m
- Length: 56.0 m
- Width (base): 1.0 m

The Puy Foradado Dam was a Roman arch-gravity dam in Zaragoza province, Aragon, Spain, dating to the 2nd or 3rd century AD.

== See also ==
- List of Roman dams and reservoirs
- Roman architecture
- Roman engineering
