= Harbaqa Dam =

Harbaqa Dam سد خربقة
- Location in Syria
- Country: Syria
- Location: Syrian Desert
- Coordinates: 34°14′48″N 37°37′38″E
- Purpose: Water storage, flood control

Dam and spillways
- Type of dam: Gravity dam
- Impounds: Wadi Barada
- Height: 20 m (66 ft)
- Length: 245 m (804 ft)
- Width (crest): 6 m (20 ft)
- Width (base): 18 m (59 ft)

Reservoir
- Total capacity: 5,000,000 m^{3} (6,500,000 cu yd)
- Maximum length: 1,500 m (4,900 ft)
- Maximum width: 800 m (2,600 ft)

The Harbaqa Dam or Kharbaqa Dam (Arabic: سد خربقة) was a Roman era Palmyrene gravity dam in the Syrian Desert about 70 kilometres (43 mi) southwest from Palmyra on the road to Damascus. The dam, built of rubble, concrete, and dressed with ashlar stones, dates to the first or second century AD. The dam later was used as a water supply for the Umayyad palace of Qasr al-Hayr al-Gharbi.

== Overview ==
The dam was built in the first/second-century AD by Palmyra. It was restored and used again by the Umayyads in the eighth century for irrigation purposes. It served as a major water supply for the nearby Qasr al-Hayr al-Gharbi, to which it was connected by a canal. The dam collected the seasonal floods of Wadi al-Barada in a storage basin that could be used all year. The remains of the dam are well-preserved for lack of quarrying from nearby settlements.

The dam was built out of a concrete core faced on both air and water face with ashlar stones. The wall is around 18 metres (59 ft) wide at the base, 20 metres (66 ft) high and stretches for 245 metres (804 ft) in length. The dam wall had three outlets. Two outlets were located at the base that allow the torrential water to flow in winter. The third one, terracotta with a smaller diameter, crossed the dam in a steep slope and was located about 11.20 metres (36.7 ft) from the top on the upstream side. The former reservoir, now filled with silt, had a capacity of 5,000,000 m^{3} (6,500,000 cu yd) and measured up to 1,500 metres (4,900 ft) in length and 800 metres (2,600 ft) in width.

The dam was first surveyed in 1934 by Antoine Poidebard. A more detailed survey and excavation was conducted by a French archaeological team led by Daniel Schlumberger in 1938.

== See also ==
- List of Roman dams and reservoirs
- Roman architecture
- Roman engineering
