= Band-e Kaisar =

UNESCO World Heritage Site in Iran

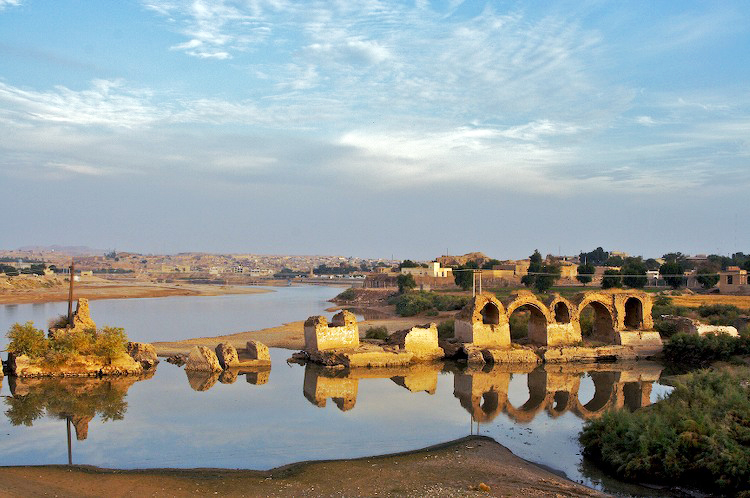
- Remains of the dam bridge
- Coordinates: 32.0538°N 48.8485°E
- Carried: Sassanid road Pasargadae−Ctesiphon
- Crossed: Karun river
- Locale: Shushtar, Iran
- Other name(s): Pol-e Kaisar, Bridge of Valerian, Shadorvan

Characteristics
- Design: Weir with bridge superstructure
- Material: Sandstone ashlar, Roman concrete
- Total length: Ca. 500 m
- Longest span: 9 m
- No. of spans: 40+

History
- Designer: Roman engineers
- Constructed by: Shapur I
- Construction start: Ca. 260–270 AD
- Collapsed: 1885

UNESCO World Heritage Site
- Official name: Shushtar Historical Hydraulic System
- Type: Cultural
- Criteria: i, ii, v
- Designated: 2009 (33rd session)
- Reference no.: 1315
- Region: Asia-Pacific

Iran National Heritage List
- Official name: Valerian/Shadorvan Bridge
- Type: Bridge
- Designated: 1932
- Reference no.: 78
- Conservation organization: Cultural Heritage, Handicrafts and Tourism Organization of Iran

Location
- Interactive map of Band-e Kaisar

The Band-e Kaisar (Persian: بند قیصر, lit. 'Caesar's dam'), Pol-e Kaisar ("Caesar's bridge"), Bridge of Valerian or Shadorvan was an ancient arch bridge in the city of Shushtar, Khuzestan province, Iran, and the first in the country to combine it with a dam. Built by the Sasanians during the 3rd century CE, using Roman prisoners of war as the workforce, it is the easternmost example of Roman bridge design and Roman dam. Its dual-purpose design exerted a profound influence on Iranian civil engineering and was instrumental in developing Sasanian water management techniques.

The approximately 500m long overflow dam over the Karun, Iran's most effluent river, was the core structure of the Shushtar Historical Hydraulic System (سازه‌های آبی شوشتر) from which the city derived its agricultural productivity. The arched superstructure carried across the important road between Pasargadae and the Sasanian capital Ctesiphon. Repaired repeatedly throughout the Islamic era, the dam bridge remained in use until the late 19th century. In 2009, it was designated by UNESCO as Iran's 10th World Heritage Site.

== History ==
According to Persian tradition, the Band-e Kaisar is named after the Roman emperor Valerian (253–260 AD), who was captured with his entire army by the Sasanian ruler Shapur I after having been defeated at the Battle of Edessa (260). This vast labour force, which may have numbered up to 70,000 men and included the Roman engineering corps, was employed by the victors for construction work in Shushtar, an important agricultural center in south-western Iran. To service its large stretches of arable land, altogether some 150,000 hectares, the Romans set out to construct three structures: a canal called Ab-i Gargar, and the two dams of Band-e Kaisar and Band-e Mizan, which directed the water flow of the Karun river into the artificial watercourse. (Note: The names of the two barrages are confused by Smith (1971) and Hodge (1992 & 2000). O'Connor (1993), too, incorrectly locates the Band-e Kaisar on the Ab-i Gargar branch.)

The story is related by the Muslim historians Tabari and Masudi in the 9th and 10th centuries. Although their novelistic narrative cannot be blindly trusted, the historical presence of the Romans is corroborated by modern local names, such as "Roumischgan" for a nearby village, and a Lurs tribe by the name of "Rumian". Moreover, local tradition ascribes to Roman settlers the origin of a number of trades, like the production of brocade, and several popular customs.

The dam bridge at Shushtar belonged to the important road connection between the Sassanid centres of Pasargadae and Ctesiphon. Two further Sassanid dam bridges on this road, the Pa-i-Pol across the Karkheh and the one at Dezful over the Ab-i Diz, are also assumed to be the contemporary work of Roman prisoners of war. Both exhibit typically Roman masonry bound with mortar, a technique completely foreign to indigenous architecture.

Modelled on the Roman example, the integration of a bridge superstructure into dam design became a standard practice of Iranian hydraulic engineering which lasted until about 1000 AD, when it culminated in the still existing Band-e Amir at Shiraz.

== Construction ==
Shushtar lies on a rocky plateau above the Karun, Iran's most effluent river. An early dam, built by the Sassanids to divert water for the town and its extensive irrigable hinterland, did not work properly. The irrigation scheme put into effect after the arrival of the Roman labour force included three steps: First, the river was redirected towards the Ab-i Gargar, a channel which branches off the Karun at a point upstream of the dam construction site, rejoining the main river some 50 km south; the island it forms, called Mianâb ("Paradise"), is known for its orchard plantations.

Then, the Band-e Kaisar was built across the dried-up riverbed, with its foundations following a winding course in search for solid strata of sandstone. As the water flowed permanently over the top, the hydraulic structure conforms to the definition of a weir rather than a dam. Estimations of the raised water level range from a few feet to 7–10 m, but was most likely in the order of 3–4 m, which was enough to supply water for the irrigation conduits on both banks during the dry season. Despite its modest height, the weir wall was quite thick (9–10 m) to accommodate the arcaded superstructure.

On top of the weir, a roadway originally supported by at least forty arches ran along its entire length of around 500 m. The pointed arches which visually dominate the present-day structure, or rather its remains, are testimony to numerous reconstruction and maintenance works executed in Islamic times. The typical clear span of the Pol-e Kaisar was between 6.6 and 9 m.

The piers, protected on their upstream side by pointed cutwaters, were of rectangular shape and pierced by high-set floodways; their considerable thickness of 5 to 6.4 m restricted the waterway by nearly one-half. By comparison, pier thicknesses of Roman bridges located within the empire’s frontiers commonly made up one-fourth of the length of the bridge and did not exceed a maximum of one-third.

The facing of the piers and the foundation consists of cut sandstone blocks bonded by mortar and joined by iron clamps; the interior was filled with Roman concrete, a building technique also observed in the Pa-i-pol bridge. On the upstream face, the river-bed was paved with large stone slabs, probably to prevent the current from undermining the dam base. One former Persian name of the dam, "Shadorvan", derives from this paving.

Finally, another smaller barrage, the Band-e Mizan, whose construction may postdate the Roman works, was erected upstream to control the flow of water into the Ab-i Gargar canal. The time it took the Roman labour force to complete the ancient Shushtar hydraulic complex is variously reported as spanning three to seven years.

The site has been referred to as "a masterpiece of creative genius" by UNESCO. Along with the hydraulic works, it also includes Selastel Castle and a tower for water level measurement, as well as a series of water mills.

== Gallery ==
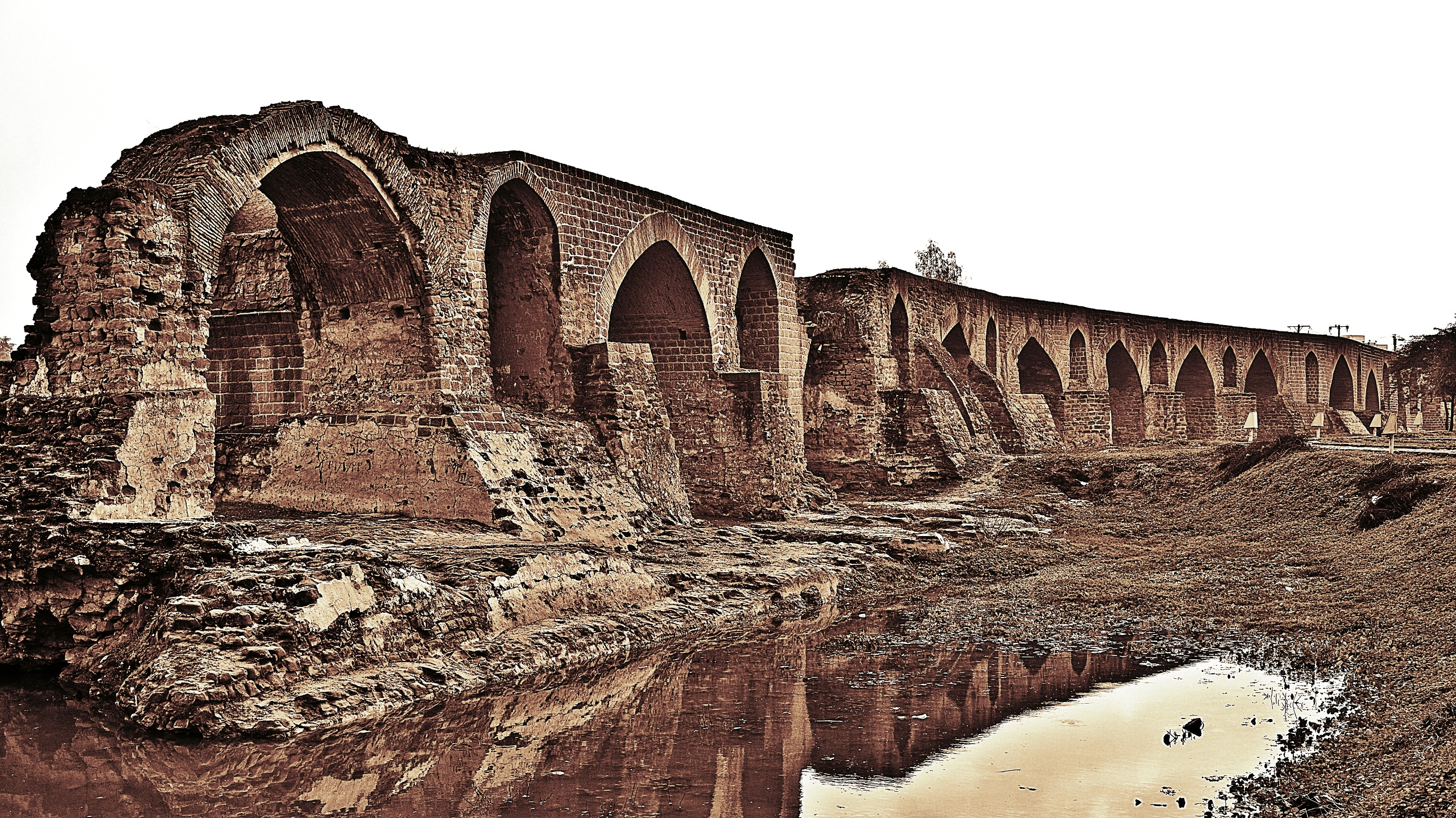

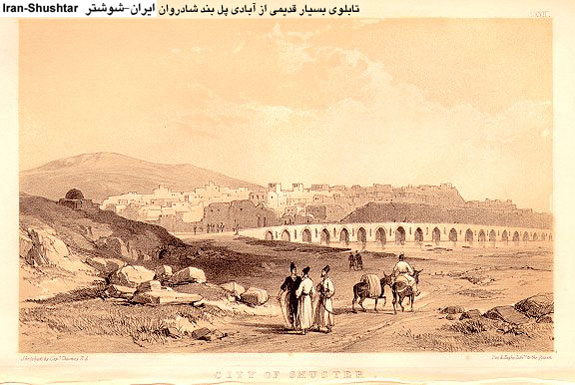

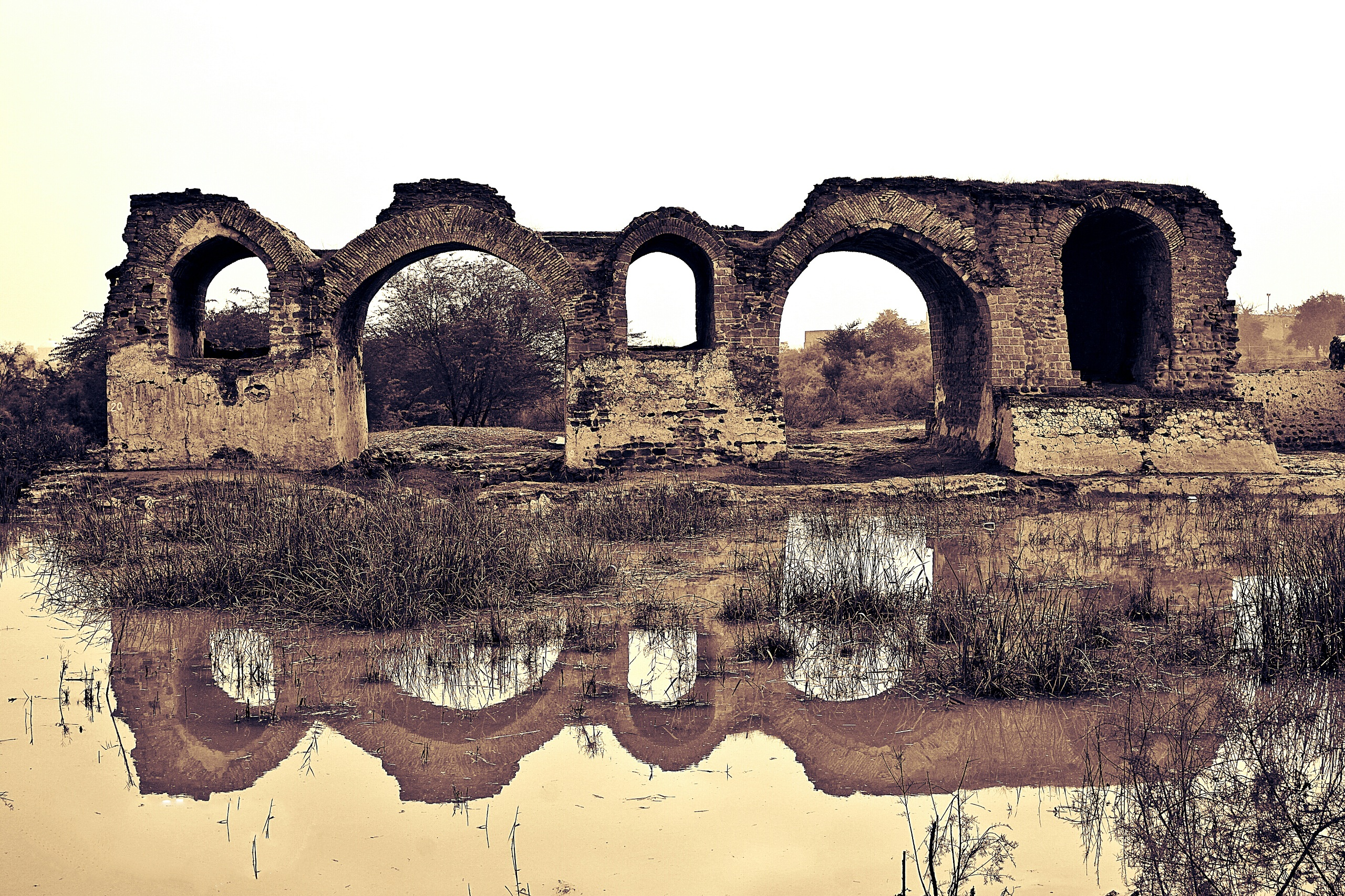

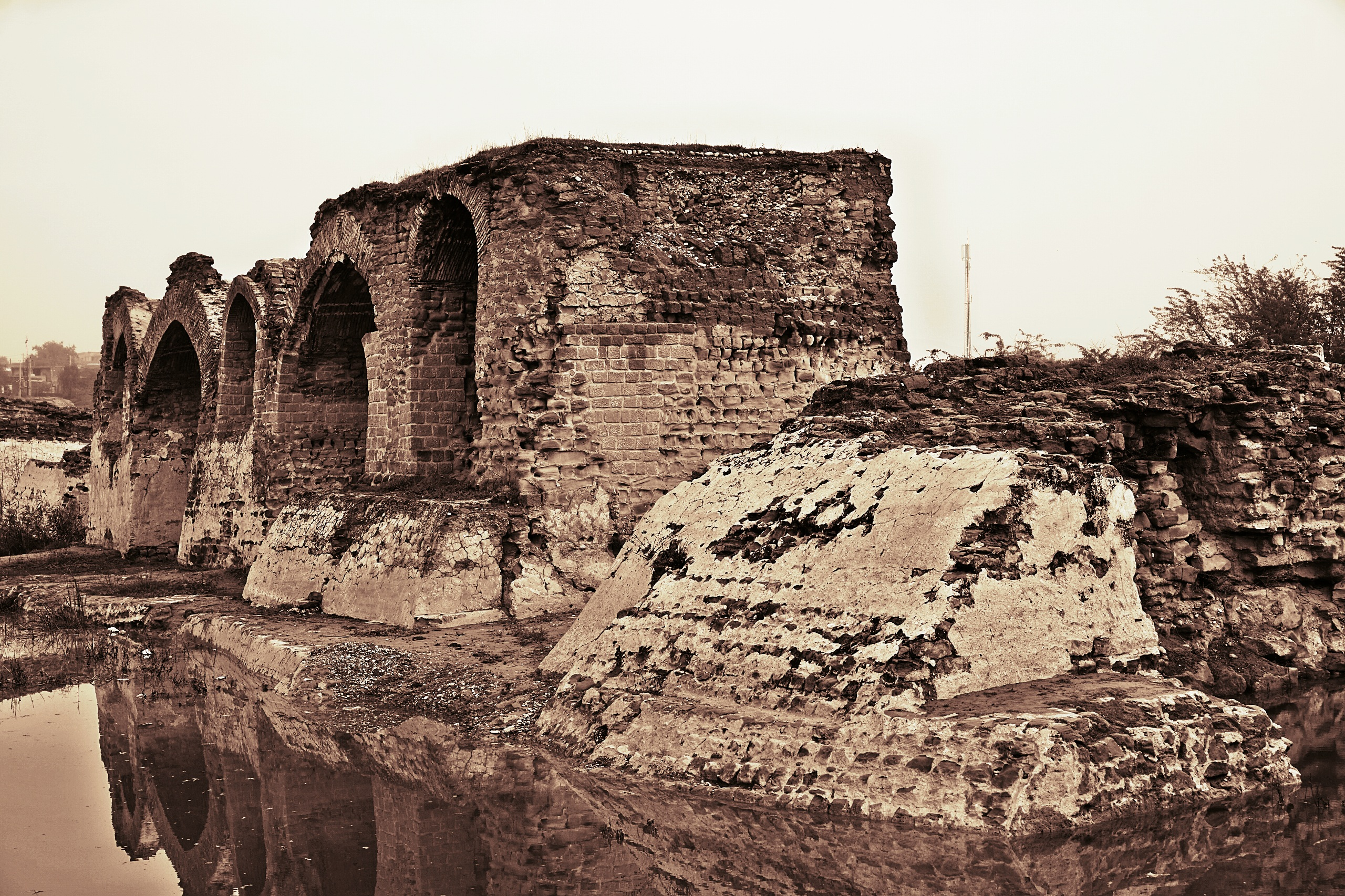

== See also ==
- List of Roman bridges
- List of Roman dams
- Romans in Persia

== Sources ==
- Chaumont, M.-L. (1964), "Les Sassanides et la christianisation de l'Empire iranien au IIIe siècle de notre ère", Revue de l'histoire des religions, 165 (2): 165–202 (170), doi:10.3406/rhr.1964.8015
- Hartung, Fritz; Kuros, Gh. R. (1987), "Historische Talsperren im Iran", in Garbrecht, Günther (ed.), Historische Talsperren, vol. 1, Stuttgart: Verlag Konrad Wittwer, pp. 221–274, ISBN 3-87919-145-X
- Hodge, A. Trevor (1992), Roman Aqueducts & Water Supply, London: Duckworth, p. 85, ISBN 0-7156-2194-7
- Hodge, A. Trevor (2000), "Reservoirs and Dams", in Wikander, Örjan (ed.), Handbook of Ancient Water Technology, Technology and Change in History, vol. 2, Leiden: Brill, pp. 331–339 (337f.), ISBN 90-04-11123-9
- Huff, Dietrich (2010), "Bridges. Pre-Islamic Bridges", in Yarshater, Ehsan (ed.), Encyclopædia Iranica Online
- Kleiss, Wolfram (1983), "Brückenkonstruktionen in Iran", Architectura, 13: 105–112 (106)
- Kramers, J. H. (2010), "Shushtar", in Bearman, P. (ed.), Encyclopaedia of Islam (2nd ed.), Brill Online
- O'Connor, Colin (1993), Roman Bridges, Cambridge University Press, p. 130 (No. E42), ISBN 0-521-39326-4
- Schnitter, Niklaus (1978), "Römische Talsperren", Antike Welt, 8 (2): 25–32 (32)
- Smith, Norman (1971), A History of Dams, London: Peter Davies, pp. 56–61, ISBN 0-432-15090-0
- Vogel, Alexius (1987), "Die historische Entwicklung der Gewichtsmauer", in Garbrecht, Günther (ed.), Historische Talsperren, vol. 1, Stuttgart: Verlag Konrad Wittwer, pp. 47–56 (50), ISBN 3-87919-145-X
