= Cornalvo Dam =

Roman dam in Mérida, Spain

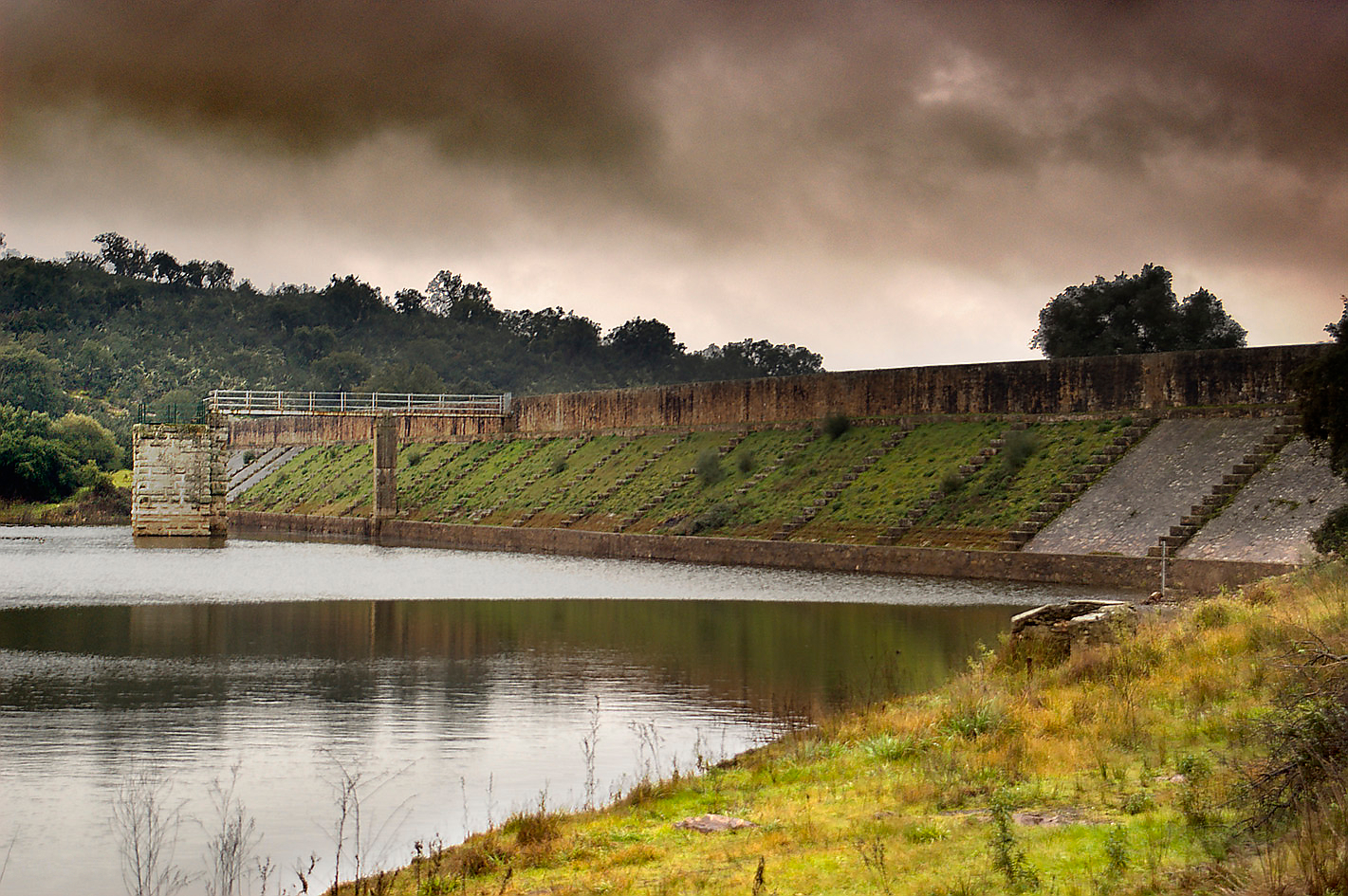
- Roman Cornalvo dam in Spain
- Interactive map of Cornalvo Dam
- Location: Mérida (Badajoz), Spain
- Coordinates: 38°59′18″N 6°11′28″W
- Opening date: 1st–2nd century

Dam and spillways
- Impounds: Albarregas (Guadiana basin)
- Height: 28 m (92 ft)
- Length: 194 m (636 ft)
- Width (base): 26 m (85 ft)

UNESCO World Heritage Site
- Official name: Cornalvo Dam
- Type: Cultural
- Criteria: iii, iv
- Designated: 1993 (17th session)
- Part of: Archaeological Ensemble of Mérida
- Reference no.: 664-013
- Region: Europe and North America

Spanish Cultural Heritage
- Official name: Pantano romano de Cornalvo
- Type: Non-movable
- Criteria: Monument
- Designated: 13 December 1912
- Reference no.: RI-51-0000115

The Cornalvo Dam is a Roman gravity dam built to supply water to the Roman colonia of Emerita Augusta (present-day Mérida, Spain), capital of the Roman province of Lusitania. It was built in the 1st–2nd century AD as part of the infrastructure which supplied water. The earth dam Roman concrete and stone cladding on the water face is still in use.

The dam is part of the Archaeological Ensemble of Mérida, which is one of the largest and most extensive archaeological sites in Spain and that was declared a World Heritage Site by UNESCO in 1993.

== See also ==
- List of Roman dams and reservoirs
- Roman architecture
- Roman engineering
