= Tibi Dam =

16th-century dam in Valencia, Spain

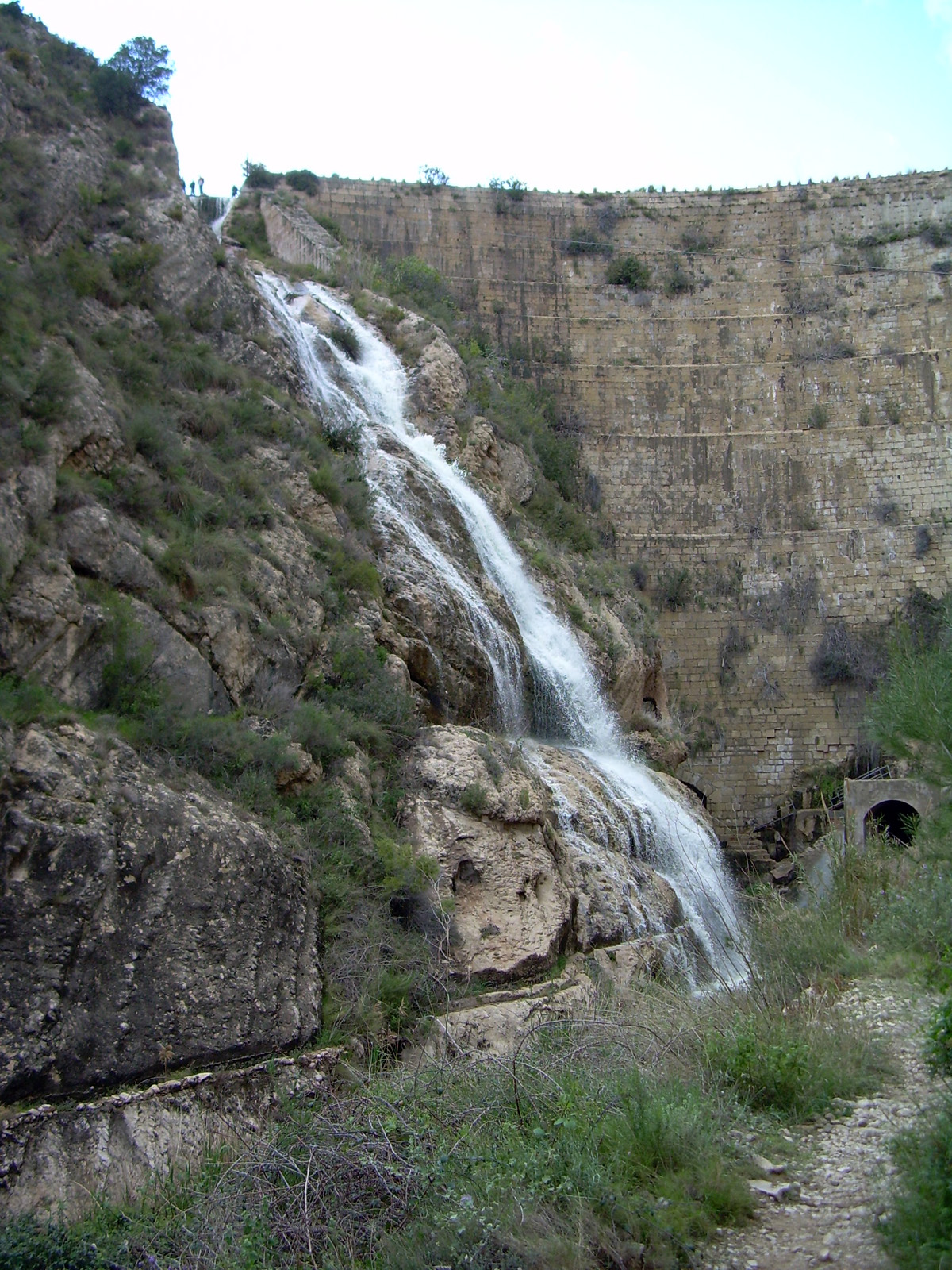

- Location within Spain
- Official name: Presa Tibi
- Country: Spain
- Coordinates: 38°30′2.35″N 0°33′28.35″W
- Purpose: Irrigation
- Status: Operational
- Construction began: 1579
- Opening date: 1594

Dam and spillways
- Type of dam: Masonry
- Height: 65 m (213 ft)
- Height (thalweg): 42 m (138 ft)

Reservoir
- Total capacity: 3,690,776 m^{3} (2,992.161 acre⋅ft)

The Tibi Dam (in Spanish embalse de Tibi) is a masonry dam on Monegre River about three kilometres (two miles) south of Tibi in Valencian Community, Spain. It is one of the oldest non-Roman dams in Europe. It was constructed between 1579 and 1594 with the purpose of using its reservoir to help irrigate areas around Tibi. A spillway was constructed on the right side of the dam in 1697 after it partially failed due to flooding.
