= Lake Homs Dam =

Ancient dam near Homs, Syria

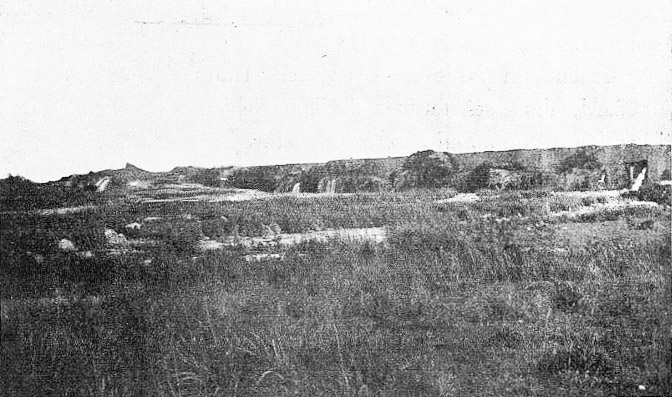
- Downstream view of Lake Homs Dam in 1921
- Interactive map of Lake Homs Dam
- Location: near Homs, Syria
- Coordinates: 34.662604°N 36.617836°E
- Opening date: 284 AD

Dam and spillways
- Height: 7 metres (23 ft)
- Length: 2,000 metres (6,600 ft)
- Width (base): 20 metres (66 ft)

Reservoir
- Creates: Lake Homs
- Total capacity: 200 million cubic metres (260×10^{6} cu yd)

The Lake Homs Dam, also known as Qattinah Dam, is a Roman-built dam near the city of Homs, Syria, which is in use to this day.

== History ==
Contrary to an older hypothesis which tentatively linked the origins of the dam to Egyptian ruler Sethi (1319–1304 BC), the structure dates to 284 AD when it was built by the Roman emperor Diocletian (284–305 AD) for irrigation purposes. With a capacity of 90 million m^{3}, it is considered the largest Roman reservoir in the Near East and might have even been the largest artificial reservoir constructed up to that time. Remarkably, the reservoir has suffered very little silting since.

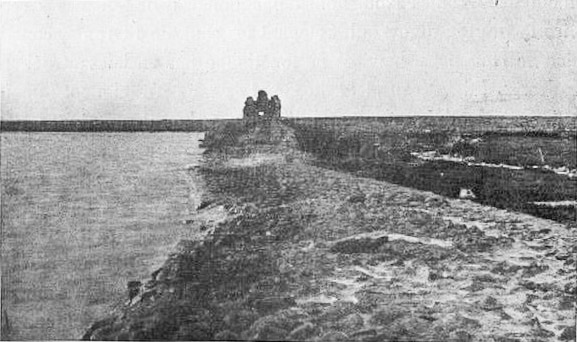
Lake Homs Dam, with its Roman tower, 1921

The 2 km long and 7 m high masonry gravity dam consists of a Roman concrete core protected by basalt blocks. The slightly pointed curvature of the dam follows the course of a long ridge of basalt and thus bears only superficial resemblance to an arch dam.

In 1938, the level of the dam was raised, increasing the volume of water the artificial lake holds to 200 million m^{3}.

== See also ==
- Al-Rastan Dam – located downstream
- List of Roman dams and reservoirs
- Roman architecture
- Roman engineering

== Sources ==
- Hodge, A. Trevor (1992), Roman Aqueducts & Water Supply, London: Duckworth, p. 91, ISBN 0-7156-2194-7
- Hodge, A. Trevor (2000), "Reservoirs and Dams", in Wikander, Örjan (ed.), Handbook of Ancient Water Technology, Technology and Change in History, vol. 2, Leiden: Brill, p. 338, ISBN 90-04-11123-9
- Schnitter, Niklaus (1978), "Römische Talsperren", Antike Welt, 8 (2): 25–32
- Smith, Norman (1971), A History of Dams, London: Peter Davies, pp. 39–43, ISBN 0-432-15090-0
