= Kurit Dam =

Dam in South Khorasan, Iran

- Location within Iran
- Interactive map of Kurit Dam
- Location: Tabas, Tabas County, South Khorasan Province, Iran
- Construction began: 14th century

Dam and spillways
- Type of dam: Arch-gravity
- Impounds: Kurit River
- Height: 64 metres (210 ft)
- Length: 29 metres (95 ft)

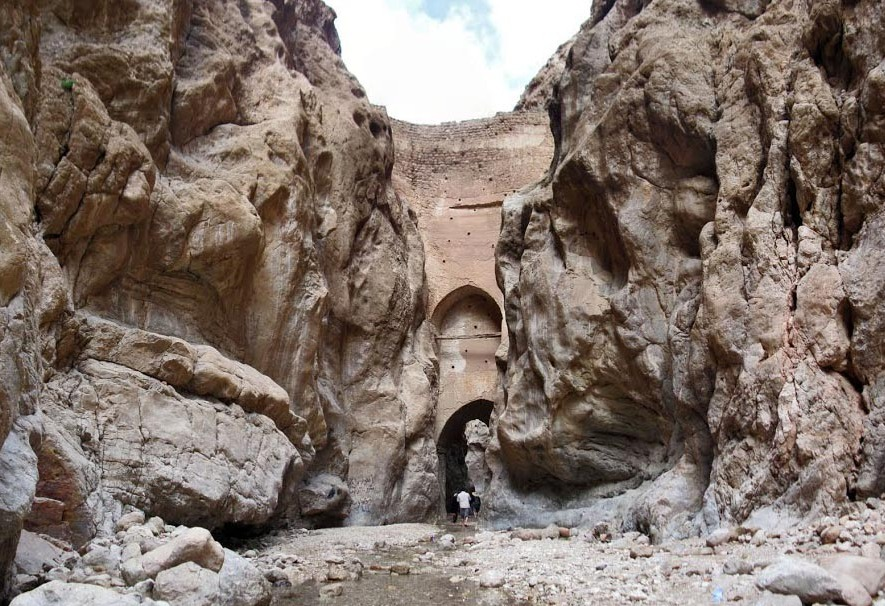
Shāh Abbās Arch near Kurit Dam – 14th century

The Kurit Dam (Persian: سد کریت or سد کوریت) is a decommissioned arch-gravity dam at the edge of Iran's Dasht-e Kavir. It is located 56 km away from Tabas, Iran, near the eponymous village of Kurit. With a height of 64 metres (210 ft) above its foundation, the Kurit Dam was the tallest dam in the world from its creation in the 14th century until the early 20th century.

== Dam ==
The dam was originally 60 m tall but 4 m of height was added in 1850. The dam also contained a water outlet system considered sophisticated for its time. The dam was originally built via limestone masonry with lime, and the addition in 1850 was built via bricks and stone.

Currently, the dam does not impound a reservoir, as another dam was built in 2005, and a large segment of its lower downstream face has fallen off. Behind the dam, where the reservoir existed, is now full of silt with the exception of directly behind the upstream face which has been excavated.

== History ==
Kurit Dam belongs to the post-Islamic historical periods and is located in the village of Kurit, Tabas city, Iran. This dam was constructed of irregular and regular stone material as well as bricks and was employed by the locals for about seven centuries.

== See also ==
- List of dams and reservoirs in Iran
