= Buttress dam =

Dam with a supported solid, watertight side

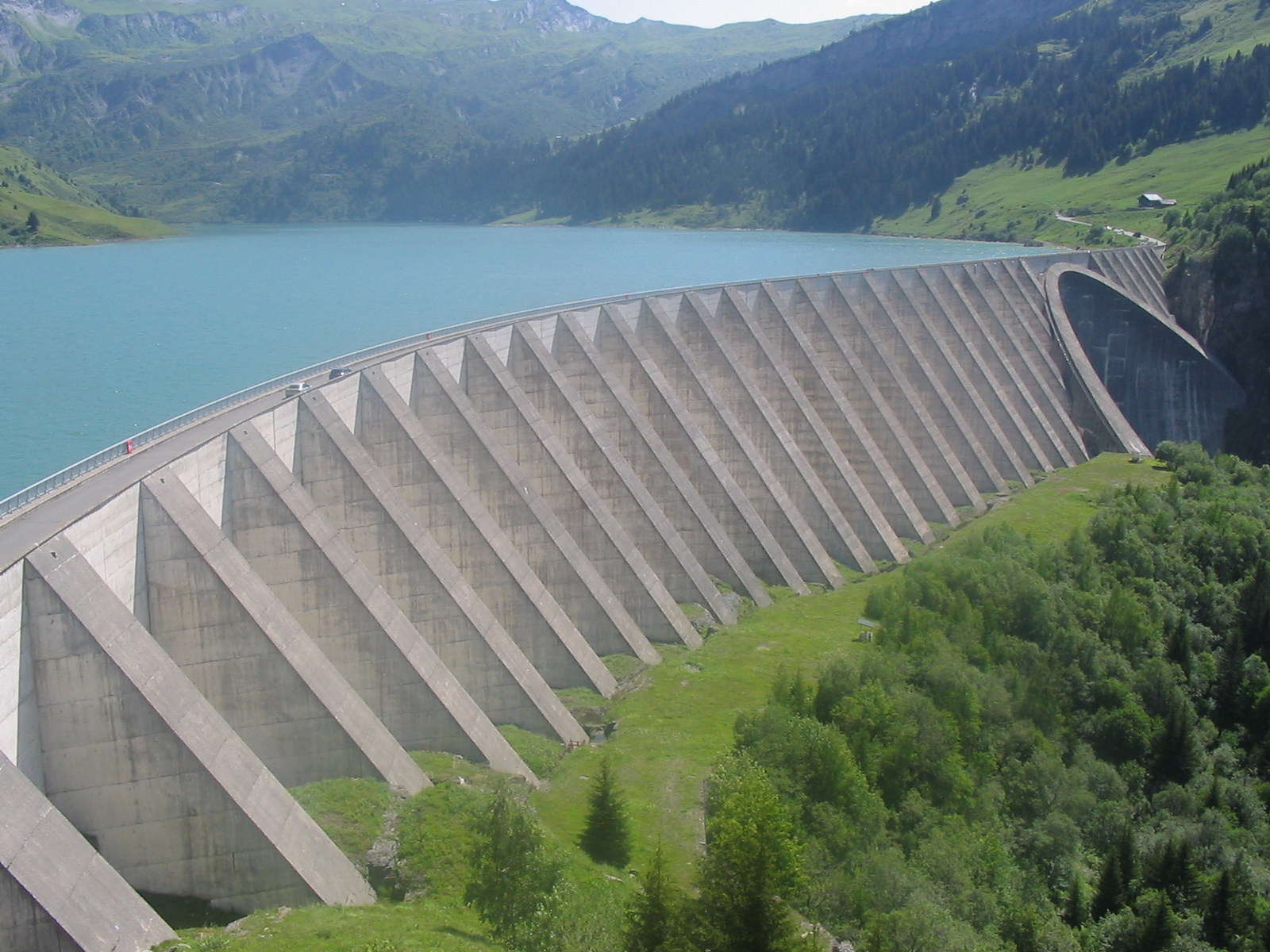
Buttresses and an arch of the Roselend Dam in France

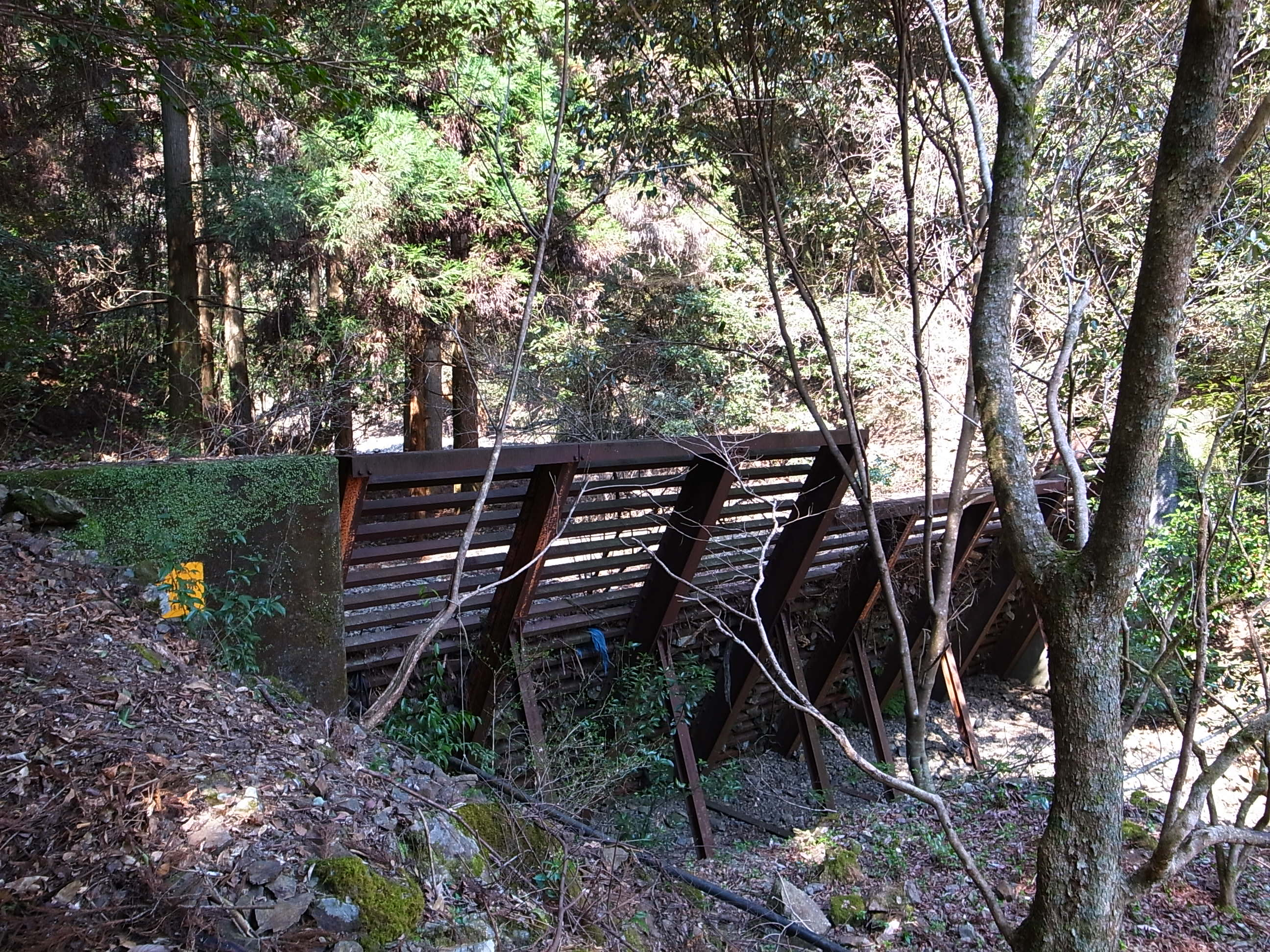
Buttressed check dam in Japan

A buttress dam, also called a hollow gravity dam or hollow dam, is a dam with a solid, water-tight upstream side that is supported at intervals on the downstream side by a series of buttresses, or supports. The dam wall may be straight or curved. Most buttress dams are made of reinforced concrete and are heavy, pushing the dam into the ground. Water pushes against the dam, but the buttresses are inflexible and prevent the dam from falling over.

Buttress dams were originally built to retain water for irrigation or mining in areas of scarce or expensive resources but cheap labour. A buttress dam is a good choice in wide valleys where solid rock is rare.

As designs have become more sophisticated, the virtues and weaknesses of buttress dams have become apparent. The Romans were the first to use buttresses to increase the stability of a dam wall.

Buttress dams of slab concrete construction became popular in the United States in the early 20th century with the patented process of Norwegian-American civil engineer Nils F. Ambursen.

== Construction ==
Buttressed dams are so-called 'permitted dams'. They consist of piers of triangular cross-section with a free space between the piers and a sloping wall on the water side. The loads from the horizontal water head are transmitted underground through the wall and the columns. The load on the ground is relatively high due to the small footprint, which is why column foundations require a sufficiently load-bearing foundation.

Depending on the shape of the pillars and the slab or vault water wall, a distinction is made between:

- Pier dam
- Hohlpfeilerstaumauer
- Pillar slab dam
- Pillar vaulted dam
