= Stag House =

House in Sighișoara, Romania

Coordinates: 46.2197475°N 24.790231°E

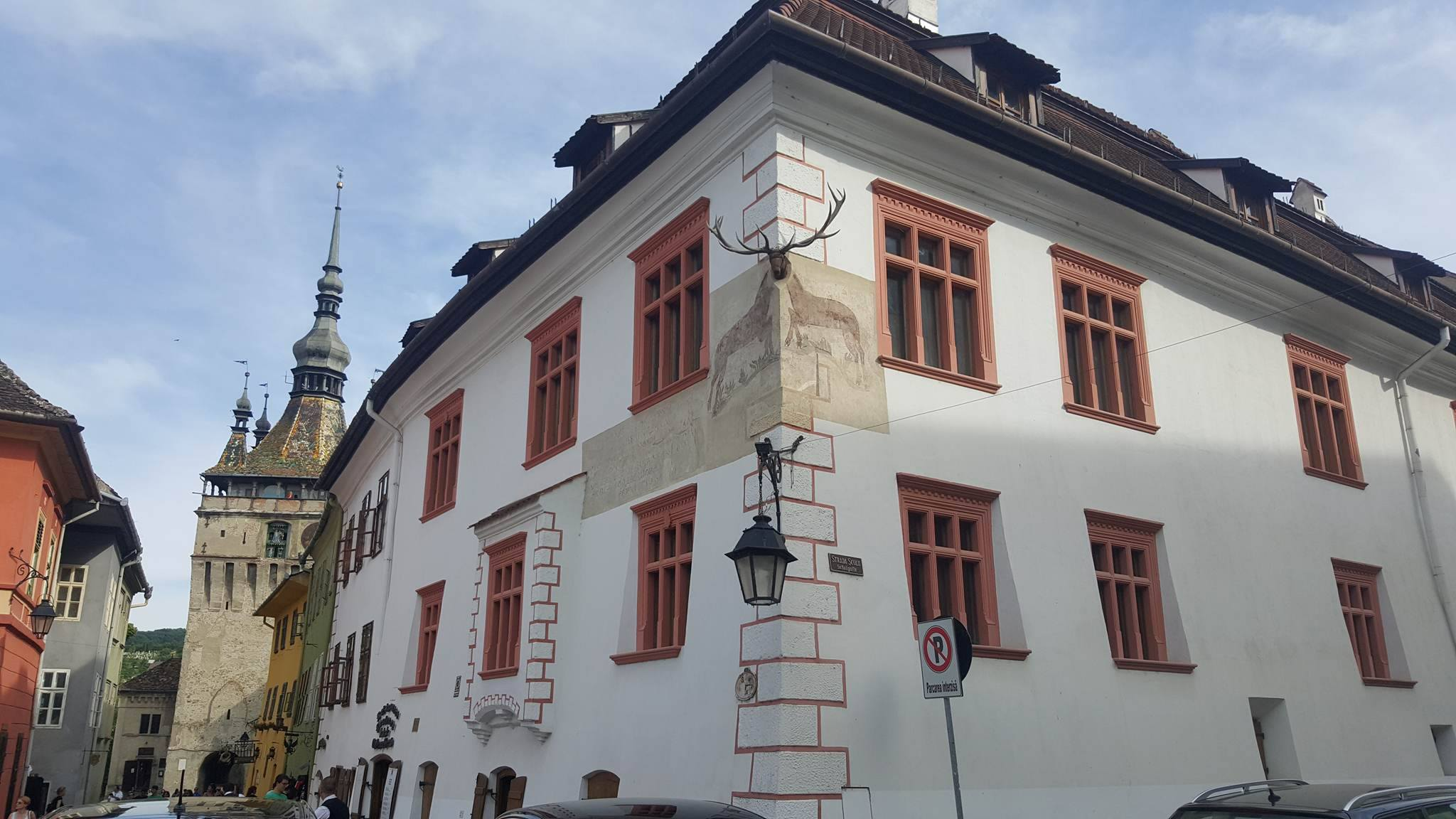
Stag House

The Stag House (Casa cu Cerb in Romanian) is the most preserved house of Sighișoara, Romania, and it was built in the 17th century. It was called so because of the stag head fixed on the corner of the building.
