= Guilders' Association House =

Coordinates: 46.21799°N 24.79437°E

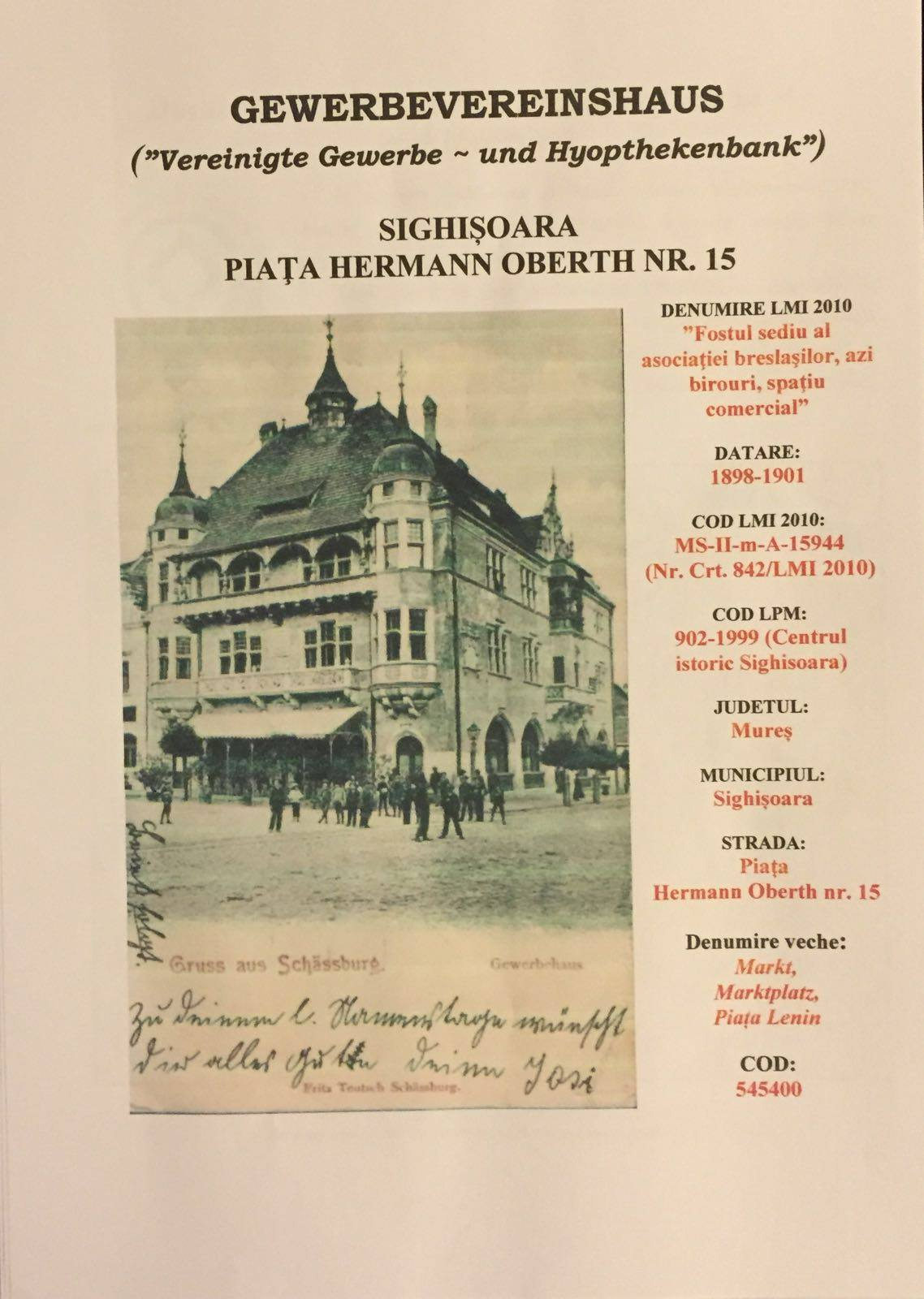
Guilders' Association House

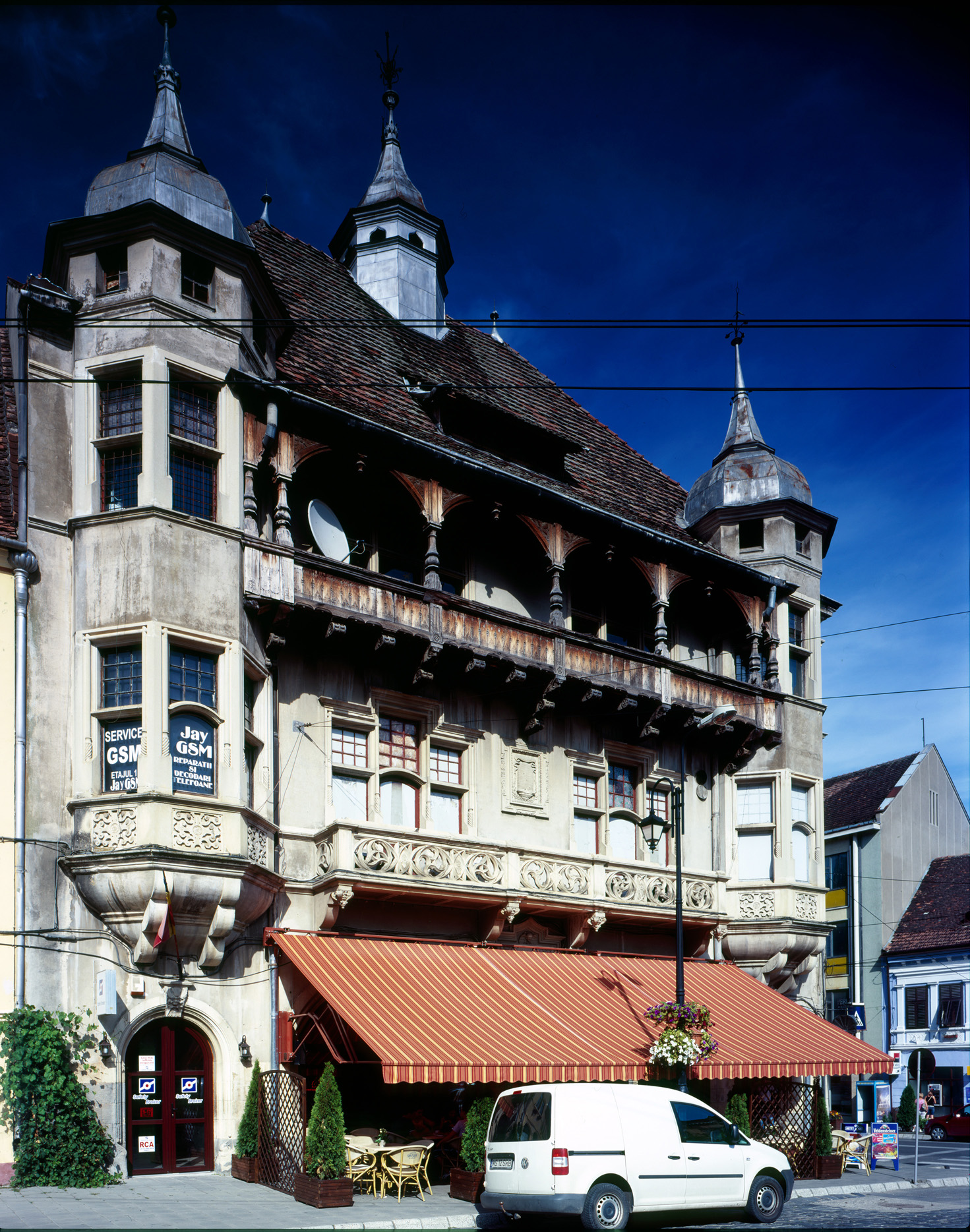
Photograph

The Guilders' Association House (Romanian: Casa Asociației Meșteșugărești; German: Gewerbevereinshaus) is a historic monument located in Sighișoara, Mureș County, Romania.
