= Tanners' Tower =

Coordinates: 46°13′07″N 24°47′33″E

The Tanners' Tower (Romanian: Turnul Tăbăcarilor, German: Gerberturm) in Sighişoara, belonging to Mureș County, Romania, was built around the 13th –14th centuries in the southeastern part of the city. It has a square plan, with a small, sloping roof in a single direction. This tower was supposed to guard and protect the courtyard of the Clock Tower.

Its shape and position retracted behind the wall recommend it as one of the old towers, perhaps even the first one of the city. This tower with archaic aspect was not affected in any way by the fire in 1676. To defend the tower, tanneries used to have: a double arquebuse as well as a simple one, a musket, three hundred pounds of gunpowder and some cannonballs
