= Tinsmiths' Tower =

Coordinates: 46°13′06″N 24°47′32″E

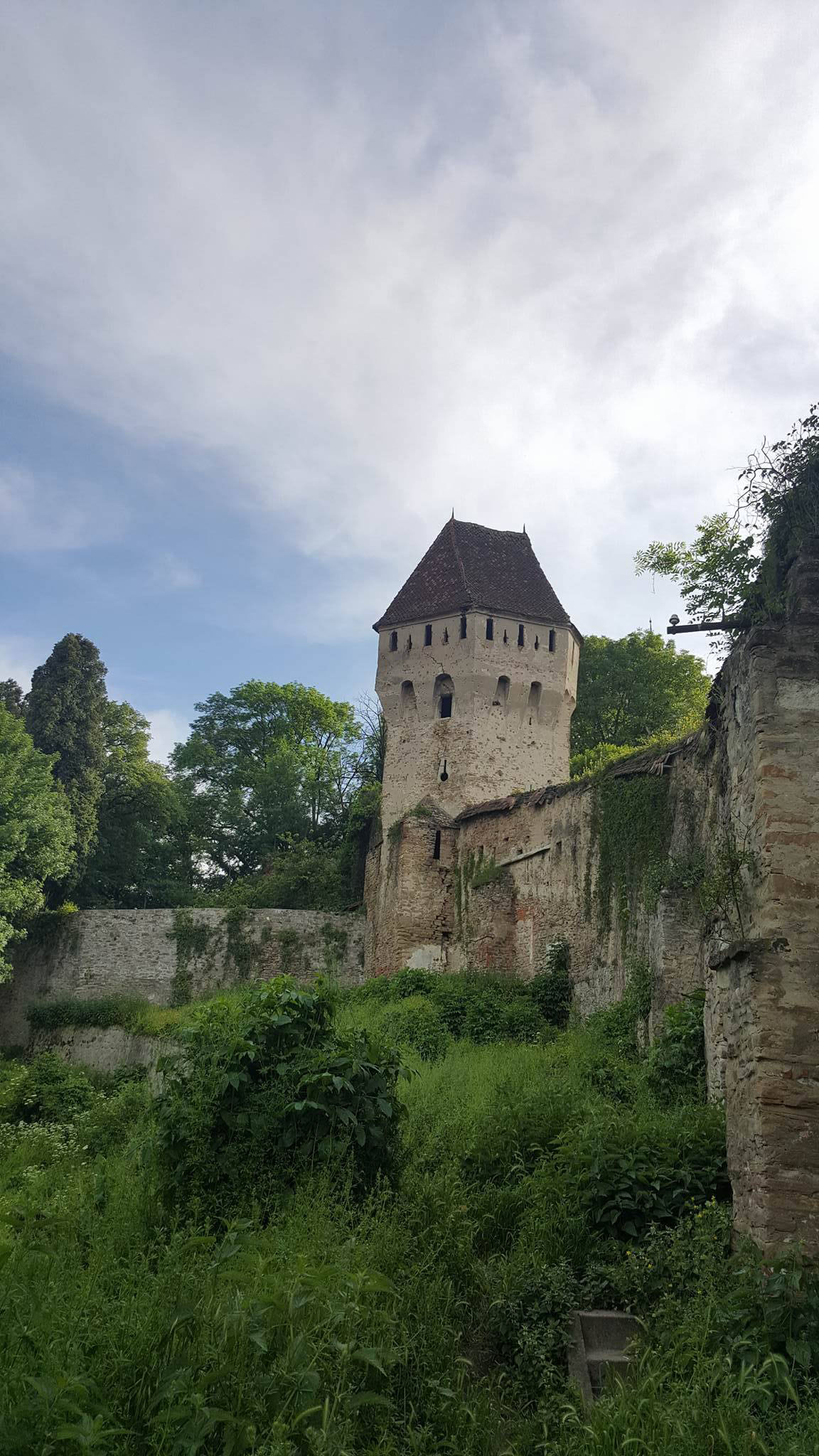
Tinsmiths' Tower

The Tinsmiths' Tower (Romanian: Turnul Cositorarilor, German: Zinngießerturm) is one of the nine towers located in the citadel of Sighișoara, belonging to Mureș County in Romania. It has the most expressive architecture: 25 meters high, the tower starts with a square base (part of the old tower), right after the brick trunk stands in pentagonal shape and above suddenly widens and becomes octagonal. The roof, slightly unbalanced, has a hexagonal plan and the woodwork inside is a veritable masterpiece of carpenters of Sighisoara. The Tin Tower, together with the Clock Tower, has an exceptional defensive position.

== Restorations ==
In 1583 several repairs were made and it is assumed that the small pentagonal bastion, with its opening to the Lower Town, was built during that time. The Tower facades still retrains traces of bullets during the siege of Hungarians from 1704 to 1706.
