= Sighișoara =

Sighișoara German: Schäßburg Transylvanian Saxon: Scheeßprich
- Municipality
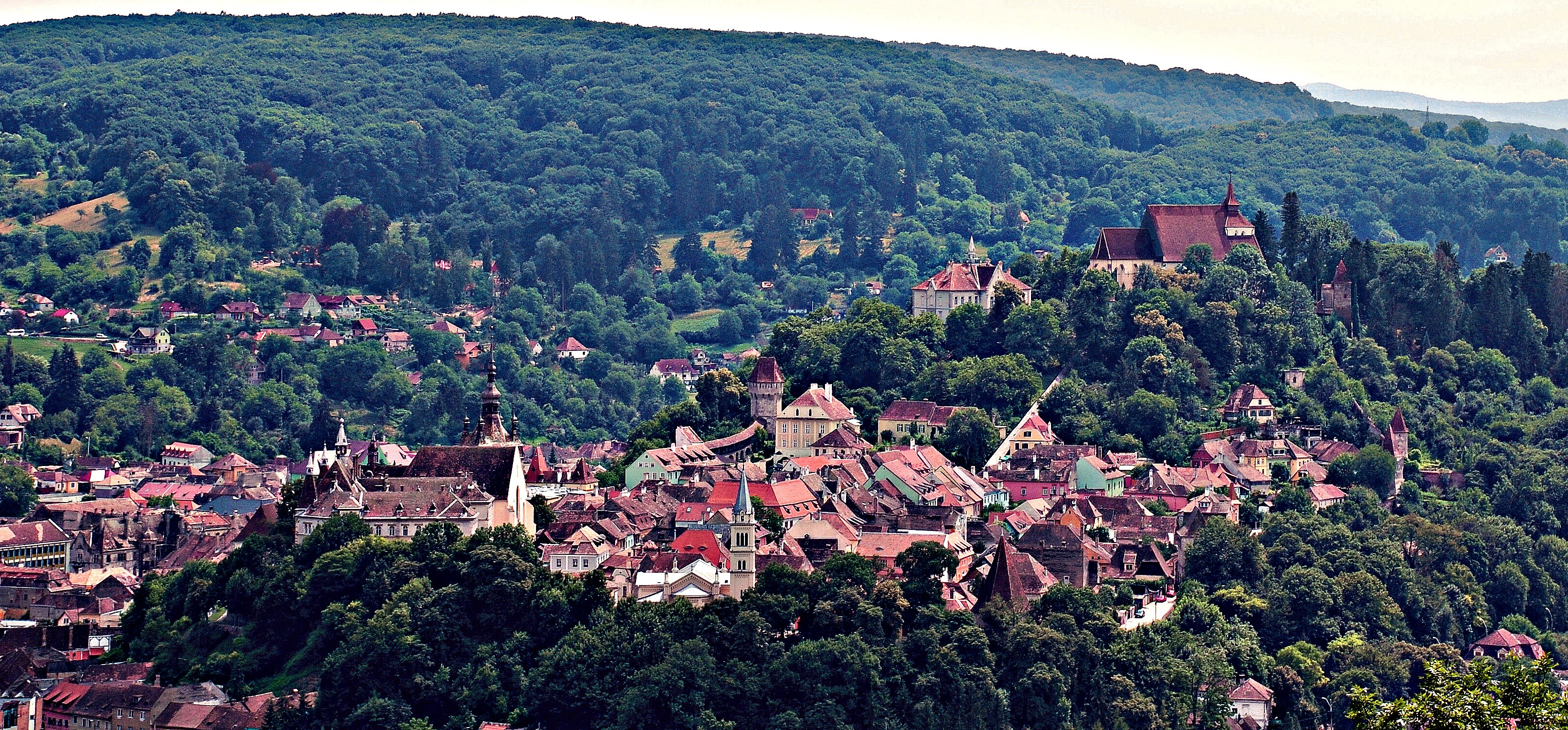
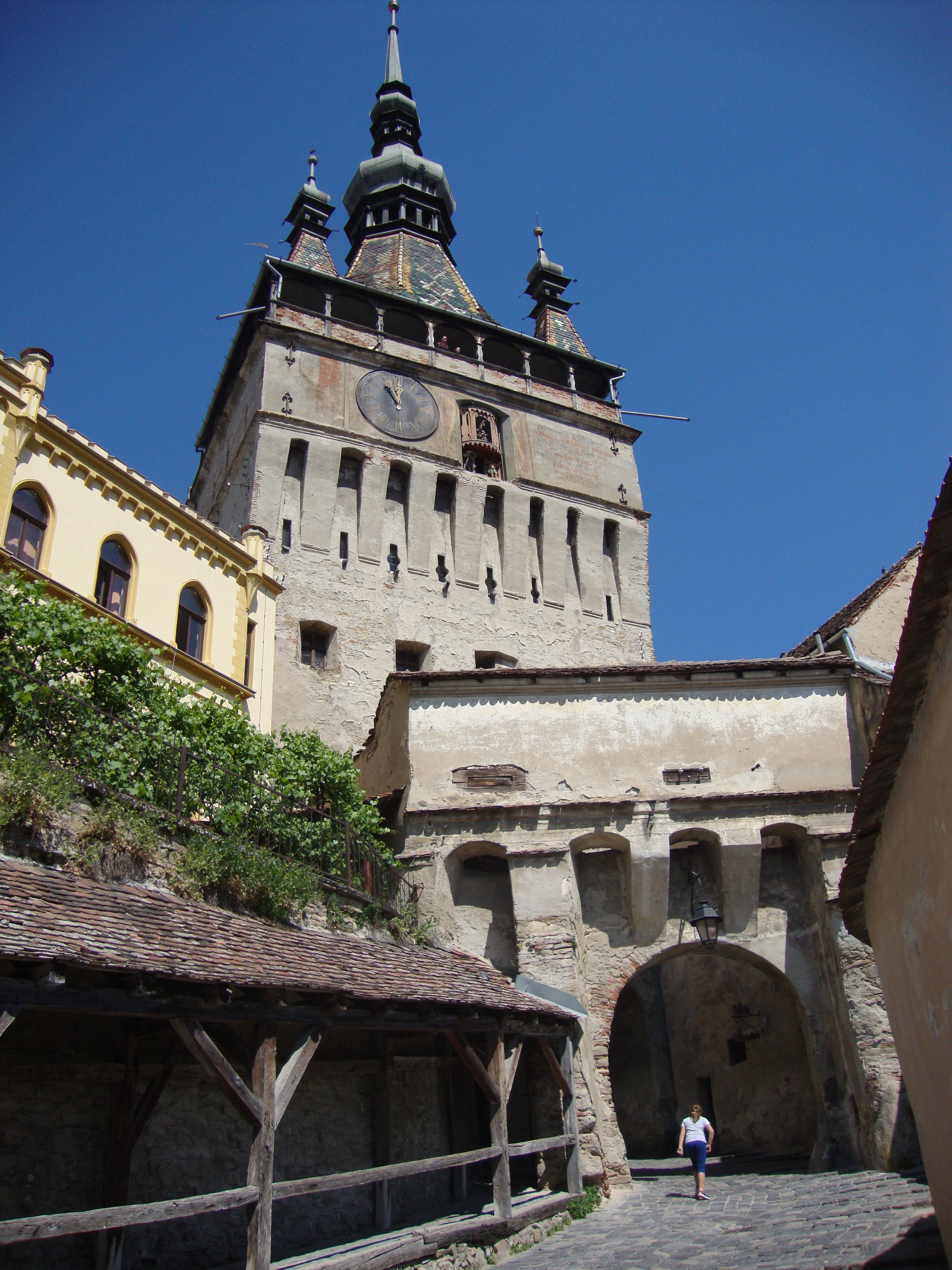
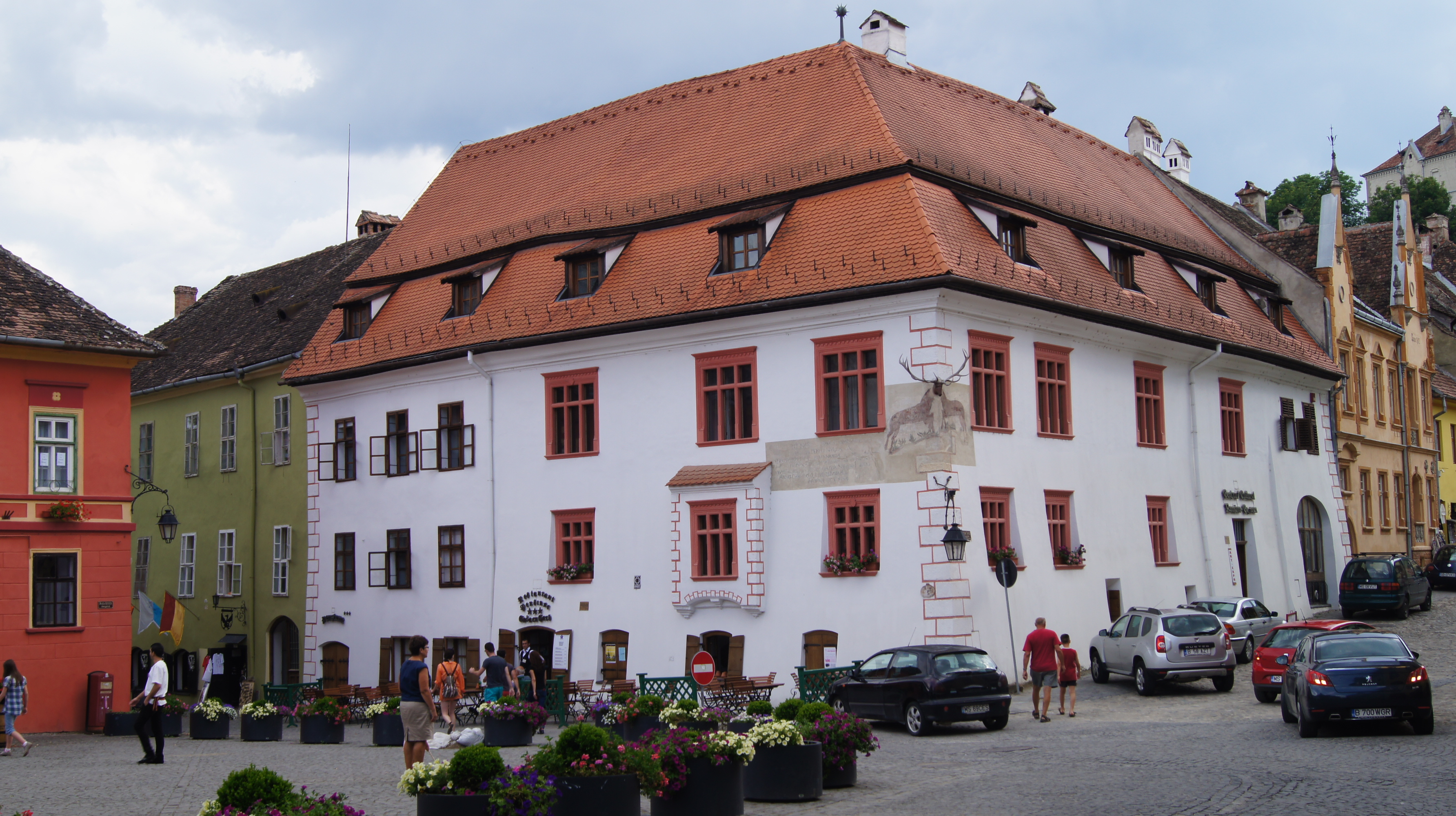
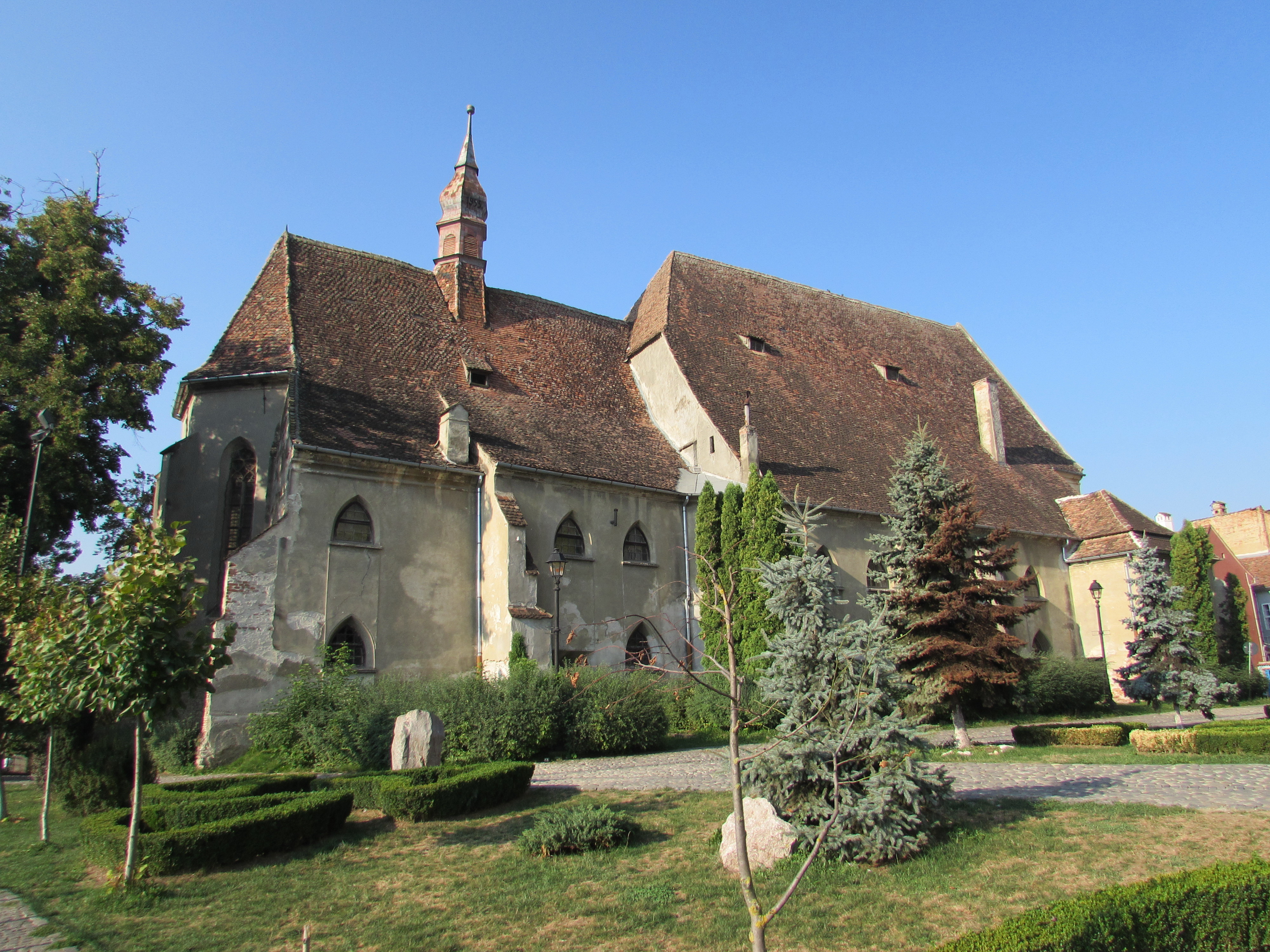
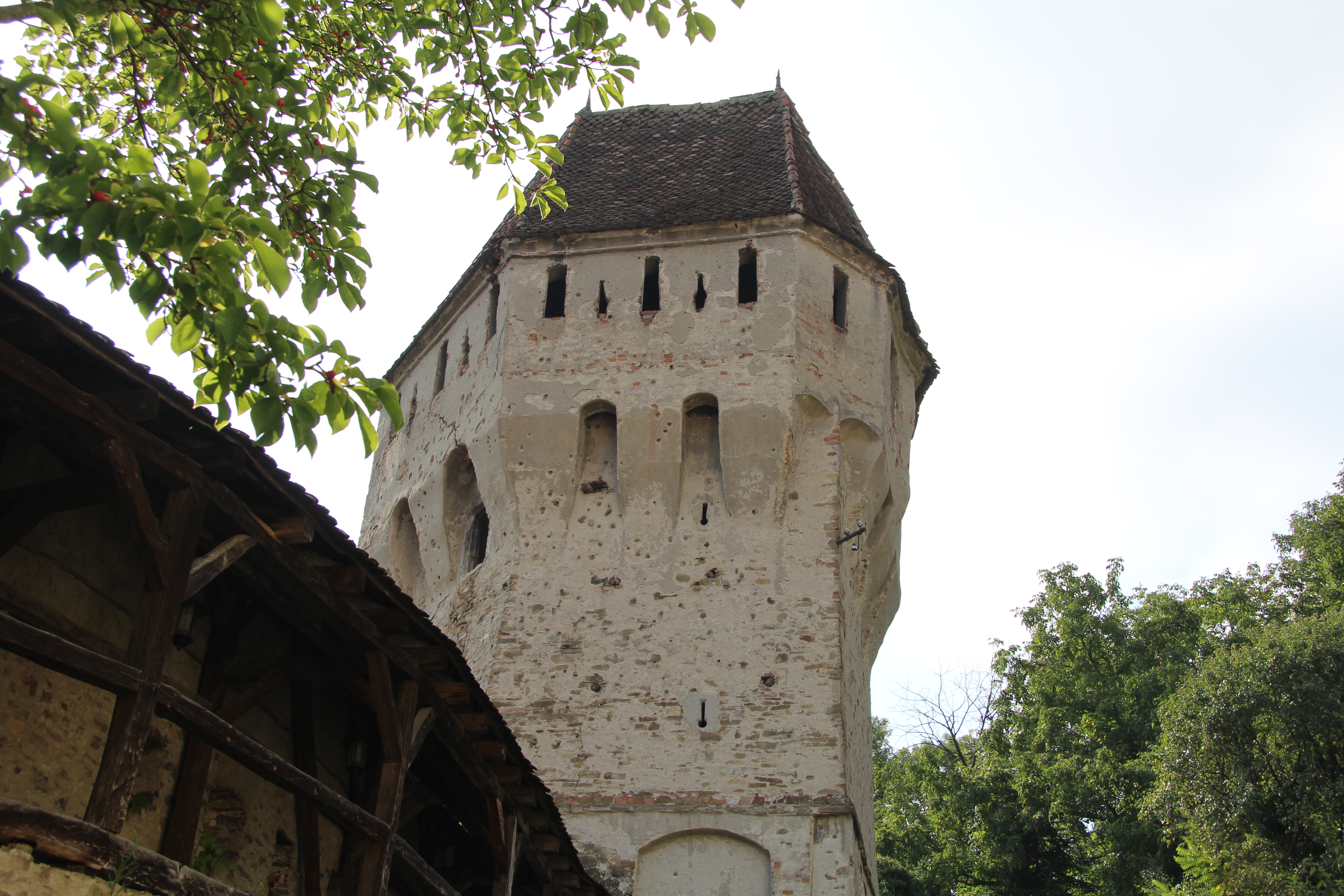
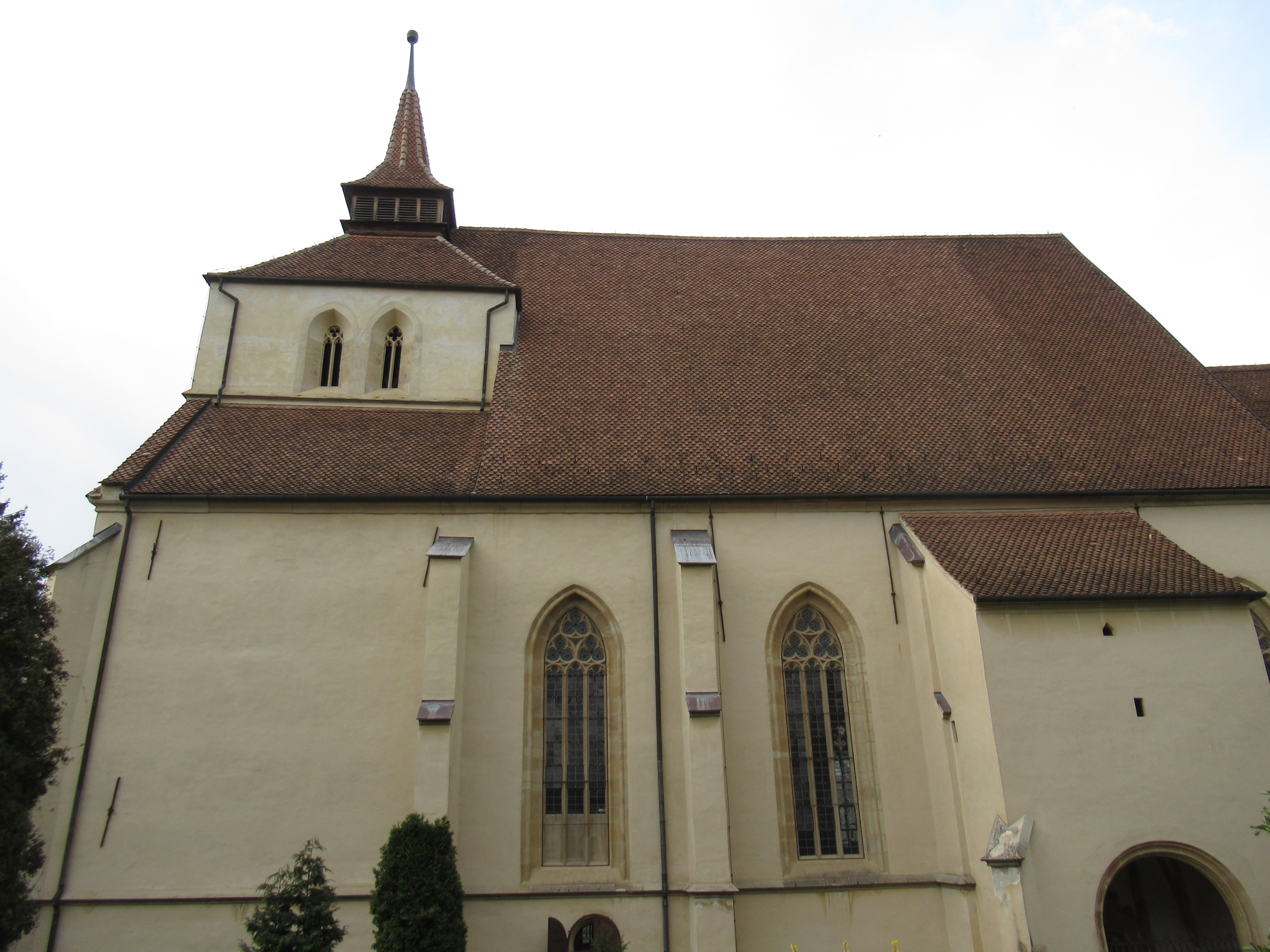
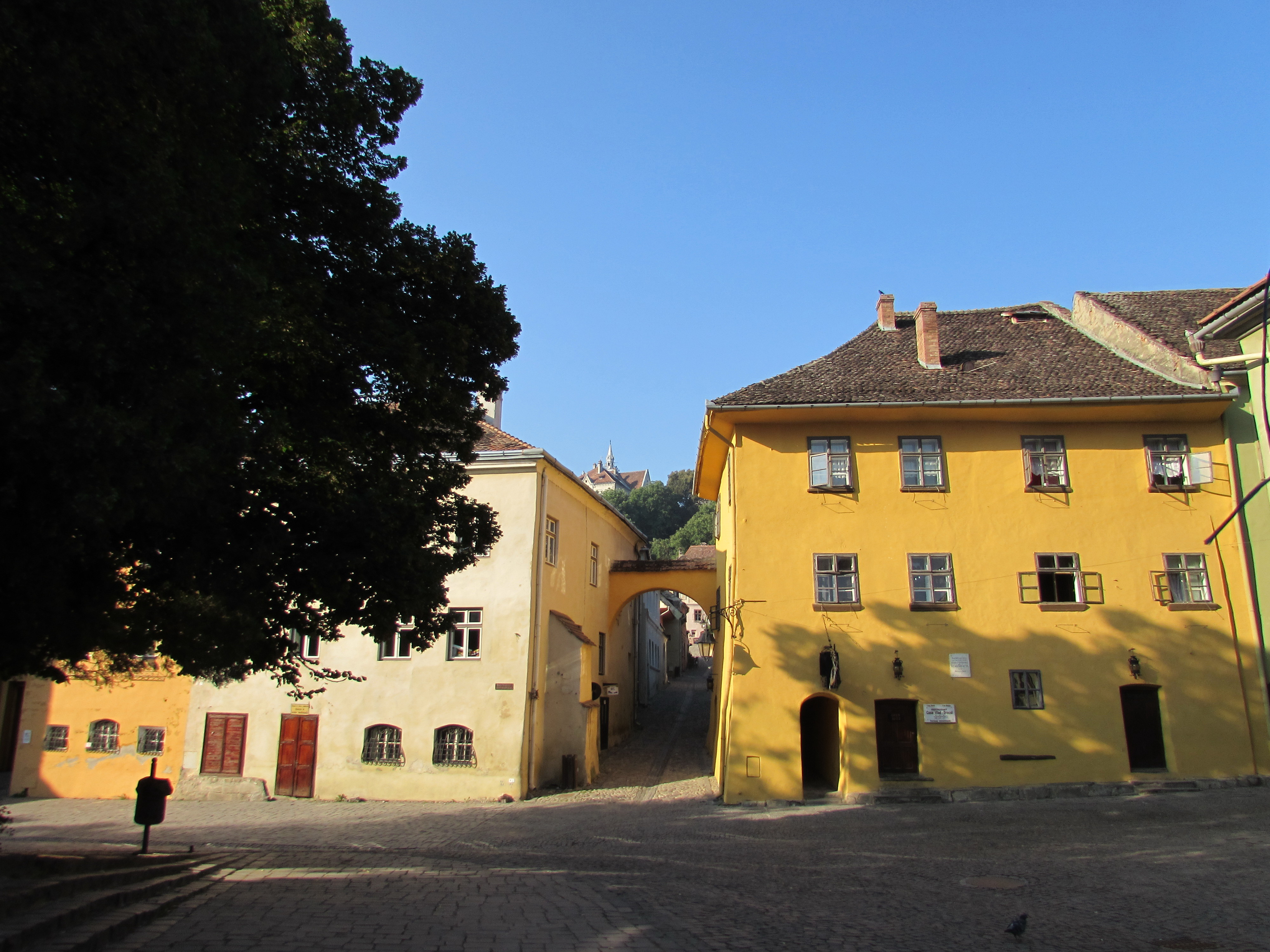
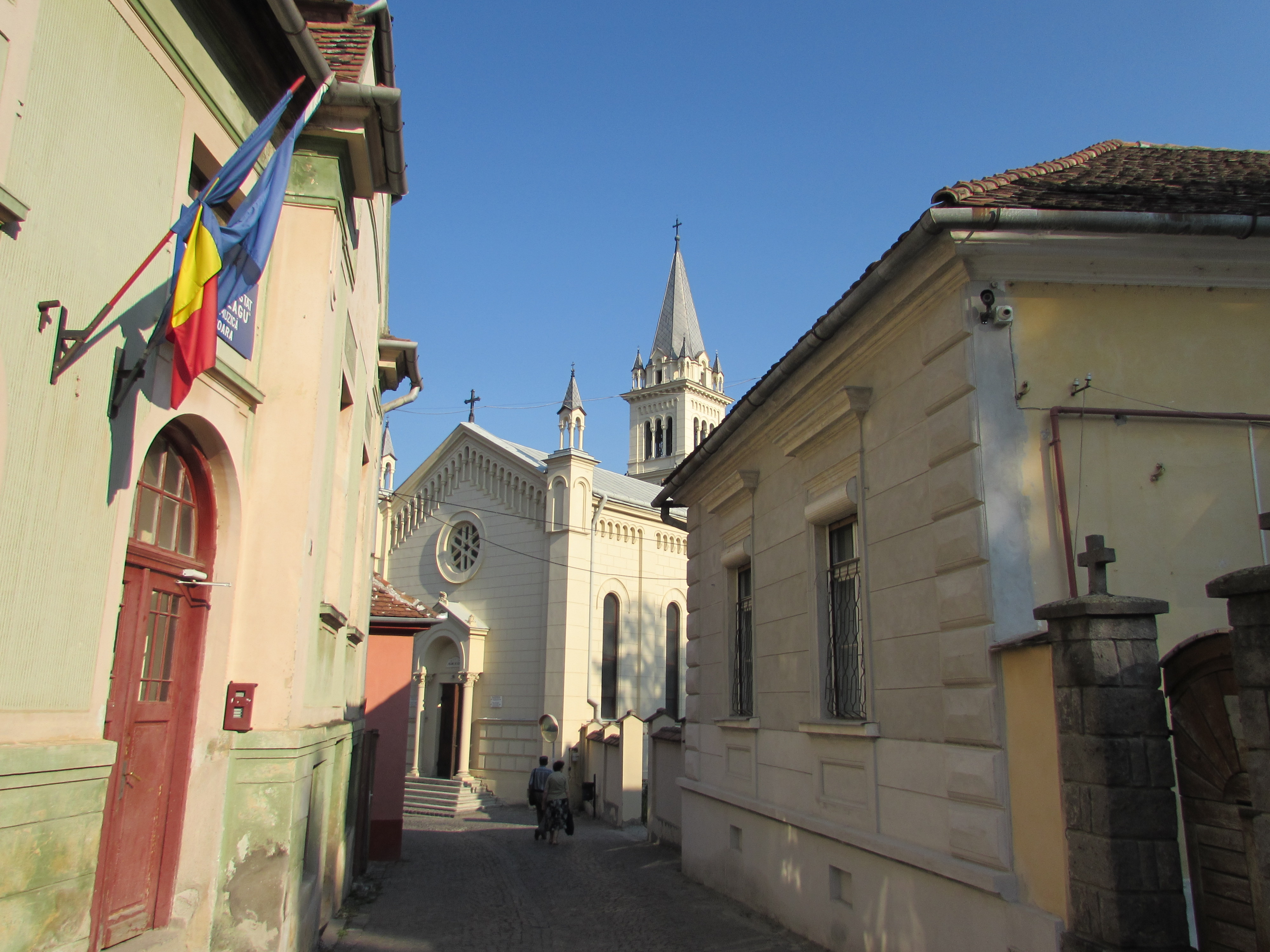
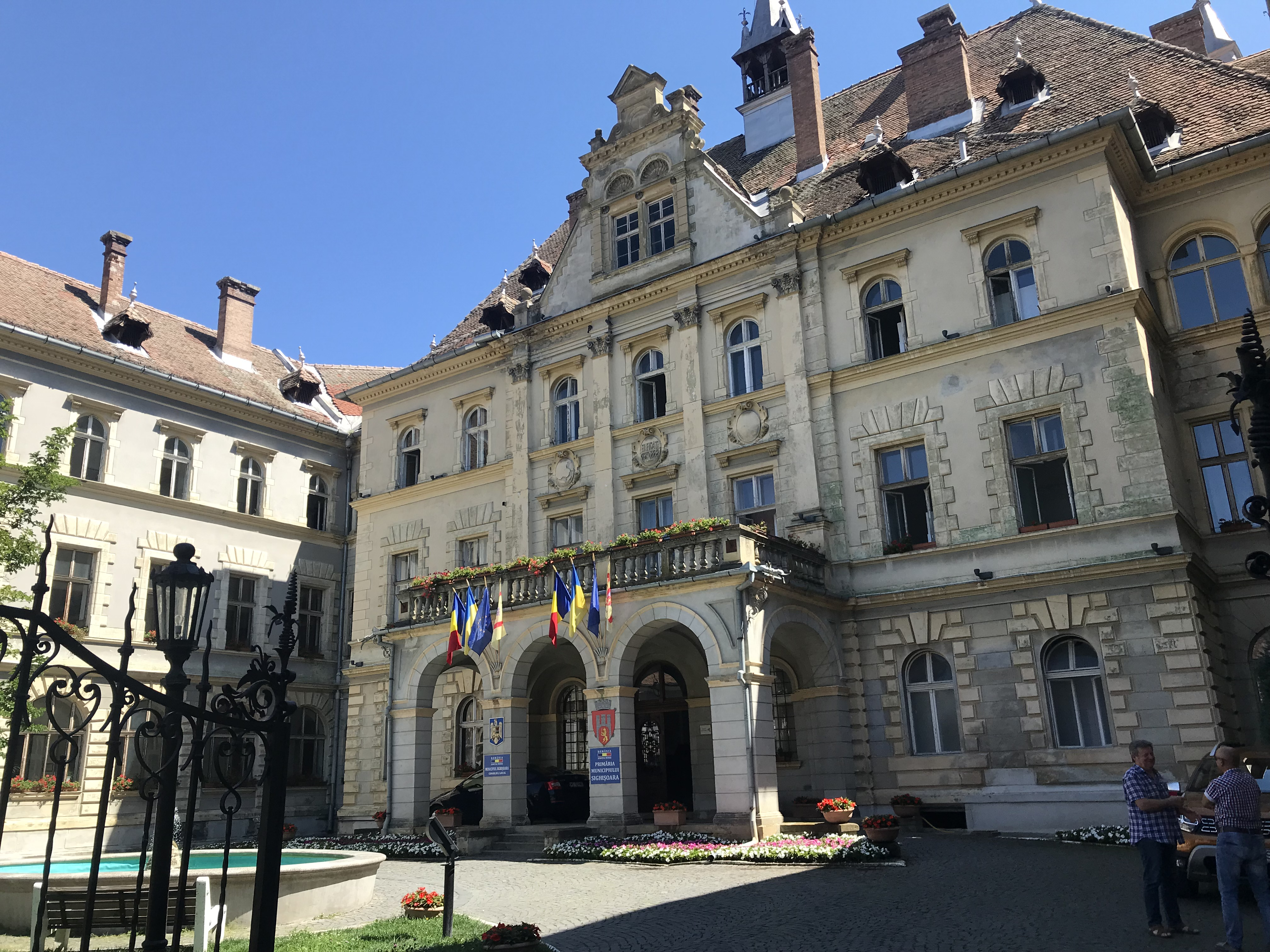
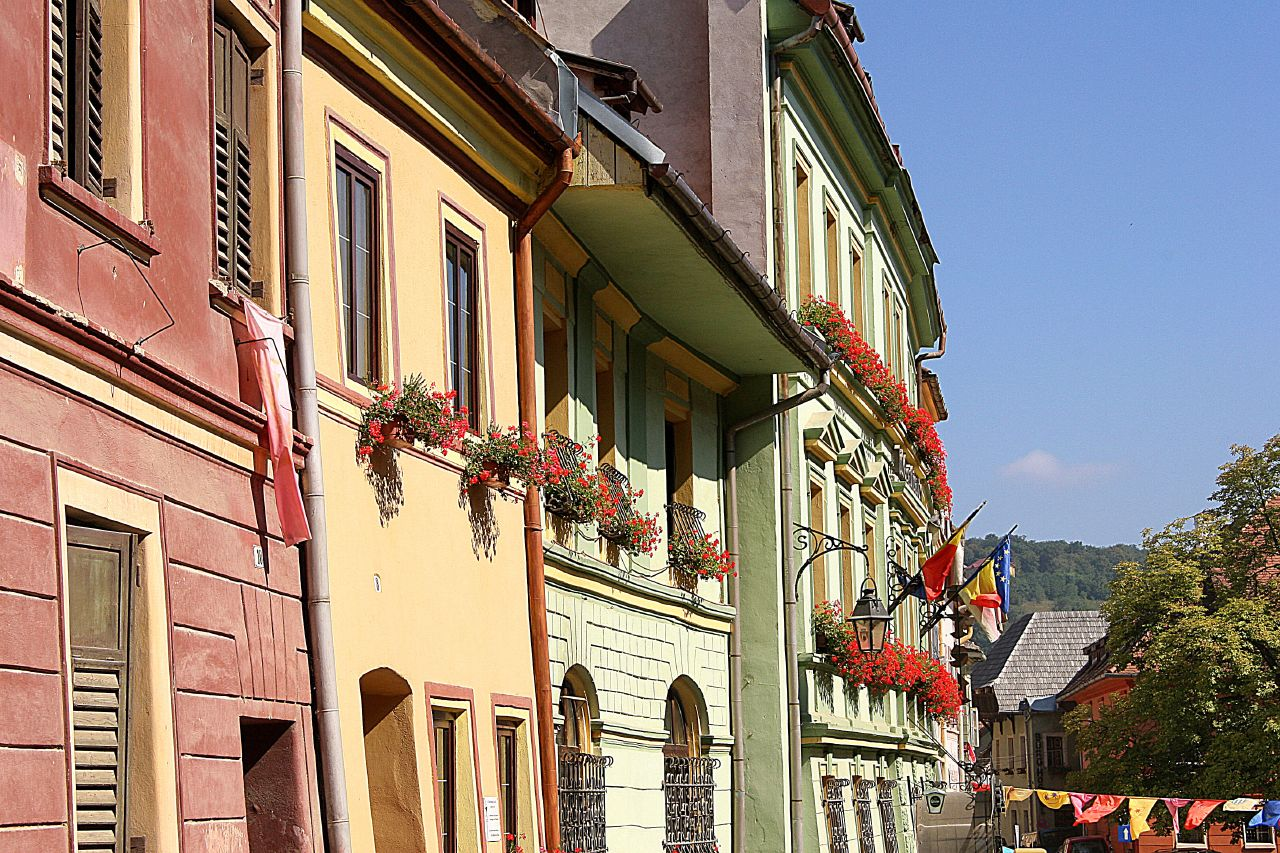
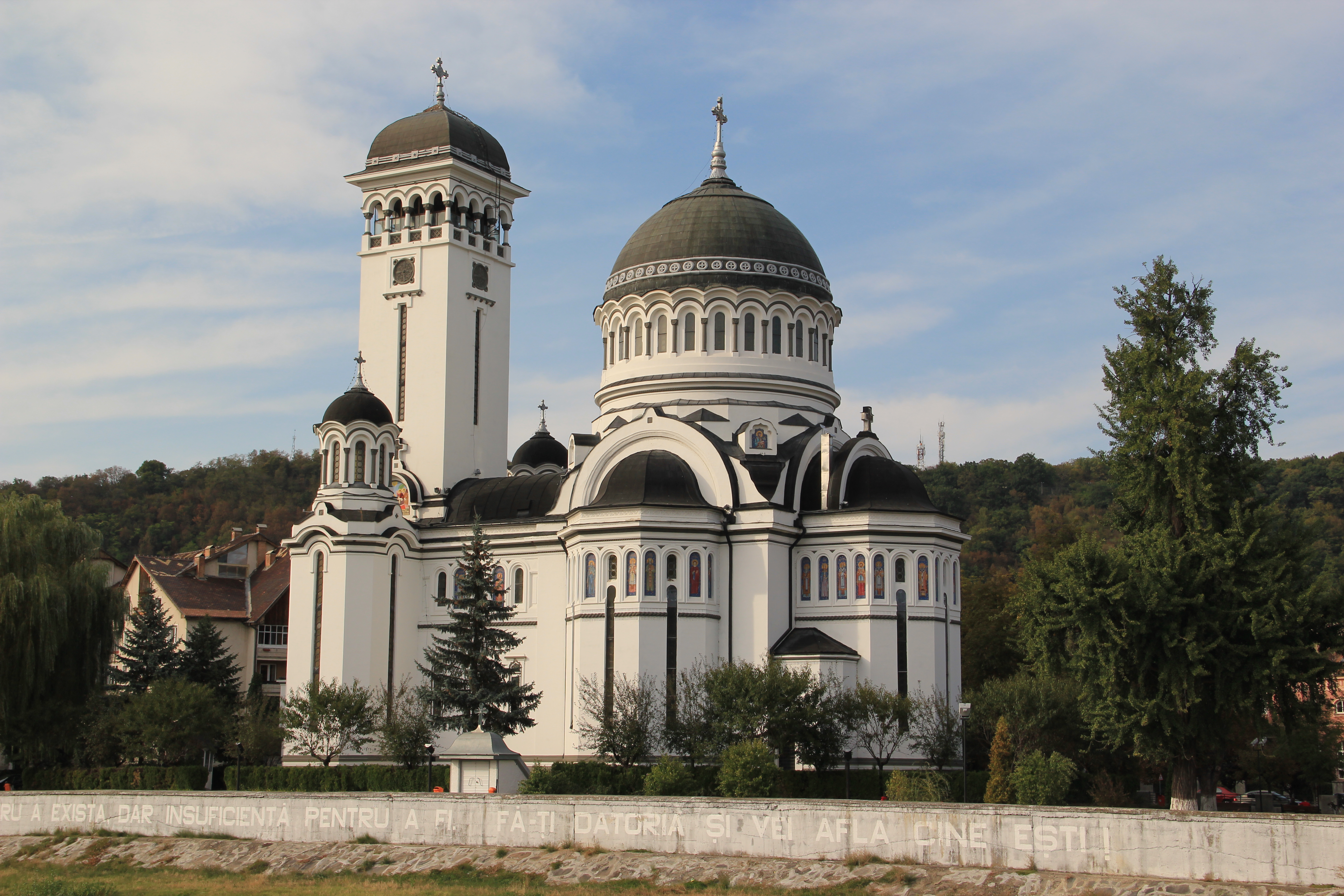
- Panorama Clock Tower City Centre Monastery Church Tinsmiths' Tower Church on the Hill Vlad Dracul House St. Joseph's Church City Hall Streets of Old Town Holy Trinity Church

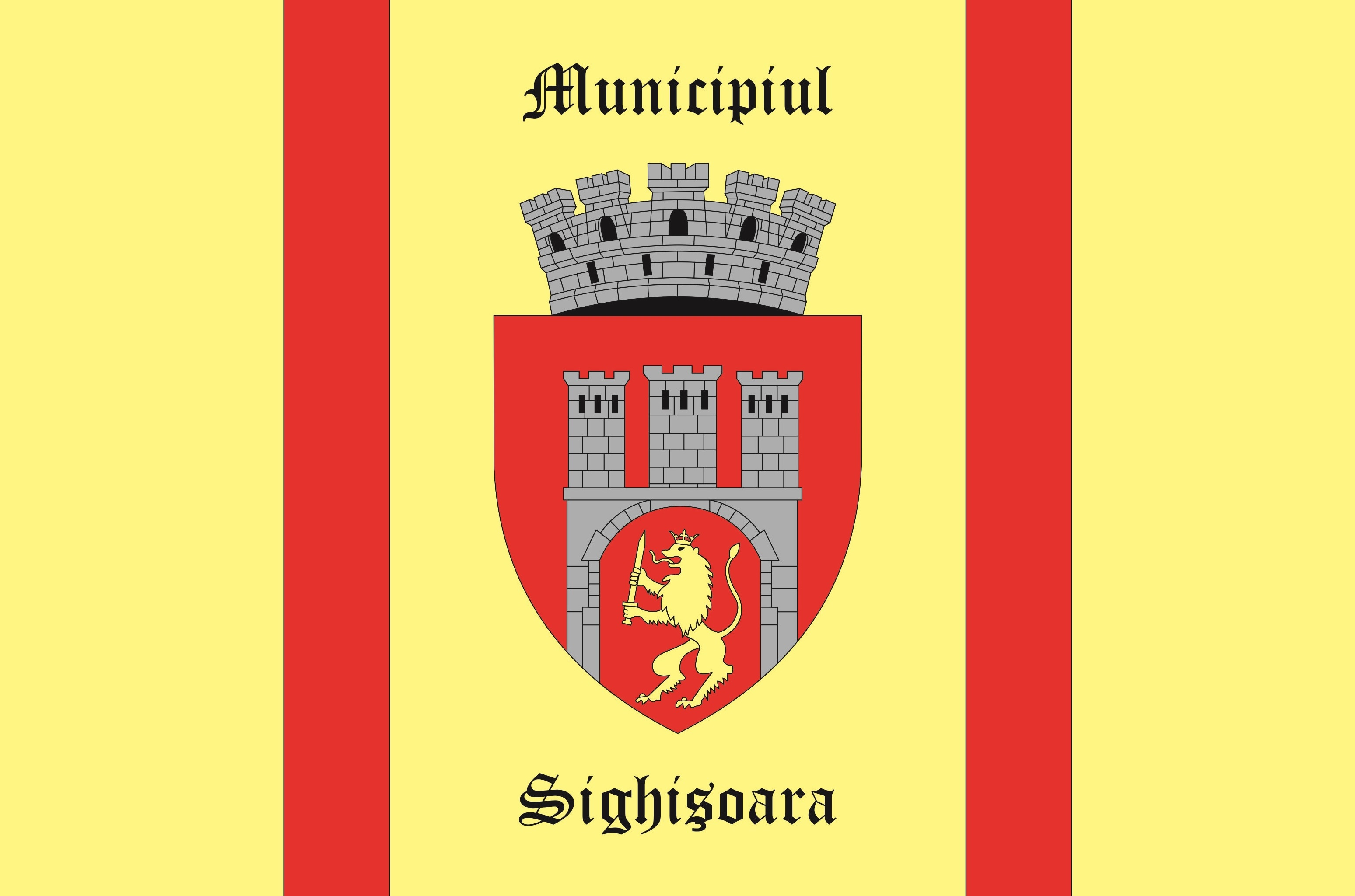
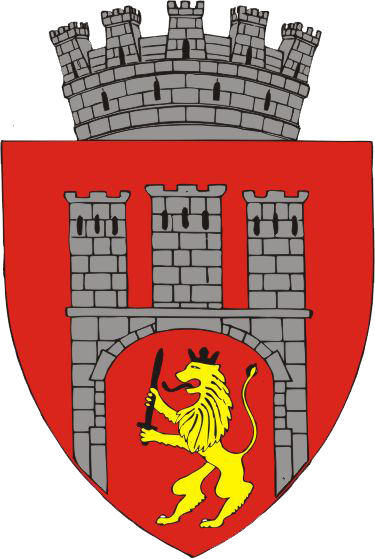
- Flag Coat of arms

- Location in Mureș County

- Location in Romania
- Coordinates: 46°13′1″N 24°47′28″E
- Country: Romania
- County: Mureș

Government
  - Mayor (2024–2028): Ioan-Iulian Sîrbu (FD)
- Area: 113.47 km^{2} (43.81 sq mi)
- Elevation: 380 m (1,250 ft)
- Population (2021-12-01): 23,927
  - Density: 210.87/km^{2} (546.14/sq mi)
- Time zone: UTC+02:00 (EET)
  - Summer (DST): UTC+03:00 (EEST)
- Postal code: 545400
- Area code: (+40) 0265
- Vehicle reg.: MS
- Website: primariasighisoara.ro

UNESCO World Heritage Site
- Official name: Historic Centre of Sighișoara
- Type: Cultural
- Criteria: iii, v
- Designated: 1999 (23rd session)
- Reference no.: 902
- Region: Europe

Sighișoara (Romanian pronunciation: [siɡiˈʃo̯ara]; Hungarian: Segesvár [ˈʃɛɡɛʃvaːr]; German: Schäßburg [ˈʃɛsbʊʁk]; Transylvanian Saxon: Schäsbrich, Šesburχ, or Scheeßprich; Yiddish: שעסבורג, romanized: Shesburg; Latin: Castrum Sex or Saxoburgum) is a city on the Târnava Mare River in Mureș County, central Romania. Located in the historic region of Transylvania, Sighișoara had a population of 23,927 according to the 2021 census. It is a popular tourist destination for its well-preserved old town, which is listed by UNESCO as a World Heritage Site since 1999. The town administers seven villages: Angofa, Aurel Vlaicu, Hetiur, Rora, Șoromiclea, Venchi, and Viilor.

== History ==
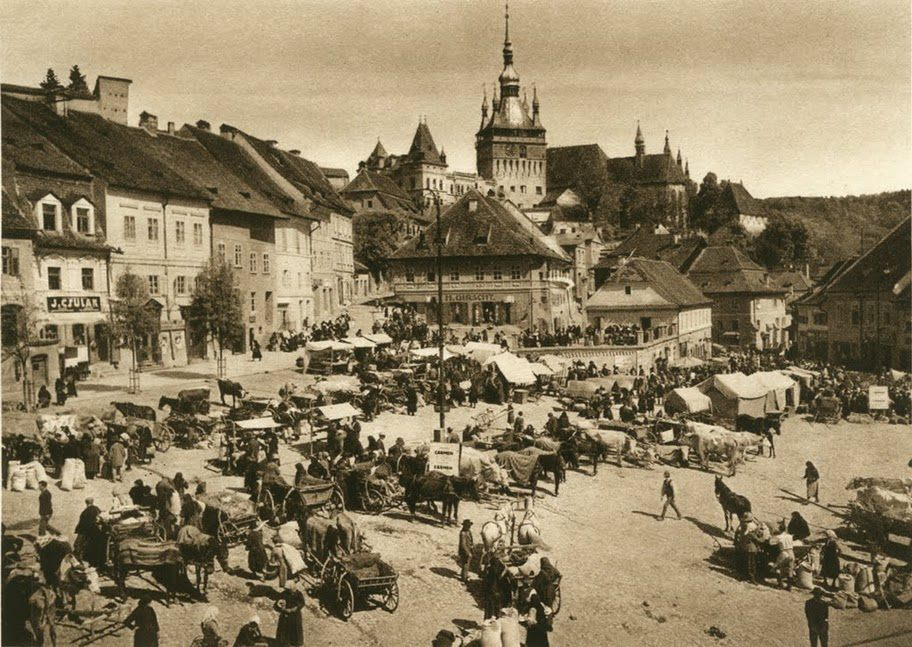
Central Sighișoara as photographed by Kurt Hielscher in 1933.

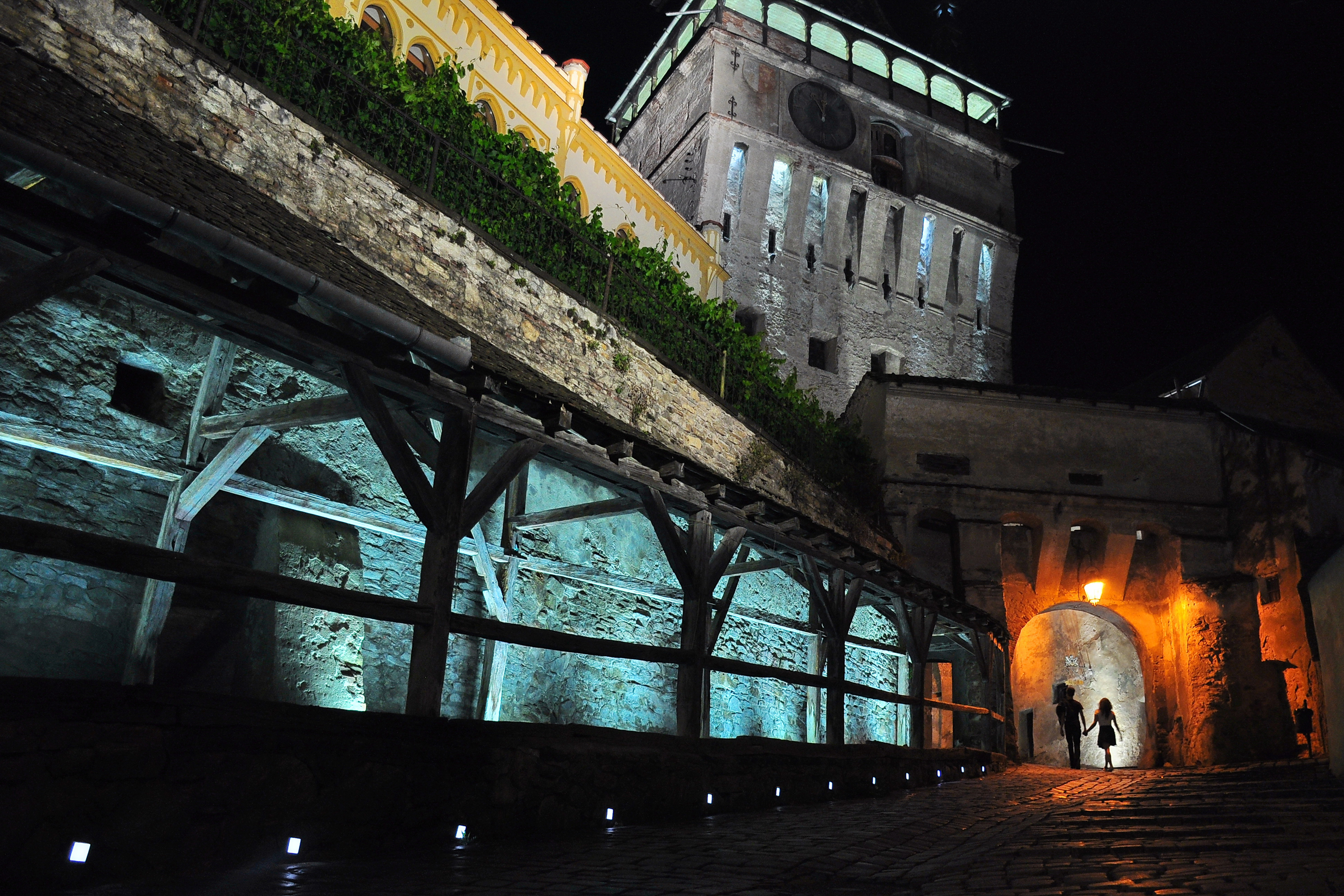
A street in central Sighișoara, very close to the Clock Tower.

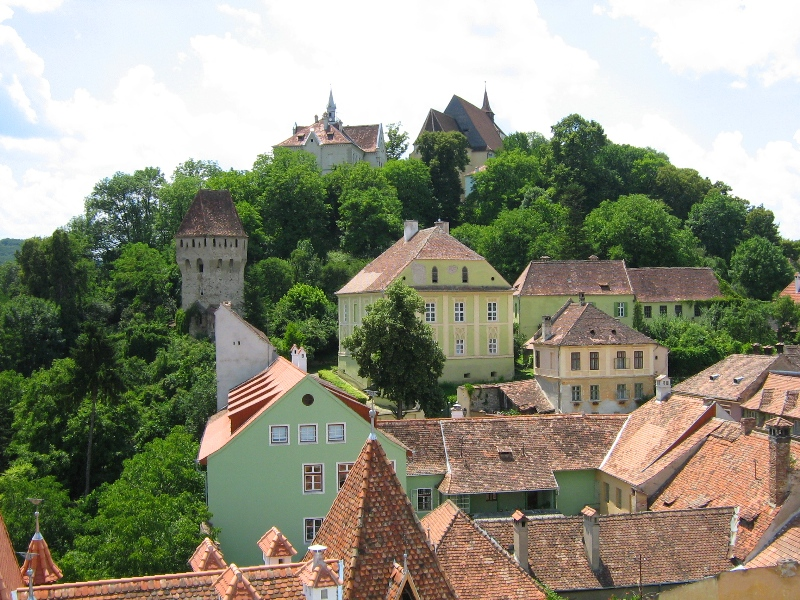
The town centre of Sighișoara, as seen from the Clock Tower during the summer.

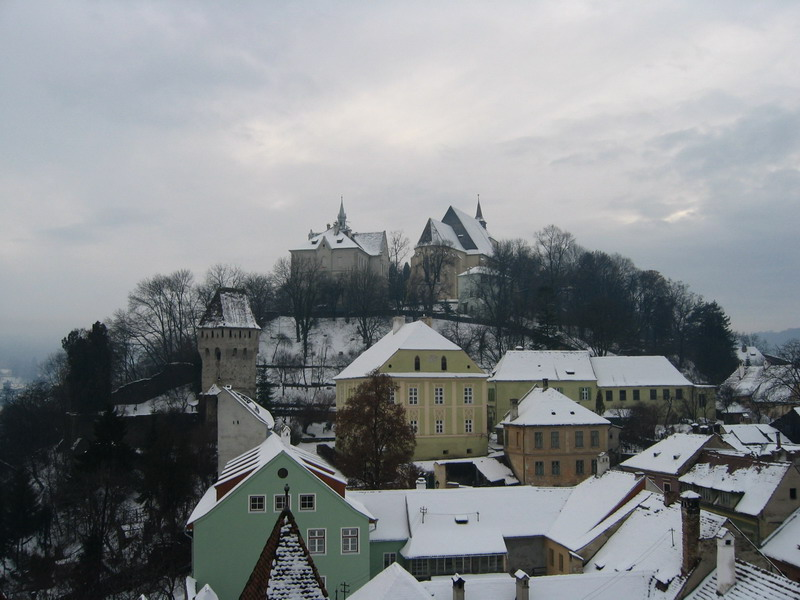
The town centre of Sighișoara, as seen from the Clock Tower in winter time.

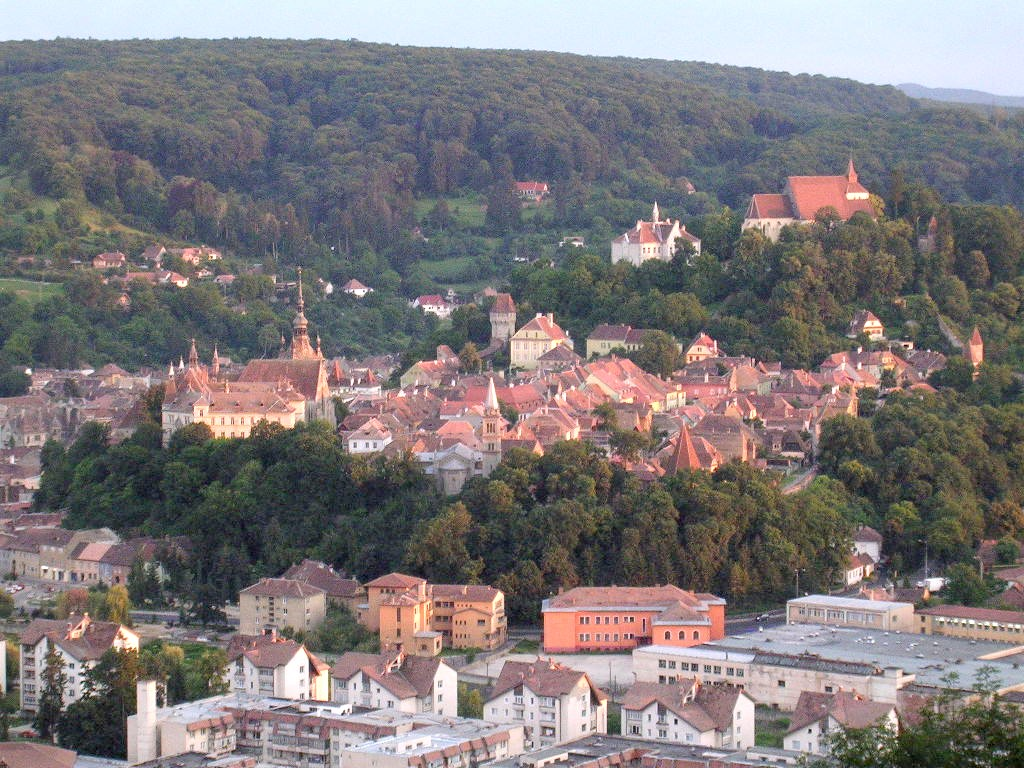
View from Villa Franka

Starting with the mid 12th century, German craftsmen and merchants known as the Transylvanian Saxons (German: Siebenbürger Sachsen) were invited to Transylvania by the then King of Hungary, Géza II, to settle and defend the frontier of his realm and improve the region's economy. The chronicler Krauss lists a Saxon settlement in present-day Sighișoara by 1191. A document of 1280 records a town built on the site of a Roman fort as Castrum Sex or "six-sided camp", referring to the fort's shape of an irregular hexagon. Other names recorded include Schaäsburg (1282), Schespurg (1298) and Segusvar (1300). By 1337 Sighișoara had become a royal center for the kings, who awarded the settlement urban status in 1367 as the Civitas de Segusvar.

The town played an important strategic and commercial role at the edges of Central Europe for several centuries. Sighișoara became one of the most important urban centres of Transylvania, with artisans from throughout the Holy Roman Empire visiting the settlement. The German artisans and craftsmen dominated the urban economy, as well as building the fortifications protecting it. It is estimated that during the 16th and 17th centuries Sighișoara had as many as 15 guilds and 20 handicraft branches. The Baroque sculptor Elias Nicolai lived in the town. The Wallachian voivode Vlad Dracul (father of Vlad the Impaler), who lived in exile in the town, had coins minted in the town (otherwise coinage was the monopoly of the Hungarian kings in the Kingdom of Hungary) and issued the first document listing the city's Romanian name, Sighișoara. The Romanian name is first attested in 1435, and derives from the Hungarian Segesvár, where vár is "fort".

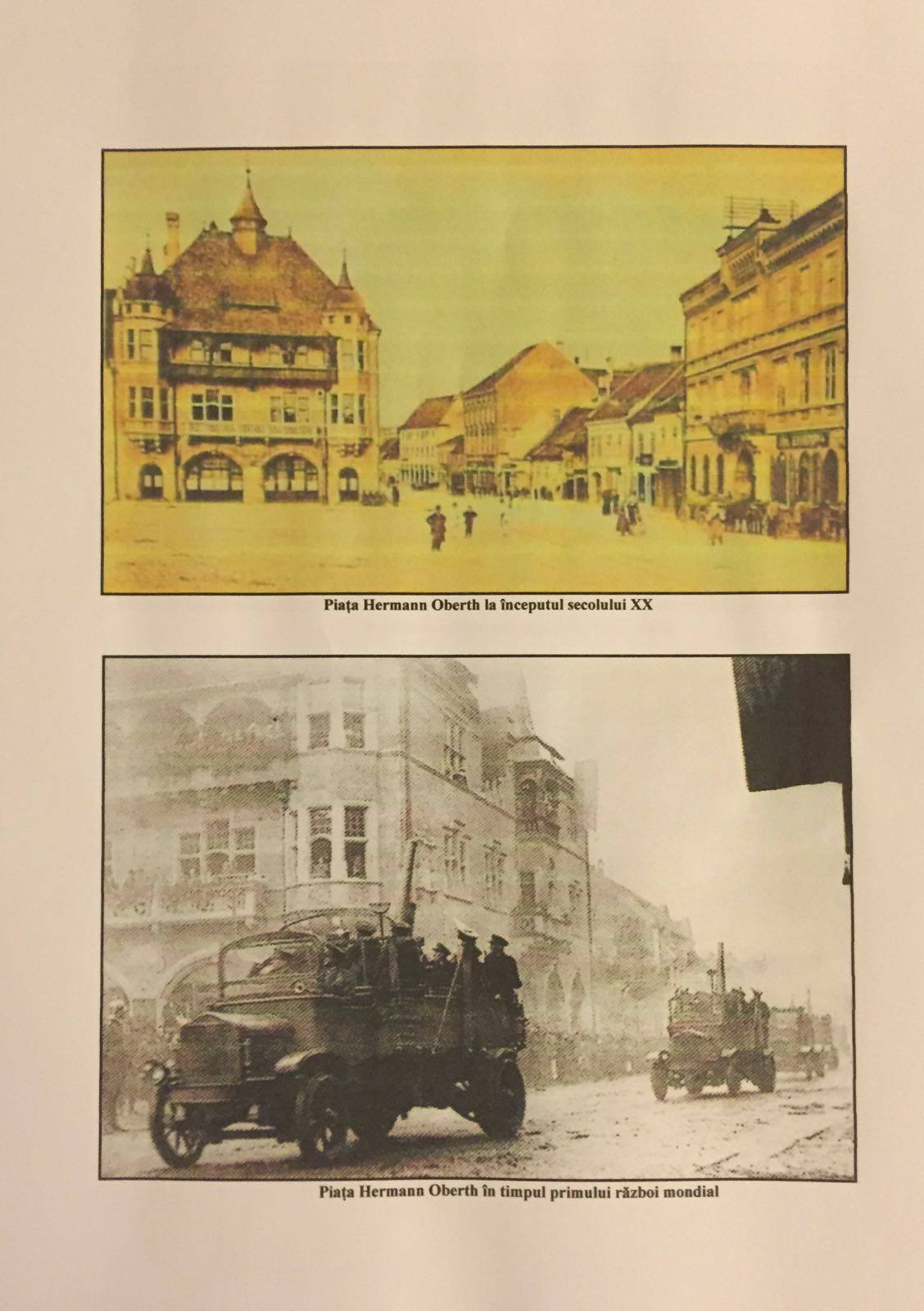
Hermann Oberth Square during the 20th century

The town was the setting for George I Rákóczi's election as Prince of Transylvania and King of Hungary in 1631. Sighișoara suffered military occupation, fires, and plagues during the 17th and 18th centuries. An important source for the history of 17th-century Transylvania, for the period of 1606–1666, are the records of Georg Kraus, the town's notary.

The nearby plain of Albești was the site of the Battle of Segesvár, where the revolutionary Hungarian army led by Józef Bem was defeated by the Russian army led by Lüders on 31 July 1849. A monument was constructed in 1852 to the Russian general Skariatin, who died in the battle. The Hungarian poet Sándor Petőfi is generally believed to have been killed in the battle, and a monument was constructed in his honor at Albești in 1897. After World War I Sighișoara passed with Transylvania from Austria-Hungary to the Kingdom of Romania.

Central Sighișoara has preserved in an exemplary way the features of a small medieval fortified town. It has been listed by UNESCO as a World Heritage Site. Each year, a medieval Festival takes place in the old citadel in July.

In Eastern Europe and Southeastern Europe, Sighișoara is one of the few fortified towns that are still inhabited. The town is made up of two parts. The medieval stronghold was built on top of a hill and is known as the Citadel (Cetatea). The lower town lies in the valley of Târnava Mare river.

The houses inside Sighișoara Citadel show the main features of a craftsmen's town. However, there are some houses that belonged to the former patriciate, like the Venetian House and the House with Antlers.

Between 2001 and 2003, the construction of a Dracula theme park in the Braite nature preserve near Sighișoara was considered but ultimately rejected, owing to the strong opposition of local civil society groups and national and international media as well as politically influential persons, as the theme park would have detracted from the medieval style of the city and would have destroyed the nature preserve.

== Geography ==
Sighișoara is located in the south-eastern part of Mureș County, in central Romania, within the Transylvanian Depression and the Târnava Plateau. The municipality extends along both banks of the Târnava Mare River, occupying the Târnava Mare valley corridor. Most of the built-up area, including the medieval citadel, is situated on terraces predominantly on the left bank of the river.

North of the Târnava Mare River lie the Jacod Hills (Dealurile Jacodului), while to the south is the Vânători Plateau (Podișul Vânătorilor), a subdivision of the Hârtibaciu Plateau, with elevations generally ranging between 550 and 600 m. The municipal territory is characterized by elevated hills descending towards the river floodplain, alongside a relatively level plateau in its eastern part. The highest elevation within the municipality is 698 m, at Dealul Icoanei, near the village of Aurel Vlaicu, while the highest point within the built-up area reaches 560 m at Dealul Bisericii.

The Târnava Mare is the principal watercourse crossing the municipality. It has a meandering course and a relatively gentle gradient, below 1.5‰. Several tributaries flow into the river within the municipal territory, the most significant being the Șaeș stream, which marks part of the municipality's western boundary. Other elements of the local hydrographic network include the Șercheș and Rusu lakes.

=== Climate ===
Sighișoara has a warm-summer humid continental climate (Köppen: Dfb), characteristic of the Transylvanian Plateau. The surrounding hilly terrain and the lower-lying Târnava Mare valley influence local temperatures and precipitation, contributing to temperature inversions, frequent fog and air currents along the valley. The average annual temperature is approximately 10 °C, while average annual precipitation is estimated at 650-700 mm.

The highest temperature to have ever been recorded in Sighișoara is 38.8 °C (101.8 °F) on 25 August 2012, while the lowest is −33.3 °C (−27.9 °F), measured on 23 January 1963.

Climate data for Sighișoara (elevation 380 m, 2001–2025 normals, extremes 2001–present)
Month	Jan	Feb	Mar	Apr	May	Jun	Jul	Aug	Sep	Oct	Nov	Dec	Year
Record high °C (°F)	17.5 (63.5)	20.6 (69.1)	27.5 (81.5)	30.9 (87.6)	32.2 (90.0)	34.5 (94.1)	38.0 (100.4)	38.8 (101.8)	35.0 (95.0)	31.1 (88.0)	26.7 (80.1)	15.7 (60.3)	38.8 (101.8)
Mean daily maximum °C (°F)	2.8 (37.0)	6.0 (42.8)	11.6 (52.9)	17.3 (63.1)	22.2 (72.0)	25.9 (78.6)	28.0 (82.4)	28.2 (82.8)	22.9 (73.2)	17.2 (63.0)	10.5 (50.9)	3.7 (38.7)	16.4 (61.5)
Daily mean °C (°F)	−1.6 (29.1)	0.9 (33.6)	5.4 (41.7)	10.4 (50.7)	15.4 (59.7)	19.2 (66.6)	21.0 (69.8)	20.7 (69.3)	16.0 (60.8)	10.5 (50.9)	5.3 (41.5)	0.0 (32.0)	10.3 (50.5)
Mean daily minimum °C (°F)	−5.9 (21.4)	−4.3 (24.3)	−0.9 (30.4)	3.5 (38.3)	8.6 (47.5)	12.4 (54.3)	13.9 (57.0)	13.2 (55.8)	9.0 (48.2)	3.9 (39.0)	0.2 (32.4)	−3.7 (25.3)	4.2 (39.5)
Record low °C (°F)	−26.5 (−15.7)	−28.3 (−18.9)	−21.9 (−7.4)	−6.1 (21.0)	−3.7 (25.3)	3.8 (38.8)	6.7 (44.1)	3.7 (38.7)	−2.8 (27.0)	−8.6 (16.5)	−13.1 (8.4)	−24.9 (−12.8)	−28.3 (−18.9)
Average precipitation mm (inches)	29 (1.1)	27 (1.1)	39 (1.5)	52 (2.0)	78 (3.1)	93 (3.7)	78 (3.1)	67 (2.6)	56 (2.2)	45 (1.8)	39 (1.5)	31 (1.2)	634 (24.9)
Average precipitation days (≥ 1.0 mm)	8	7	9	9	12	12	12	8	8	7	8	7	107
Source: National Administration of Meteorology (MeteoRomania), CC-BY-SA-4.0

== Demographics and name ==
Historical population
Year	Pop.	±%
1910	10,913	—
1930	13,033	+19.4%
1948	18,284	+40.3%
1956	20,363	+11.4%
1966	25,109	+23.3%
1977	33,208	+32.3%
1992	36,170	+8.9%
2002	32,287	−10.7%
2011	28,102	−13.0%
2021	23,927	−14.9%
Source: Official Romanian census data

At the 2011 census, the city had a population of 28,102, of which 75% were Romanians, 17.6% Hungarians, 5.3% Roma, and 1.5% Germans (more specifically Transylvanian Saxons). At the 2021 census, Sighișoara had a population of 23,927; of those, 65.69% were Romanians, 12.57% Hungarians, and 2.93% Roma.

In Romanian	In German	In Hungarian
Sighișoara	Schäßburg	Segesvár
Angofa	Ungefug	Angofa
Aurel Vlaicu	—N/a	Haufan
Hetiur	Marienburg bei Schäßburg	Hétúr
Rora	Rohrau	Róra
Șoromiclea	—N/a	—N/a
Venchi	Wench	Venk
Viilor	Kulturberg	Szőlőskert

== Sights ==
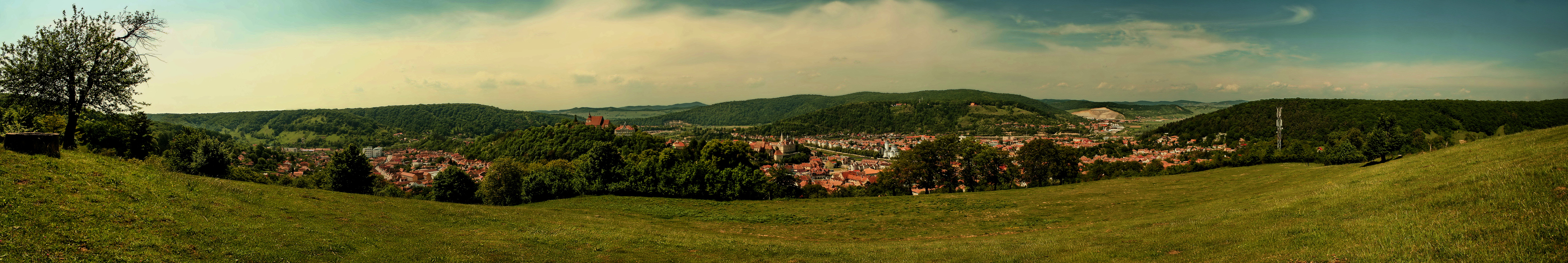
View of Sighișoara from Lunca Poștei

Sighișoara is a popular tourist destination for its well-preserved walled old town, which is also listed by UNESCO as a World Heritage Site. The main Citadel's attractions are certainly the towers. The city is also an attraction on the Via Transilvanica long-distance trail.

=== Towers ===
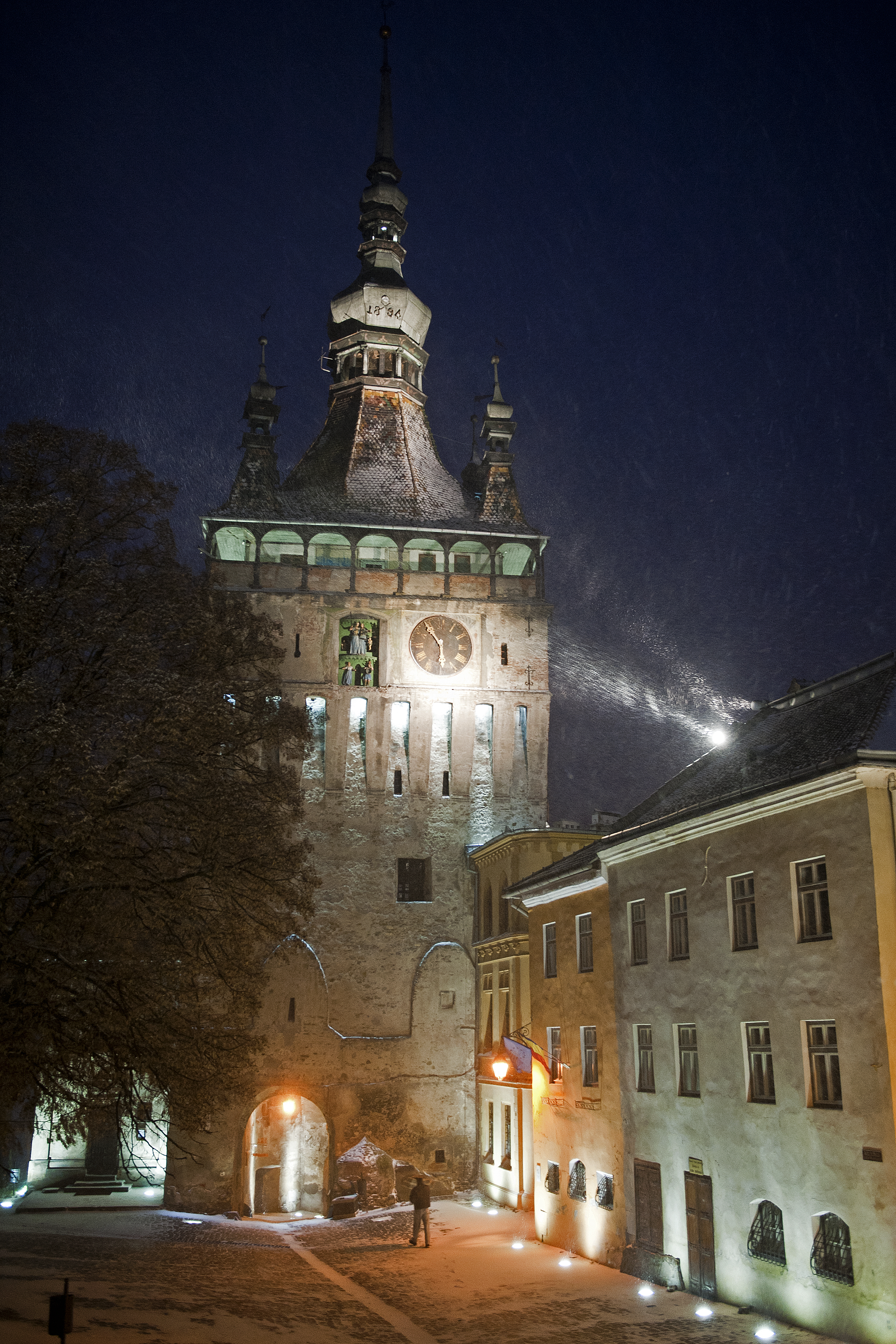
The Clock Tower (German: Der Stundturm, Romanian: Turnul cu ceas), as seen by night.

According to ancient military architectural writings, the defence towers had to be a fortification system for the mutual defense, and, at the same time, each tower was supposed to be an independent fortress: a break at the base of a tower did not mean entering into the city, capturing a tower did not have to lead to the conquest of the city. Most of these towers were hollow and equipped with elevators and underground galleries.

- Sighișoara Clock Tower (Turnul cu Ceas) – the landmark of the city is a 64 m-high tower built in the 13th century. Today it is a museum of history.
- The Tinsmiths' Tower (Turnul Cositorarilor)
- The Butchers' Tower (Turnul Măcelarilor)
- The Bootmakers' Tower
- The Tailors' Tower (Turnul Croitorilor)
- The Furriers' Tower (Turnul Cojocarilor)
- The Ironsmiths' Tower (Turnul Fierarilor)
- The Ropemakers' Tower (Turnul Frânghierilor)
- The Tanners' Tower (Turnul Tăbăcarilor)
- The Face Tower – tower on the route to Târgu Mureș, out of the citadel, but still worth visiting thanks to its story.

=== Churches ===
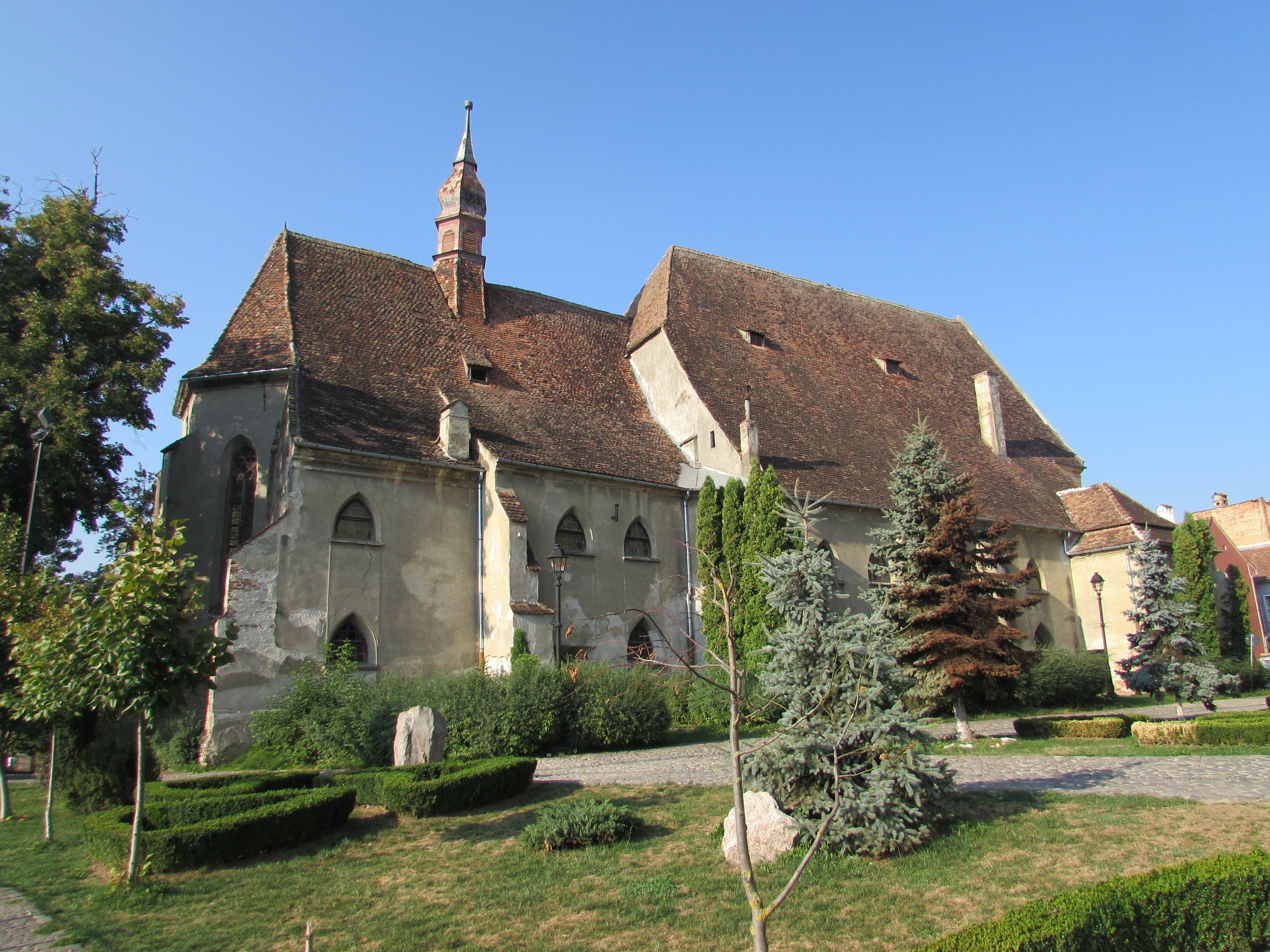
The Monastery Church in the town centre

- The church on the hill (Biserica din Deal) – is undoubtedly one of the most valuable architectural monuments of the city and has been one of the best buildings representing the gothic style in Romania.
- The Monastery Church (Biserica Mânăstirii Dominicane) – is a gothic style architectural monument which is in the neighbourhood of the Clock tower, which was built at the beginning of the 13th century. It is the only church without a bell: the reason is that the Saxons thought that one bell, that of the Church on the hill, was enough for the whole city.
- The Saint Joseph Roman Catholic church
- Leprosy Church (Biserica Leproșilor)
- The Orthodox Cathedral of Sighișoara (Catedrala Ortodoxă)
- The old Orthodox church

=== Civil architecture ===
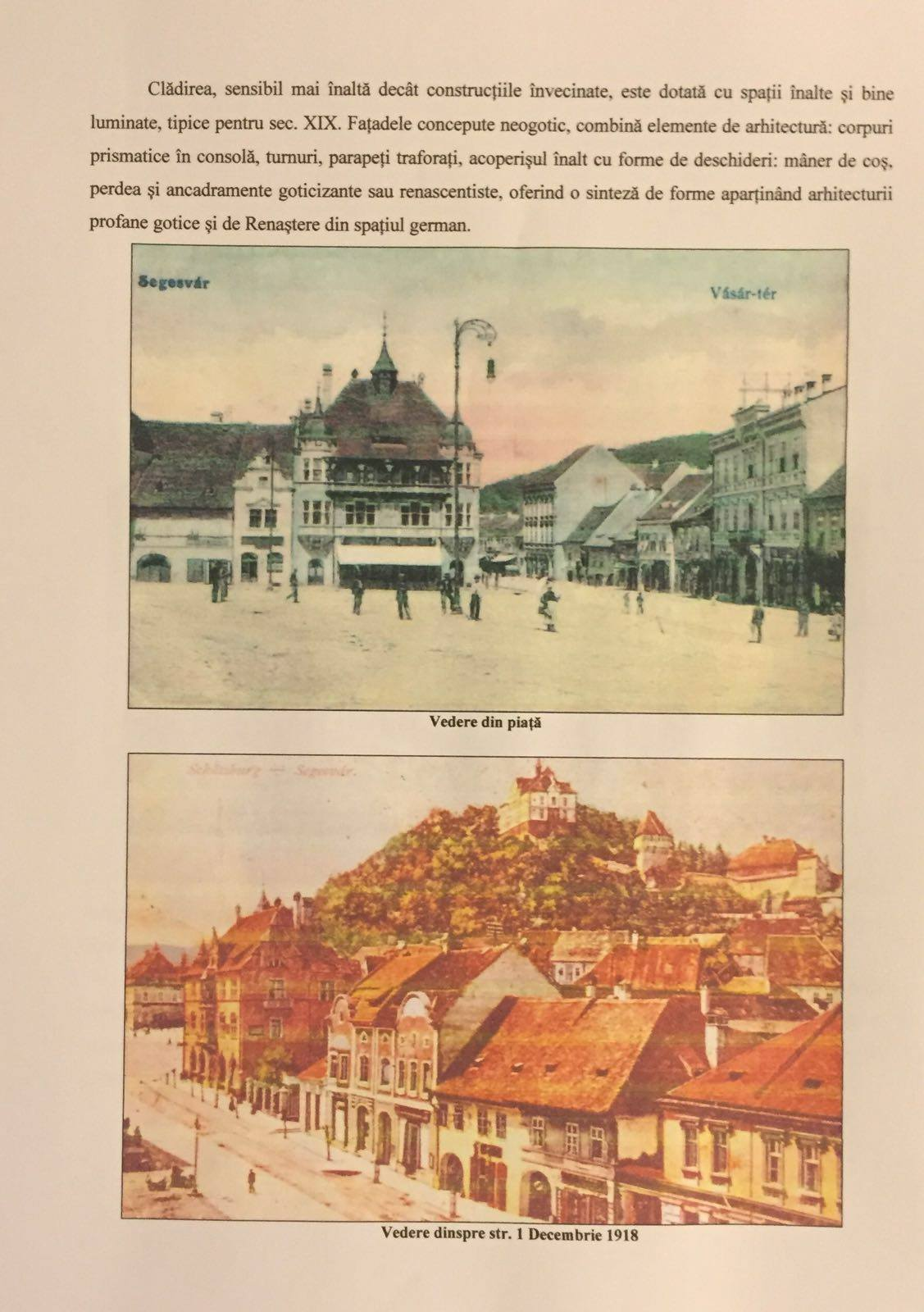
1 Decembrie 1918 street as seen during the 20th century.

Most of the 164 houses in the town at least 300 years old are considered historical monuments, as follows: those in the Town Square (or Citadel Square), with its rectangular plan, was once inhabited by noble families of the town, though it has undergone too many transformations over time. The best houses are the ones that have kept their original shape.

- House on the Rock (Casa de pe stâncă)
- House with shingles (Evert) – is dedicated to craftsmen for Educational Interethnic Centre for Youth.
- Venetian House or Green House (Casa Venețiană)
- Vlad Dracul's House
- Sighișoara City Hall
- Sighișoara hotel complex – built between 1886 and 1889 was the seat of city hall.
- Indoor wooden staircase or the Scholar's Stairs
- School on the Hill
- The Stag House (Casa cu Cerb)
- The Citadel Square (Piața Cetăți)
- Guilders' Association House (La Perla)
- Josef B. Teutsch House (Hotel Central Park)

== Natives ==
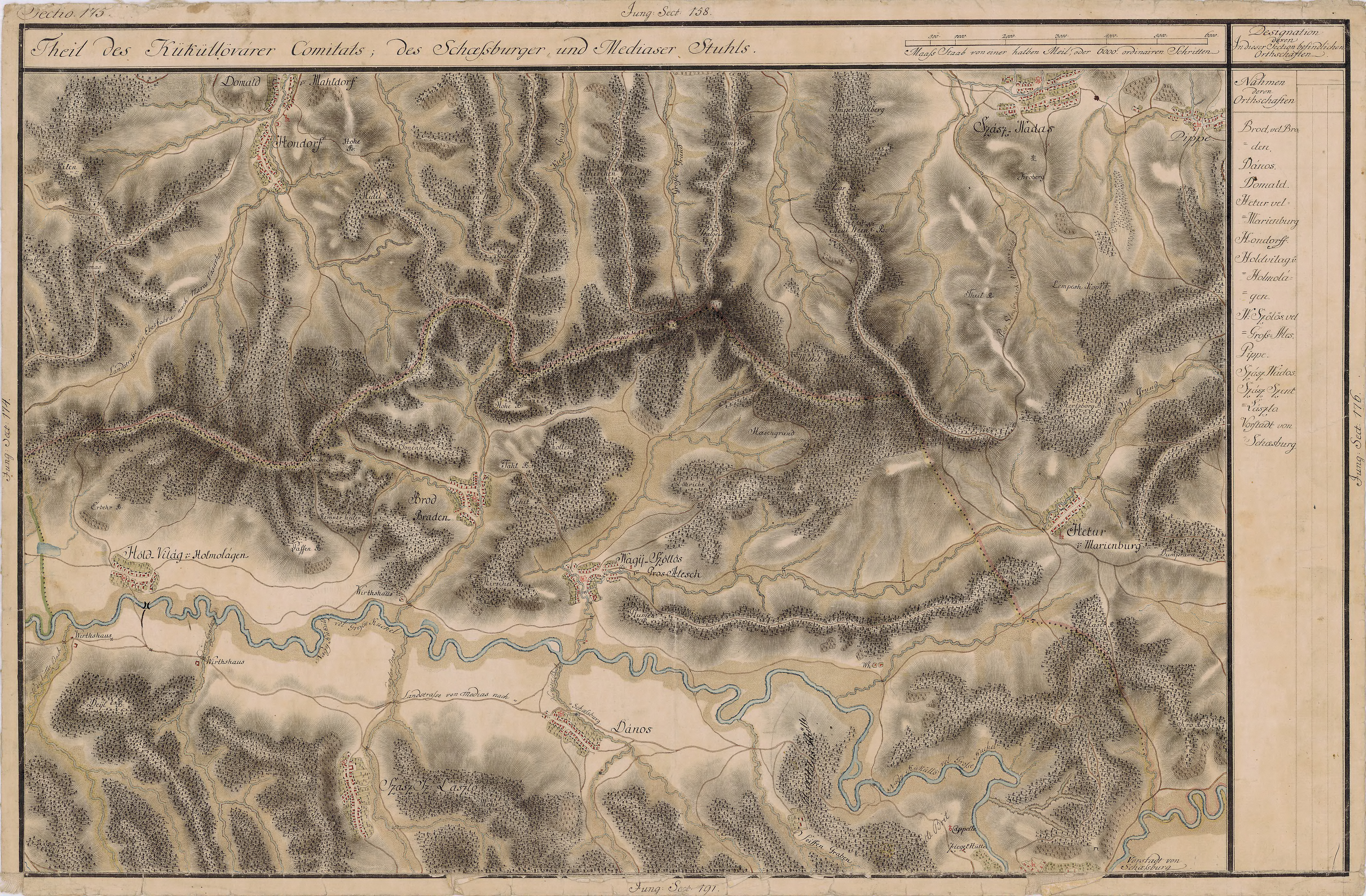
Sighișoara in the Grand Duchy of Transylvania, 1769–1773. Josephinische Landesaufnahme

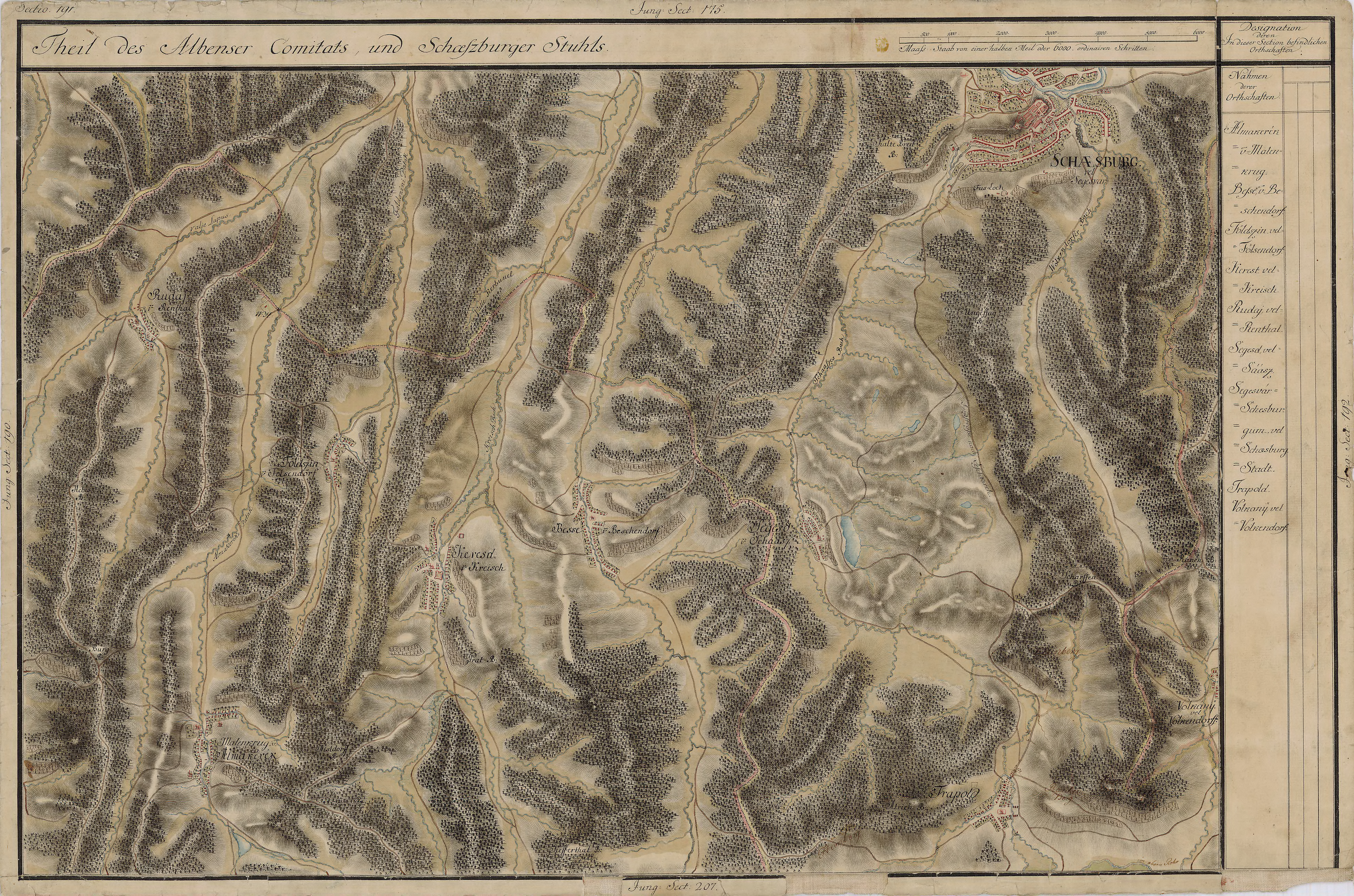
Sighișoara in the Grand Duchy of Transylvania, 1769–1773. Josephinische Landesaufnahme

- Johann Michael Ackner, Transylvanian Saxon archaeologist
- Doina Cojocaru, handball player
- Friedrich Grünanger, architect
- Ralph Gunesch, former professional German football player
- Adrian Ivanițchi, folk guitarist
- Johannes Kelpius, a German intellectual, musician, and mystic who founded a religious community when he immigrated to the American colony of Pennsylvania in the late seventeenth century
- Gabriel Mureșan, footballer
- Marie Stritt, German feminist and suffragist
- Georg Daniel Teutsch, Lutheran bishop
- Vlad III the Impaler, prince of Wallachia, inspiration for fictional vampire Count Dracula
- Radu Voina, former handball player, currently coach

== International relations ==
=== Twin towns – sister cities ===
Sighișoara is twinned with:

Dinkelsbühl, Germany; Kiskunfélegyháza, Hungary; Baden, Switzerland; Blois, France	Città di Castello, Italy; Zamość, Poland; Lublin, Poland

== Gallery ==
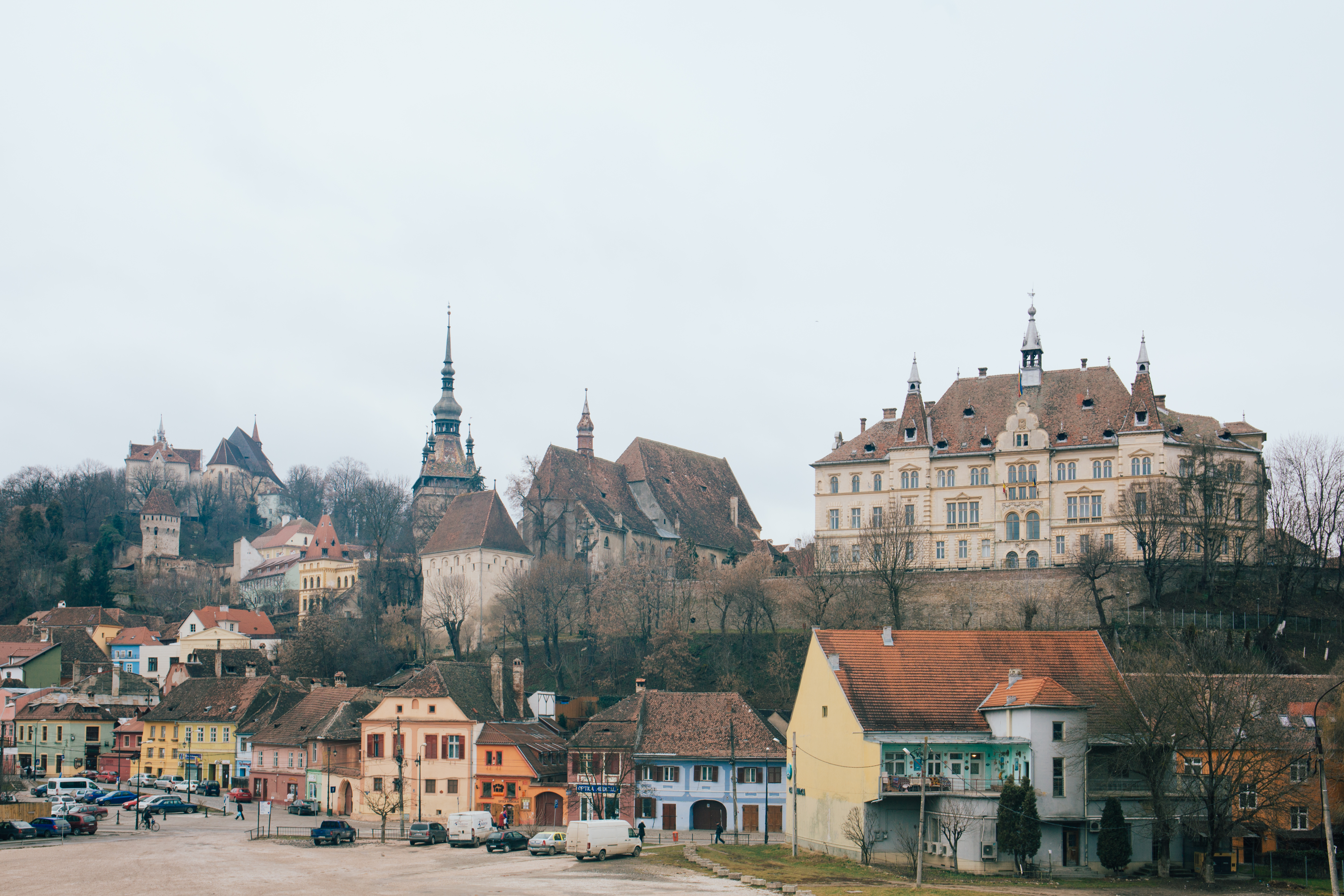
Downtown Sighișoara

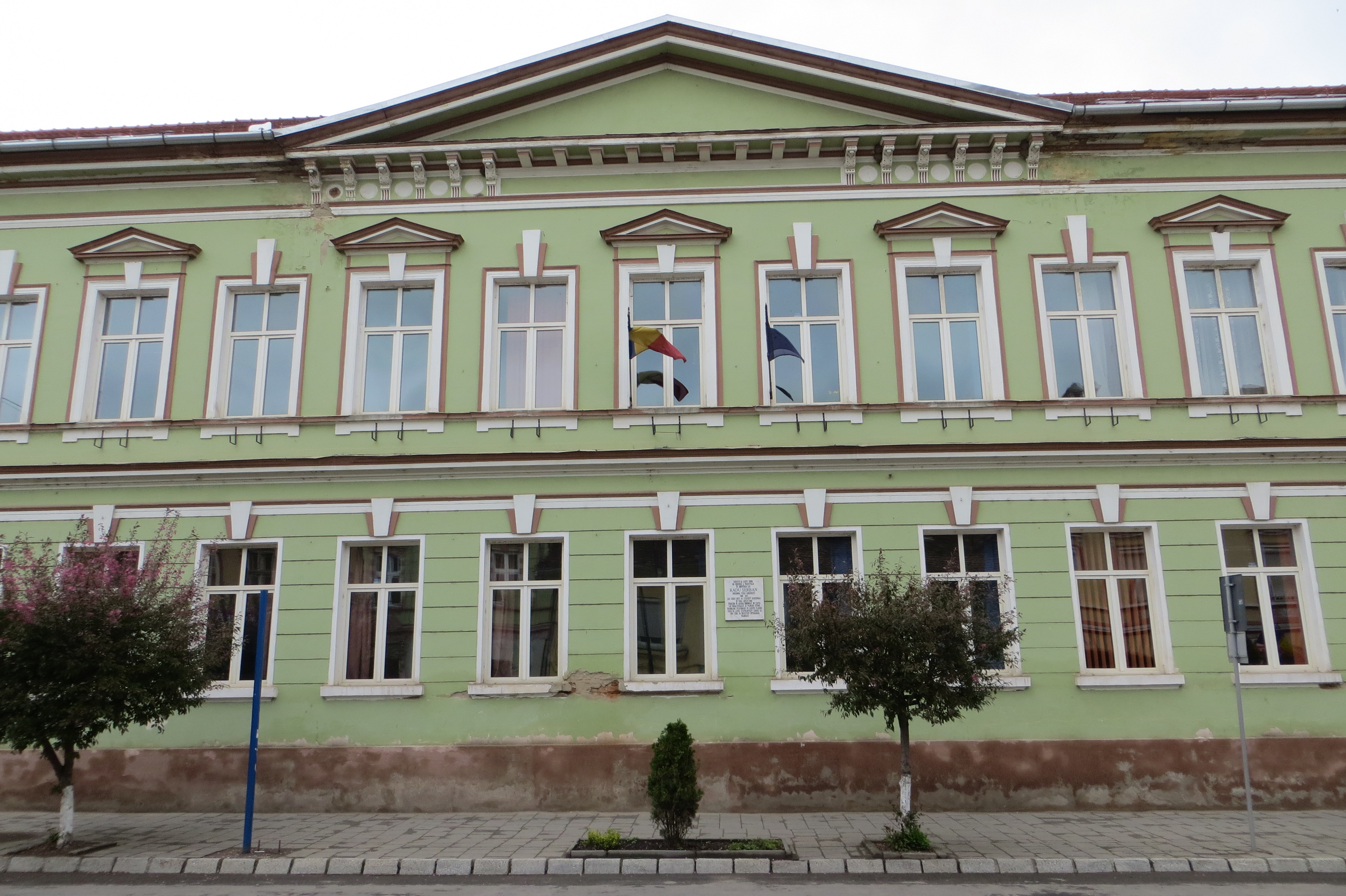
Mircea Eliade National College

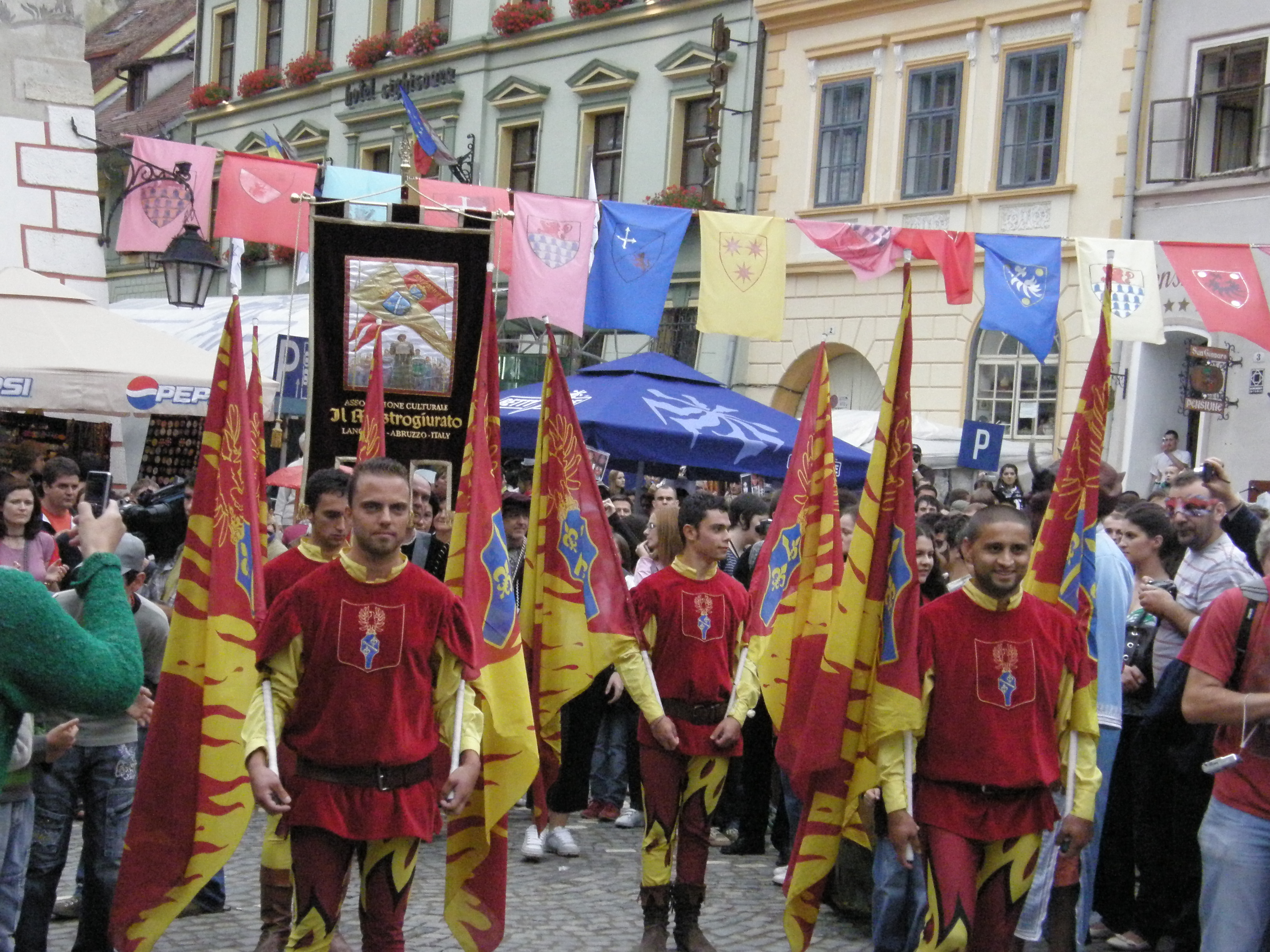
Sighișoara medieval festival

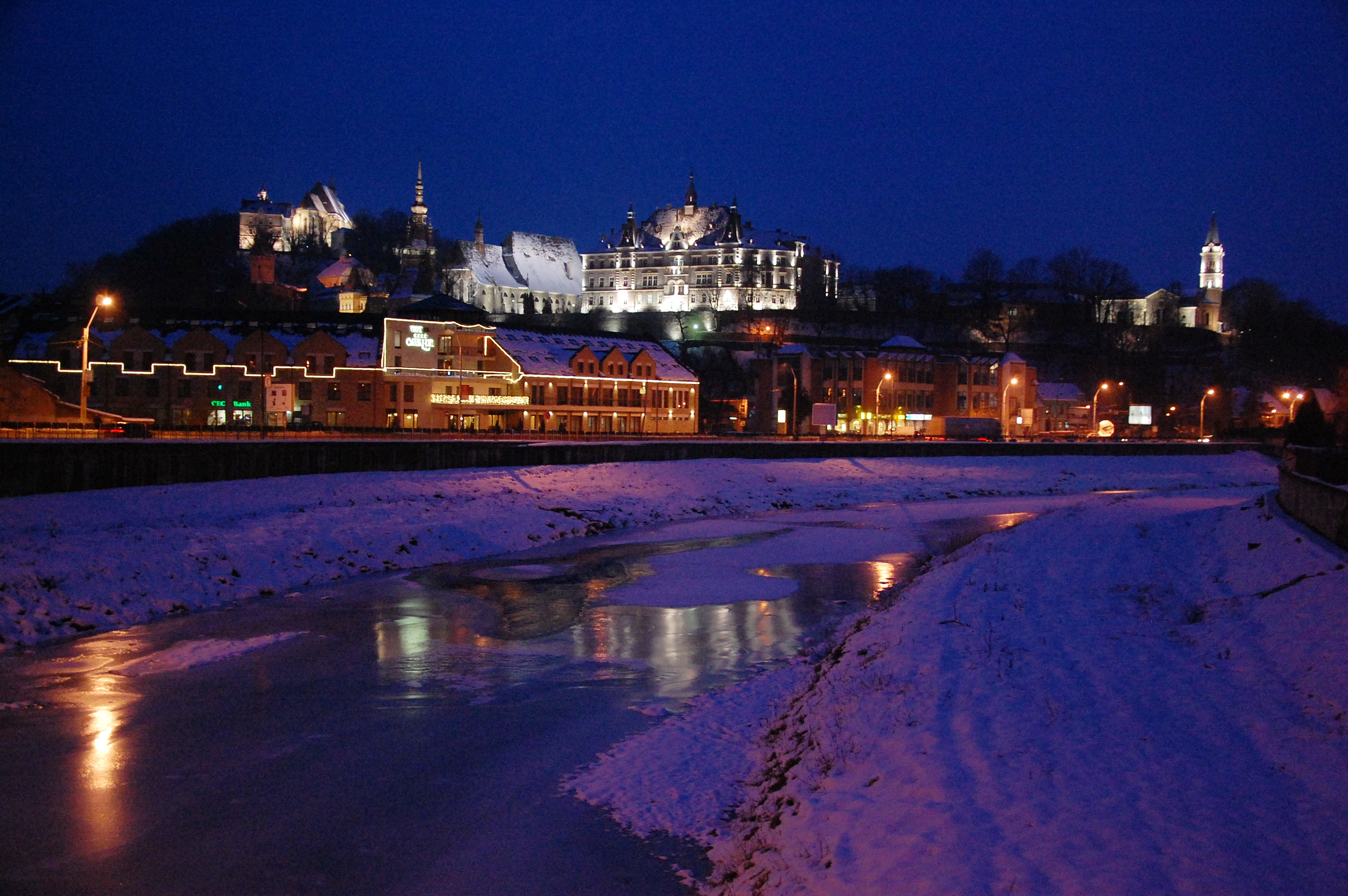
Downtown Sighișoara by night in winter

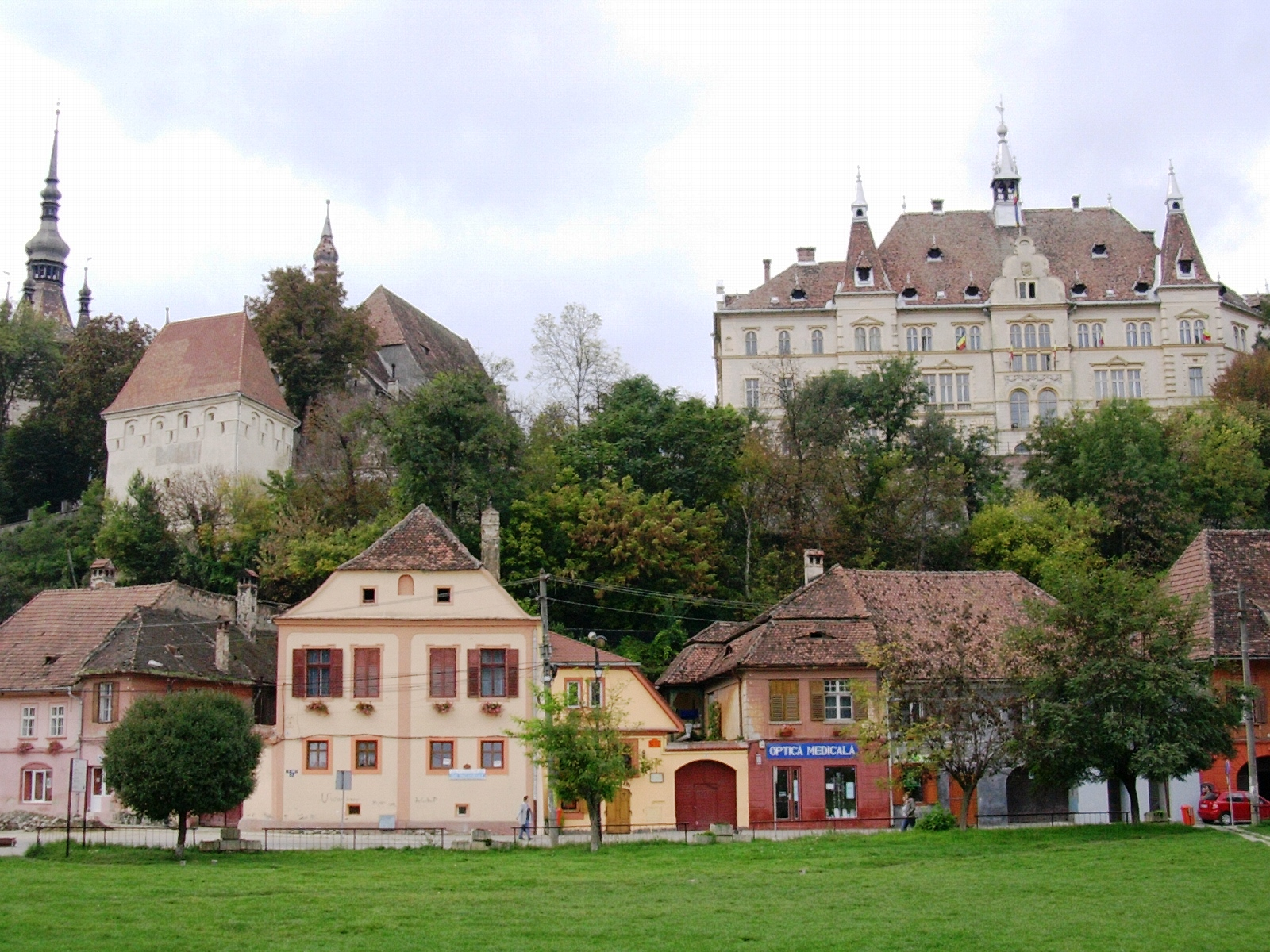
Downtown Sighișoara by day

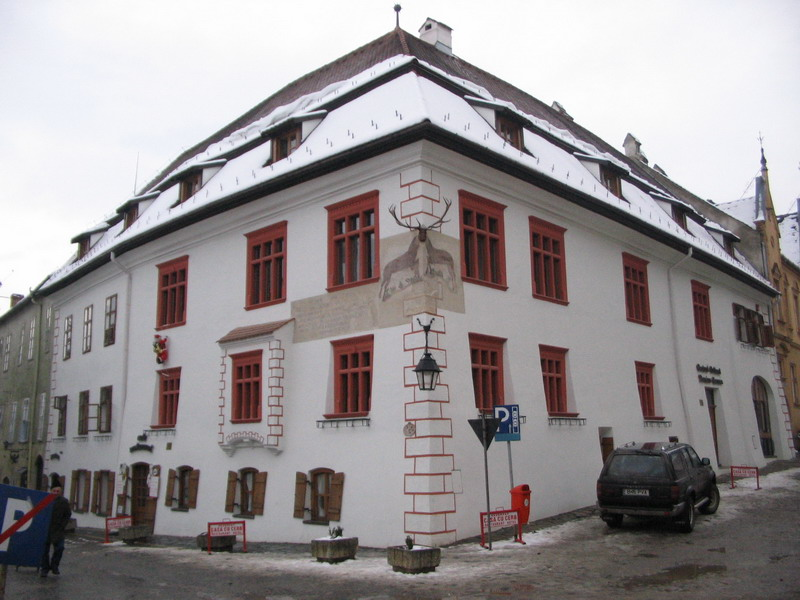
The Stag House (Romanian: Casa cu Cerb) in Sighișoara

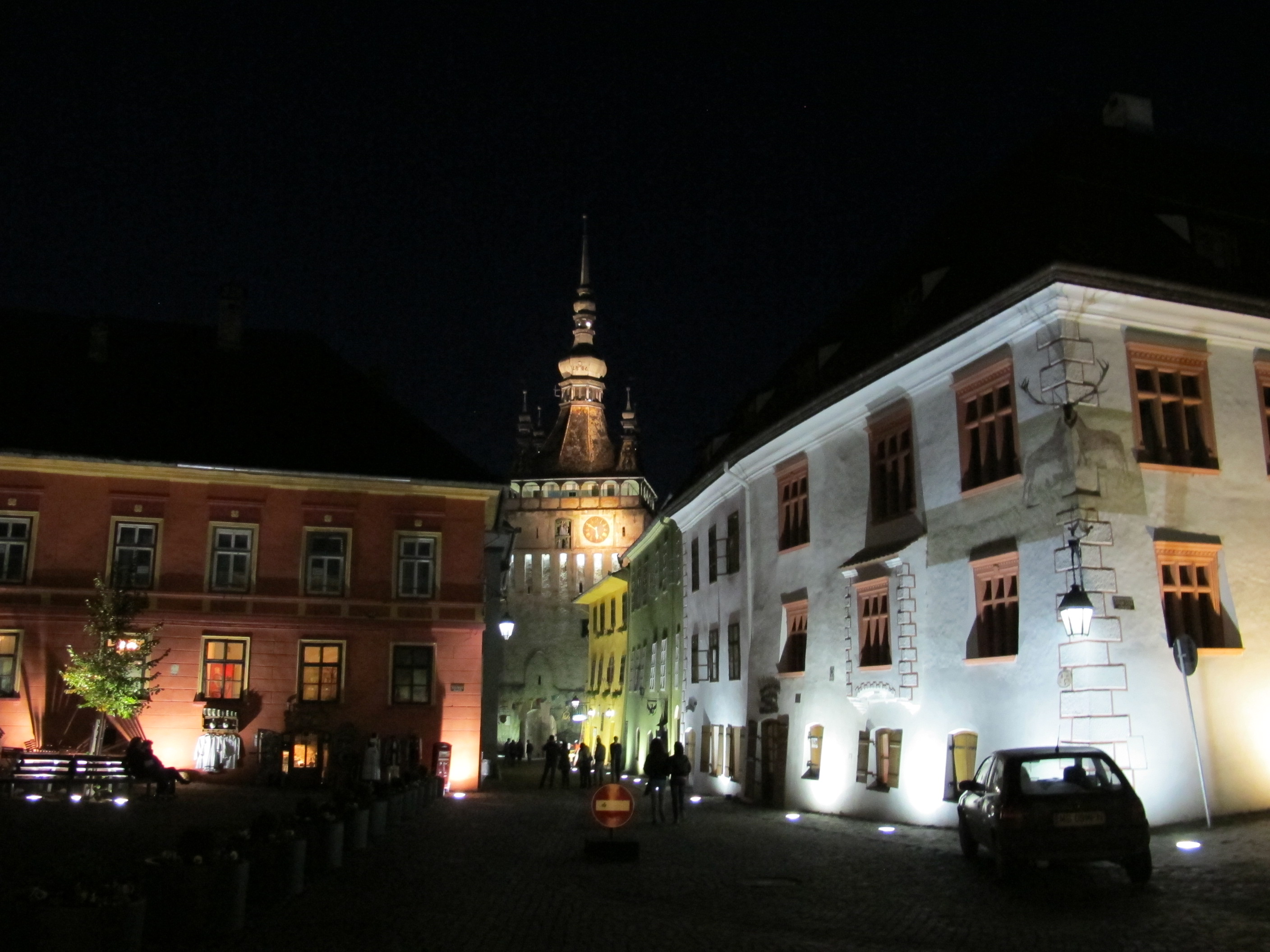
The citadel square by night

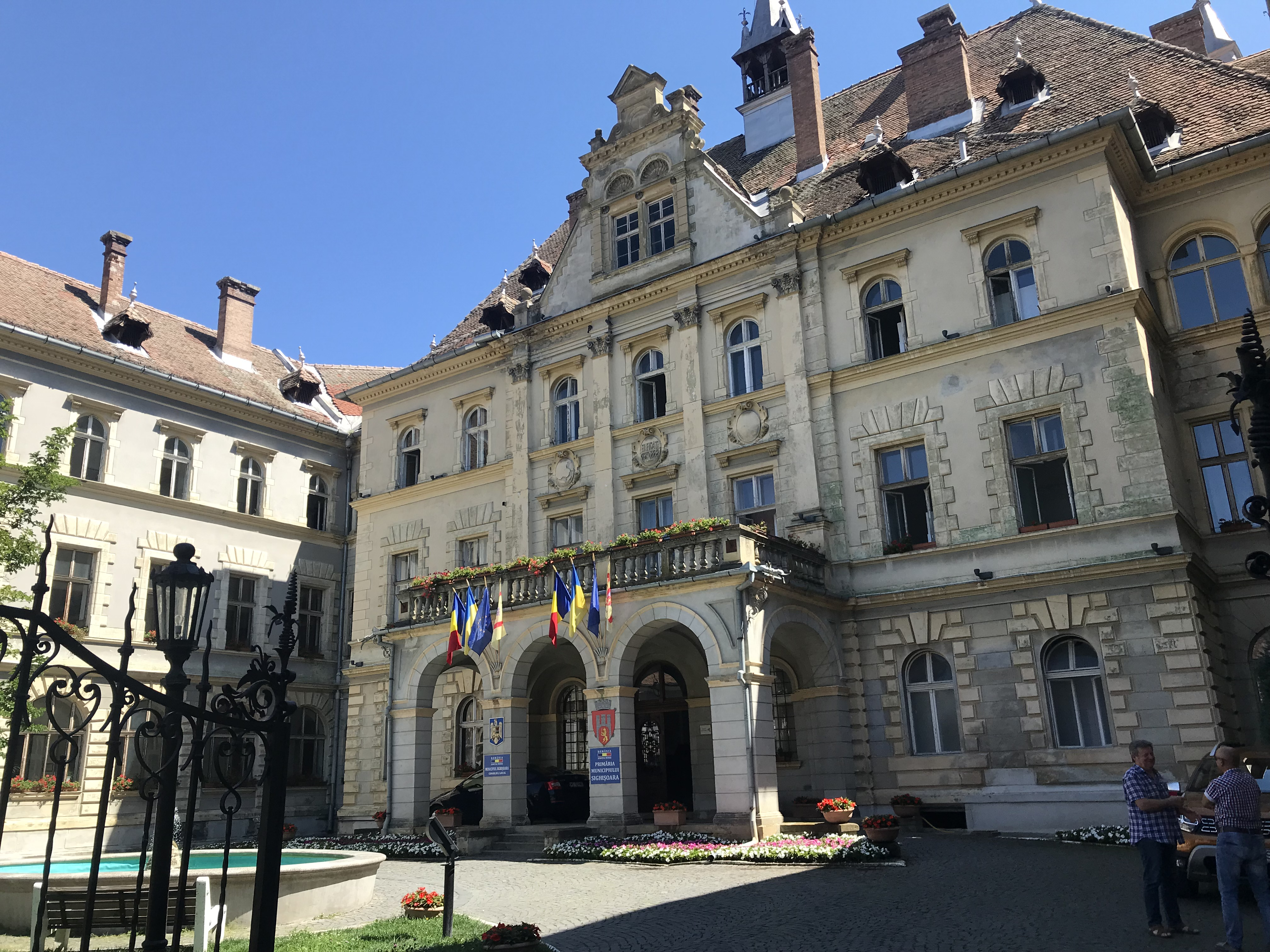
Sighișoara town hall

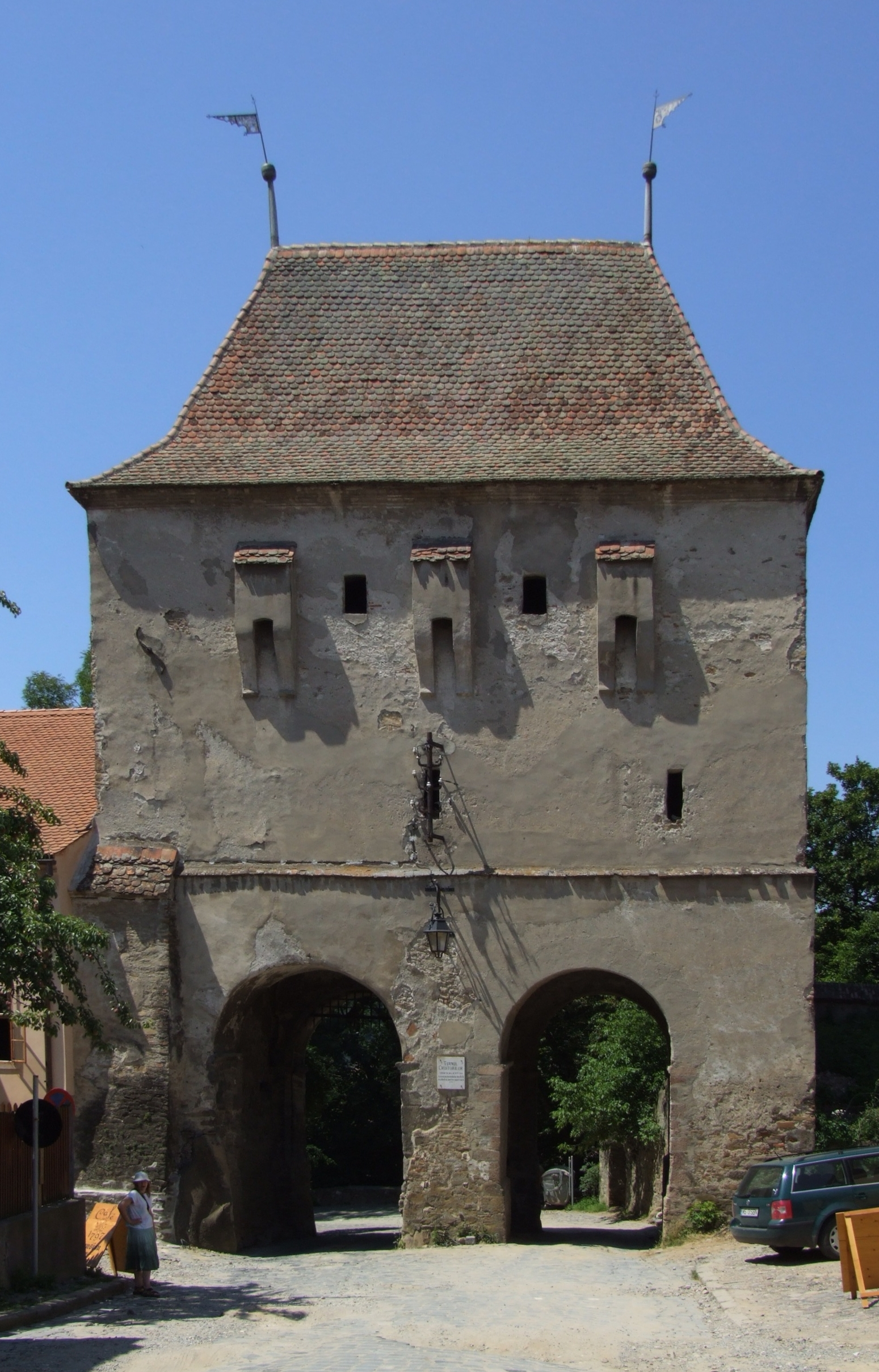
Tailors' Tower

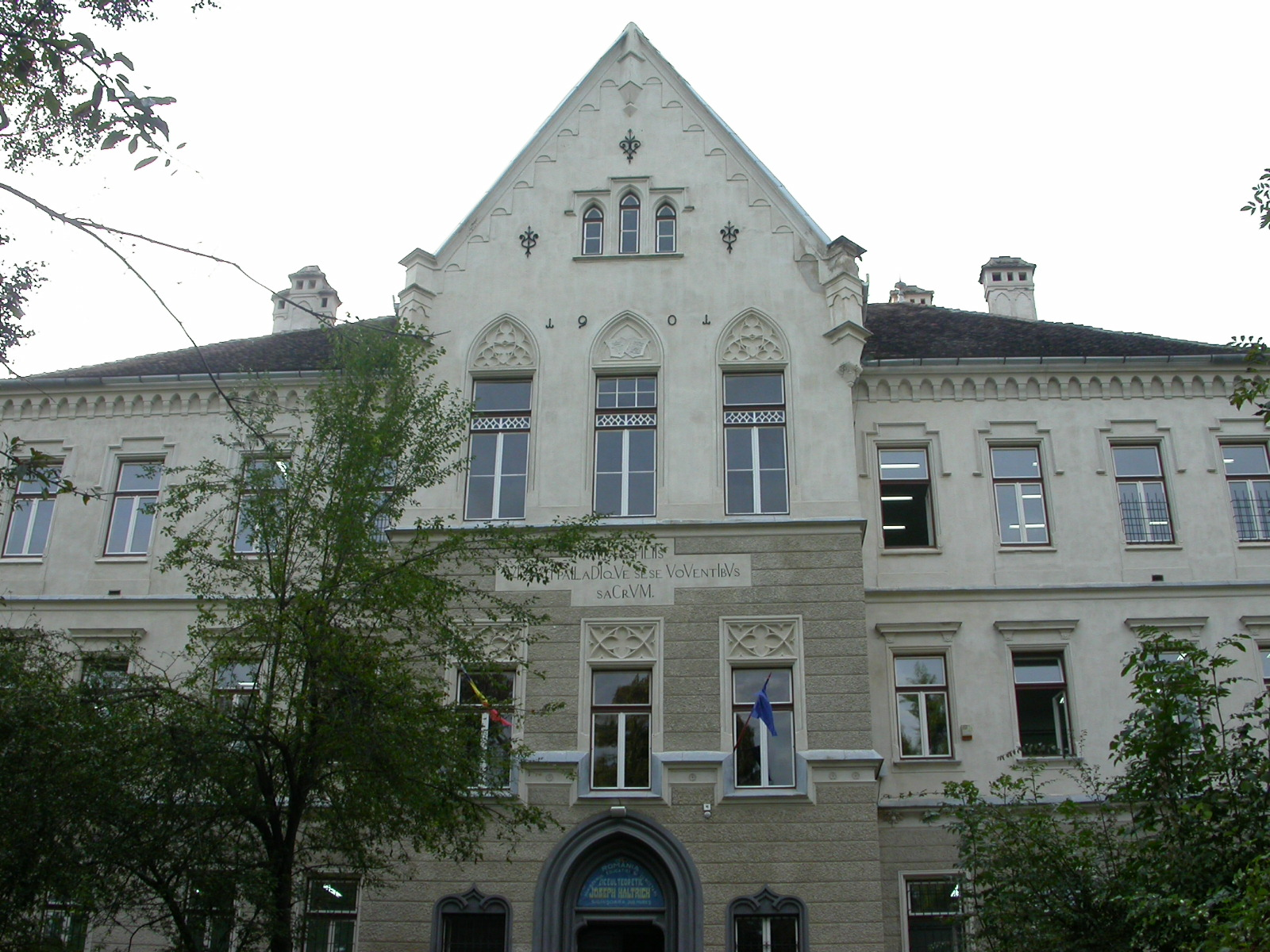
Joseph Haltrich high school

Decorative umbrellas at Strada Octavian Giga

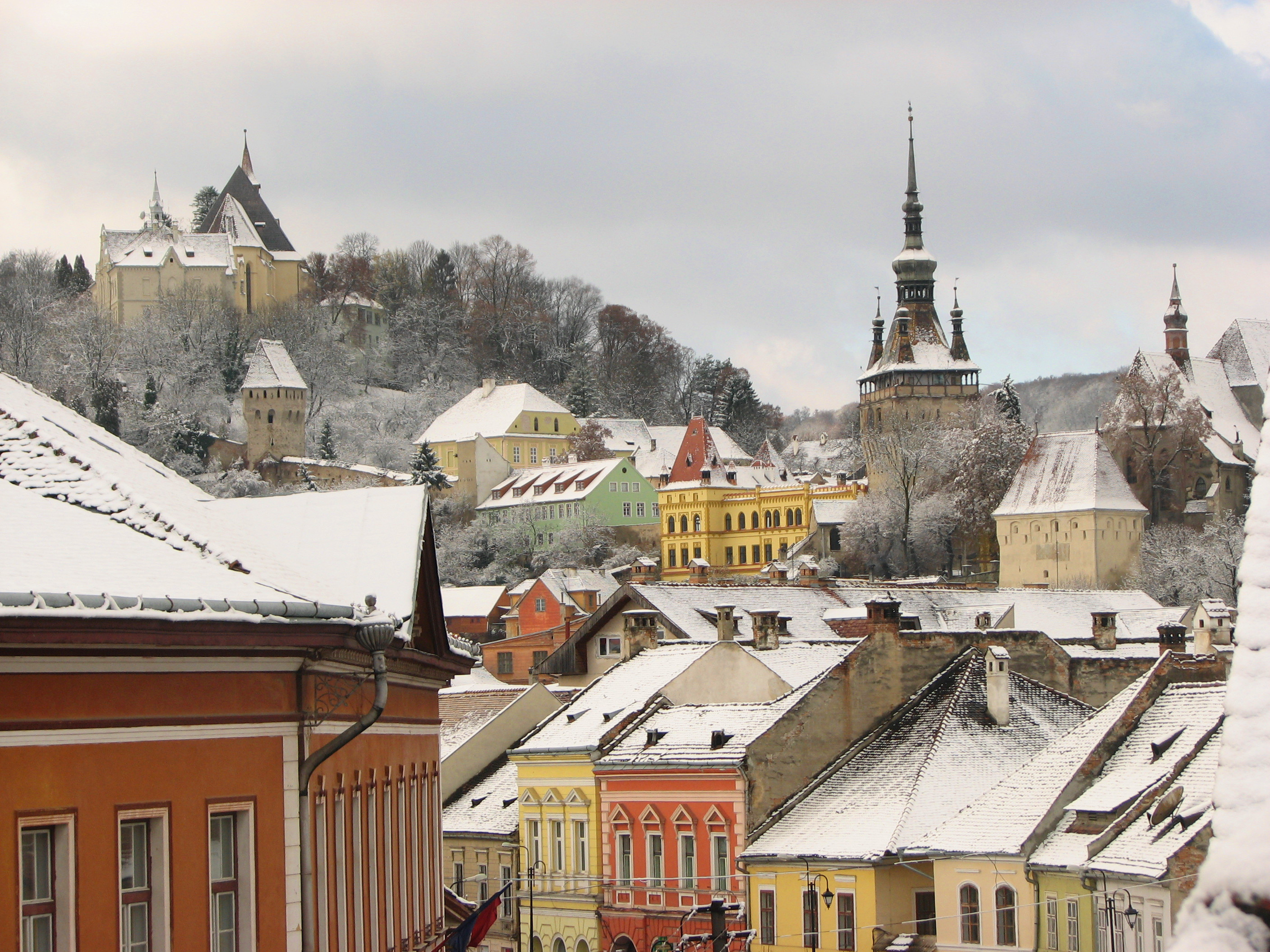
Central Sighișoara in the winter

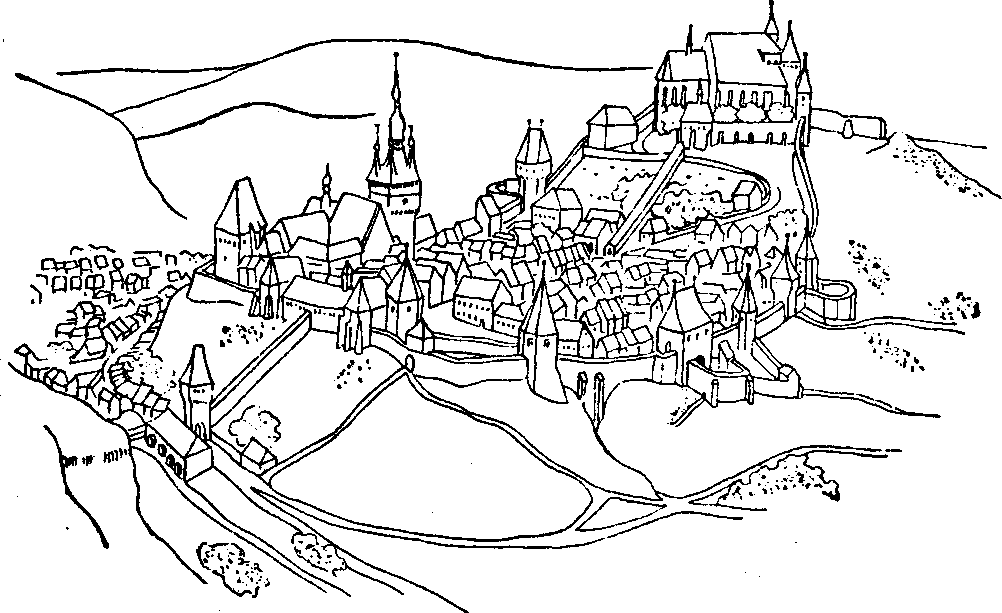
19th century reenacted drawing of Sighișoara

== See also ==
- List of Hungarian exonyms (Mureș County)
