= Juta Krulc =

Juta Zdešar Krulc
- Born: 18 April 1913; Radovljica, Austro Hungary
- Died: 22 June 2015 (aged 102); Golnik, Slovenia
- Known for: Landscape gardening Architecture

Juta Zdešar Krulc (1913–2015) was a Yugoslav landscape gardener, architect and artist. She worked into very old age and became known for being the oldest active garden designer in Slovenia.

== Early life ==
Krulc was born in Radovljica during World War I. In 1937, she graduated from the Department of Architecture at the Technical Faculty in Ljubljana, wher she studied under architect, Ivan Vurnik.

== Career ==
Krulc later moved to eastern Yugoslavia and became associated with the architect Mihajlo Nesic. She developed interest in Slovenian flora and painted for the Phenological Atlas. Along with Dušan Ogrin, she was involved in the revival of the Volčji Potok Arboretum. By the end of the 1950s her work focused on planning gardens for bourgeois mansions, influenced by the likes of Carl Gustav Swensson, Vaclav Heinic, Cecil Ross Pinsent, Georg Potente, and Ilse Fischerauer.

Her most notable achievements include planning the Villa Tartini Park in Strunjan, the Ljubljana Forestry Institute, and designing the gardens of Brdo Castle estate.

In 2012, Krulc received a recognition award for her work in Ziri, where an exhibition of over 30 gardens and 300 drawing plans were displayed.
