= Ogrin =

Ogrin is a surname. Notable people with the surname include:

- David Ogrin (born 1957), American golfer
- Dušan Ogrin (1929–2019), Slovene landscape architect
- Miran Ogrin (1914–1985), Slovene journalist
- Pat Ogrin (born 1958), American football player
