= Butchers' Tower =

Defense tower in Sighisoara, Romania

Coordinates: 46.2189°N 24.7900°E

Butchers' Tower (left) next to Furriers' Tower in 2024

The Butchers' Tower (Romanian: Turnul Măcelarilor, German: Fleischhauerturm) is one of the nine towers located in the Citadel of Sighişoara, belonging to Mureș County in Romania. The Butcher's Tower was built in the late 15th century. Originally, the tower was shaped in an eight-sided prism, but in the 16th century it was rebuilt on a hexagonal plan and was raised with the specific purpose of enlarging the field of view over the small bastion built right in front of it. The tower has three floors with five loopholes, and access was made, in the past, by the fortress wall gallery. The fire from 1676 did not affect the tower. The latter, together with the bastion, had great importance in the defense of the western side of the Citadel.

Documents from 1680 mention that the tower hosted five arquebuses, a few cannonballs and quintals of gunpowder.

The tower underwent restoration in 2023 with the project being nominated for the 2026 EUmies Award.
