= European Union Prize for Contemporary Architecture =

Architecture prize

The European Union Prize for Contemporary Architecture – Mies van der Rohe Award is a prize given biennially by the European Union and the Fundació Mies van der Rohe, Barcelona, 'to acknowledge and reward quality architectural production in Europe'.

The Prize was created in 1987 through an equal partnership among the European Commission, the European Parliament and the Fundació Mies van der Rohe. The award is open to all the works completed in Europe within the two-year period before the granting of the prize. Nominations are submitted by independent experts, the national architecture associations and the advisory committee of the Prize, and then evaluated by a jury organized for each cycle. The five finalist works are visited by the jury, which chooses a prize winner and names an Emerging Architect winner. Aalt Stadhaus won the prize in 2014.

As of 2016, a new category, the Young Talent Architecture Award (YTAA), highlights the final degree projects of recently graduated architects, landscape architects and urban designers. YTAA, as an inherent part of the European Union Prize for Contemporary Architecture – Mies van der Rohe Award, is organised by the Fundació Mies van der Rohe with the support of the Creative Europe programme of the European Union. YTAA is organised in partnership with the European Association for Architectural Education (EAAE) and the Architects’ Council of Europe (ACE-CAE); World Architects as a founding partner; the European Cultural Centre as a partner in Venice; sponsored by Jung, Jansen and Regent; and with the support of USM.

== List of award winners ==
Year	Winning Building	Shortlisted Buildings	
1988	Banco Borges e Irmão (Portugal) Vila do Conde; Architect(s): Alvaro Siza	(Italy) Gibellina, Museum of Gibellina; (Italy) Venice, Housing on Giudecca; (Italy) Alzate Brianza, Bank Head Quarters - Cassa Rurale e Artigiana; (Spain) Barcelona, Creueta del Coll Park; (Spain) Mérida, National Museum of Roman Art; (Spain) Barcelona, Bach de Roda- Felip II Bridge; (France) Paris, Housing Block, rue Ménil-Montant; (France) Paris, Arab Cultural Centre; (France) Paris, Orsay Museum; (France) Montrouge, Schlumberger Factories; (France) Chambéry-le-Bas, André-Malraux Cultural Centre	(France) Paris, St. Antoine Hospital Kitchen; (West Berlin) Berlin, Friedrichstadt Housing Block; (West Berlin) Tegel, Phosphate Elimination Plant; (West Germany) Frankfurt am Main, Gatehouse; (Portugal) Matosinhos, City Hall; (Netherlands) Amsterdam, Faculty of Arts; (Netherlands) Amsterdam, City Hall and Opera House; (Netherlands) Amsterdam, Haarlemmer Houttuinen Housing; (United Kingdom) London, Clore Gallery; (United Kingdom) Swindon, Renault Centre; (United Kingdom) London, Whitechapel Art Gallery; (United Kingdom) London, Lloyd's of London
1990	New Stansted Airport Terminal (United Kingdom) London; Architect(s): Foster + Partners	(Republic of Ireland) Knock, Chapel of Reconciliation; (Spain) Murcia, Hydraulic Museum and Cultural Centre in the Segura River Mills; Girona, Bank of Spain; (Spain) Zaragoza, Public State Library; (Spain) Madrid, Public Housing in Carabanchel; (France) Torcy, Children's Centre; (France) Paris, De La Villette Park; (France) Paris, The Grande Arche de la Défense; (France) Paris, Housing on Boulevard de Belleville; (France) Paris, New Ministry of Economics and Finances; (France) Paris, Archives of Paris; (France) Paris, Technical and Administrative Centre	(Netherlands) The Hague, Two Houses and Shops in the Van der Vennepark; (West Germany) Frankfurt am Main, The German Postal Museum; (West Berlin) Berlin, Checkpoint Charlie Housing; (United Kingdom) London, Thames Reach Housing; (Italy) Ivrea, New Olivetti Office Building; (Italy) Gibellina, Ricostruzione E Rinnovo Delle Case Di Stefano; (Portugal) Portalegre, Regional Social Security Centre; (Portugal) Porto, Cultural Centre for the Statate Secretariat of Culture; (Netherlands) Aerdenhout, Primary School for the School Association Aerdenhout Bentveld
1992	Municipal Sports Stadium (Spain) Badalona, Barcelona; Architect(s): Esteve Bonell and Francesc Rius	(Netherlands) Rotterdam, Van Beuningen-de Vriese Pavilion, Museum Boymansvan Beuningen; (Netherlands) Deventer, Church for the Moluccan Community; (Netherlands) Rotterdam, Museum of Art; (France) Nantes, « La Cité », Congress Centre and Concert Hall; (France) Nancy, School of Management; (France) Paris, City of Artists; (France) Saint-Cloud, Dall Ava Villa; (France) Paris, Rue de Meaux Housing Complex; (France) Paris, National Superior Conservatory of Dance and Music; (France) Paris, Nursery School - Bércy; (Spain) Igualada, Cemetery Park; (Spain) Salamanca, Convention Center; (Spain) Seville, The Finnish Pavilion; (Greece) Kos, Daidalos Tourist Resort; (Germany) Bonn, Art Museum	(Spain) Sant Esteve de Ses Rovires, Brians Penitentiary; (Spain) L'Estartit, Yacht Club of l'Estartit; (Spain) Madrid, Atocha Railway Station; (Spain) Seville, Santa Justa Railway Station; (Spain) Seville, The Danish Pavilion; (Germany) Munich, Gallery for a Private Collection of Contemporary Art; (Germany) Bonn, Plenary Complex Of The German Parliament; (Germany) Melsungen, Braun Headquarters and Industrial Complex; (Belgium) Zedelgem, M House; (Germany) Wiesbaden, Aktion Poliphile; (Portugal) Alcanena, House in Alcanena; (Portugal) Campo Maior, Municipal Swimming Pool; (United Kingdom) London, The Ark Office Building
1994	Waterloo International railway station (United Kingdom) London; Architect(s): Nicholas Grimshaw	(Belgium) Brasschaat, Single Family House; (Belgium) Antwerp, Fashion Design Atelier; (Denmark) Ebeltoft, European Film College; (Denmark) Copenhagen, Administrative Headquarters for E. Pihl & Søn A.s.; (France) Artenay, Strolling Players Museum; (France) Paris, Cartier Foundation; (France) Mulhouse, Ricola Europe, S.A; (France) Bousse, City Hall and Public Square; (France) Paris, Postmen's Flats Rue de l'Ourcq; (France) Paris, Charlety Stadium; (France) Paris, Bercy Front de Parc; (Germany) Aachen, Kaiserbad Building; (Germany) Münster, New City Library; (Germany) Weil am Rhein, Vitra Fire Station; (Italy) Milan, Rehabilitation of Saint Nazaro Square in Brolo; (Portugal) Lisbon, Institute for Communication	(Portugal) Aveiro, Department of Geosciences, Aveiro University; (Portugal) Lisbon, Dominican Monastery and Cultural Centre; (Spain) Sagunt, Restoration and Rehabilitation of the Roman Theatre; (Spain) Port de la Selva, Rehabilitation of the Monastery; (Spain) Palma de Mallorca, Fundació Pilar i Joan Miró in Mallorca; (Spain) Barcelona, CCCB- Centre for Contemporary Culture; (Spain) Barcelona, L'Illa Diagonal Block; (Netherlands) Maastricht, Academy of Art & Architecture; (Netherlands) Amsterdam, Residential Housing KNSM-Eiland; (United Kingdom) Lewes, Glyndebourne Opera House
1996	Bibliothèque Nationale de France; Paris; Architect(s): Dominique Perrault	(Belgium) Eeklo, Transformation of a Former Milk Factory in an Office Building; (Austria) Seibersdorf, Office and Research Centre Seibersdorf; (Austria) Murau, Footbridge over the Mur; (Cyprus) Avgorou, Primary School of Avgorou; (Czech Republic) Brno, Investment and Post Bank Brno; (Denmark) Copenhagen, Ny Carlsberg Glyptotek Extension; (Finland) Helsinki, Shipboy Housing; (Finland) Virolahti, Teboil Gas Station; (France) Mont Beuvray, European Archaeological Center; (France) Arles, Archeological Museum and Research Centre; (France) Bordeaux, University House of Arts; (France) Grenoble, Arts and Human Sciences Building; (France) Paris, Boileau Apartments, Transformation of an Office Block into Housing; (France) Lyon, Cité Internationale (first phase); (Germany) Hannover, Hall 26; (Germany) Berlin, Friedrichstadt Passagen - Block 207; (Germany) Brühl, Babanek House	(Greece) Marousi, House for Art Collector; (Greece) Attica, House at Kiourka; (Republic of Ireland) Dublin, Temple Bar Framework Plan; (Norway) Alvdal, Aukrust Center; (Portugal) Porto, Residential Block in Rua do Teatro; (Spain) Zamora, Archaeological and Fine Arts Museum; (Spain) Morella, Single Family House; (Spain) Castelló de la Plana, IMPIVA Headquarters; (Spain) Madrid, Banco de Santander Headquarters; (Spain) Mérida, New Offices for the Estremadura Geovernment; (Netherlands) Utrecht, Faculty of Economics and Management; (Netherlands) Vaals, Police Station; (Netherlands) Hoenderloo, Porterlodges for the National Park De Hoge Veluwe; (Switzerland) Winterthur, Extension of Kunstmuseum; (Switzerland) Basel, Signal Box Auf dem Wolf; (Switzerland) Monte Carasso, Urban Project at Monte Carasso; (Switzerland) Vals, Thermal Bath
1998	Kunsthaus Bregenz (Austria) Bregenz; Architect(s): Peter Zumthor === Other finalists === : (Switzerland) Appenzell, Museum Liner Appenzell (renamed: Kunstmuseum Appenzell); (Switzerland) Riehen, Beyeler Foundation; (France) Bordeaux, Villa in Bordeaux	(Spain) Villanueva de la Cañada, Cultural Center; (Spain) Alicante, University Museum; (Spain) Madrid, Indoor Swimming Pool; (United Kingdom) Henley-on-Thames, River and Rowing Museum; (Austria) Innsbruck, Faculty of Social and Economic Sciences; (Austria) St. Pölten, Lower Austrian Regional Archive and Regional Library; (Austria) Graz, Departments for Information Technology; (Republic of Ireland) Dublin, Ranelagh Multi-Denominational School; (France) Tourcoing, Le Fresnoy National Studio for Contemporary Arts; (France) Paris, Social Housing rue des Lyanes; (France) Lille, Fine Arts Museum Extension and Renovation; (Germany) Velen, Secondary School Extension	(Germany) Frankfurt am Main, Commerzbank Headquarters; (Germany) Berlin, Baumschulenweg Crematorium; (Netherlands) Burgh-Haamstede, Salt Water Pavilion; (Netherlands) Vrouwenpolder, Fresh Water Pavilion; (Netherlands) Rotterdam, Theatre Square; (Poland) Kraków, Blue end of the road; (Belgium) Ghent, House Van Hee; (Portugal) Marco de Canaveses, Santa María Church; (Portugal) Amares, Braga, Santa María do Bouro Convent Reconversion; (Portugal) Vila do Conde, LNIV (National Veterinary Investigation Laboratory); (Switzerland) Vella, New Construction of School Site Including Multipurpose Hall; (Switzerland) Losone, Gym; (Finland) Turku, Art Academy; (Slovenia) Ljubljana, Nursing School; (Sweden) Stockholm, Museums of Modern Art and Architecture
2001	Kursaal Centre (Spain) San Sebastián; Architect(s): Rafael Moneo Other finalists: (Denmark) Copenhagen, Unibank Headquarters/Hovedsaede for Nordea; (France) Nantes, Courthouse; (Spain) Santillana del Mar, Altamira Museum and Research Centre	(Belgium) Machelen aan de Leie, Roger Raveel Museum; (Czech Republic) Prague, Muzo Centre; (Germany) Hamburg, Music School; (Germany) Hannover, Dutch Pavilion, EXPO 2000; (Germany) Bobingen, Kaufmann Holz AG Distribution Centre; (Germany) Berlin, GSW Headquarters; (Germany) Berlin, Embassies of the Nordic Countries; (Germany) Berlin, New German Parliament; (United Kingdom) London, Canary Wharf Underground Station; (United Kingdom) London, NatWest Media Centre; (United Kingdom) London, Peckham Library and Media Centre; (United Kingdom) Walsall, New Art Gallery and Public Square; (Spain) Riudaura, Recreation and Culture Centre; (Spain) Toledo, La Granja Escalator; (Spain) Seville, Herrera House; (Spain) Barcelona, La Clota House; (Spain) Barcelona, Botanical Garden	(Spain) Santiago de Compostela, Faculty of Information Science; (Spain) Castelló de la Plana, Fine Arts Museum; Ljubljana, Chamber of Commerce and Industry of Slovenia Office Building; (Slovenia) Srebrniče, Srebrnice Cemetery; (Portugal) Castelo de Montemor-o-Velho, Tea House in Paço das Infantas; (Portugal) Matosinhos, Courtyard Houses; (Portugal) Coimbra, Student Housing at Polo II, Universidade de Coimbra; (Italy) Venice, Apartment Building D, Giudecca; (Netherlands) Rotterdam, New Luxor Theatre; (Netherlands) Nijmegen, Het Valkhof Museum; (Netherlands) Utrecht, Utrecht City Hall; (Netherlands) Amsterdam, Borneo Sporenburg; (Greece) Athens, House in Palaio Psychico; (Greece) Thessaloniki, New HELEXPO Gates; (France) Amiens, La Licorne Football Stadium; (France) Montpellier, Private Housing; (Austria) Innsbruck, Lohbach Residences
2003	Car Park and Terminus Hoenheim North (France) Hoenheim, Strasbourg; Architect(s): Zaha Hadid Other finalists: (France) Paris, Palais de Tokyo - Site for Contemporary Creation; (Netherlands) Breda, Chassé Park Apartments; (Netherlands) The Hague, Hagen Island	(Republic of Ireland) Letterfrack, The Furniture College; (Republic of Ireland) Dunshaughlin, Civic Offices, Town Hall, One-Stop Shop; (Netherlands) Wijlre, Hedge House Art Gallery; (Netherlands) Hilversum, Commissariaat voor de Media Building; (Netherlands) Groningen, Schots 1 and 2; (United Kingdom) London, House on Bacon Street; (United Kingdom) London, The Red House on Tite Street; (United Kingdom) St Austell, Eden Project; (United Kingdom) Manchester, Imperial War Museum North; (Spain) Cerdanyola del Vallès, M&M Houses; (Spain) Olot, Tossols-Basil Track and Field Stadium; (Spain) León, Ciudad de León Auditorium; (Spain) Fisterra, Fisterra Cemetery; (Spain) Madrid, Public Library in Usera; (Spain) Granada, Granada General Savings Bank; (Spain) Sant Vicent del Raspeig, Lecture Hall 3, University of Alicante; (Spain) Mollet del Vallès, Park of Colors; (Belgium) Bruges, Concert Hall; (France) Troyes, Multimedia Library; (France) Vénissieux, Multimedia Library	(France) Grenoble, University of Arts & Human Sciences (2nd phase); (Italy) Venice, Material Testing Laboratory IUAV; (Italy) Caltagirone, Strip Park between Caltagirone & San Michele di Ganzaria; (Norway) Oslo, Mortensrud Church; (Portugal) Alcácer do Sal, Dr. Saraiva Lima House; (Czech Republic) Prague, Palác Euro Building; (Czech Republic) Prague, Pathway through the Jelení Příkop – Prague Castle; (Austria) Wenns, M-Preis Supermarket; (Austria) Innsbruck, Bergisel Ski Jump; (Austria) Vienna, Museumsquartier Wien: Mumok, Kunsthalle, Leopold Museum; (Denmark) Næstved, Multipurpose Building; (Germany) Würzburg, Art Depot; (Germany) Oranienburg, Soviet Special Camp Memorial Nr.7/Nr.1 in Sachsenhausen; (Germany) Leipzig, A Second Nature Landscape Cospuden; (Germany) Unterföhring, Swiss Re Office Building; (Germany) Dresden, Dresden Synagogue; (Germany) Ostfildern, Scharnhauser Park Town Hall
2005	Netherlands Embassy Berlin (Germany) Berlin; Architect(s): Rem Koolhaas Other finalists: (United Kingdom) London, 30 St Mary Axe; (United Kingdom) Birmingham, Selfridges & Co. Department Store; (Portugal) Braga, Braga Municipal Stadium; (Spain) Barcelona, Forum 2004 Esplanade and Fotovoltaic Plant	(Austria) Graz, Kunsthaus Graz; (Austria) Graz, Museum for Children; (Austria) Vienna, T-Center St. Marx; (Austria) Baden, Efaflex Door Systems; (Portugal) Madeira, Arts Center, Casa das Mudas; (Sweden) Gothenburg, Museum of World Culture; (Turkey) Antalya, Minicity Model Park (dismantled); (Netherlands) Utrecht, University Library Utrecht; (France) Paris, Teenager Hospital; (France) Paris, Ministry of Culture and Communication - Ilôt des Bons Enfants; (France) Bogny-sur-Meuse, Ardennes Leather Tannery; (Netherlands) Huizen, Sphinxes; (Italy) Maranello, Ferrari Product Development Center; (United Kingdom) Isle of Tiree, An Turas Ferry Shelter; (Germany) Hennigsdorf, Town Hall	(Czech Republic) Teplá, Monastery of Our Lady of Nový Dvůr; (Finland) Kärsämäki, Kärsämäki Church; (United Kingdom) Dungeness, Vista; (France) Mulhouse, Social Housing (14 dwellings in Cité Manifeste); (Germany) Gelnhausen, Living room; (Denmark) Copenhagen, Maritime Youth Centre; (Netherlands) Utrecht, BasketBa; (Spain) Barcelona, Pedestrian Bridge and Capitania Building; (France) Millau, Millau Viaduct; (Spain) Córdoba, Restoration of the Martos Mill and Urban Development of the Stadium Bank; (Spain) Barcelona, South-east Coastal Park; (Spain) Barcelona, Barcelona International Convention Centre
2007	Contemporary Art Museum of Castilla y León (Spain) León; Architect(s): Mansilla+Tuñón Arquitectos Other finalists: (Germany) Stuttgart, Mercedes-Benz Museum; (Germany) Wolfsburg, Phæno Science Centre; (France) Bordeaux, School for Management; (France) Aix-en-Provence, National Choreographic Centre; (Spain) Valencia, America's Cup Building; (Portugal) Sines, Sines Arts Centre	(Austria) Vienna, Fluc 2, Music and Art Club, Transformation of a Pedestrian Underpass	
2009	Norwegian National Opera and Ballet (Norway) Oslo; Architect(s): Snøhetta Other finalists: (France) Strasbourg, Zenith Music Hall; (France) Nice, Tramway terminal of Nice; (Italy) Milan, University Luigi Bocconi; (Spain) Barcelona, Library, Senior Citizens Centre & Interior Courtyard	Hilversum, Netherlands Institute for Sound and Vision	
2011	Neues Museum (Germany) Berlin; Architect(s): David Chipperfield Other finalists: (Denmark) Copenhagen, Danish Radio Concert Hall; (Belgium) Brussels, BrOnks Youth Theatre; (Greece) Athens, Acropolis Museum; (Italy) Rome, MAXXI Museum of XXI Century Arts; (Netherlands) Arnhem, Groot Klimmendaal Rehabilitation Centre	(United Kingdom) London, South London Gallery	
2013	Harpa concert hall (Iceland) Reykjavík; Architect(s): Henning Larsen Architects and Studio Olafur Eliasson Other finalists: (Denmark) Copenhagen, Superkilen; (Belgium) Ghent, Market Hall; (Portugal) Alcácer do Sal, Nursing Home; (Spain) Seville, Metropol Parasol	(Italy) Gibellina, Museum of Gibellina	
2015	Szczecin Philharmonic Hall (Poland) Szczecin; Architect(s): Barozzi Veiga Other finalists: (United Kingdom) London, Saw Swee Hock Student Centre, London School of Economics; (Italy) Florence, Antinori Winery; (Germany) Ravensburg, Ravensburg Art Museum; (Denmark) Helsingør, Danish Maritime Museum	(Poland) Katowice, Scientific Information Centre and Academic Library	
2017	DeFlat Kleiburg (Netherlands) Amsterdam; Architect(s): NL Architects and XVW architectuur Other finalists: (Denmark) Ribe, Kannikegården; (United Kingdom) London, Ely Court; (Poland) Warsaw, Katyń Museum; (France) Rivesaltes/Ribesaltes, The Rivesaltes Memorial Museum	Community Workshop; Ariane futsal sports complex; Suvela Chapel; Moholt 50I50 – Timber Towers; Weekend House at Sildegarnsholmen; Angelos Organic Olive Oil Mill; Collective housing for elderly people and civic and health centre; Östermalm’s Temporary Market Hall; Merrion Cricket Pavilion; Polyvalent Infrastructure; Skjern River Pump Stations; Fondazione Prada; House in Oeiras; Puukuokka Housing Block (house 1); Granby Four Streets; Landmark Nieuw-Bergen	Holmes Road Studios; Barn; Rasu Houses; Shepherdess Walk Housing; Timmerhuis; House 1014; Opinmäki School; 59 Dwellings, Neppert Gardens Social Housing; Eldhusøya Tourist Route Project; Kvæsthus Pier; European Hansemuseum; EDP Headquarters; Nadir Afonso Museum for Contemporary Art; Beyazıt State Library Renovation; Model School Inchicore; Museum of the Royal Collections
2019	Transformation of 530 dwellings — Grand Parc Bordeaux (France) Bordeaux; Architect(s): Lacaton & Vassal Other finalists: (Albania) Tirana, Skanderbeg Square; (Belgium) Melle, PC CARITAS; (Germany) Berlin, Terrassenhaus Berlin / Lobe Block; (Spain) Plasencia, Plasencia Auditorium and Congress Centre	(France) Freyming-Merlebach, ‘Théodore Gouvy’ Theatre; (France) Paris, ENSAE PARISTECH, Campus Paris-Saclay; (France) Paris, Lafayette Anticipations; (France) Nantes, Museum of Arts; (France) Montataire, The Perret Hall - Cultural Centre; (Denmark) Hammershus, Hammershus Visitors Centre; (Italy) Arezzo, Prada Productive Headquarter; (Austria) Vienna, Aspern Federal School; (Poland) Katowice, Silesia University's Radio and Television department; (Republic of Ireland) Kilkenny, St. Mary's Medieval Mile Museum; (Finland) Helsinki, Helsinki Central Library Oodi; (Romania) Bucharest, Occidentului 40; (Slovakia) Bratislava, Adaptation of the former factory Mlynica; (Belgium) Ghent, De Krook library; (Spain) Matarranya, Solo House; (Spain) Madrid, Desert City; (Spain) Barcelona, Civic Centre Lleialtat Santsenca	(Spain) Ullastret, House 1413; (Spain) Sant Ferran de ses Roques, LIFE REUSING POSIDONIA/ 14 social dwellings; (Belgium) Ternat, Residential care center Kapelleveld; (Austria) Innsbruck, House of Music Innsbruck; (Denmark) Billund, Lego House; (Italy) Venice, M9 Museum District; (Germany) Berlin, Residential and studio building at the former Berlin flower market; (Estonia) Tallinn, Arvo Pärt Centre; Bucharest, Restoration, refurbishment of the Headquarters of the order of Architects of Romania; (Serbia) Belgrade, Reconstruction of Museum of Contemporary Art; (Austria) Vienna, Performative Brise- Soleil; (Republic of Ireland) Dublin, 14 Henrietta Street; (Belgium) Ghent, Ryhove Urban Factory; (Netherlands) Leeuwarden, Visitor center park Vijversburg; (Netherlands) Arnhem, Musis Sacrum; (Portugal) Lisbon, Cruise Terminal
2022	Town House – Kingston University (United Kingdom) Kingston upon Thames; Grafton Architects Other finalists: (Spain) 85 Social Housing Units in Cornellà; (France) Paris, The Railway Farm; (Belgium) Hasselt, Z33 House for Contemporary Art, Design and Architecture; (Germany) Berlin, Frizz 23	Vertical Farm; Local Activity Centre; The Great Synagogue Memorial Park; Atelierhaus C.21; Recovery of Merola’s Tower; Nursery and Primary School; Market Square Ptuj; Extension and Reconstruction of the Vizafogó Kindergarten; Housing Rack / Pre-fab House in Berlin; Student Residence and Reversible Car Park; The Hill House Box; Revitalization of a Town House; Gare Maritime; Pierres Blanches Cultural Centre; The Malt Factory; Gleis 21 – We bring the village to the city; LocHal Public Library	Dexamenes Seaside Hotel; Fabra & Coats & Social Housing; Marquês de Abrantes’ Palace; Melopee Multipurpose School Building; Vindmøllebakken; Urban Spaces 2 / Mumuleanu 14 Apartment Building; New Gallery and Casemates / New Bastion; Prague Eyes – Riverfront Revitalisation; Second Home Offices in Holland Park; School Campus Neustift; Helsinki Olympic Stadium Refurbishment and Extension; Portas do Mar – Public Space and Car Parking; Interior Urban Block; Neue Nationalgalerie; Wadden Sea Centre
2024	Study Pavilion on the campus of TU Braunschweig (Germany) Braunschweig Gustav Düsing, Büro Max Hacke Other finalists: (Sweden) Lund, Hage; (Czech Republic) Ostrava, Plato Contemporary Art Gallery; (France) Sainte-Lucie-de-Tallano, Rebirth of the Convent Saint-François; (Spain) Madrid, Reggio School	(Belgium) Amal Amjahid – community facility along the canal in Molenbeek; (Republic of Ireland) Dublin, Annesley Gardens; (Netherlands) Almere, Art Pavilion M.; (Germany) Berlin, Building Community Kurfürstenstrasse; (Italy) Auronzo di Cadore, Bivouac Fanton; (Croatia) Cret Viljevski, Black Slavonian eco pig farm; (Slovenia) Bohinjska Bistrica, Bohinj Kindergarten; (Belgium) , Fire Station, Multi-Purpose Space, and Emergency Housing; (Portugal) Matosinhos, Escadinhas Footpaths; (Spain) Derio, Day centre for young people with autism spectrum disorder; (Slovenia) Stare Slemene, Covering the remains of the Church of St. John the Baptist in the Žiče Charterhouse; (Portugal) Porto, General Silveira Building; (Germany) Floating University Berlin; (Belgium) Anderlecht, Open air swimming pool FLOW; (Spain) Gavà, Social housing 1737; (Belgium) Het Steen, Antwerp; (Austria) IKEA Vienna western station / IKEA – the good neighbour in the city	(Croatia) RIDING HALL * Land Registry Department of the Municipal Civil Court in Zagreb; (Germany) Karlsruhe, Light Rail Tunnel; (Greece) Samos, Liknon; (Sweden) Stockholm, Liljevalchs+; (Spain) LIVING IN LIME - 42 social housing in Son Servera; (Croatia) Osekovo, Lonja Wetlands Wildlife Observatories and Visitor Centre; (France) Grasse, Média Library Charles Nègre; (Norway) Oslo, Munch Museum; (Spain) Municipal Pools in Castromonte; (Romania) Nursery. 1306 plants for Timișoara; (Slovakia) Bratislava, Reconstruction and extension and of the Slovak National Gallery; (France) Saint-Méen-Le-Grand, Refurbishment and extension of a community swimming pool; (Estonia) Tartu, Son of a Shingle – Vaksali pedestrian bridge and underpasses; (Austria) Vienna, Townhouse Neubaugasse; (Poland) Błonie, Targ Blonie_Food Market; (Georgia (country)) Tbilisi Urban Forest (Narikala Ridge Forest)
2026	Palais des Expositions (Belgium) Charleroi; Architect(s): AgwA & architecten jan de vylder inge vinck Other finalists: (Spain) Terrassa, Rehabilitation of Vapor Cortès – Prodis 1923; (France) La Bouëxière, Josephine Baker – Marie-Jose Perec Sports and Cultural Centre; (France) Arles, Lot 8, LUMA Arles – Renovation of Le Magasin Électrique; (Croatia) Dubrovnik, Gruž Market		

== List of Emerging Architect Special Mention ==
Year	Architect(s)	Building	Location
2001	Florian Nagler	Kaufmann Holz AG Center of distribution	(Germany) Bobingen
2003	Jürgen Mayer H.	Stadthaus Scharnhauser Park	(Germany) Ostfildern
2005	NL Architects	BasketBar	(Netherlands) Utrecht
2007	Bevk Perovic arhitekti	Department of Mathematics, Faculty of Physics and Mathematics	(Slovenia) Ljubljana
2009	Studio UP	Gymnasium 46° 09' N / 16° 50' E	(Croatia) Koprivnica
2011	Bosch.Capdeferro Arquitectures	Collage House	(Spain) Girona
2013	Langarita-Navarro Architects	Red Bull Music Academy	(Spain) Madrid
2015	ARQUITECTURA-G	Casa Luz	(Spain) Cilleros
2017	MSA and V+	NAVEZ - 5 social units as Northern entrance of Brussels	(Belgium) Brussels

== See also ==
- List of architecture prizes
