= Bijlmermeer =

Coordinates: 52°19′N 4°58′E

- Neighbourhood of Amsterdam
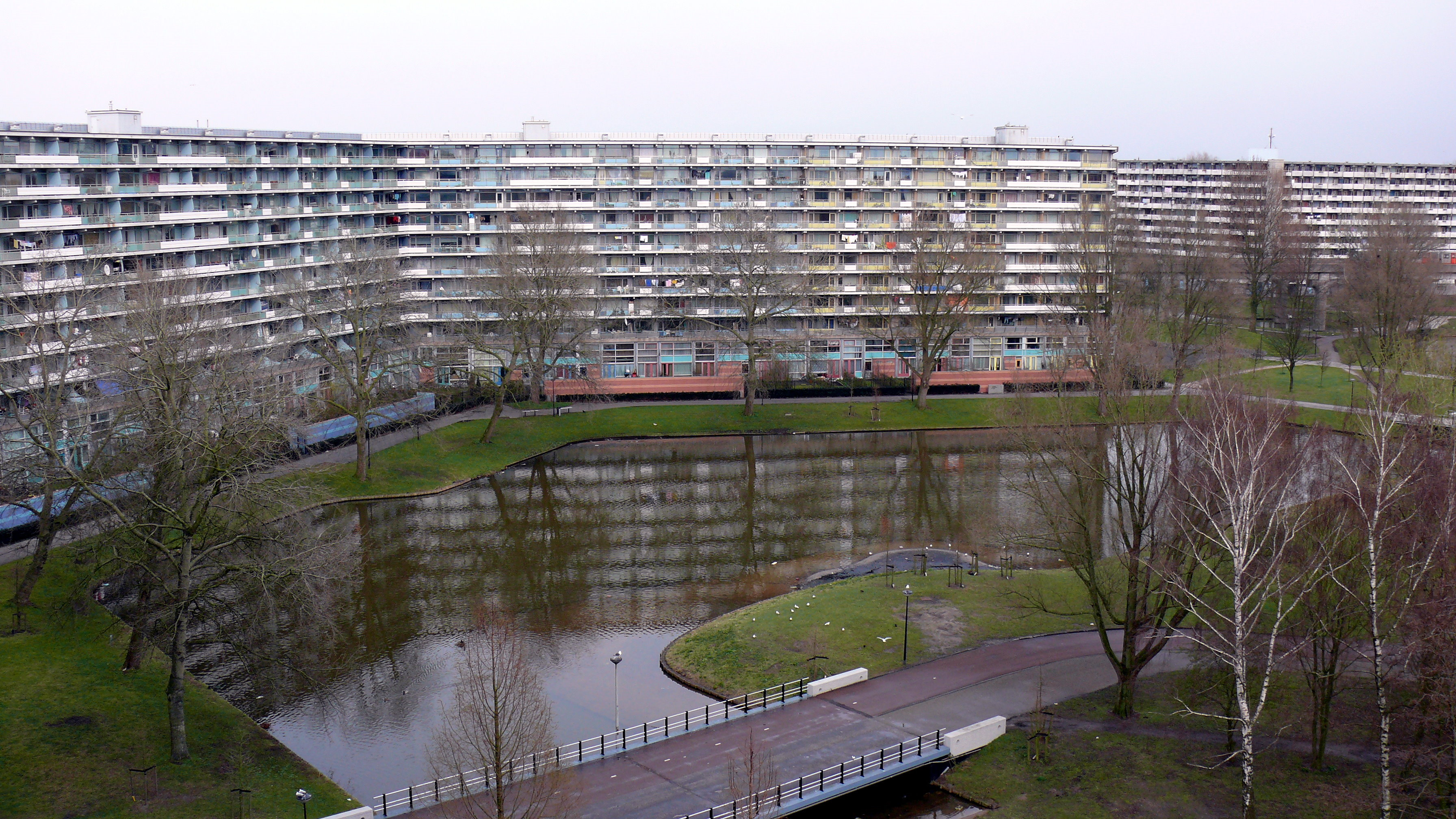
- View from Gooioord in Bijlmer
- Nickname: Bijlmer
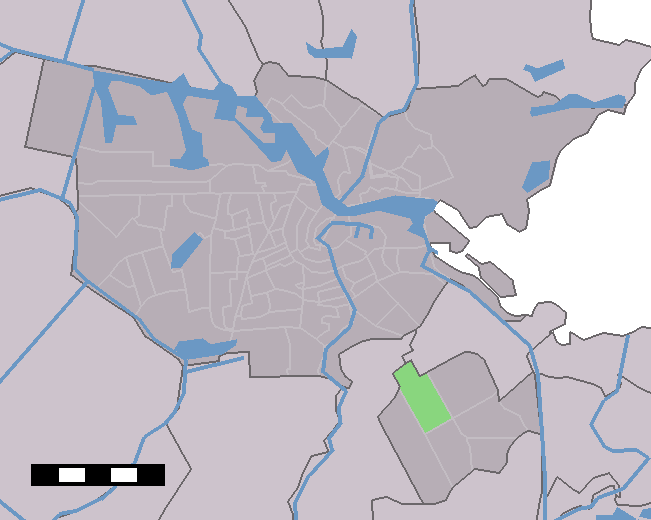
- Country: Netherlands
- Province: North Holland
- Municipality: Amsterdam
- Borough: Amsterdam-Zuidoost
- Opened: 1968
- Time zone: UTC+1 (CET)
- Postal codes: 1102, 1103, 1104
- Area code: 020
- Metro lines: 50, 53, 54

The Bijlmermeer (pronounced [ˌbɛilmərˈmeːr]), or colloquially the Bijlmer (pronounced [ˈbɛilmər]), is a neighborhood in the Amsterdam-Zuidoost borough (Dutch: stadsdeel) in Amsterdam, Netherlands. The other neighborhoods in Amsterdam-Zuidoost are Gaasperdam, Bullewijk, Venserpolder and Driemond.

== History ==
=== Bijlmermeer ===
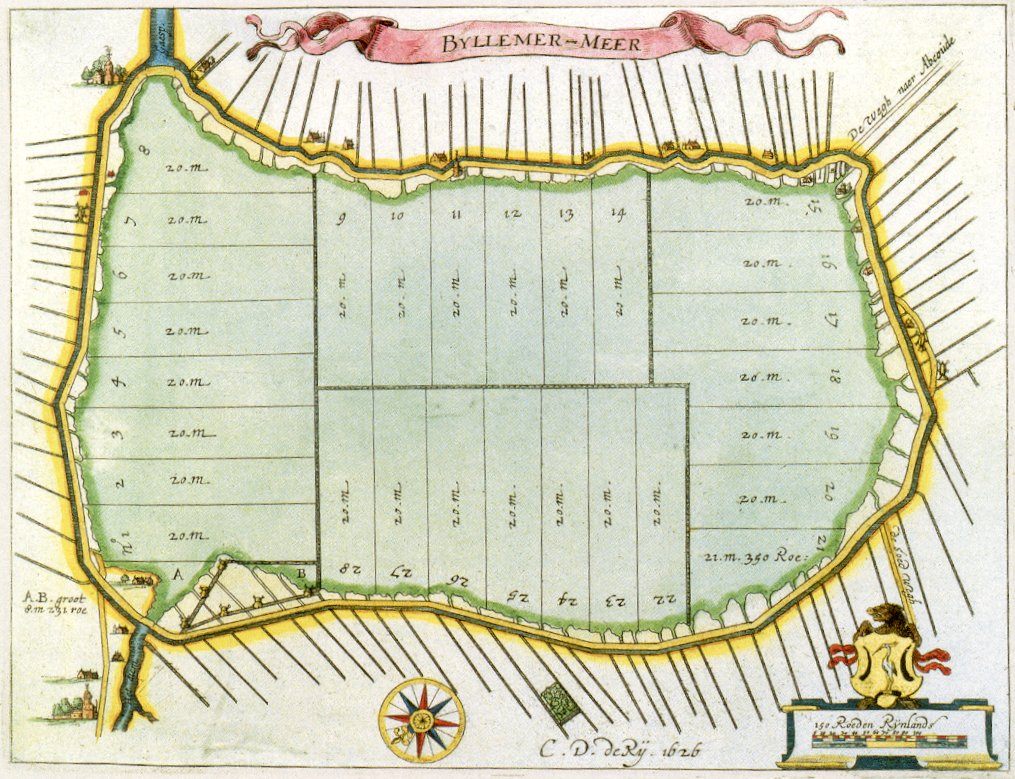
Bijlmermeer polder in 1626, from Joan Blaeu's atlas

The Bijlmermeer was originally the name of a lake. In the early 17th century, more agricultural land was needed near Amsterdam. The grain imports from countries at the Baltic Sea became more expensive. So it was decided to drain the Bijlmermeer to increase domestic grain production. Land reclamation began in the 1620s. By 1626 it was transformed into a polder.

It was also a former municipality in North Holland. In 1840, there were 23 houses and circa 180 inhabitants. Between 1812 and 1817, the municipality was annexed by Weesp. On 1 January 1848, the municipality was abolished and annexed by Weesperkarspel.

The current Bijlmer neighborhood is in nearly the same place. The southern part was built in the West Bijlmerpolder to the west and in the East Bijlmerpolder to the south of the Bijlmermeer.

=== Modernist urban design ===
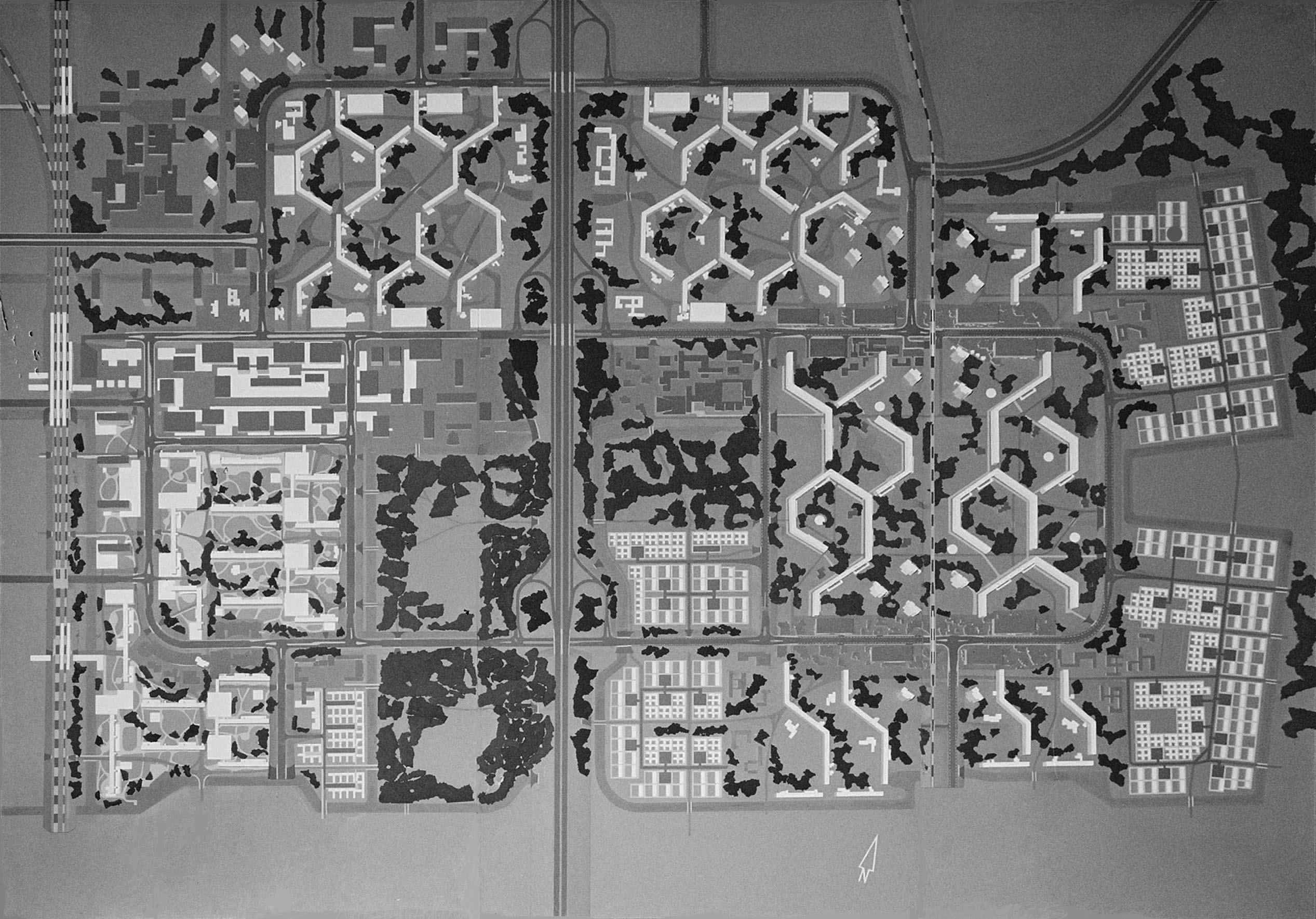
Bijlmermeer, masterplan 1965 (Siegfried Nassuth)

The Bijlmer neighbourhood was designed as a single project of a then innovative Modernist approach to urban design in the 1960s. Led by architect Siegfried Nassuth and team, the original neighborhood was designed as a series of nearly identical high-rise buildings laid out in a hexagonal grid. The goal was to create open spaces for recreation at grade, elevated roads to reduce pollution and traffic from those same recreation areas, and residences climbing upward offering residents views, clean air, and sunlight. The apartments were meant to attract a suburban population, in the manner of condominium housing. The buildings have several features that distinguish them from traditional Dutch high-rise flats, such as tubular walkways connecting the flats and garages. The blocks are separated by large green areas planted with grass and trees. Each flat has its own designated garage space where cars can be parked.

The Bijlmer was designed with two levels of traffic. Cars drive on the top level, the decks of which fly over the lower levels, pedestrian avenues and bicycle paths. This separation of fast and slow moving traffic is conducive to traffic safety. However, in recent years, the roads are once again being put into a single plane, so pedestrians, cycles and cars travel alongside each other. This is a move to lessen the effects of the 'inhuman' scale of some of the Bijlmer's designs and improve safety using direct sightlines.

=== 1980–2000 ===
Since the 1980s, Bijlmermeer has been a residential area on the outskirts of Amsterdam. The urban plan developed in the 1970s had an innovative vision of suburban housing. When Suriname gained independence, many citizens immigrated to the Netherlands, but there was a shortage of housing. The plan was to build apartments in a car-free area with green spaces and water. The modernist urban design caused various negative issues such as a lack of openness to the city. Many middle class residents moved out which impoverished the Bijlmer with high crime rates and ghetto areas.

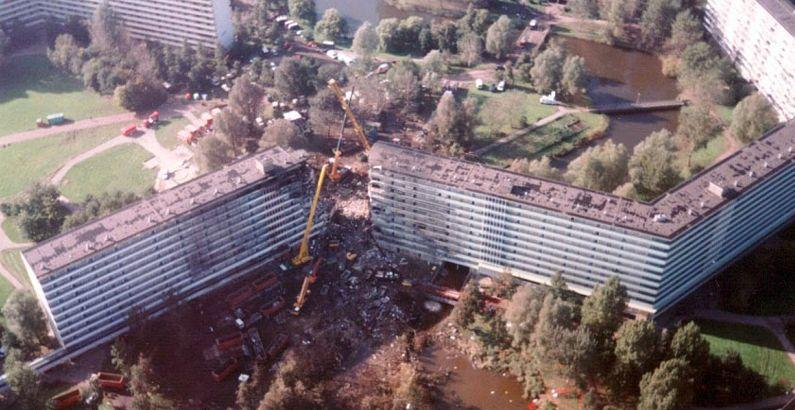
The Groeneveen and Klein-Kruitberg complexes after the crash of El Al Flight 1862

On 4 October 1992, Israeli El Al Flight 1862 lost two engines shortly after take-off from Schiphol at 6 PM. The 338-ton Boeing 747 cargo plane crashed into two 11-storey council flats (Groeneveen and Klein-Kruitberg). 43 people were killed, 39 of them on the ground. This accident is known as the Bijlmerramp (Dutch for "Bijlmer disaster"). It's considered the worst accident in Dutch aviation history.

=== Renovation ===
On November 17, 2007, the Amsterdam Bijlmer ArenA station was officially opened by Princess Máxima.

Due to the Bijlmer's peripheral position relative to the city center, it was decided that metro lines would be built to connect the Bijlmer with other neighborhoods. The Oostlijn (east line, comprising two lines, numbered 53 and 54) links the Bijlmer to Amsterdam Centraal station, while the Ringlijn links to the port area Sloterdijk.

Despite the construction of roads and the extension of metro Line 53 in the neighborhood, there remains a low employment rate of its residents. A clear improvement in the quality of life is marked by the various urban renewal projects of the municipality. A mosque was opened in the Bijlmermeer during the 1990s.

In recent years, many of the high rise buildings have been renovated or torn down. More expensive low-rise housing has been built to attract more middle- and upper-income residents. This resulted in significant reduction in crime and a more balanced socio-economic composition, whilst at the same time maintaining the area's ethnic mix. Bijlmer has been popular with students due to affordability.

In 2024, Bijlmermeer had nearly 50,000 people of over 150 nationalities.

== Social issues ==
High-rise buildings in the Bijlmermeer. Red are flats still standing, while gray is demolished. The plane icon marks the location of the El Al Flight 1862 crash.

Until recently, Bijlmermeer struggled to draw in many middle-class families. Following Suriname's independence in 1975, many of its inhabitants migrated to the Netherlands. The government placed a substantial number of them in affordable social housing in the Bijlmermeer. The inhabitants originate from many different countries and nationalities.

The neighbourhood once had a very high crime rate, but this has decreased dramatically in recent years. The number of registered complaints to the police decreased from 20,000 in 1995 (of which 2,000 were robberies) to 8,000 (of which 600 were robberies) in 2005.

== Events and sights ==
Amsterdam Zuidoost has the Johan Cruyff Arena, which hosts football matches of AFC Ajax and musical concerts, the Pathé ArenA multiplex cinema with 14 screens, the Heineken Music Hall and music and theatres, located in the business park area of Amsterdam Zuidoost, just to the west of the Bijlmer. The recreational strip is called the ArenA Boulevard. The strip mostly hosts concerts, with a very small number of bars and no night clubs. It has not been able to compete with Amsterdam's city centre for the casual Saturday night crowd.

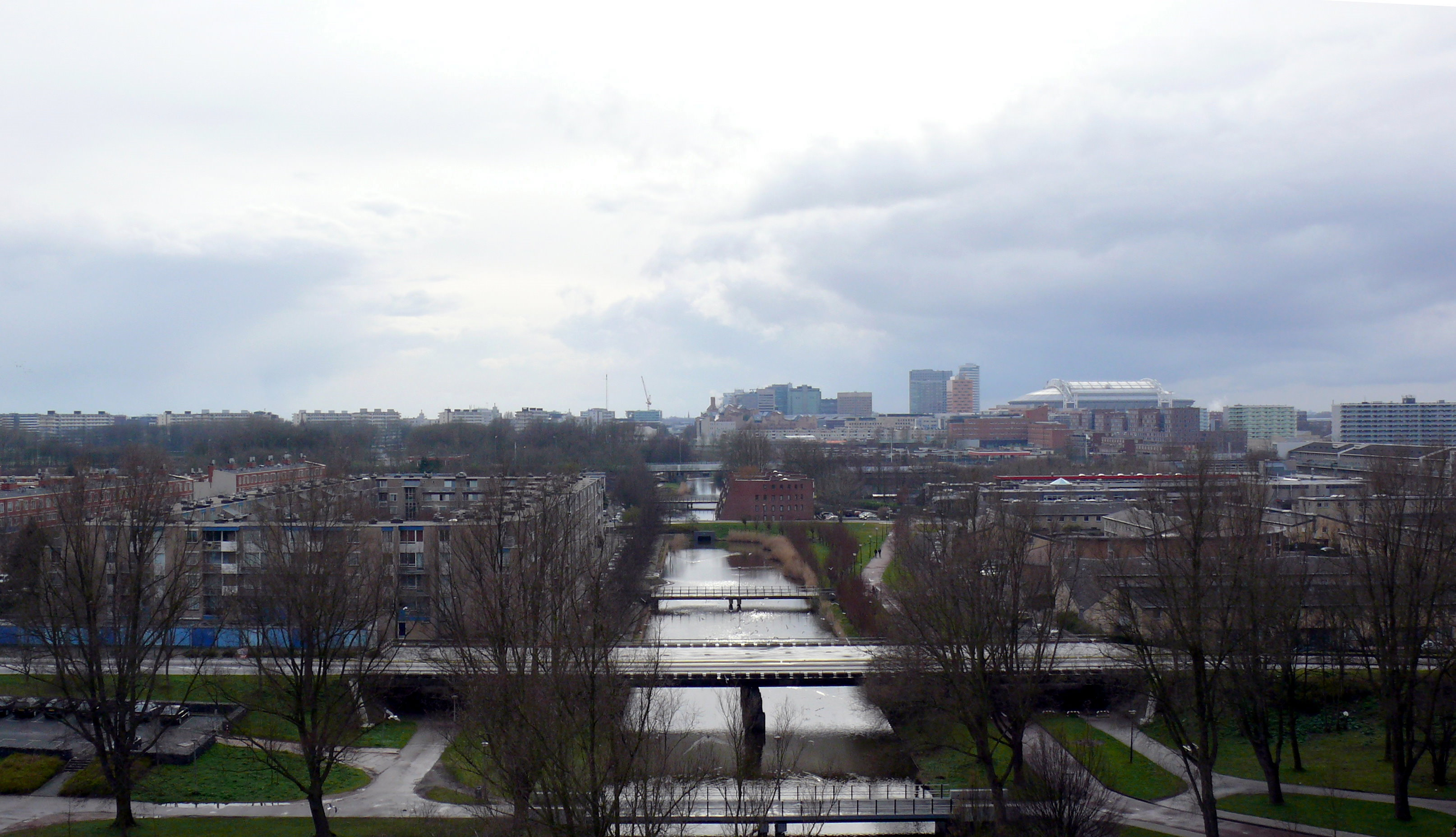
View from Gooioord, Bijlmer with the Amsterdam Arena in the distance

The Bijlmer boasts Amsterdam's biggest shopping centre, the "Amsterdamse Poort", though Amsterdam's city centre remains the largest shopping area. Alongside the shopping centre, the "Anton de Kom plein" (square) is completed, it houses a cultural centre and the borough administrative offices ("stadsdeelkantoor").

In 2012 the entire area from the Ziggo Dome in the west, Villa Arena home furnishings mall, the ArenA Boulevard and stadium, and the Amsterdamse Poort started being marketed as "ArenaPoort".

The 74,000 square metres (800,000 ft^{2}) mixed-use GETZ Entertainment Centre is planned to open on the ArenA Boulevard, including retail, catering industry, leisure, several types of entertainment, a hotel and a culture cluster.

The annual Kwaku Summer Festival is a six-weekend long multicultural festival during the summer, with Surinamese, Antillean and African food, music and other events.

The De Boom Die Alles Zag tree (The Tree That Saw Everything or The Tree That Saw It All) is a notable grey poplar tree and monument located in Bijlmermeer that survived the crash of El Al Flight 1862 on 4 October 1992.

== Bijlmer art crime scene ==
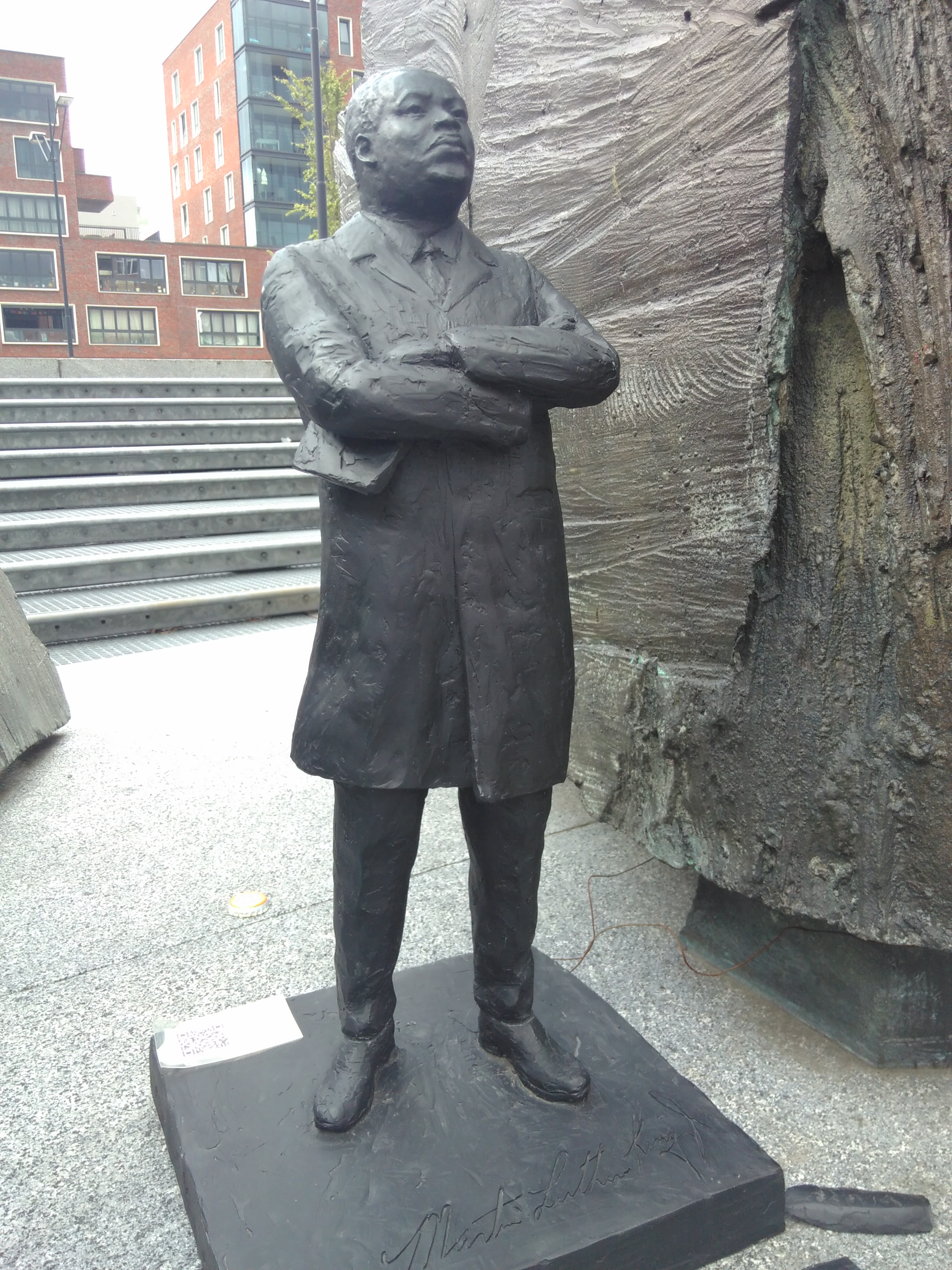
Statue of Martin Luther King Jr. by artist Arico Caravan, placed next to the statue of Anton de Kom as an artistic intervention

The presence of randomly placed art remains a bone of contention for residents of the Bijlmermeer. Artist Arico Caravan placed a small statue of Martin Luther King Jr. next to an existing statue of Anton de Kom. The original statue of Anton de Kom has received considerable criticism for its reproduction of tropes concerning black masculinity. In response to recent interventions by local artists and activist under the hashtag #Bijlmerartcrimescene, a group of local financial institutions have shown interest in addressing the matter.

== Notable people ==
Notable people who were born or raised in the Bijlmermeer:

- Amma Asante, politician
- Ryan Babel, footballer
- Kevin Bobson, footballer
- Remy Bonjasky, kickboxer
- Brian Brobbey, footballer
- Lucien Carbin, kickboxer
- Don Ceder, politician
- Mitchell Donald, footballer
- Steve van Dorpel, footballer
- Regian Eersel, kickboxer
- Akwasi Frimpong, sprinter
- Cerezo Fung-a-Wing, footballer
- Ortwin Linger, footballer
- Rob Kaman, kickboxer
- Javier Martina, footballer
- Tyrone Spong, kickboxer
- Guus Til, footballer
- Gloria Wekker, academic, writer
- Gilbert Yvel, mixed martial artist

== See also ==
- Amsterdam Bijlmer ArenA railway station
- Klushuis
