= Aalt Stadhaus =

Concert hall in Differdange, Luxembourg

Coordinates: 49.520936°N 5.887723°E

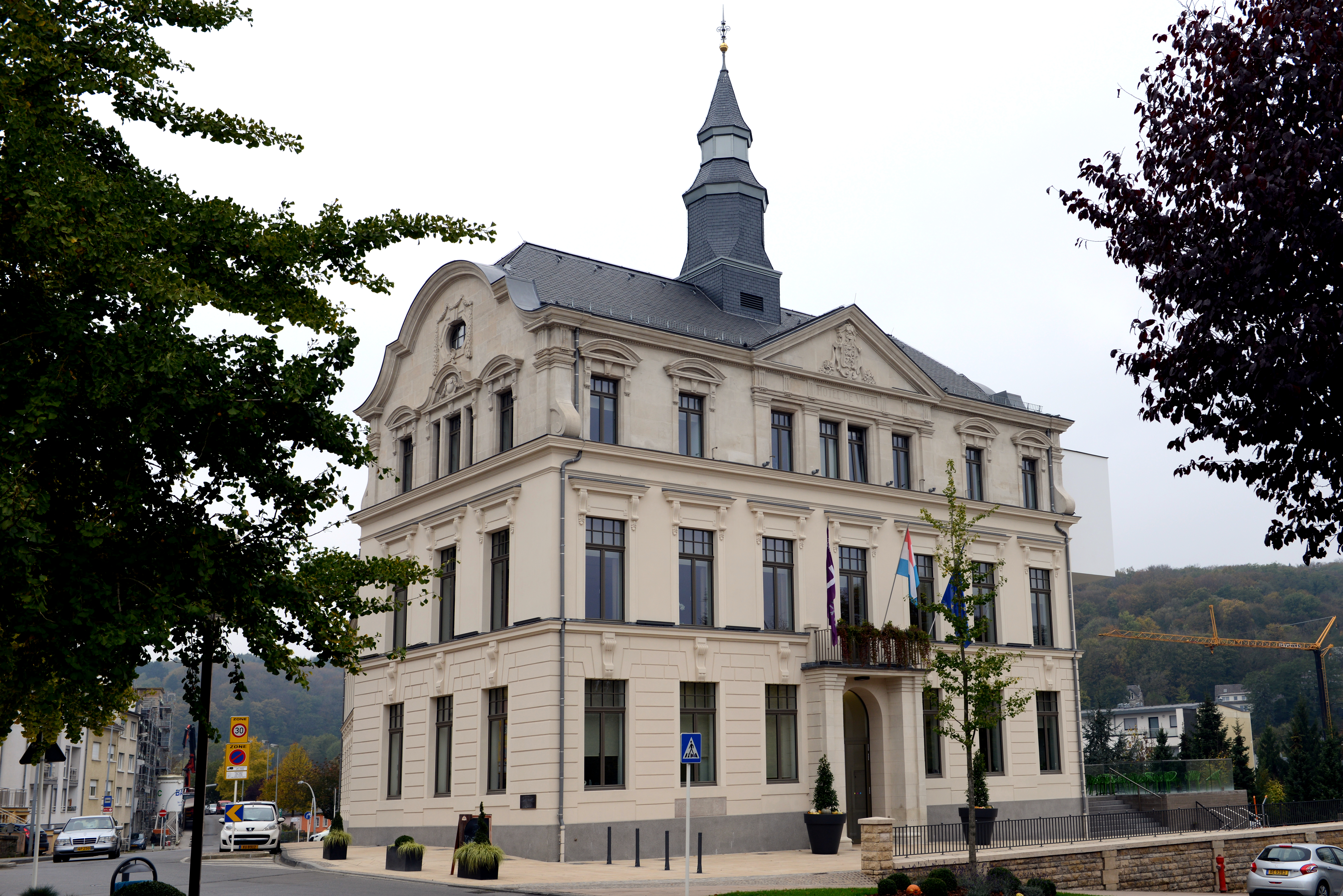
- External view
- Interactive map of Aalt Stadhaus
- Full name: Centre culturel régional Aalt Stadhaus
- Location: 38 Avenue Charlotte; L-4530 Differdange; Luxembourg
- Owner: Ville de Differdange
- Capacity: 201
- Record attendance: 201

Construction
- Opened: 31 January 2014
- Architects: Witry & Witry SA

Website
- www.stadhaus.lu

The Aalt Stadhaus is a concert hall located in Differdange, Luxembourg. Opened on 31 January 2014, it has a maximum capacity of 201 people. It is also the home of the Differdange Music School.

The building was nominated for a Mies van der Rohe Award for architecture in 2014.
