= Furriers' Tower =

Defensive tower in Sighisoara, Romania

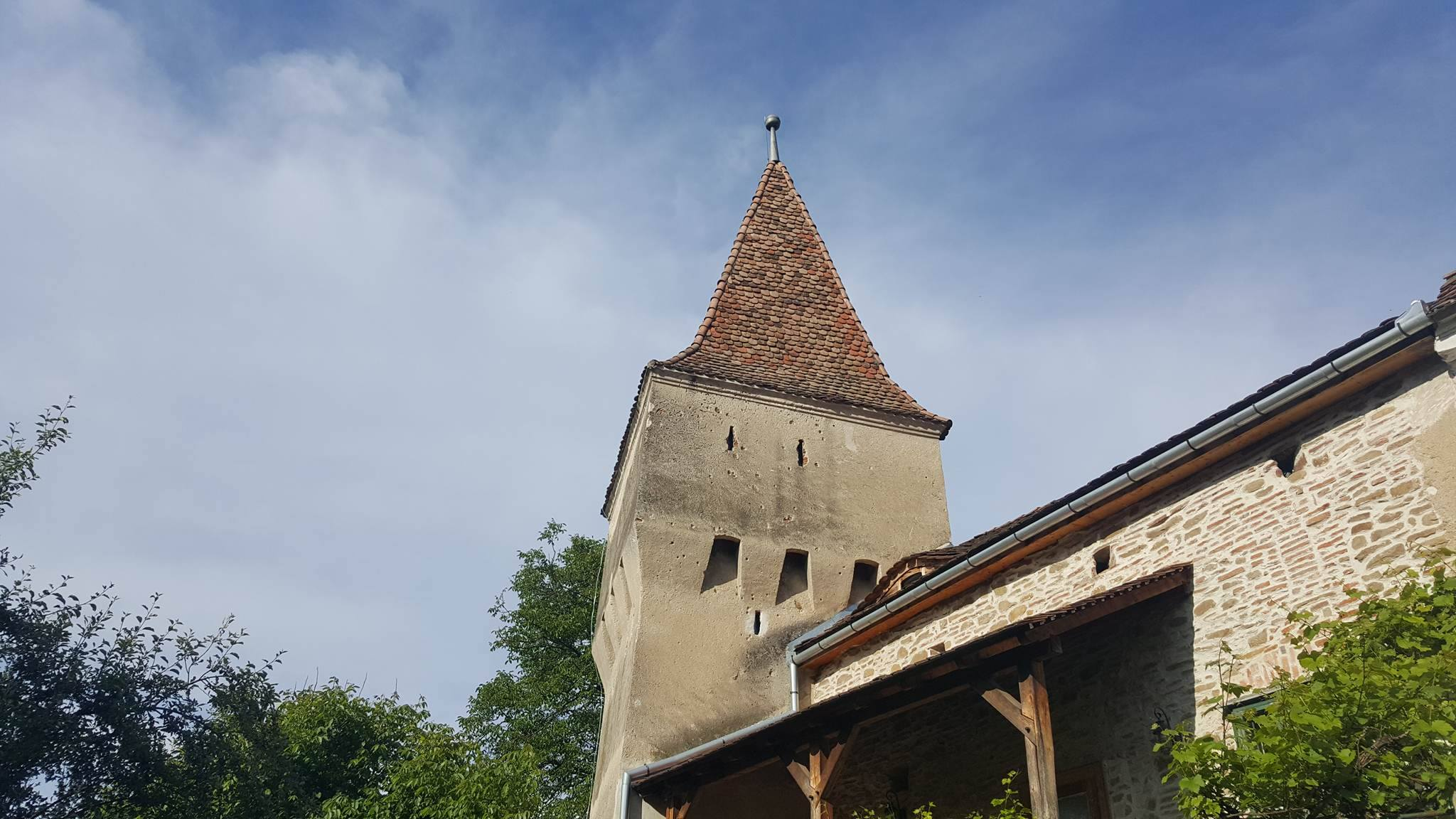
Furriers' Tower

The Furriers' Tower (Romanian: Turnul Cojocarilor, German: Kürschnerturm) together with the Butchers' Tower, Törle gate, and the house underneath forms a grouping typical of the medieval architecture of Sighişoara, Mureș County in Romania.

The tower has a modest size, but is very well proportioned. Its planimetry is square shaped; standing on four smaller levels, the last level widens and is provided with three machicolations (pitch chutes) on each side. The tower was dated early 14th century because of its simple form. Documents dated 1568 mention that the tower was rebuilt that same year: the builders worked 40 days for the body and 36 days for the renovation of the roof. Repairs were also mentioned lateron in 1594 and 1595. The fire of 1676 partly affected the tower and its current shape dates from the big repairs of 1679.

In 1680 several weapons are mentioned as belonging to the tower: two double arquebuses, five simple arquebuses, a small cannon, eight large spears, a halebard, five barrels of gunpowder, a barrel with lead bullets and five cannonballs.
