= Volčji Potok =

- Village
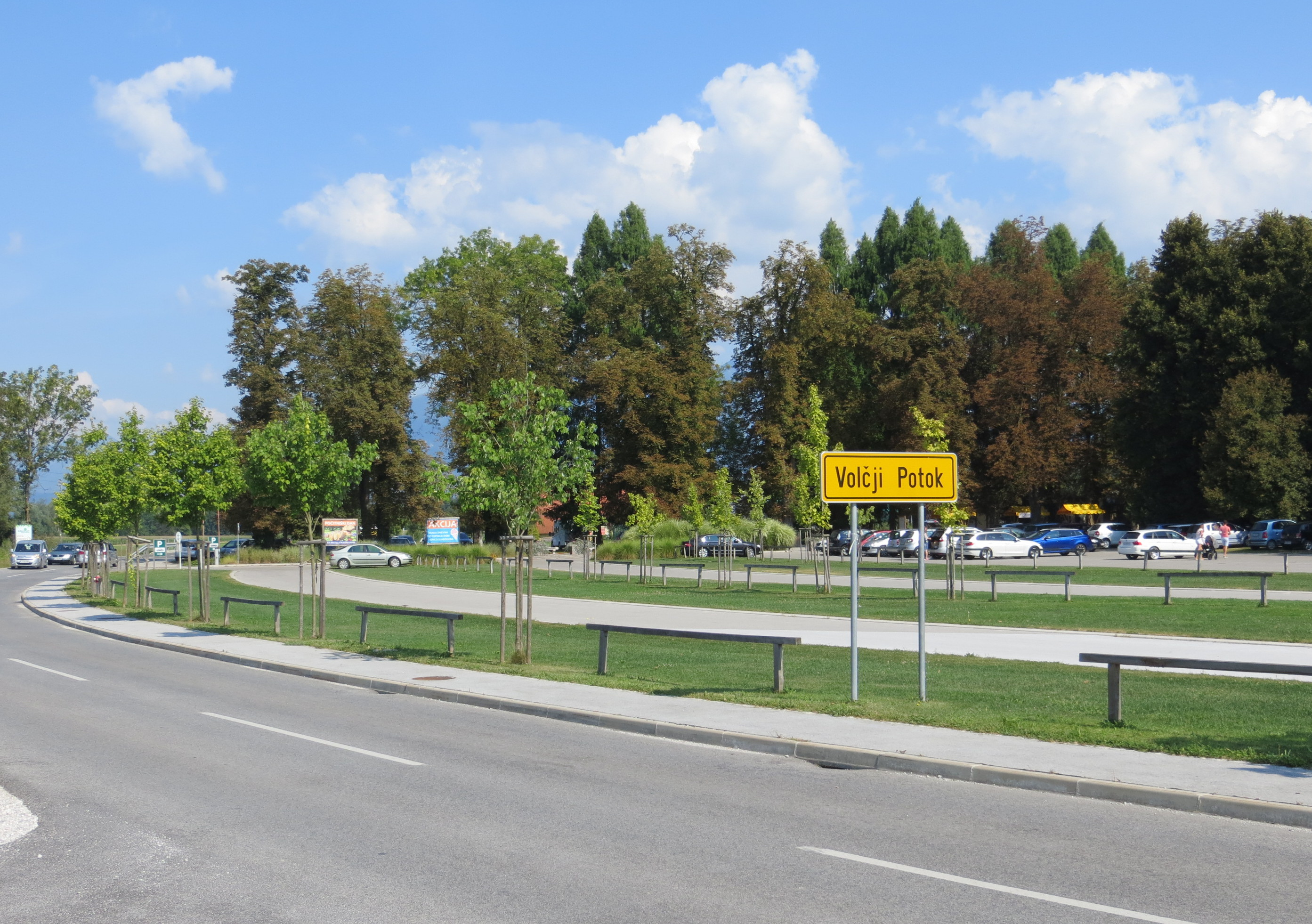

- Location in Slovenia
- Coordinates: 46°11′18.79″N 14°36′31.55″E
- Country: Slovenia
- Traditional region: Upper Carniola
- Statistical region: Central Slovenia
- Municipality: Kamnik

Area
  - Total: 3.66 km^{2} (1.41 sq mi)
- Elevation: 344.9 m (1,132 ft)

Population (2016)
  - Total: 374
  - Density: 102/km^{2} (260/sq mi)
- Time zone: UTC+01 (CET)
  - Summer (DST): UTC+02 (CEST)
- Postal code: 1235 Radomlje

Volčji Potok (pronounced [ˈʋoːu̯tʃji ˈpɔːtɔk]; German: Wolfsbach) is a village on a terrace on the left bank of the Kamnik Bistrica River in the Municipality of Kamnik in the Upper Carniola region of Slovenia.

== History ==
A cell of the first Communist Party in the Kamnik area was established at the Cerar Inn in 1939. During the Second World War, the Partisans broke into the manor in the village on 14 January 1943 and stole a large quantity of food. After the war, much working-class housing was built in Volčji Potok. A catchment basin for local water supply was built below the village in 1967.

== Castle and manor ==
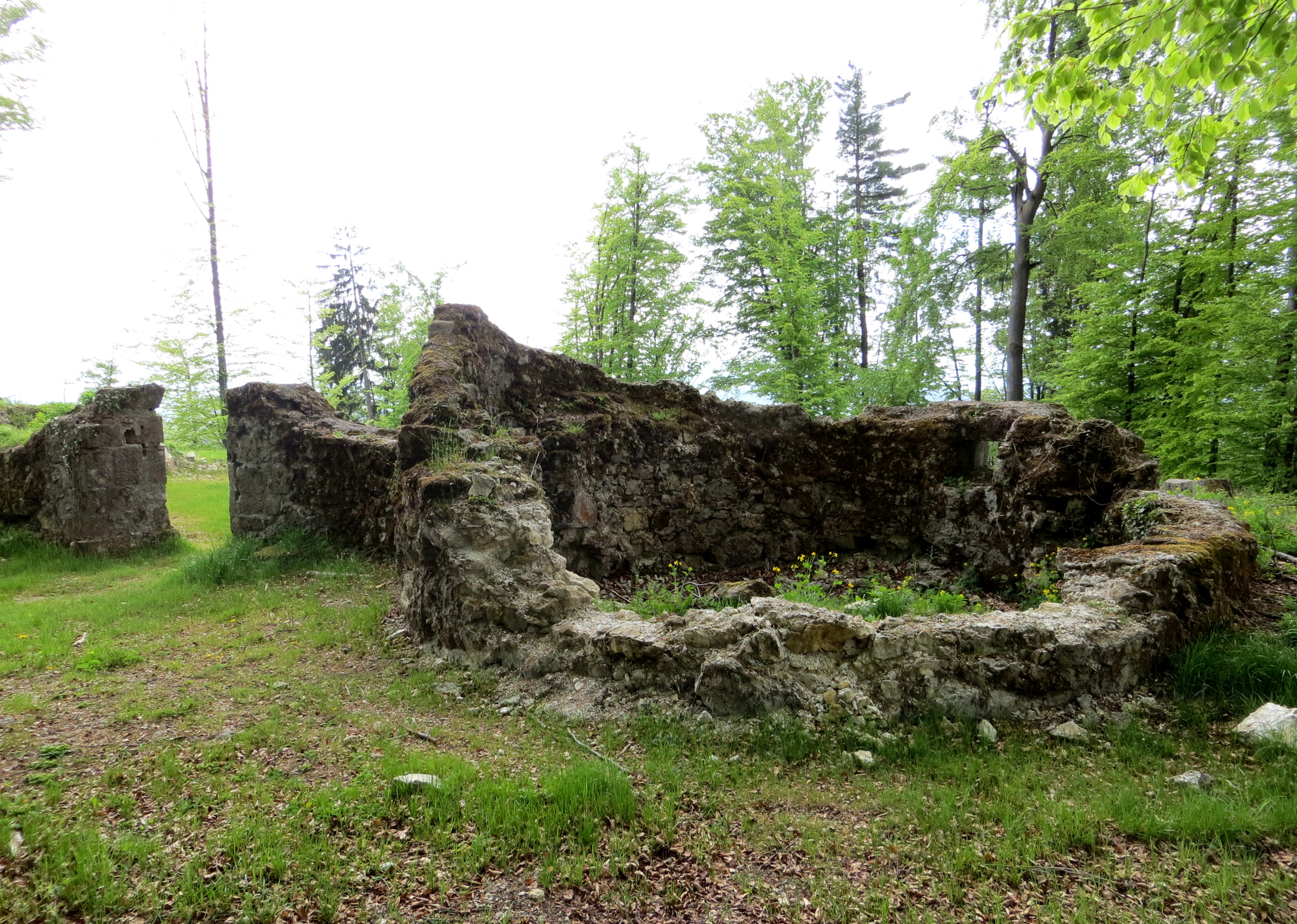
Ruins of Volčji Potok Castle

The overgrown foundations of Volčji Potok Castle (German: Wolfspuchell) stand east of the village on Wolf Hill (Slovene: Volcji hrib). The castle was first mentioned in written sources in 1220, but was already in ruins by the 17th century. Construction of Volčji Potok Manor (German: Wolfsbüchel), which stood below the hill, was begun by the Bonhomo family in the 17th century. The manor was purchased in 1882 by Ferdinand Souvan (1840–1915), who remodeled it and planted the meadow in front of it with trees. This park was expanded to 12 hectares by his son Leon Souvan (1877–1949), who planted it with domestic and exotic trees and surrounded it with a hornbeam hedge. The manor was burned by the Partisans on 13 April 1944. After the war, the ruins of the manor were razed and the manor chapel was converted into a restaurant.

== Arboretum ==
Today, Volčji Potok is best known for its arboretum, the largest and most popular botanical garden in Slovenia. The Volčji Potok Arboretum is open from the beginning of March until the end of November. It was established in 1952 by the University of Ljubljana on what was already a well-established estate with extensive parks around a Baroque mansion that was destroyed in the Second World War.

== Church ==
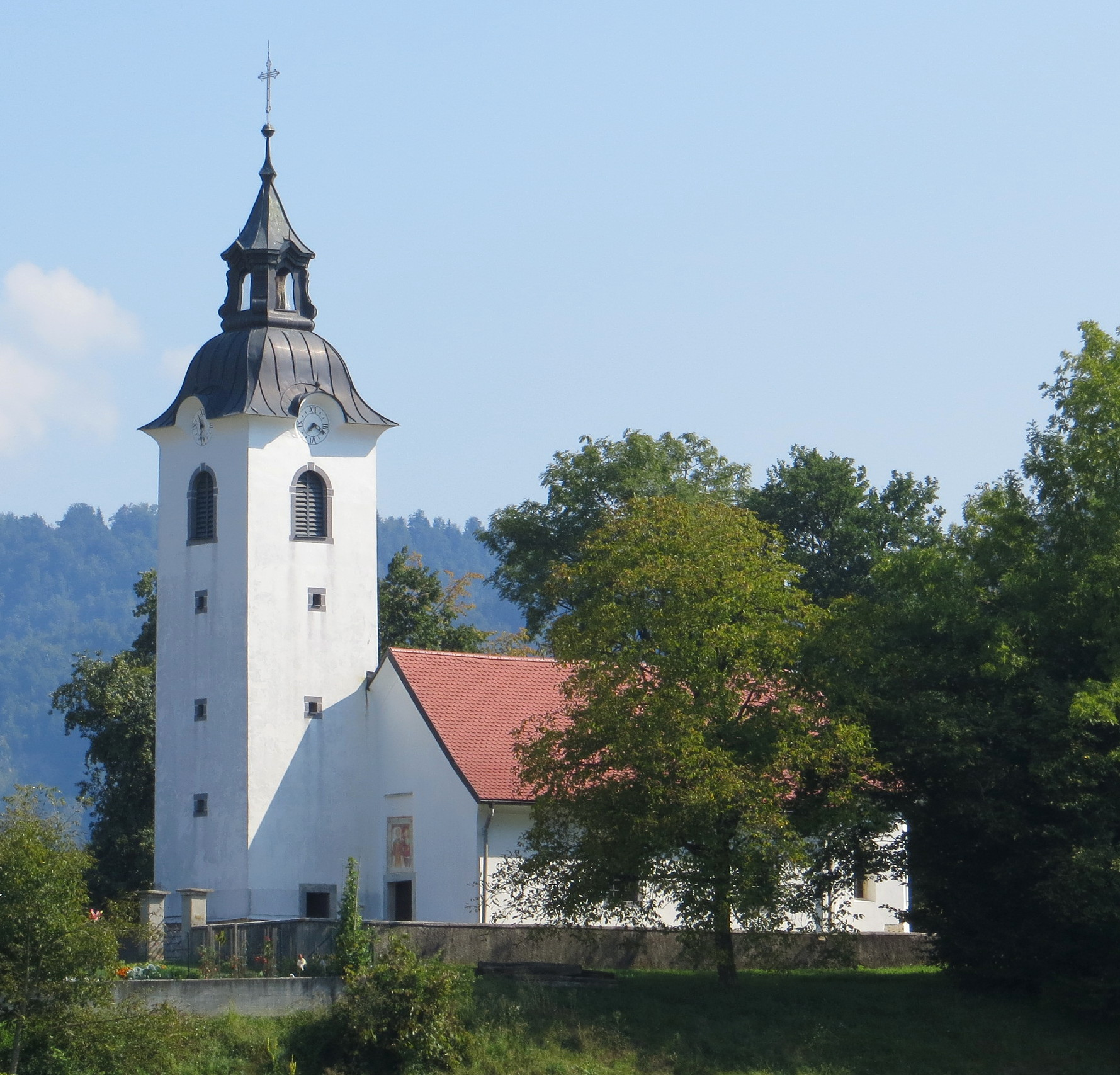
Saint Oswald's Church

The local church is dedicated to Saint Oswald. It features several paintings from Leopold Layer's school. The church was first mentioned in written sources in 1526 and was reworked in the 18th century.

== Notable people ==
Notable people that were born or lived in Volčji Potok include:

- Rudolf Krivic (1887–1983), journalist
