= Klushuis =

Dutch term for a house or flat sold cheaply in exchange for its renovation

A klushuis, which might be translated as 'chore house' ('klus' in Dutch meaning 'chore') is a house or flat that is sold cheaply, in return for which the buyer undertakes to renovate it within a certain time. The buyer must stay in the dwelling for at least two years after it has been refurbished and may not sell or let it. The houses are often sold by local authorities or housing associations which own property in disadvantaged neighbourhoods, as a way of improving or gentrifying the neighbourhood by attracting owner-occupiers from higher social classes.

The idea behind klushuizen is that the buyer invests in his/her own property, and thus also in the neighbourhood. The houses are offered either individually or collectively: in the collective model, a buyers' association is set up to undertake the structural work jointly, after which the finishing is then done on an individual basis.

The concept was developed in Rotterdam in 2005 by the municipality, Urbannerdam consultants and Hulshof architects. Klushuizen can now be found in Amsterdam, Rotterdam, Arnhem and The Hague. The largest such project involves 500 homes in the Kleiburg, one of the hexagonal 'honeycomb' blocks in the Bijlmermeer estate in Amsterdam Zuidoost.

== Professional help ==
The refurbishment of a klushuis requires the buyer to draw up a professional action plan for the local authority’s approval. Some municipalities offer free but mandatory assistance from an architect to help the buyer with this task, including if necessary an application for planning permission. The authority may also, and particularly in collective transactions, insist that a process counsellor be engaged, and may also offer to pay for this.

== Spangen, Rotterdam ==
In the Spangen district of the municipality of Rotterdam, the Wallisblok was a municipal project in which houses were given away 'for free'. This project won the Job Dura Prize in 2006.

== Kleiburg, Amsterdam Zuidoost ==
In 2009, the Rochdale Housing Corporation began relocating the residents of the Kleiburg block in the Bijlmermeer estate, in order to demolish it. After the residents protested, Rochdale agreed to sell the block for the symbolic sum of 1 euro to a third party that would come up with a full renovation plan. The developer chosen was the DeFlat Consortium, composed of KondorWessels Vastgoed, Vireo Vastgoed, Hendriks CPO and Hollands Licht.

The consortium sold the flats at competitive prices, and then renovated the exteriors, after which it was the buyers' turn to decorate and finish the interiors to their own taste. They were allowed a period of one year after completion to have the apartment declared habitable. The buyers could do the work completely by themselves, or hire an external contractor, and the renovation contractor offered discounted packages for this job. Buyers could buy a single flat, or could join neighbouring flats together to make a larger dwelling.

Work on the block was divided into four lots. When 70% of a given lot was irrevocably sold, its renovation was started, and the next lot was prepared for sale. This procedure proved to be a success: the first two lots were sold and renovated in 2013 and 2014, and the third and fourth in the next two years. By Christmas 2014 the DeFlat Consortium was able to announce that the whole block had been saved from demolition. The renovation of the block and the public space around it was completed in December 2016.

This moment marked the end of a 25-year period of demolition or renovation of the honeycomb flats in the Bijlmermeer. The Klein-Kruitberg and Groeneveen blocks were the first to be tackled in 1992, and Kleiburg was the last. The Bijlmer innovation itself as a project will continue for a number of years. Many areas of waste land in the area where flats or garages have been demolished have yet to be rebuilt. The klushuis method proved itself, especially at a time of credit crisis. The Kleiburg flats were some of the most affordable homes in Amsterdam and were sold quickly.

In 2017 the renovation project and the building (as the first in the Netherlands) won the Mies van der Rohe architecture award and the categories Future and Habitat at the Dutch Design Awards.
