= Dušan Ogrin =

Slovenian landscape architect

Dušan Ogrin (14 November 1929 - 20 May 2019) was a Slovenian landscape architect who founded the study of landscape architecture in Slovenia and Croatia. He was professor emeritus at the University of Ljubljana.

== Early life and education ==
Ogrin was born on 14 November 1929 in Skopje, Kingdom of Yugoslavia (today Northern Macedonia). He graduated in 1955 with a degree in horticulture from the Faculty of Agronomy and Horticulture in Ljubljana, the predecessor of the Faculty of Biotechnology.

== Career ==
After graduating, he worked at the Volčji Potok Arboretum until 1957, when he began working as an assistant at the Faculty of Agronomy, Forestry and Veterinary Science. In 1960 he became a lecturer, in 1965 an assistant professor, in 1972 an associate professor and in 1986 a full professor. In 1960, he took over the Chair of Horticulture and Landscape Dendrology (1960) at the then Faculty of Biotechnology as a professor, and transformed it into the Department of Landscape Architecture with a completely new outlook on landscaping. He retired in November 2000 at the age of 70.

== The development of the field and study of landscape architecture ==
Professor Dušan Ogrin pioneered the field of landscaping. He paved the way for landscape architecture in Slovenia both in the field of education and in the field of practical professional work, and his theoretical thought also set milestones on a global scale. He placed landscape architecture, which is intertwined between nature and culture, firmly on the cultural side, professionally grounded and within a philosophical framework. In his theoretical and practical works, based on his knowledge of the laws and processes of nature, he established the essence of landscape architecture, defining it as a multifaceted, spatial, functional and mythological entity that has always sought to express man's place in the universe, his departure from nature and his position in society.

In 1972, he introduced a postgraduate course and in 1976 a bachelor's degree in landscape architecture in Ljubljana. Before that, in 1968, he had studied landscape design in Zagreb. In designing the study of landscape architecture in Slovenia, he took as a starting point the specific social needs in spatial planning and the protection of landscape heritage. The separation of the study of landscape architecture from landscape dendrology was the result of a thoughtful study of university programs around the world, which he upgraded and improved in many respects for his studies at the University of Ljubljana, an assessment of the domestic situation, and the high standards and goals he set. He founded and headed the Chair of Landscape Planning and Design, ontologically separated it from horticulture and developed it with his colleagues into a department. He worked most closely with his colleague Ivan Marušič and, in developing the study of landscape architecture through design and planning perspectives on landscaping, paved the way for the professional development of landscape architecture in Slovenia. They pointed out that good spatial planning is that which is capable of reconciling conflicting interests and finding the best possible path for spatial development. They stressed the importance of optimisation - weighing up alternatives for spatial development. It is in the pursuit of democratic decision-making on the use of space that they made their greatest contribution. Under the ideas of Dušan Ogrin and Janez Marušič, landscape architecture developed into a profession that, in the dynamics of development and protection, adequately addresses the issues of spatial and social restructuring.

== Pedagogy ==
Ogrin founded and directed the study of landscape architecture at the University of Ljubljana, expanded the staff of lecturers and assistants, taught studio courses (Urban Landscape Planning, Landscape Design, Cultural Landscape Protection) and theoretical courses (Theory and Development of Landscape Design, and many others).

He lectured at 29 universities in Europe, the USA, Canada and Asia. He was a visiting professor at Cornell University, Utah State University, University of Illinois Urbana-Champaign, Louisiana State University, University of Arizona, University of California, Berkeley), Pomona College, Seattle (Washington), Athens (Georgia), Madison (Wisconsin), Amherst (Massachusetts) and Charlottesville (Virginia) in the USA, Peking University, Montreal (Canada), Ås (Norway), Haifa (Israel), Sheffield (UK) and Hanover (Germany). He was a visiting lecturer at Harvard University ten times between 1983 and 1992.

He mentored students in their preparation of bachelor's and master's theses. During his 43 years of teaching at the Faculty of Biotechnics (1957-2000), he mentored 46 bachelor's theses out of a total of 120 graduates, three of which were awarded the faculty's Prešeren Award, as well as 11 master's theses, out of a total of 120 graduates.

== Scientific and professional work ==
At the very beginning of the professional development of landscape architecture in Slovenia, between 1969 and 1972, Ogrin organised five international conferences, which raised issues of landscape architecture and spatial planning that are still relevant today.

In 1972, he organised the world's first symposiums on landscape planning in Ljubljana, which is still recognised by the world's professional community as his greatest merit. The symposium, entitled Landscape Planning/Landschaftsplanung, took place from 29 to 31 August 1972 and was attended by 12 invited speakers from Yugoslavia, Europe, the United States and Israel, including Carl Steinitz, Ruth Enis, Sven Ingvar Andersson and Meto Vroom. Steinitz is still associated with the Ljubljana School and is also an honorary doctor of the University of Ljubljana (2007).

The second, more prominent conference was organised by Dušan Ogrin in 1992 under the title "Concepts in Landscape Architecture", as one of the initiators of the European Conference of Landscape Architectural Schools (ECLAS).

Other internationally renowned conferences were the International Conference on Urban Landscape in 1988, which was also attended by the American landscape architect Lawrence Halprin, and the Conference on Nature Conservation Outside Protected Areas in 1996.

Ogrin devoted the bulk of his many years of research to the garden, or rather to the world's garden and architectural heritage. In 1993, on the basis of this research, he published The World Heritage of Gardens in Slovenian, which was simultaneously published in English by Thames & Hudson, and shortly thereafter in Italian by Fenice (1995). With this book, he sought to understand the garden in all its functional aspects and shades of meaning. As he was also an expert on plants and natural processes, he succeeded in looking at the garden beyond the established art-historical criteria. He was concerned with the development of a specialist language in Slovenian, and it is with this book that he defined its vocabulary. He built on this in his last work, Landscape Architecture (2010), a Slovenian textbook in which he laid down the foundations of the profession and outlined its mission. All his monographs are accompanied by his photographs of landscapes.

Ogrin held several leading positions in the professional field: he was a member of the International Federation of Landscape Architects (IFLA) board of directors, chairman of the International Union for Conservation of Nature (IUCN) landscape planning committee, founded the Association of Landscape Architects of Yugoslavia (UPAJ) and was its first president, and remained an active member of the Association of Landscape Architects of Slovenia until the end of his career.

In the 1980s, he participated in the drafting of spatial planning legislation; in the 1990s, he participated in the formulation of the Spatial Development Strategy of the Republic of Slovenia and prepared Guidelines for the Management of Exceptional Landscapes (1998), and published Exceptional Landscapes of Slovenia (1999), which describes the concept of an exceptional landscape and the meaning of the term both in Slovenia and internationally. He also worked to develop a professional journal. He designed and edited first the journal Pejsaž in prostor (1970), and in the years (2004-2010) the journal Landscape 21. He was a member of the editorial board of two international landscape architecture journals, Landscape Journal and Landscape and Urban Planning.

== Prizes and awards ==
Ogrin always complemented his theoretical research work with practice, and during his extensive career won numerous awards in public landscape architecture competitions. Among these, his projects for the cemeteries in Nova Gorica (Stara Gora), Ptuj and Novo mesto (Srebrniče) stand out in particular. In addition to various developments in Slovenia, in later years he also realised some of his ideas for the design of green urban space in Croatia.

His design works include 45 landscape-architectural plans for parks, open spaces of public buildings, squares, schoolyards, cemeteries, residential areas (landscape design of the Ruski Tsar neighbourhood and the Štepanj settlement in Ljubljana, 1969) and others.

In addition to numerous awards for landscape design competition projects, Professor Ogrin received several national and international awards for his work. Among them are the Peter-Joseph Lenné Gold Medal awarded by the Goethe Foundation Basel (1975), the Silver Honorary Medal of Freedom of the President of the Republic of Slovenia (1997) and the first Lifetime Achievement Award of the European Council of Schools of Landscape Architecture (ECLAS) in 2009. In Slovenia, he received three Plečnik Awards; the first in 1976 for his pioneering pedagogical work and methodological contribution in the field of cultural landscape planning and design, the second following the publication of the book The World Heritage of Gardens in 1994, and the third in 2001 for the Srebrniče cemetery near Novo mesto

In 1971, he received the BIO award for the design of the first information booklet for the study of Landscaping. In 2002, the Association of Landscape Architects of Slovenia awarded him the Lifetime Achievement Award, and in the same year he was also appointed Professor Emeritus at the University of Ljubljana.

The most important of them all is certainly the Sckell Ring of Honour, an award given to him in 1995 by the Bavarian Academy of Fine Arts in Munich for his outstanding achievement in the history of garden art and the theory of landscape architecture. At the award ceremony, in his lecture 'Is Garden Art Really Art?' (Ist Gartenkust tatsächlich Kunst?), he placed the garden at the centre of the developing field of landscape architecture. He was interested in the garden as a tangible object, but even more so as an idea that stands at the very beginning of the long journey of landscape design as the central field of landscape architecture.

== Later life ==
He died on 20 May 2019 in Ljubljana.

== Major works ==
- Landscape planning - conference proceedings
- Greenery in the Urban Environment - Symposium Proceedings
- Grass in Public Greenery - Symposium Proceedings
- Roads and Landscape - Seminar Proceedings
- Srebrniče - design of a cemetery
- Catalogue of works: planning, research, pedagogy, publications - monograph
- Expansion of the Tivoli City Park, 1993 (published in the monograph Catalogue of Works)
- Landscape design of the Ruski Car neighbourhood, Ljubljana, 1969 (published in the monograph Catalogue of works)
- Slovenian Landscapes - monograph
- The World Heritage of Gardens - monograph
- Landscape Architecture - monograph
- Greenery in the Athenian Kingdom - a contribution or a utopia (article in Architecture: Journal of Architecture, Urban Planning and Applied Arts pp. 66-73, Zagreb)
- Ljubljana's green system - the conceptual role of urban greenery (research report)
- Editorial in the monograph Historical Parks and Gardens in Slovenia - The Significance of the Slovene Landscape Architectural Heritage
