= Siegfried Nassuth =

Dutch architect (1922–2005)

Georg Siegfried Nassuth (20 July 1922, Pekalongan, Dutch East Indies - 5 April 2005, Amsterdam) was a Dutch architect, best known as the architect of the Bijlmermeer (officially known as Amsterdam Zuidoost).

He attended the Delft University of Technology. After receiving his engineer's degree, Nassuth began working as an urban planner in the municipality of Amsterdam.

In 1962 Nassuth became project manager of a team which was planning the Bijlmermeer. When planning the Bijlmermeer, Nassuth was inspired by the Congrès International d'Architecture Moderne, particularly Le Corbusier.

Nassuth remained involved in the planning of the Bijlmermeer until his retirement in 1981. The project won him the 1998 Ouvreprijs (award of Stichting Fonds voor Beeldende kunsten, Vormgeving en Bouwkunst).
