= Volčji Potok Arboretum =

Arboretum in Slovenia

Coordinates: 46°11′10.13″N 14°36′23.48″E

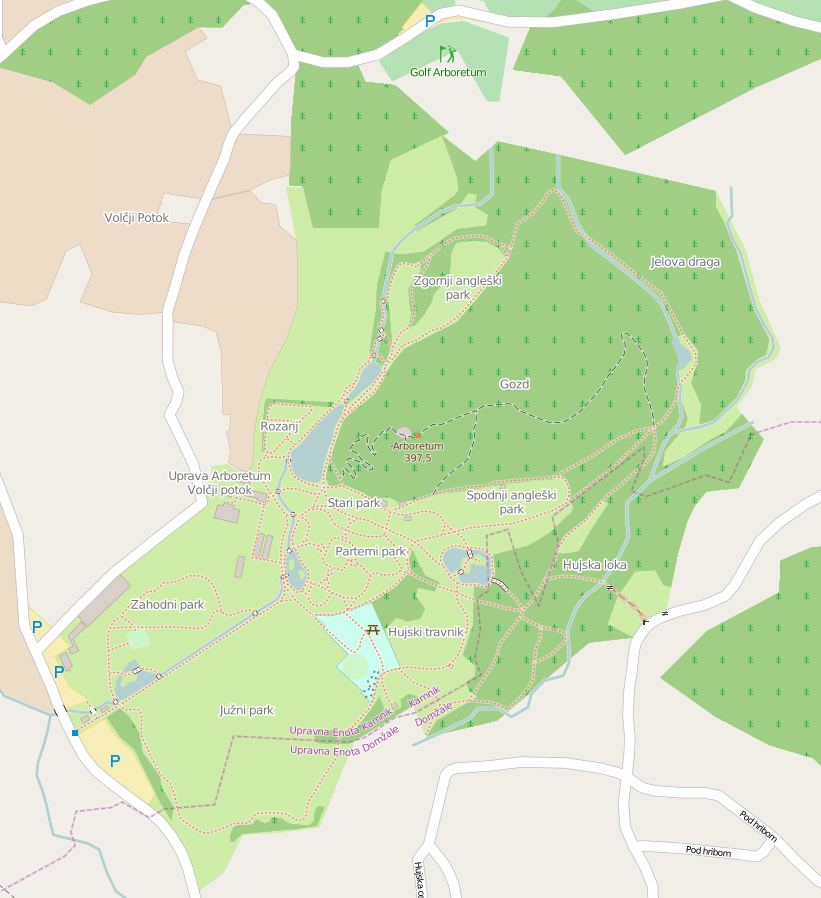
Map of the Arboretum

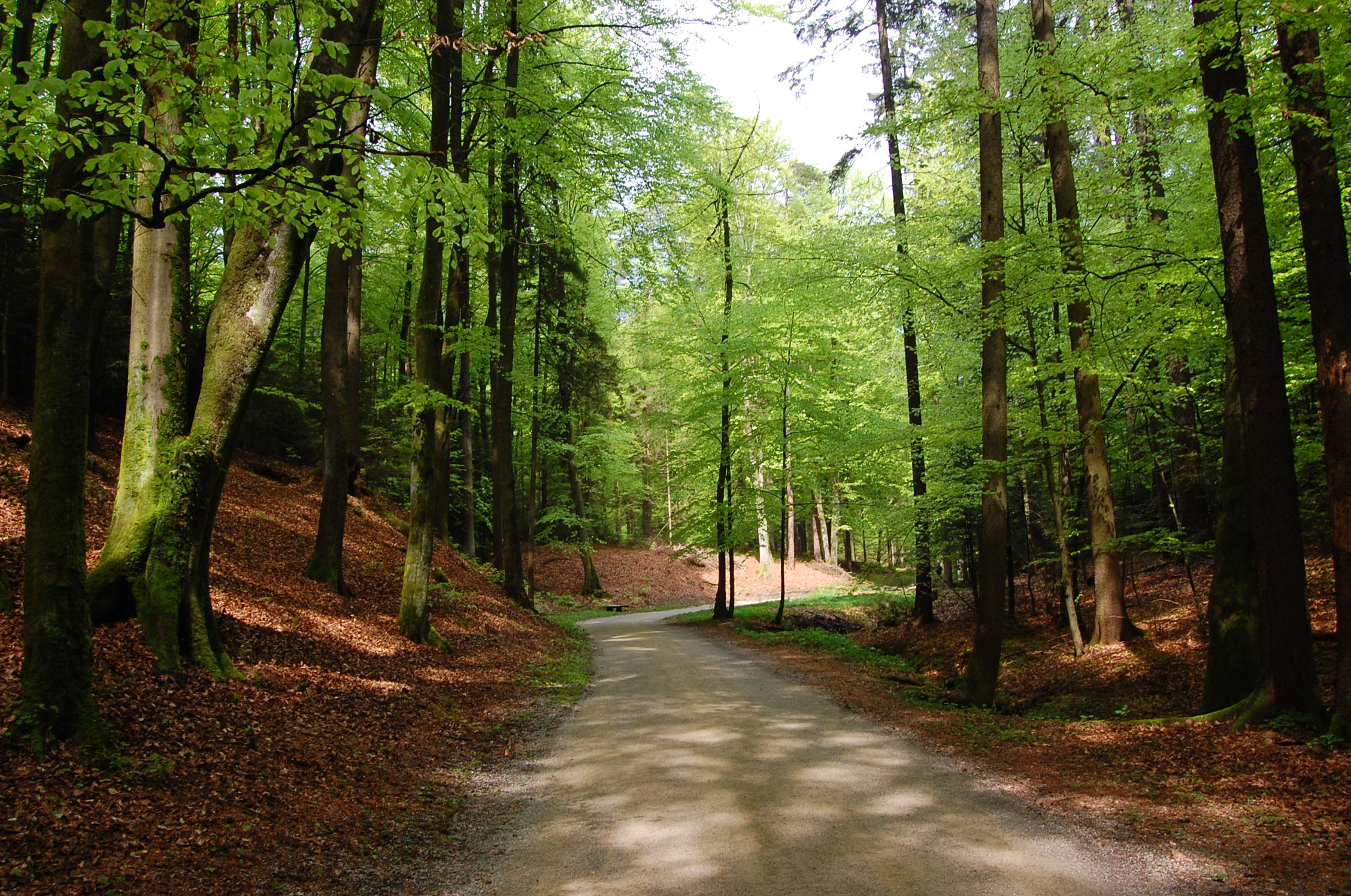
Forest in the arboretum

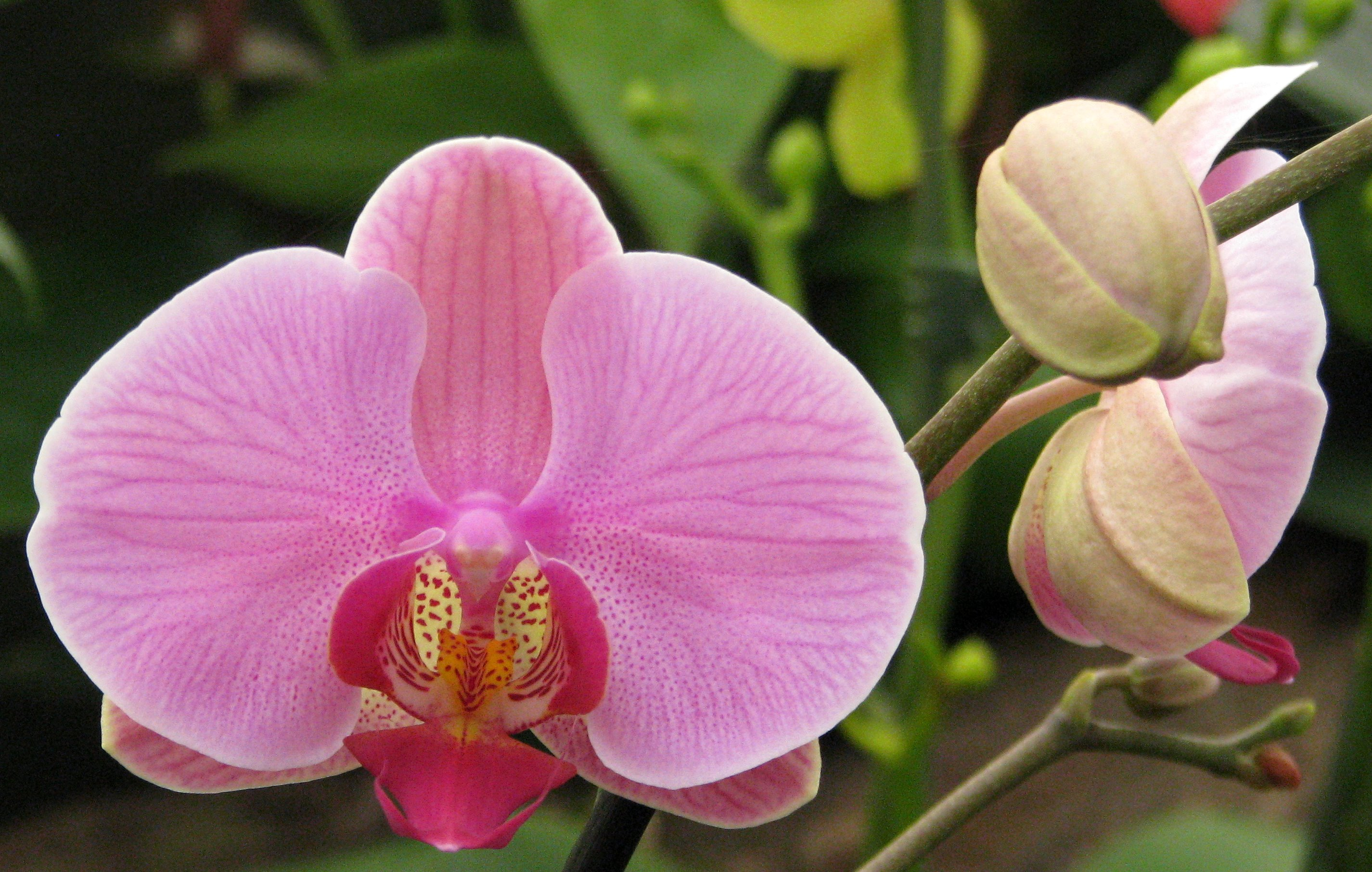
Orchids in the arboretum collection

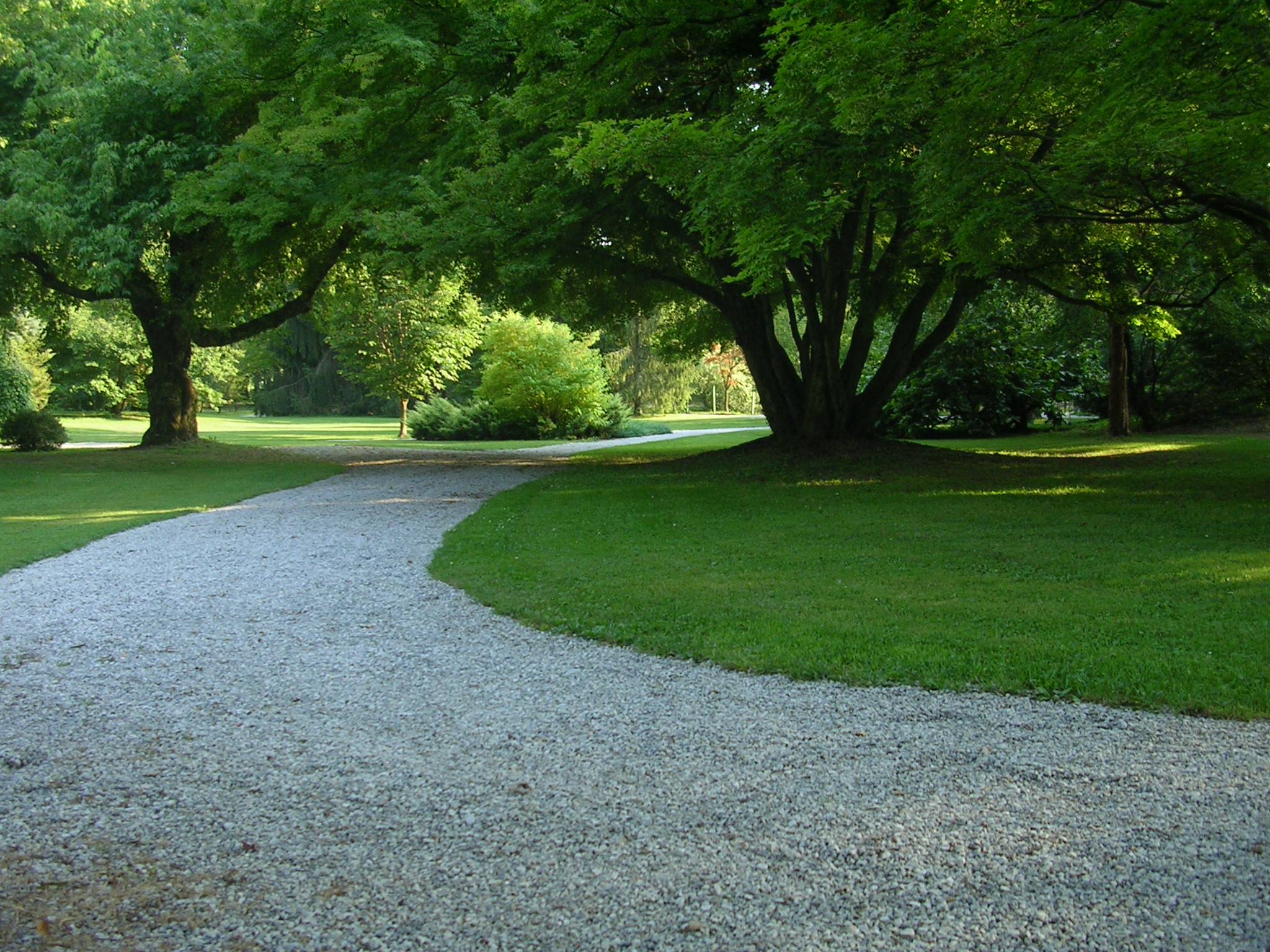
Path in the arboretum

The Volčji Potok Arboretum was opened to the public in 1952. It originally formed part of the Souvan family estate in 1885, which was taken over by the University of Ljubljana in 1952 and legally declared a place of cultural and natural heritage of national importance. Now independent of the university, it is the most visited botanical garden in Slovenia and in recent years has become well known for its spring flower shows. The arboretum is primarily a botanical garden for woody plants, the only one in Slovenia.

== History ==
The Volčji Potok estate, located near Kamnik, was already mentioned by Valvasor in the 17th century. The picture printed in his book presents the old castle at the top of the hill (first mentioned in 1220) as being already in ruins, and the newest mansion at the foot of the hill, built by Bonhomo family.

The estate changed owners several times; the Bonhomo family was followed by the Burger family, then the Gozani family, and in 1882 it came into the ownership of Ferdinand Souvan. He rebuilt the mansion in 1885 and planted a park encircled by walls. His son Leon Souvan enlarged the park by pulling down the walls and planted around 12 hectares with domestic and exotic trees. In place of the demolished walls he planted a beech tree hedge at the south and southwest edge. The park was a venue for Slovene impressionists, including Matija Jama. The 300-year-old mansion was plundered and burned by the Partisans on 15 April 1944. After Leon Souvan died, the park came under the management of the Faculty of Agriculture and Forestry in 1952, today the Biotechnical faculty, University of Ljubljana. The collaboration with the university ended in 1965.

The arboretum was financially independent between 1965 and 1999 and has therefore shifted to manufacturing and services. Since 1999 it has been under the management of the Slovene Ministry of Culture.

== Mission ==
The Volčji Potok Arboretum institute, established in 2003, manages the arboretum. It is responsible for expanding the park and garden culture in Slovenia, as well as for other cultural state-owned monuments of cultivated nature. It cooperates with similar institutions worldwide. The professional staff evaluations and develops the arboretum collection.

== Estate ==
The original entrance tree avenue from the 19th century is continuous with the central part of the park and is geometrically formed in a French style. Other parts are in English style. The geometrical park, designed in 1918 by Leo Souvan, stood front of the mansion. The park leads up to the old park in the immediate vicinity of the former mansion. Two stone tables are surrounded by two horse chestnut trees and two plane trees, all originating in the 19th century.

A hill overgrown with forest and an archaeological site at the top forms a background to the plantation at the north. At the top of the hill there are ruins of pentagonal Romanesque residential tower, originating in the 13th century, and of walled a castle courtyard with a Renaissance bastille at the entrance from the 16th century.

The arboretum produces plants in its own nurseries, runs a garden centre, employs a group of landscape architects, and does practical landscaping all over Slovenia. The arboretum itself comprises 88 hectares of ground with a diversity of soil types, occupied by about 2,500 different species of trees and shrubs. The plant collection has been designed as a landscape park. The park includes five artificial lakes and 30 hectares of forest, which houses a particularly important union of fir and three-lobed moss (Bazzania trilobata).

== Collections ==
Trees and bushes belong to the basic botanical species from Europe, North America, and Asia as well as to cultivars that have been raised for ornamental purposes. The richest collections of species are maple, linden trees, birch and beech. There is also a collection of cultivars of fan-maple (Acer palmatum), scaly conifers, rhododendrons, and roses, and a collection of evergreen deciduous trees.

In 2003 and 2004 an interactive herbarium was established online. The collection consists of selected non-native and native woody plants from the arboretum.

The park gallery, renovated in 1991 by the architect Andrej Kemer and designer Miljenko Licul, exhibits Janez Boljka's collection of animal statues. On the ground floor there is a hall for receptions and wedding ceremonies.

It hosts various cultural events and exhibitions; for example, the exhibition of Minimundus models, which also presented a model of Bled Castle for the first time in 2010.
