= Srebrniče =

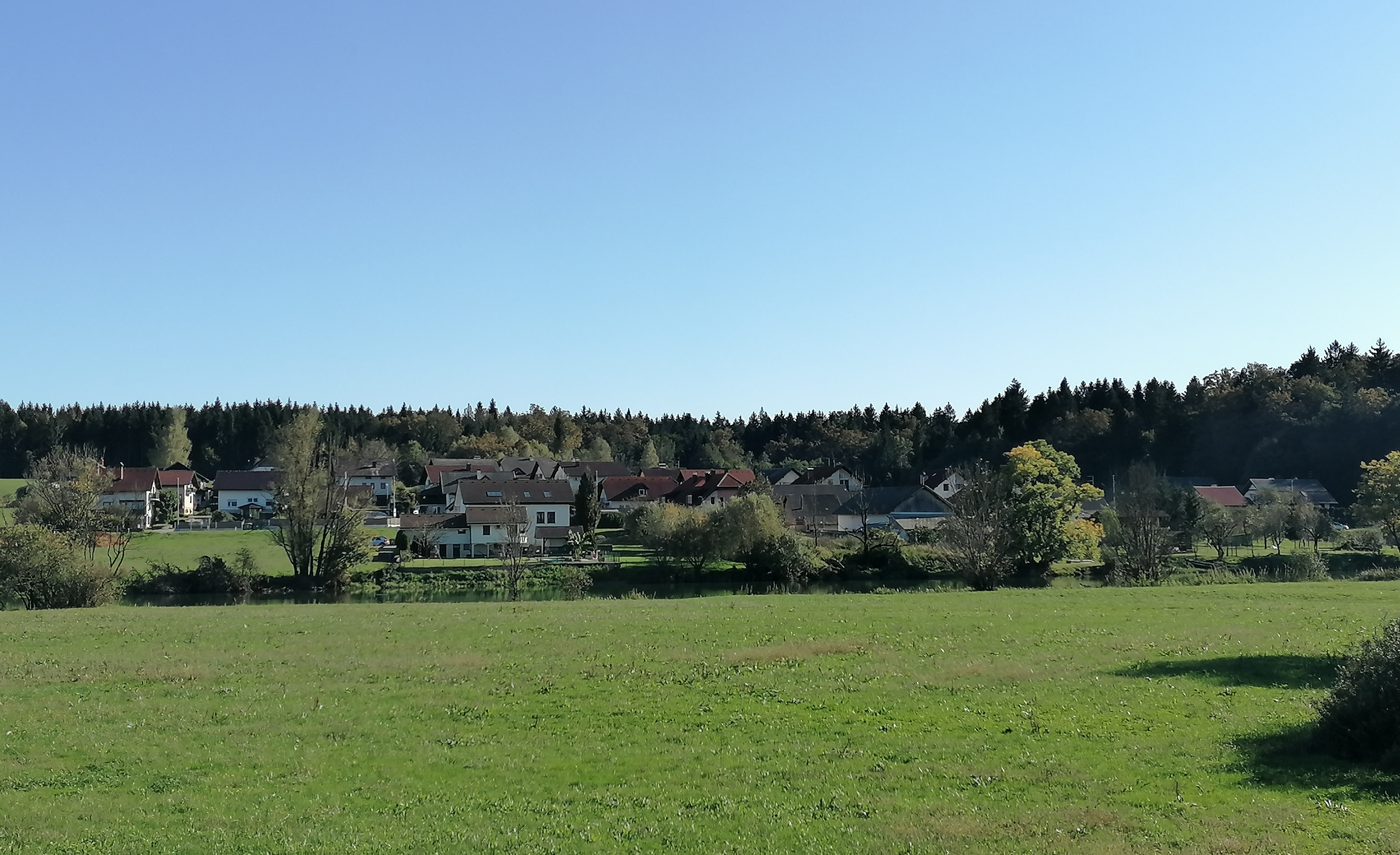

- Location in Slovenia
- Coordinates: 45°47′34.06″N 15°7′30.51″E
- Country: Slovenia
- Traditional region: Lower Carniola
- Statistical region: Southeast Slovenia
- Municipality: Novo Mesto

Area
  - Total: 1.467 km^{2} (0.566 sq mi)
- Elevation: 169.6 m (556 ft)

Population (2026)
  - Total: 97
  - Density: 66/km^{2} (170/sq mi)
- Postal code: 8000

Srebrniče (pronounced [ˈsɾeːbəɾnitʃɛ]) is a settlement on the right bank of the Krka River west of Novo Mesto in southeastern Slovenia. The area is part of the traditional region of Lower Carniola and is now included in the Southeast Slovenia Statistical Region. In January 2026, the population was 97.

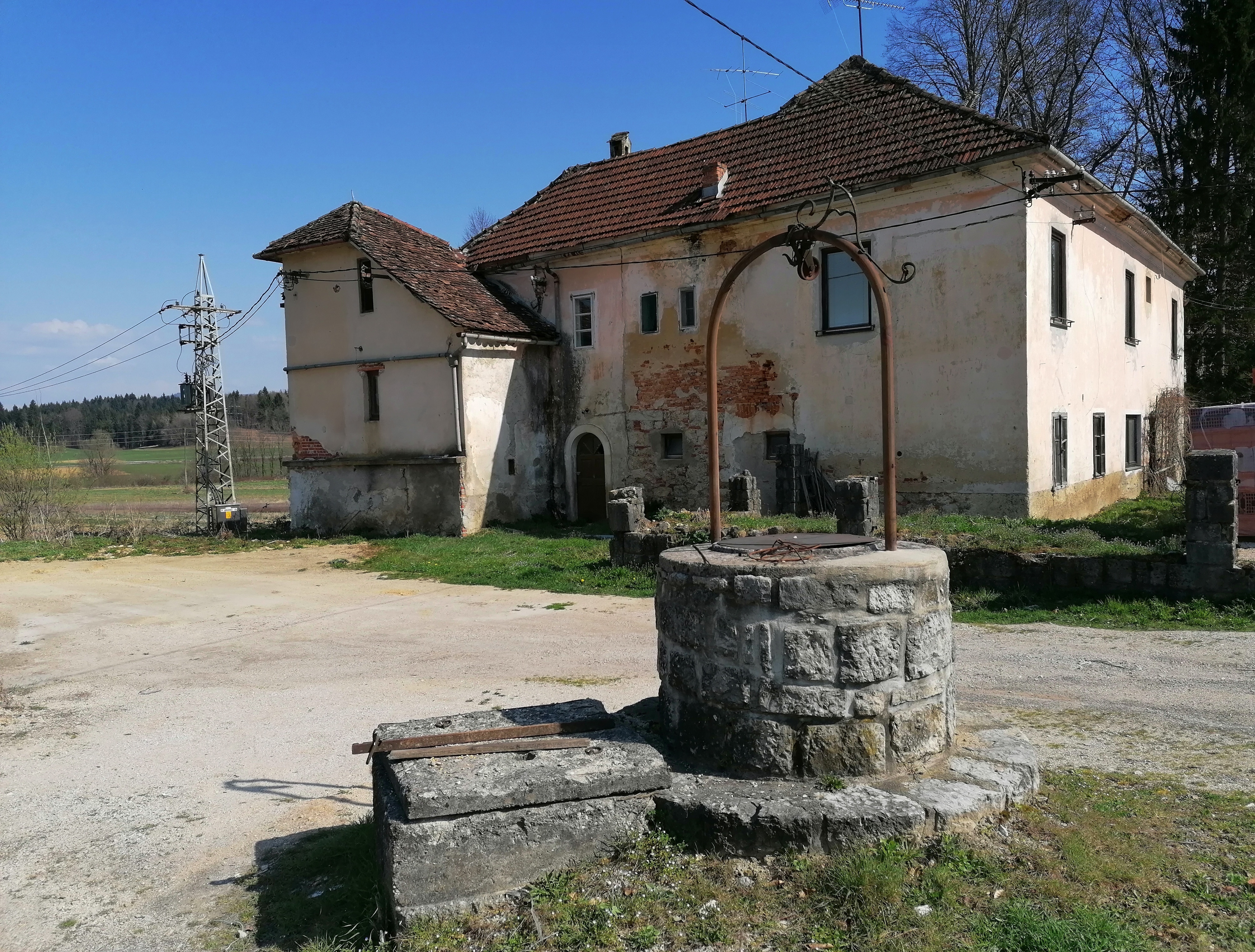
Srebrniče Mansion (Silberbau)

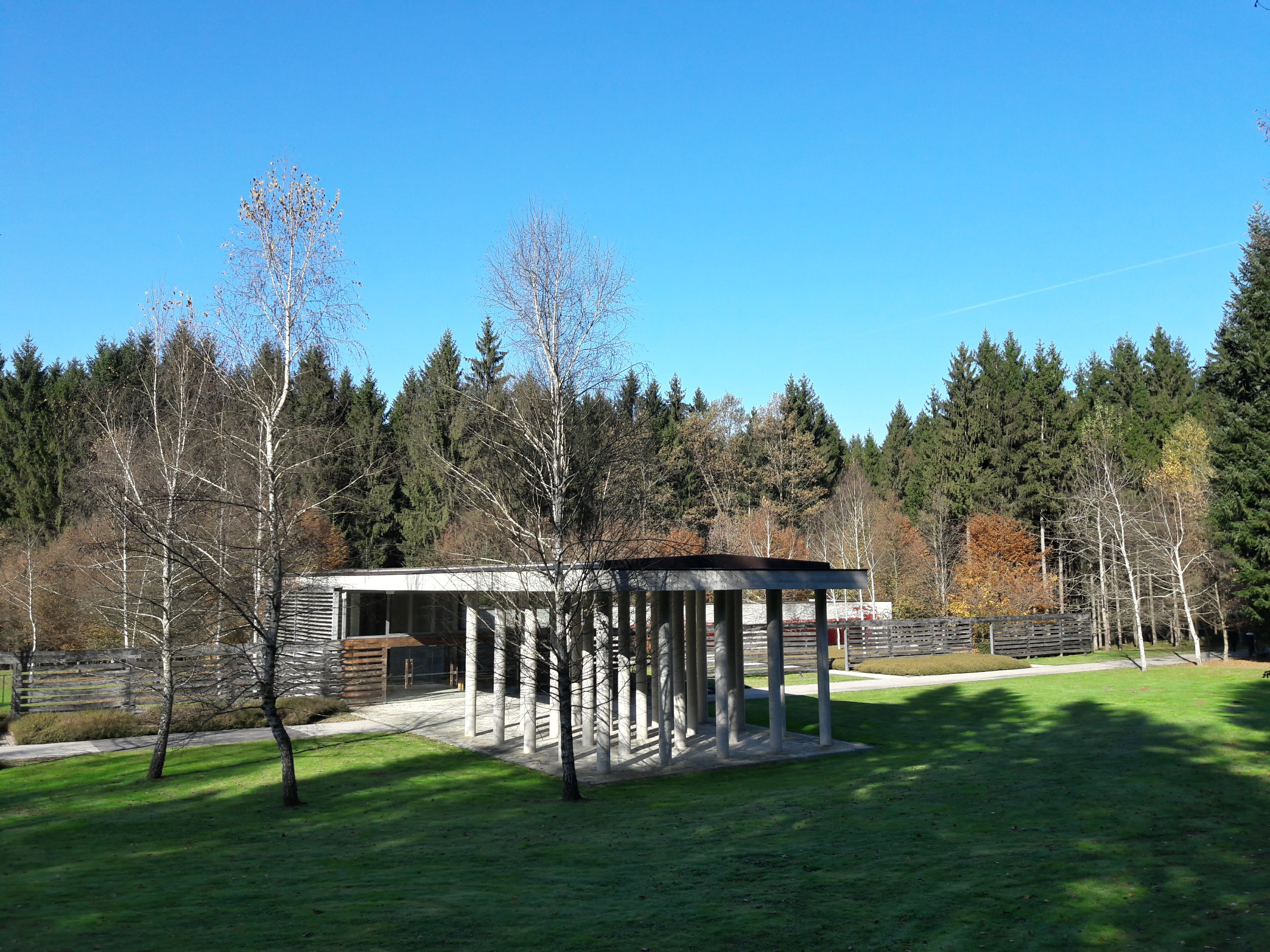
Srebrniče Cemetery
