= Francisco González de Canales =

Spanish architect (born 1976)

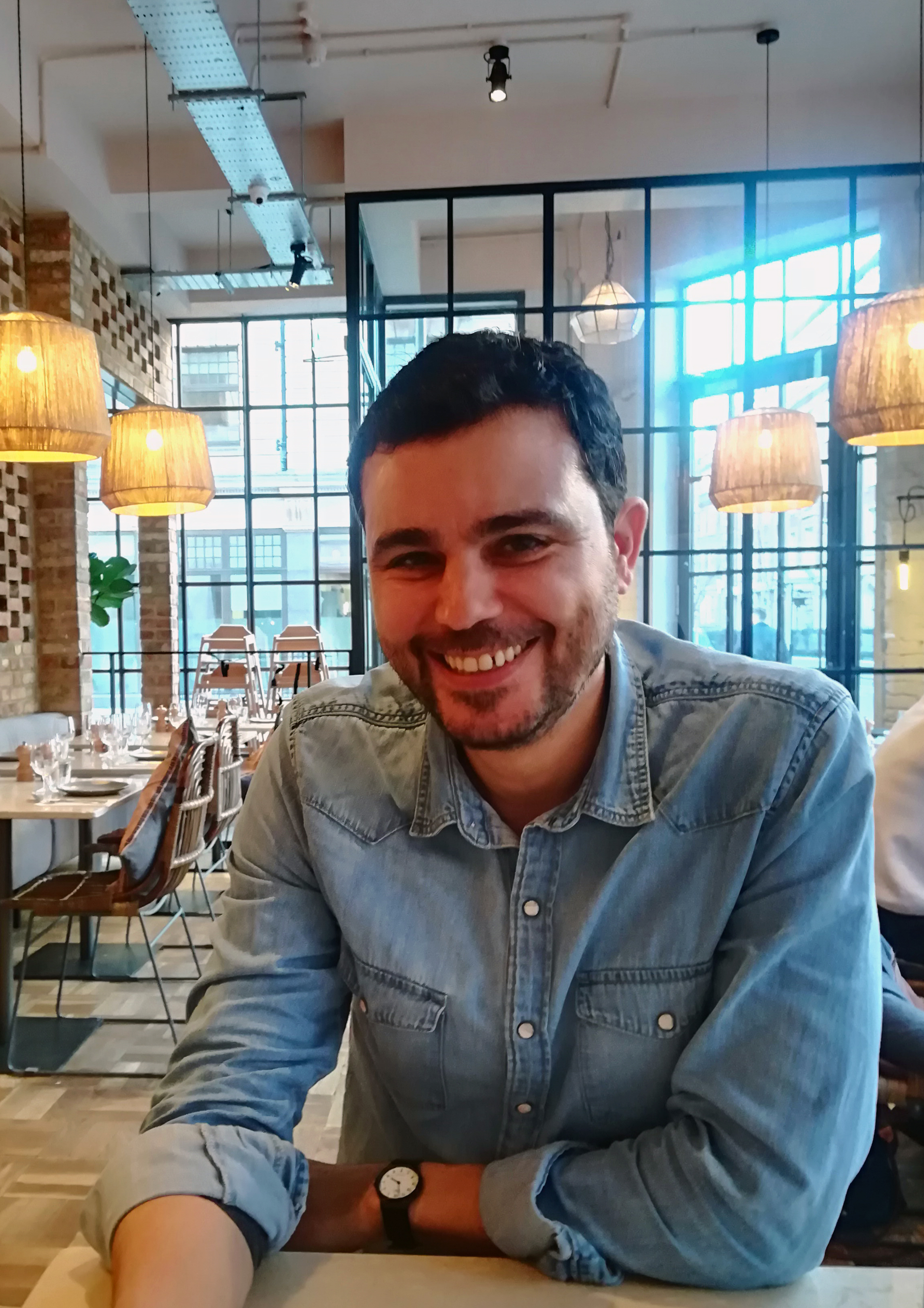
- Born: 1976 (age 49–50); Seville
- Occupation: Architect
- Awards: Build's Annual Architecture Awards 2020
- Buildings: Restoration of the Palace and gardens of the Enriquez de Ribera family, Bornos,
- Projects: Bicentennial Multipurpose Building, San Salvador

Francisco González de Canales (born November 24,1976, Seville) is a Spanish architect, professor, critic, and poet educated in Seville, Barcelona, and Harvard.

Professor of architectural composition at the University of Seville, throughout his career he won several international awards such as the Build's Architecture Award 2020. He has developed his academic work at the Architectural Association School of Architecture in London and other leading institutions. He is the author of several books and academic publications on modern and contemporary architecture. He is renowned for his work on 20th-century architecture, particularly the work of Rafael Moneo, as well as his criticism of contemporary architecture. He is a founding partner of the architectural firm Canales Lombardero.

== Education and academic development ==
González de Canales graduated as an architect in 2001, after receiving a scholarship to study at the Escuela Técnica Superior de Arquitectura (ETSA) in Barcelona (Universidad Politécnica de Cataluña). He completed his master's studies at Harvard University having been awarded the scholarships from the Research Staff Training (FPI) and La Caixa-Fulbright. At Harvard, in 2007, González de Canales obtained the Master in Design with the number 1 of his class, and receiving the Dimitris Pikionis award. He received his PhD in the same year from the University of Seville.

The architect has been a visiting professor and researcher at several academic institutions. Since 2008 he has been a regular guest lecturer at the Architectural Association School of Architecture in London, has also taught at the Boston Architectural College, the Instituto Tecnológico de Monterrey, and the City University of London. He has been a researcher at the Catholic University of Valparaíso, the University of Cambridge (Jesus College) and the Institute of Aesthetic Research of the Universidad Nacional Autónoma de México (UNAM), and The Warburg Institute at the University of London.

Following his years at Harvard, where he was an assistant professor at the Harvard University Graduate School of Design (2005-2007), he completed his academic career at the University of Seville. He became associate professor in 2002, full professor in 2012 and acceded to the chair of architectural composition in 2019. He was the editor of the journal Neutra of the Seville College of Architects (2002-2006) and coordinator of the public program of the Architectural Association of London (2008–2012).

== Career ==
Between 2005 and 2008 he worked for Rafael Moneo in Cambridge, Massachusetts; and for Norman Foster in London. In 2003 he partnered with Nuria Álvarez Lombardero to create the architectural firm Canales Lombardero. The studio received several awards and has published its work in international magazines.

As a promoter of contemporary architecture, he has played an outstanding role in the direction and curatorship of some international exhibitions. It is remarkable the traveling exhibition "Rafael Moneo. A Theoretical Reflection from the Profession", which was shown in La Coruña, Lisbon, Mexico City, Hong Kong and Madrid, Thyssen Museum. In 2026, he organised, together with Professor Mario Carpo, the international symposium The Inevitability of Mannerism.

== Featured projects ==
- Marcory House, Abidjan, Ivory Coast, 2015–2025
- Restoration of the palace and gardens of the Enriquez de Ribera family, Bornos, 2018 - Hispania Nostra Award 2018.
- Perea Borobio House, Seville, 2017- Architects Magazine Awards 2017, finalist,listed in La Casa de la Arquitectura
- Bicentennial Multipurpose Building, San Salvador, 2017- winning project.
- Casa Priego Lagares, Córdoba, 2011- XI Félix Hernández Awards, finalist.
- Medical office in Almonaster la Real, Huelva, 2007 - Premios Colegio de Arquitectos de Huelva 2007 (mention), listed in La Casa de la Arquitectura

== Publications ==
With more than fifty publications in specialized international journals, he has been editor, coauthor and author of several books:

- First Works: Emergent Architectural Practices of the 1960s and 1970s (2009, with Brett Steele),
- Experiments With Life Itself (2013),
- Rafael Moneo: A Theoretical Reflection from the Profession. Archival Materials 1961-2013 (2015, editor),
- Rafael Moneo: Building, Teaching, Writing (2015, with Nicholas Ray)
- Politics and Digital Fabrication: An Ongoing Debate (2016, with Nuria Álvarez Lombardero)
- El arquitecto como trabajador (2018)
- Consideraciones sobre la obra de Rafael Moneo (2019, editor)
- El Manierismo y su ahora (2020), COAS 2021 award in the architecture publications" category.
- Lecturas sobre Aldo Rossi (2022, editor)
- The Mannerist mind. An architecture of crisis (2023)
- Aldo Rossi, hoy. Conversaciones ibéricas (2024)
- Ambigüedad operativa (2024). 17th Spanish Architecture and Urban Planning Biennial Award (2025)

As a poet, he has published the book Aerología (Abades Editores 2017). Prologued by Félix Duque, it reflects feelings and stitches of his life between two cities, in a nonstop trip between clouds and absences; and Dos (Olé Libros, 2025), a story told from inside the body.

== Awards ==
- 17th Spanish Architecture and Urban Planning Biennial Award, 2025
- COAS Architecture and Society Award 2021.
- XV Spanish Biennial of Architecture and Urbanism, finalist
- CICA Julius Posener Exhibition Catalogue Award 2020
- Build's Annual Architecture Awards 2020
- Hispana Nostra Award, 2018
- Award of the XIV Spanish Biennial of Architecture and Urbanism (XIV BEAU).
- Award of the XIII Biennial of Spanish Architecture 2016 (XIII BEAU)
- CICA Bruno Zevi Book Award 2014
- Malaga Architecture Awards, modality Promotion of Architecture, 2009
- Dimitris Pikionis Award, 2007
