= Rafael Moneo =

Spanish architect (born 1937)

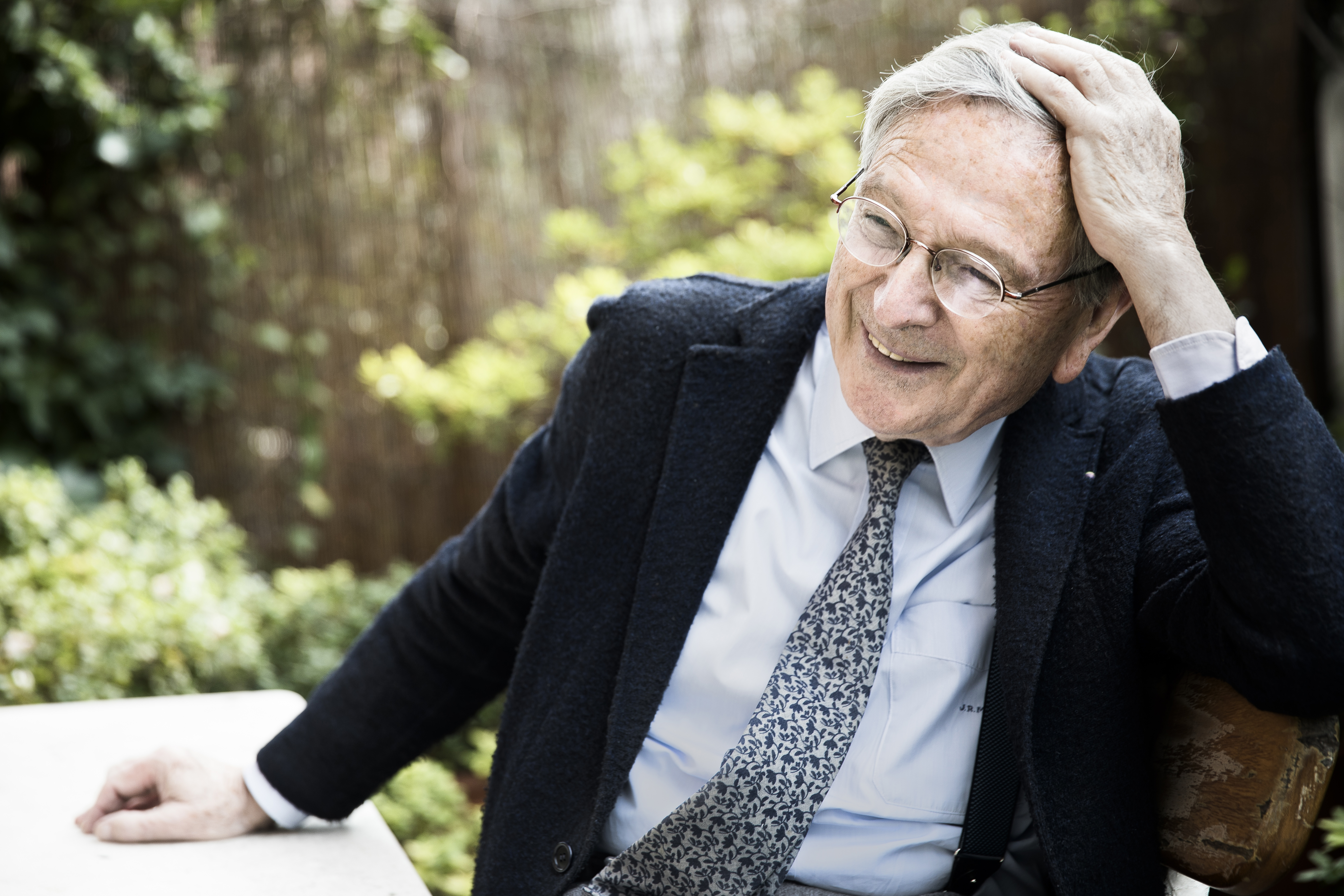
- Born: José Rafael Moneo Vallés; 9 May 1937 (age 89); Tudela, Navarre, Spain
- Occupation: Architect
- Awards: Rolf Schock Prizes in Visual Arts (1993); Pritzker Architecture Prize (1996); Thomas Jefferson Medal in Architecture (2012)

José Rafael Moneo Vallés (born 9 May 1937) is a Spanish architect. He won the Pritzker Prize for architecture in 1996, the RIBA Royal Gold Medal in 2003, and La Biennale's Golden Lion in 2021.

== Biography ==
Born in Tudela, Spain, Moneo studied at the ETSAM, Technical University of Madrid (UPM) from which he received his architectural degree in 1961.

Moneo designed in Spain the National Museum of Roman Art in Mérida, and the Town Hall of Murcia. In the United States, Moneo designed the Davis Art Museum at Wellesley College in Massachusetts and the Audrey Jones Beck Building (an expansion of the Museum of Fine Arts, Houston). He also designed the Chace Center, a new building for the Rhode Island School of Design. In December 2010, the Northwest Corner Building (formerly the Interdepartmental Science Building) at Columbia University in New York City first opened.

Moneo's most recent work is Peretsman-Scully Hall and the Princeton Neuroscience Institute, which houses the psychology and neuroscience departments at Princeton University and opened in December 2013.

In 2012, Moneo was awarded with the 2012 Prince of Asturias Award for the Arts. According to the jury, Moneo is "a Spanish architect of universal scope whose work enriches urban spaces with an architecture that is serene and meticulous. An acknowledged master in both the academic and professional field, Moneo leaves his own mark on each of his creations by making them a weird modern type of building at the same time as combining aesthetics with functionality, especially in the airy interiors that act as impeccable settings for great works of culture and the spirit."

Moneo's work has been shown in several international exhibitions including "Rafael Moneo. A Theoretical Reflection from the Profession" whose curator was his disciple, Francisco González de Canales.

== Gallery ==
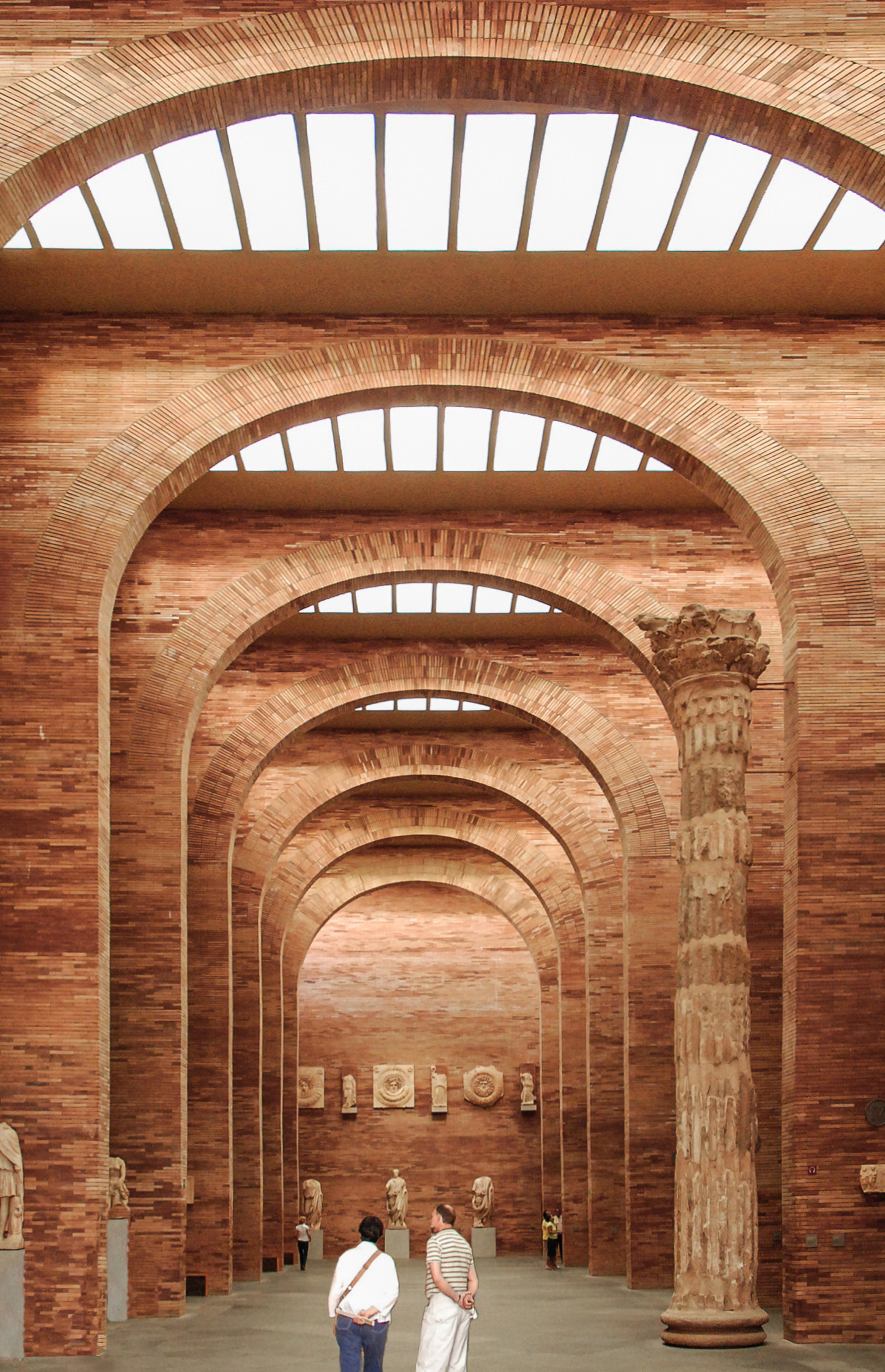
National Museum of Roman Art, Mérida, Spain

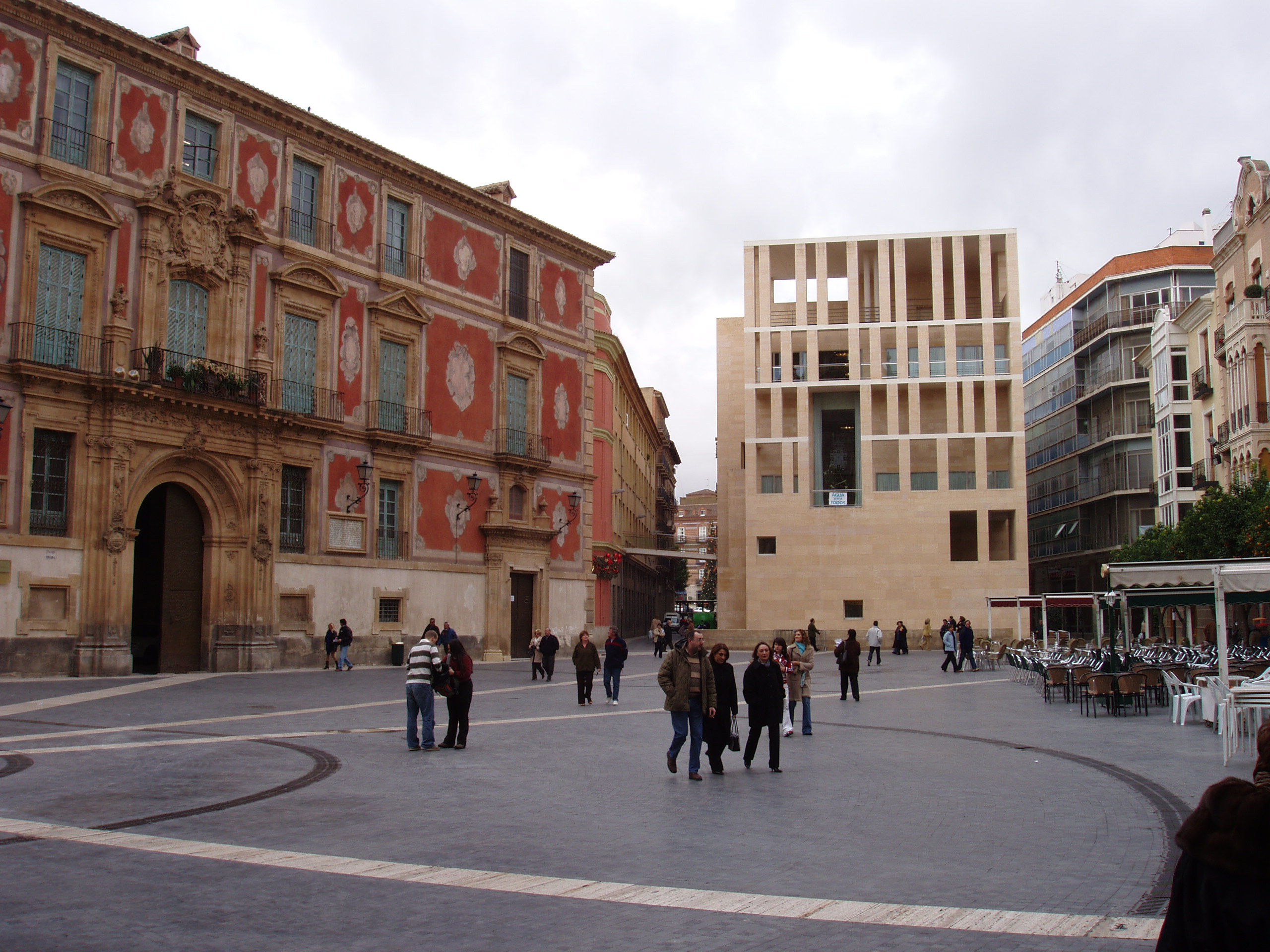
Murcia Town Hall on the Cardenal Belluga Plaza

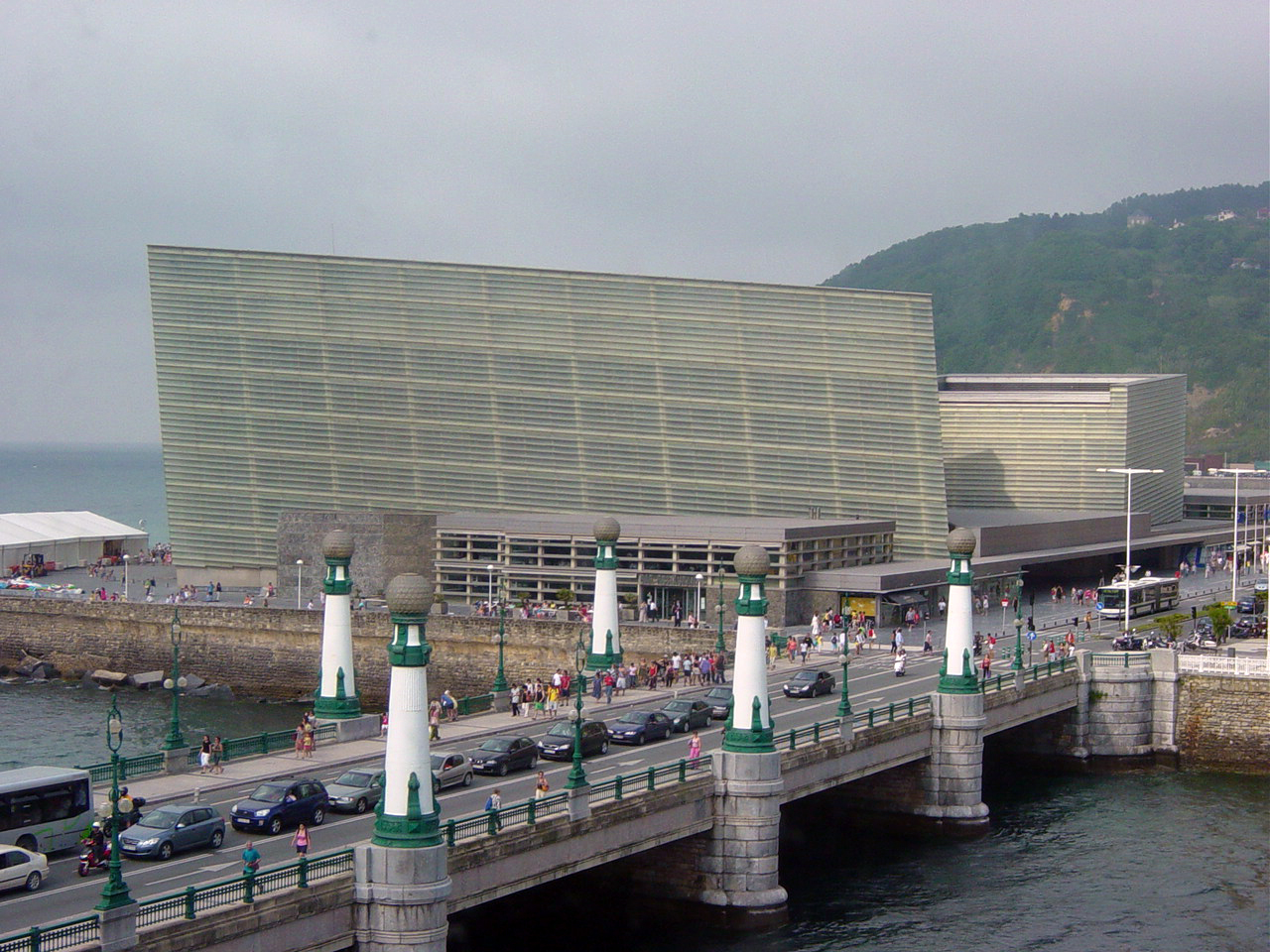
Kursaal Palace in San Sebastián (Spain)

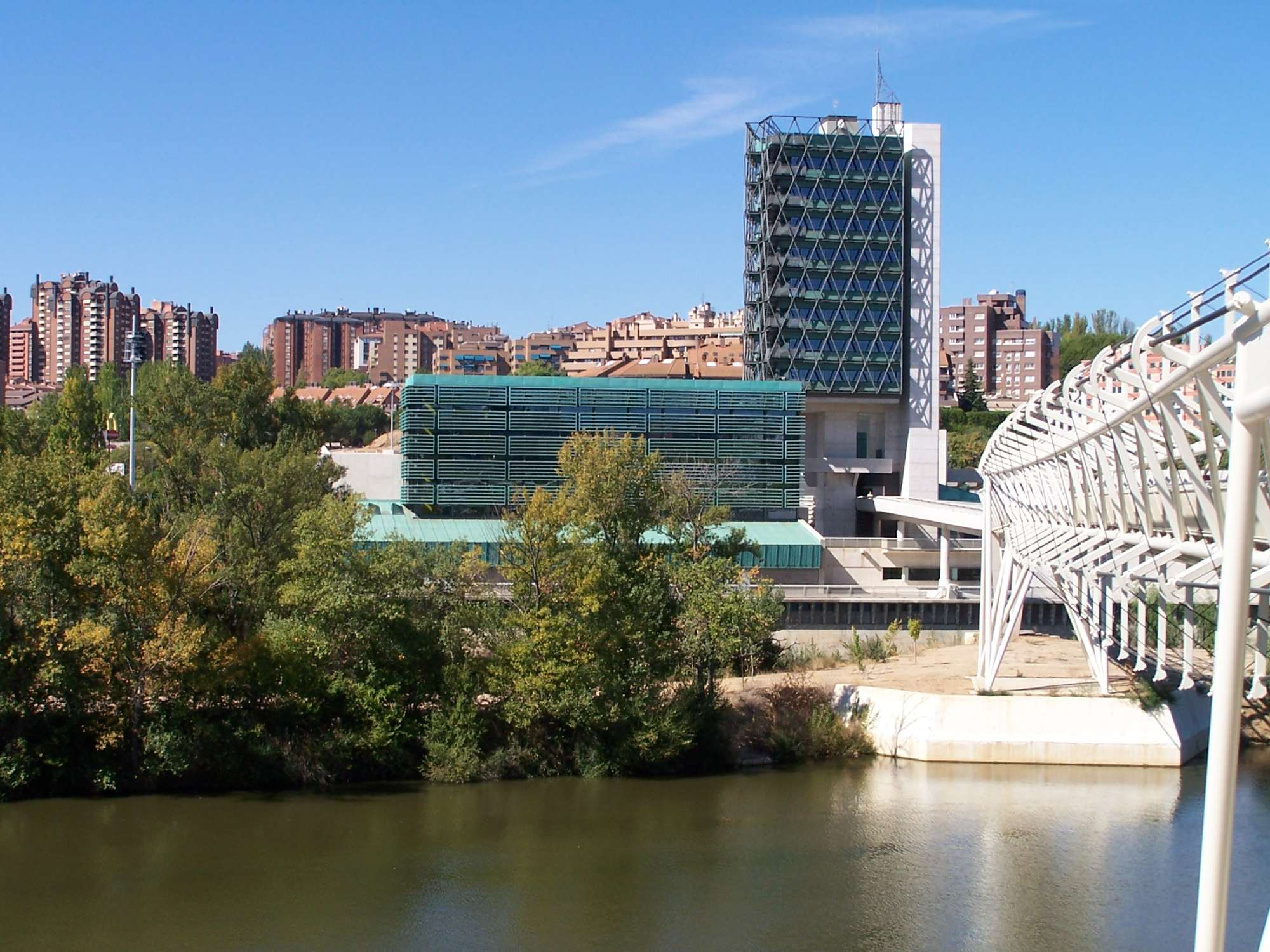
Valladolid Science Museum, Spain

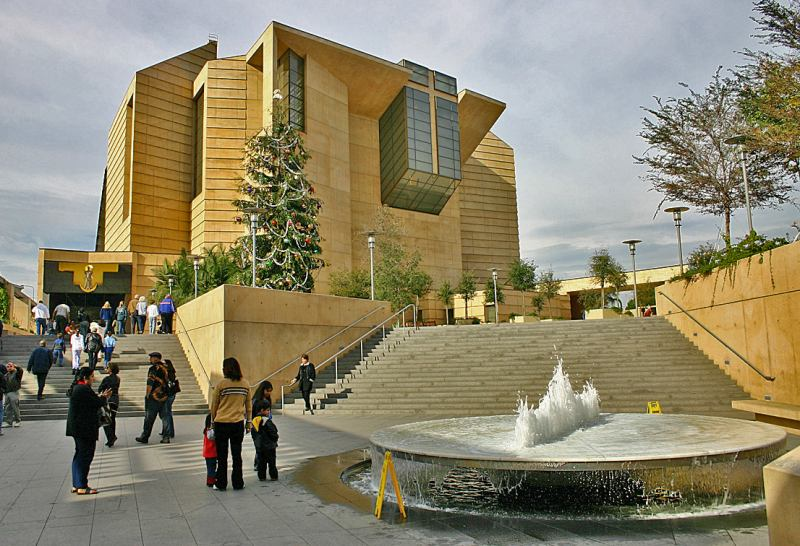
Cathedral of Our Lady of the Angels, Los Angeles

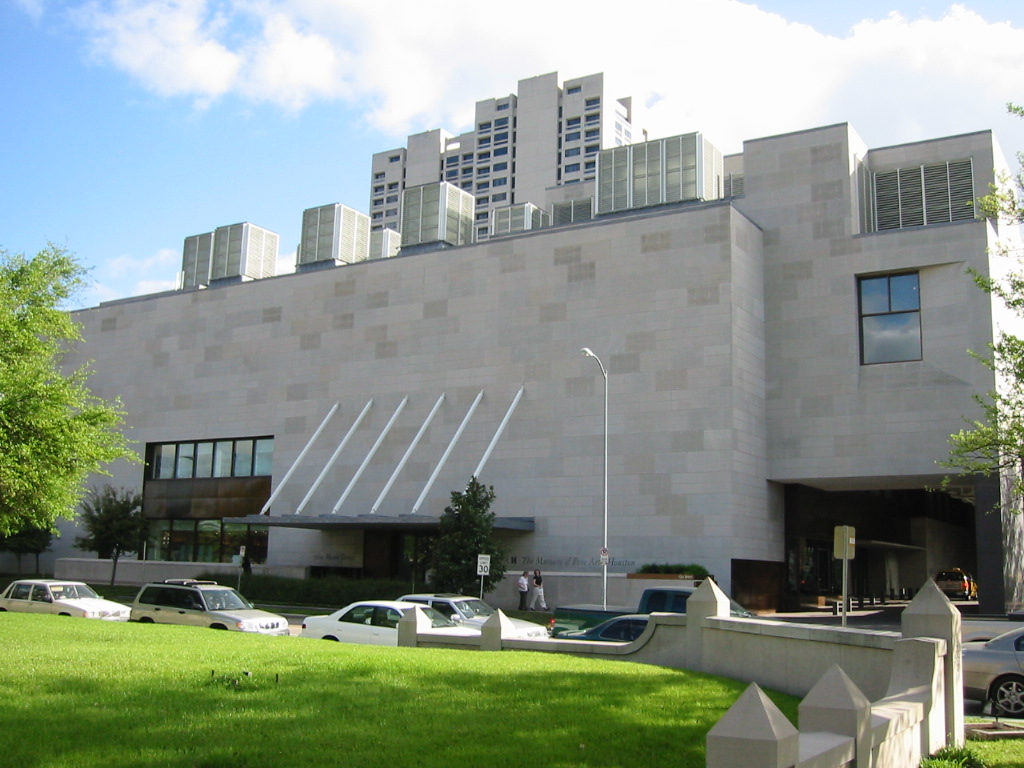
Audrey Jones Beck Building, Museum of Fine Arts, Houston, Texas

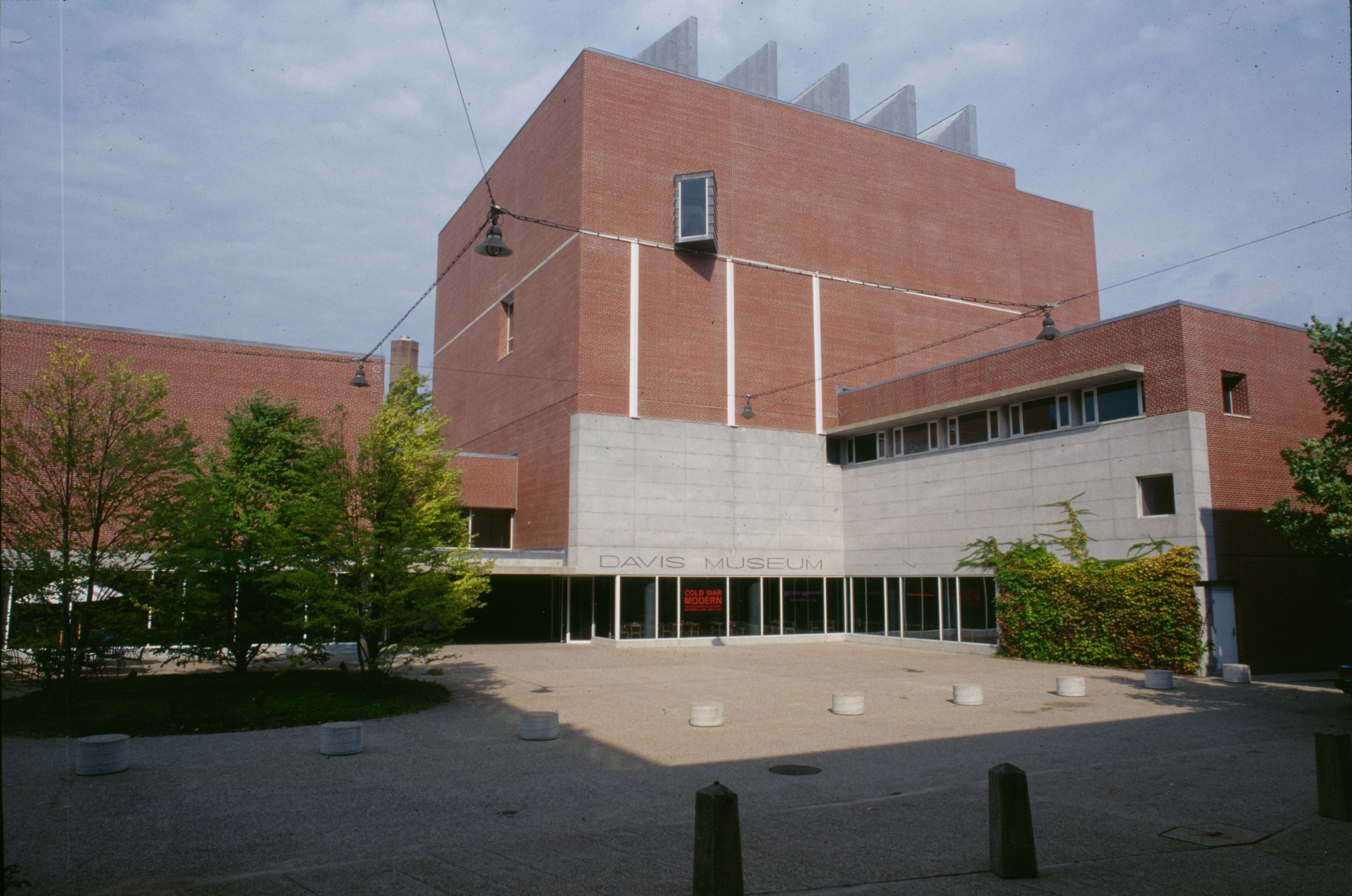
Davis Museum and Cultural Center at Wellesley College

== Works ==
- National Museum of Roman Art, Mérida, Spain (1986)
- Davis Art Museum, Wellesley, Massachusetts (1993)
- Moderna Museet and Swedish Centre for Architecture and Design, Stockholm, Sweden (1997)
- Kursaal Congress Centre and Auditorium, San Sebastián, Basque Country, Spain (1999)
- Audrey Jones Beck Building, Museum of Fine Arts, Houston, Texas (2000)
- Library of Sciences, Heverlee, Katholieke Universiteit Leuven, Belgium (2000)
- Cathedral of Our Lady of the Angels, Los Angeles, California (2002)
- Valladolid Science Museum, Valladolid, Spain (2003)
- Museo del Prado expansion, Madrid, Spain (2007)
- New Library of the University of Deusto, Bilbao, Basque Country, Spain (2009)
- Beirut Souks Gold Souk, Beirut, Lebanon (2009)
- Northwest Corner Building, New York City, New York (2010)
- Princeton Neuroscience Institute, Princeton, New Jersey (2013)
- Museum University of Navarra, Pamplona, Spain (2015)

== Awards and honours ==
- National Architecture Award of Spain (1961, 2015)
- Pritzker Prize (1996)
- RIBA Royal Gold Medal (2003)
- Honorary Fellowship of the Royal Institute of the Architects of Ireland (2011)
- Prince of Asturias Award for the Arts (2012)
- Praemium Imperiale (2017)
- Soane Medal (2017)
- Golden Lion (2021)
