= Kursaal Congress Centre and Auditorium =

Convention complex in San Sebastián, Spain

Coordinates: 43.3243°N 1.978°W

Palacio de Congresos Kursaal
- Kursaal Congress Centre
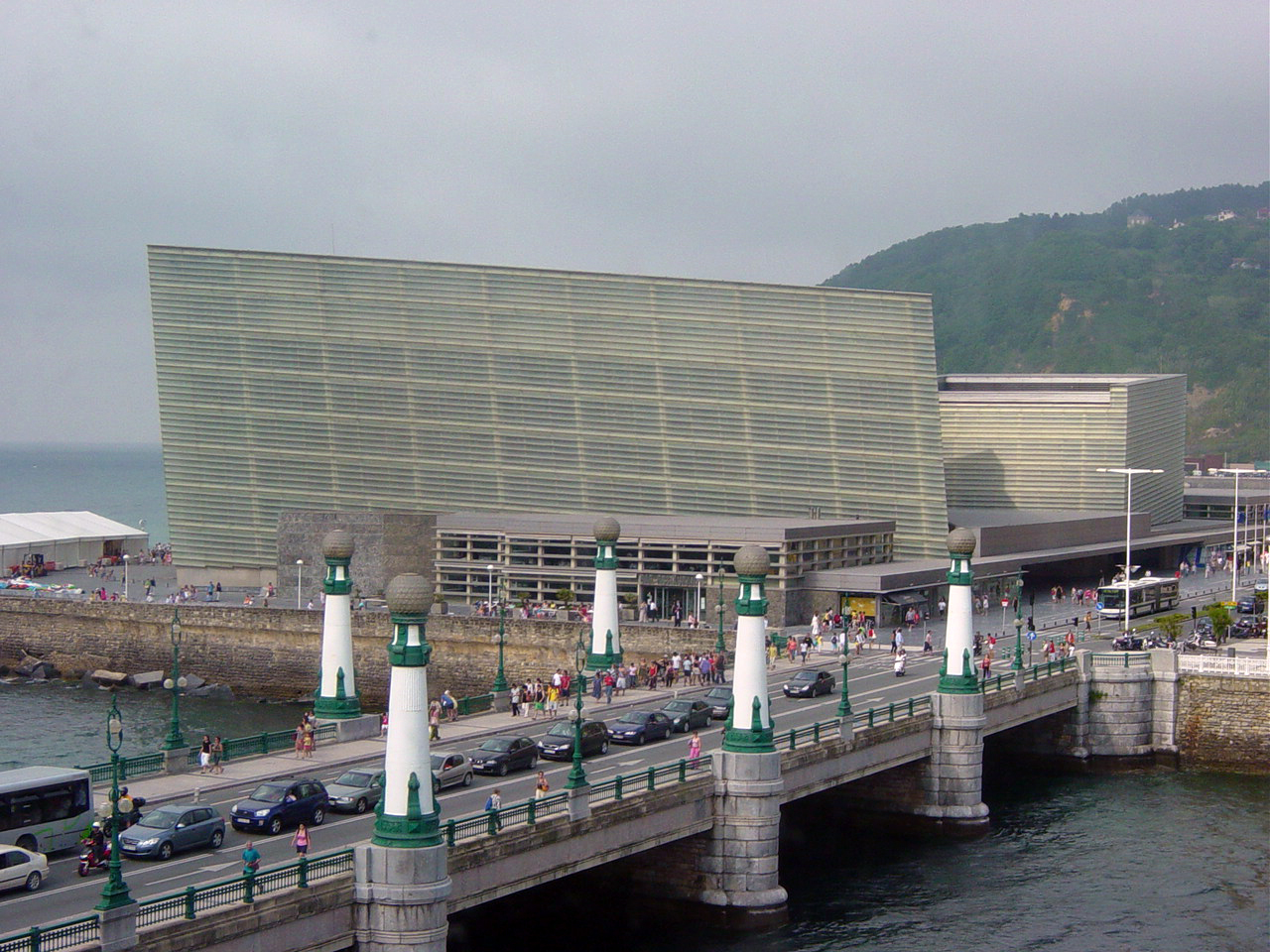
- The Kursaal Congress Centre
- Interactive map of Palacio de Congresos Kursaal
- Location: Donostia-San Sebastián (Basque Country, Spain)
- Type: Convention center

Construction
- Opened: 1999

Website
- Official website of the Kursaal

The Kursaal Congress Centre and Auditorium (Basque: Kursaal jauregia, Spanish: Palacio de Congresos y Auditorio Kursaal) is a multi-purpose exhibition complex located in Donostia-San Sebastián, Basque Country, Spain. Opened in 1999 and designed by Spanish architect Rafael Moneo, it consists of several spaces, including a 1,800-seat auditorium, multi-use and exhibition halls.

The centre is the home to the largest film festival in Spain, the San Sebastian International Film Festival, founded in 1953. In 2001, Kursaal Congress Centre and its architect Rafael Moneo were awarded the European Union Prize for Contemporary Architecture.

== History ==
=== The Great Kursaal of San Sebastian ===
The Great Maritime Kursaal of St. Sebastian opened in 1921, and was modeled after other European Kursaals—buildings for the use of visitors at health resorts or spas that generally included ballrooms, game and concert halls and restaurants. The palace was located in front of the Gros beach, next to the mouth of the Urumea River, on land gained from the sea. It incorporated a casino, a restaurant, a cinema and an 859-seat theater. Part of the interior, including the main hall, was designed by Victor Eusa.

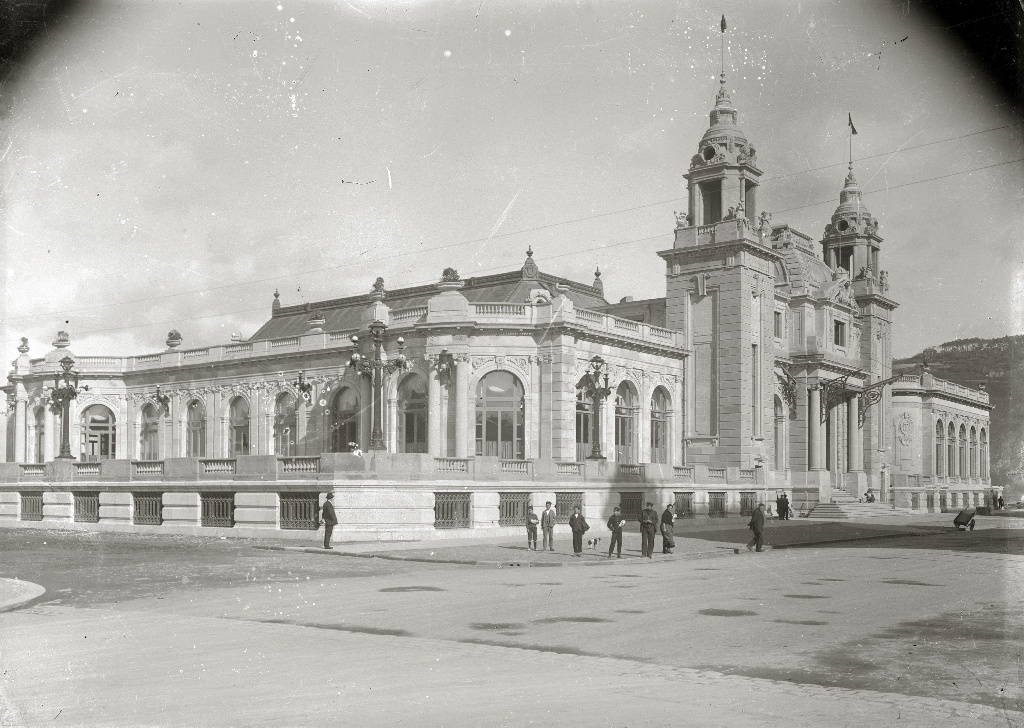
The historic Kursaal casino, next to the river's mouth.

After the prohibition of gambling in Spain, the building fell into disuse and sustained long-term damage. In 1965, a competition was held to find a replacement. However, the winning project was never constructed due to its complexity. The palace was demolished in 1973, freeing an empty plot (later called K Plot).

A new project proposal was submitted in 1972. After a few changes to the design, construction started in 1975, but after the perimeter wall was complete and the foundations were laid, works were halted. The plot of land then passed from private hands to public and a consortium was created for the purposes of constructing a new building.

=== Current complex ===
In 1989, six internationally renowned architects were invited to a technical consultation: Mario Botta, Norman Foster, Arata Isozaki, Rafael Moneo, Juan Navarro Baldeweg and Luis Peña Ganchegui. Of the six projects, the one by Moneo, titled "Two Stranded Rocks" was chosen.

The project was drafted between 1991 and 1994, and in 1995, the final approval was given for the start of the works. Construction began in 1996, and was completed in 1999. The project faced financing problems, including the refusal of the Basque Government (which would be responsible for 16 % of the cost of the work) to expand the funds allocated to its construction.

The building was inaugurated on August 23, 1999, with a concert of the Basque Country Symphony Orchestra and Ainhoa Arteta. Its importance was also eclipsed by the parallel construction of the Guggenheim Museum in Bilbao, whose cost was more than twice that of the Kursaal.

Initially, the impact on the urban landscape of San Sebastian, dominated by its classical French-style architecture, was characterized as negative. However, after a period of adaptation and due to the positive impact of the palace on the economy, tourism and cultural life of San Sebastian, the opinion of the majority of its residents changed to a positive attitude towards it.

== The building ==
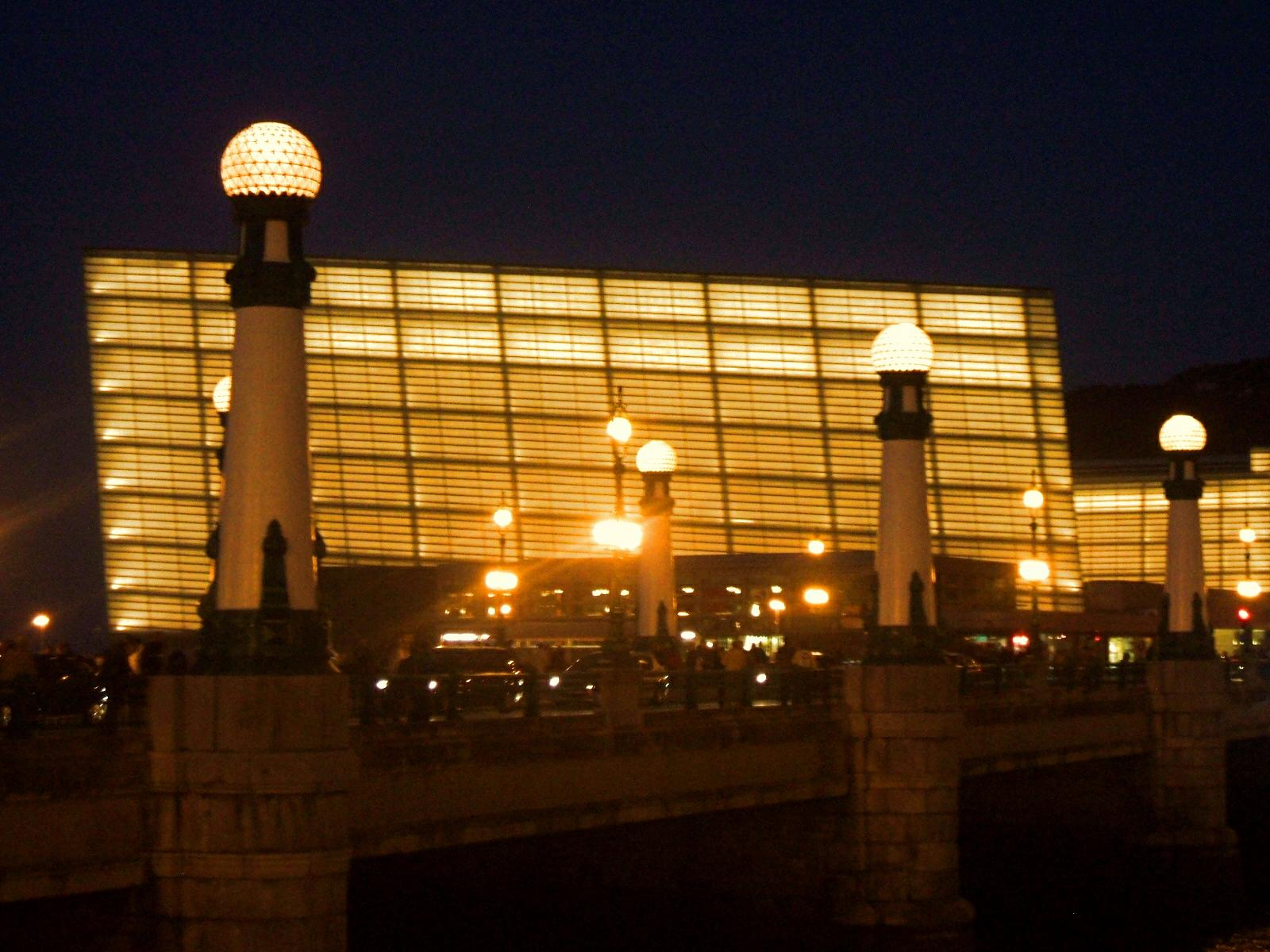
Night view of Kursaal Palace and Kursaal Bridge.

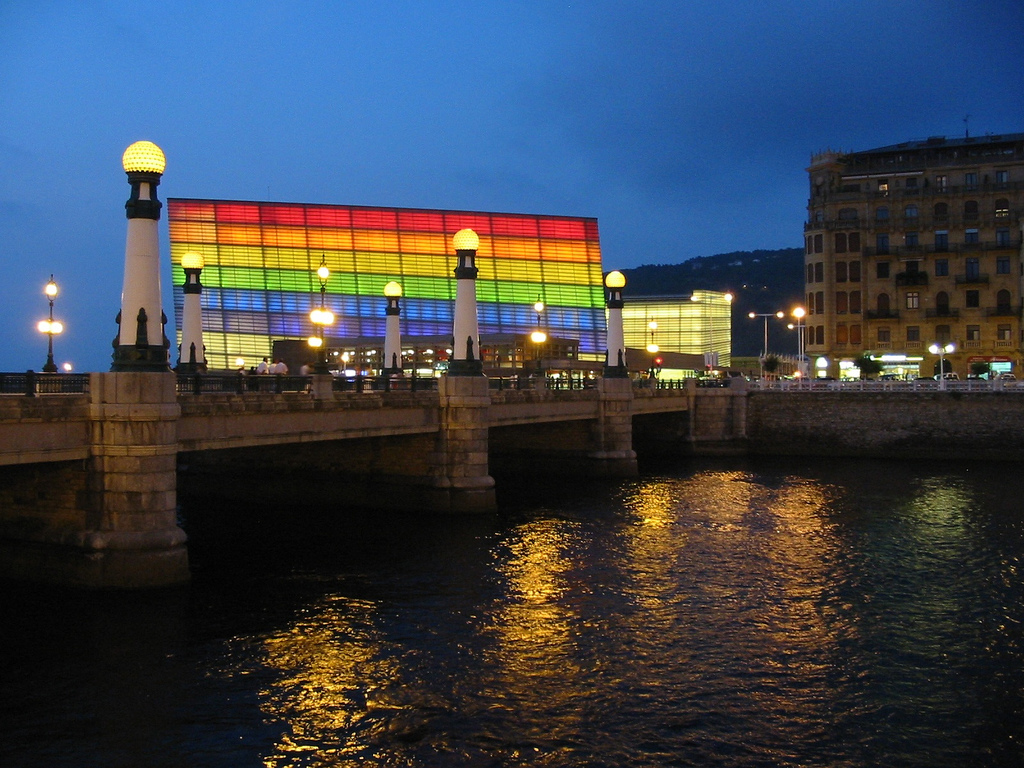
Night view of Kursaal Palace lit up with Rainbow flag colors.

It is mainly constituted as two large prismatic volumes, that emerge from a platform. Each "cube" (as they are known), is formed by an inner prismatic structure, surrounded by double translucent glass panels, which are supported by a metallic structure. Between the cubes there is a large terrace, commanding views which take in the Zurriola Beach and the mouth of the Urumea river. This terrace is host to many events, including many of the concerts which go to make up the Donostia Jazz Festival ("Jazzaldia").

- Kursaal Auditorium

Placed inside the biggest cube (and closest to the sea), this auditorium can hold an audience of 1,806, and is the most frequently used one for big events. The first seat rows can be removed to make room for the orchestra in an opera.

- Chamber Hall

This seats 600 people, and is placed in the small cube. It is used for congresses or smaller concerts.

- Multiple-use rooms

These are used for a variety of events for more limited audiences.

- Exhibition halls

The halls are used for housing galleries and other exhibitions.

- Kubo Hall

It is an exhibition hall under the supervision of the Kutxa savings bank.

Moreover, the building has a restaurant owned by Martín Berasategui, various shops in its basement, and a car park.
