= National Museum of Roman Art =

Archaeology museum in Mérida, Spain

- Museo Nacional de Arte Romano
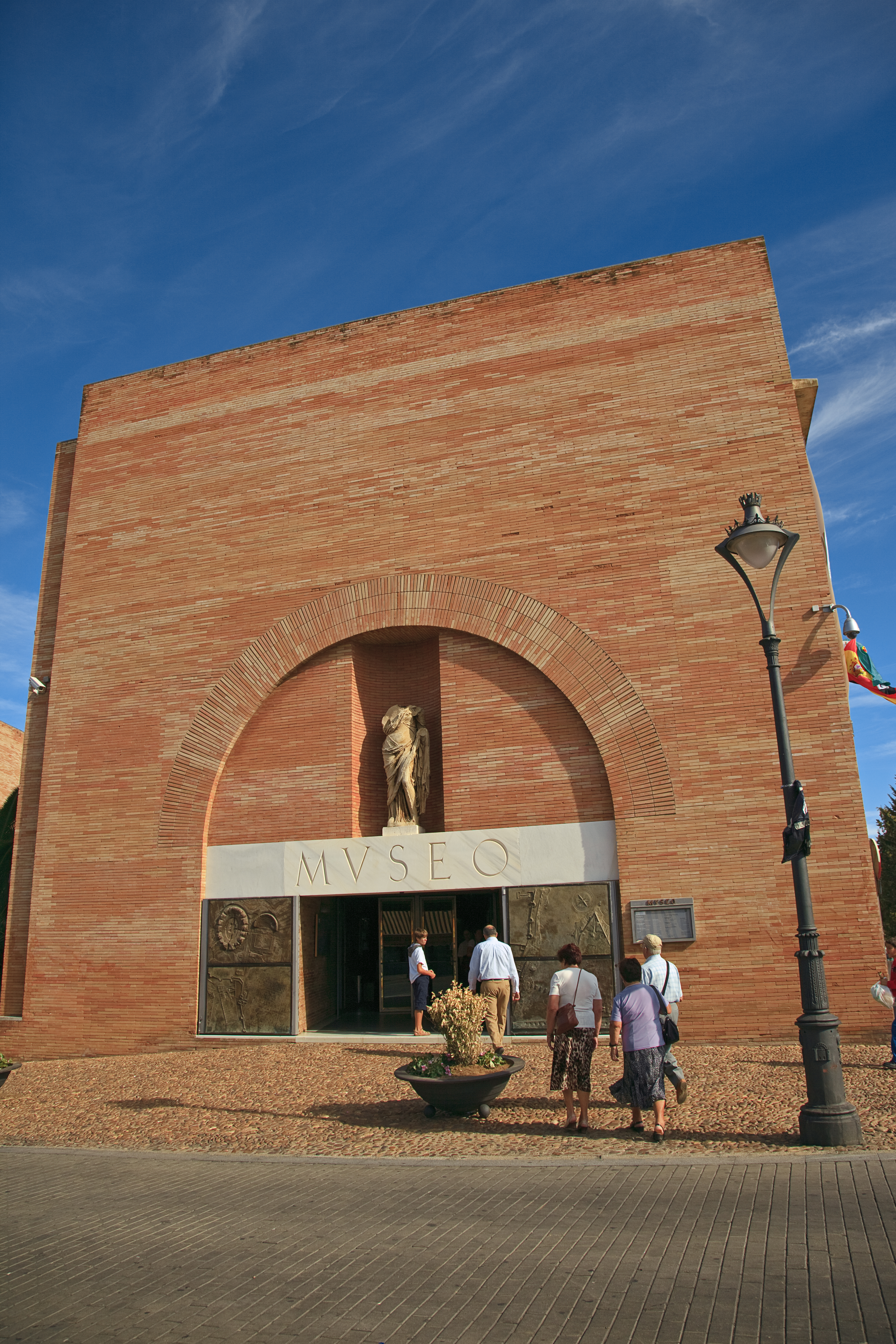
- Façade of the Museum
- Former name: Museo Arqueológico de Mérida
- Established: 26 March 1838
- Location: Mérida, Spain
- Coordinates: 38°55′02″N 6°20′23″W
- Type: Archaeology museum
- Collections: Roman art
- Collection size: 37,000
- Visitors: 239,798 (2017)
- Director: Trinidad Nogales Basarrate
- Architect: Rafael Moneo
- Owner: General State Administration
- Website: museoarteromano.mcu.es

UNESCO World Heritage Site
- Type: Cultural
- Criteria: iii, iv
- Designated: 1993 (17th session)
- Part of: Archaeological Ensemble of Mérida
- Reference no.: 664-017
- Region: Europe and North America

Spanish Cultural Heritage
- Type: Non-movable
- Criteria: Monument
- Designated: 1 March 1962
- Reference no.: RI-51-0001309

The National Museum of Roman Art (Spanish: Museo Nacional de Arte Romano; MNAR) is an archaeology museum in Mérida, Spain. Devoted to Roman art, it exhibits extensive material from the archaeological ensemble of Mérida (the Roman colony of Augusta Emerita), one of the largest and most extensive archaeological sites in Spain, registered as UNESCO World Heritage Site in 1993. It is one of the National Museums of Spain and it is attached to the Ministry of Culture.

== History ==
An archaeology museum in Mérida was created for the first time through a royal order issued on 26 March 1838. A church building was repurposed to house the collections as part of the Ecclesiastical confiscations of Mendizábal.

In 1975, on the occasion of the two thousandth anniversary of the city's foundation, the museum was refounded as the National Museum of Roman Art. The current building is a work by Spanish architect Rafael Moneo. Building works started in 1981. The new premises were unveiled on 19 September 1986.

== Gallery ==
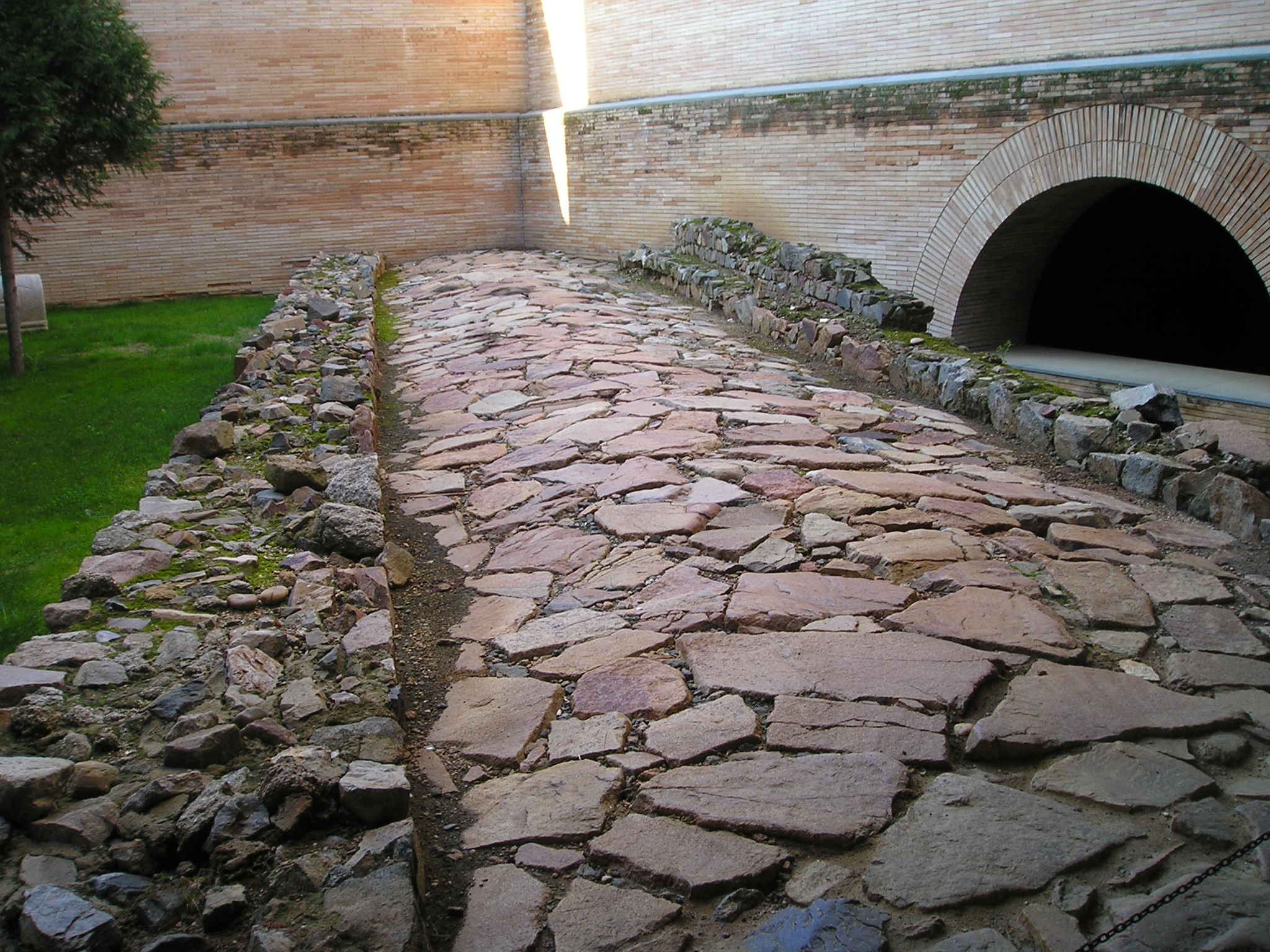
Roman road

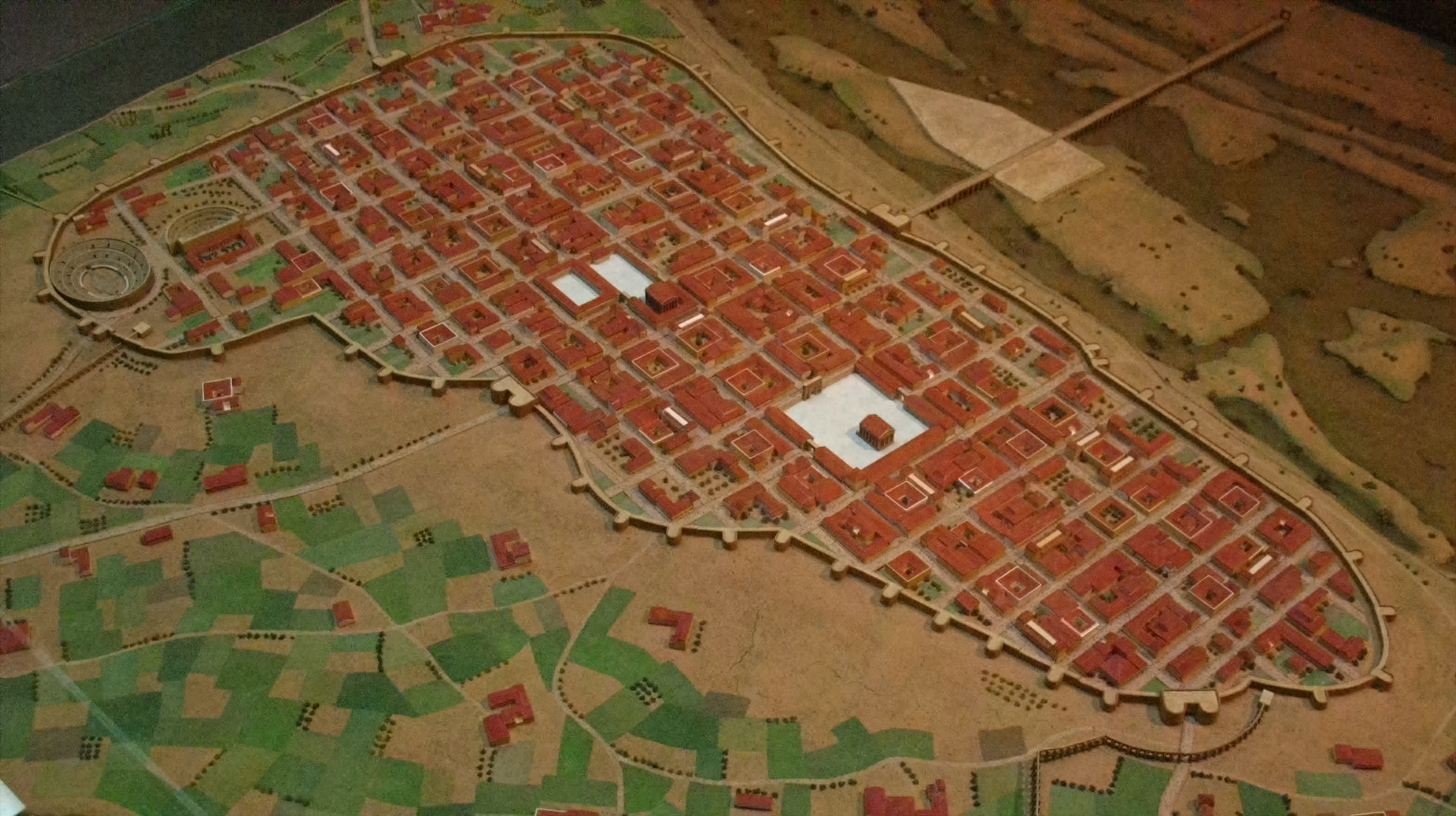
Augusta Emerita scale model

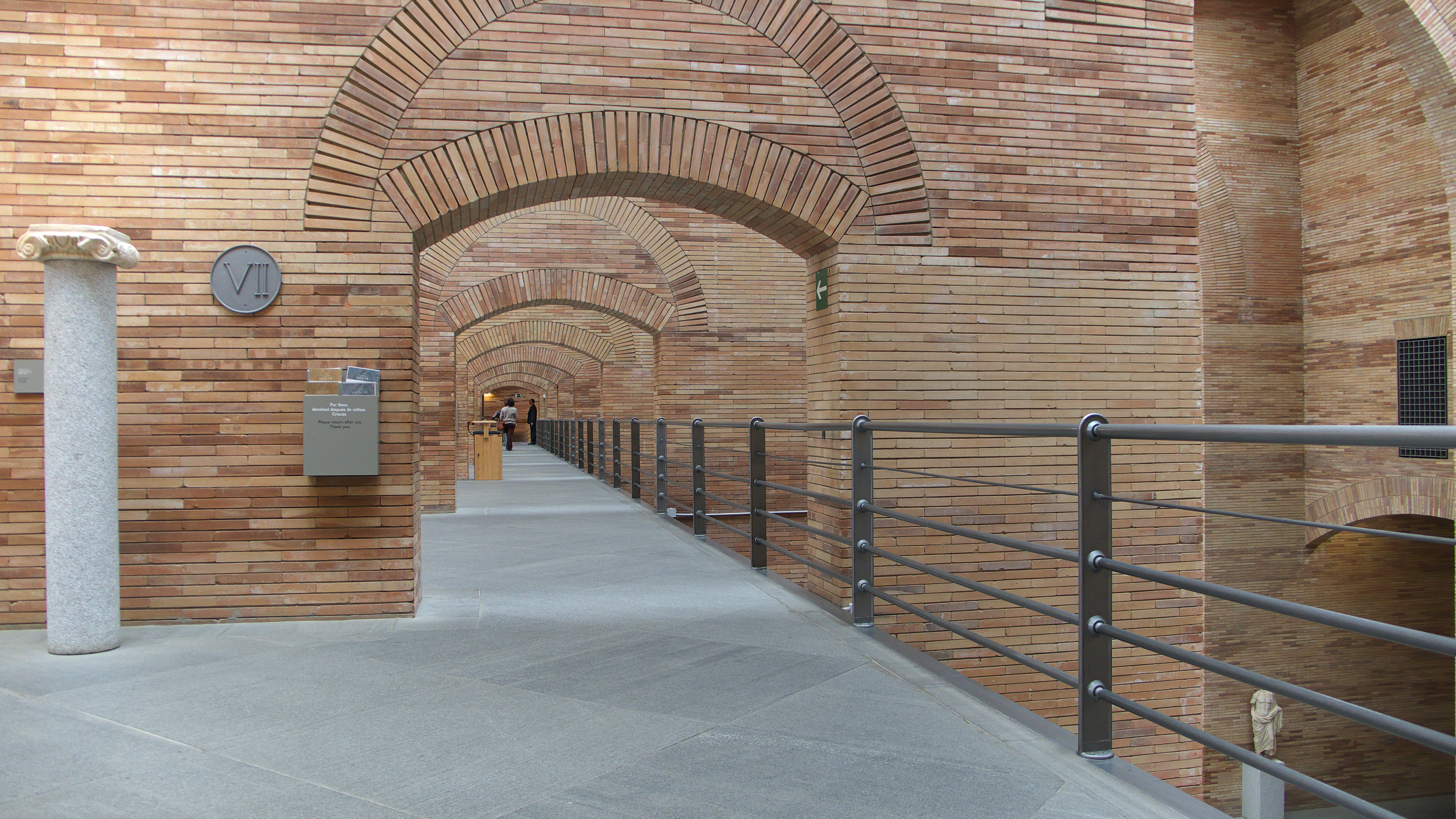
Upper level corridor

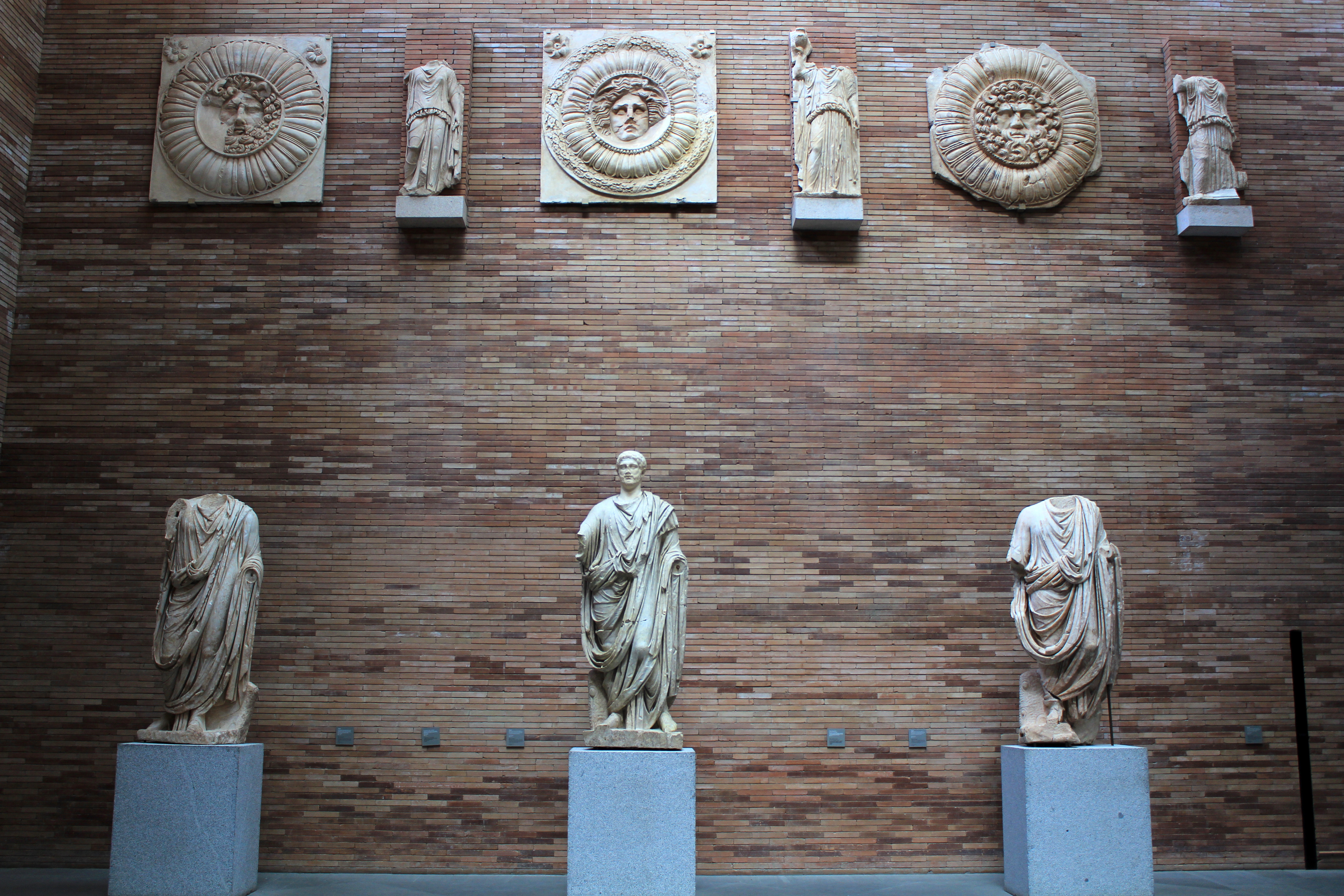
Roman statues and reliefs

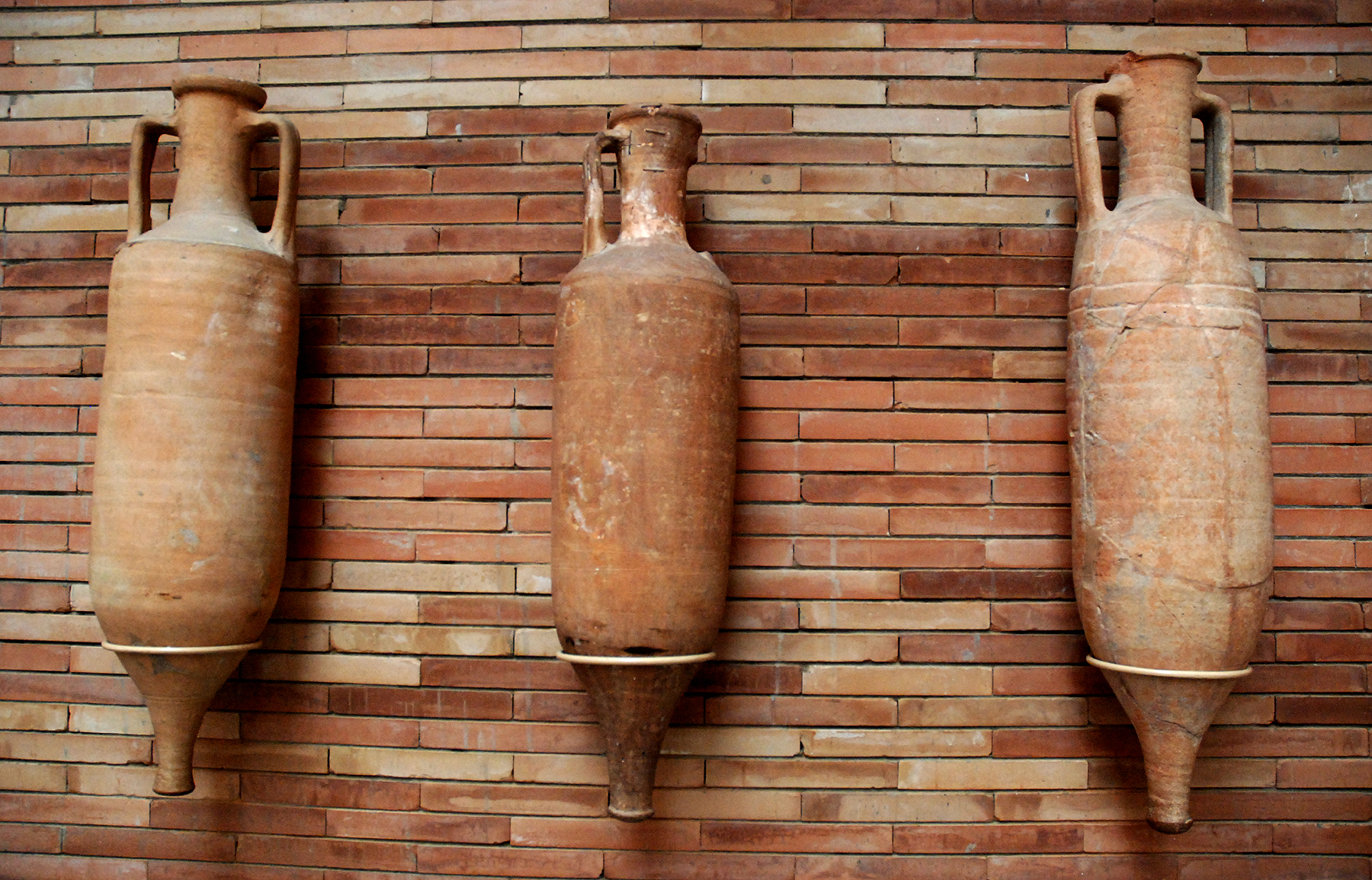
Roman Amphoras

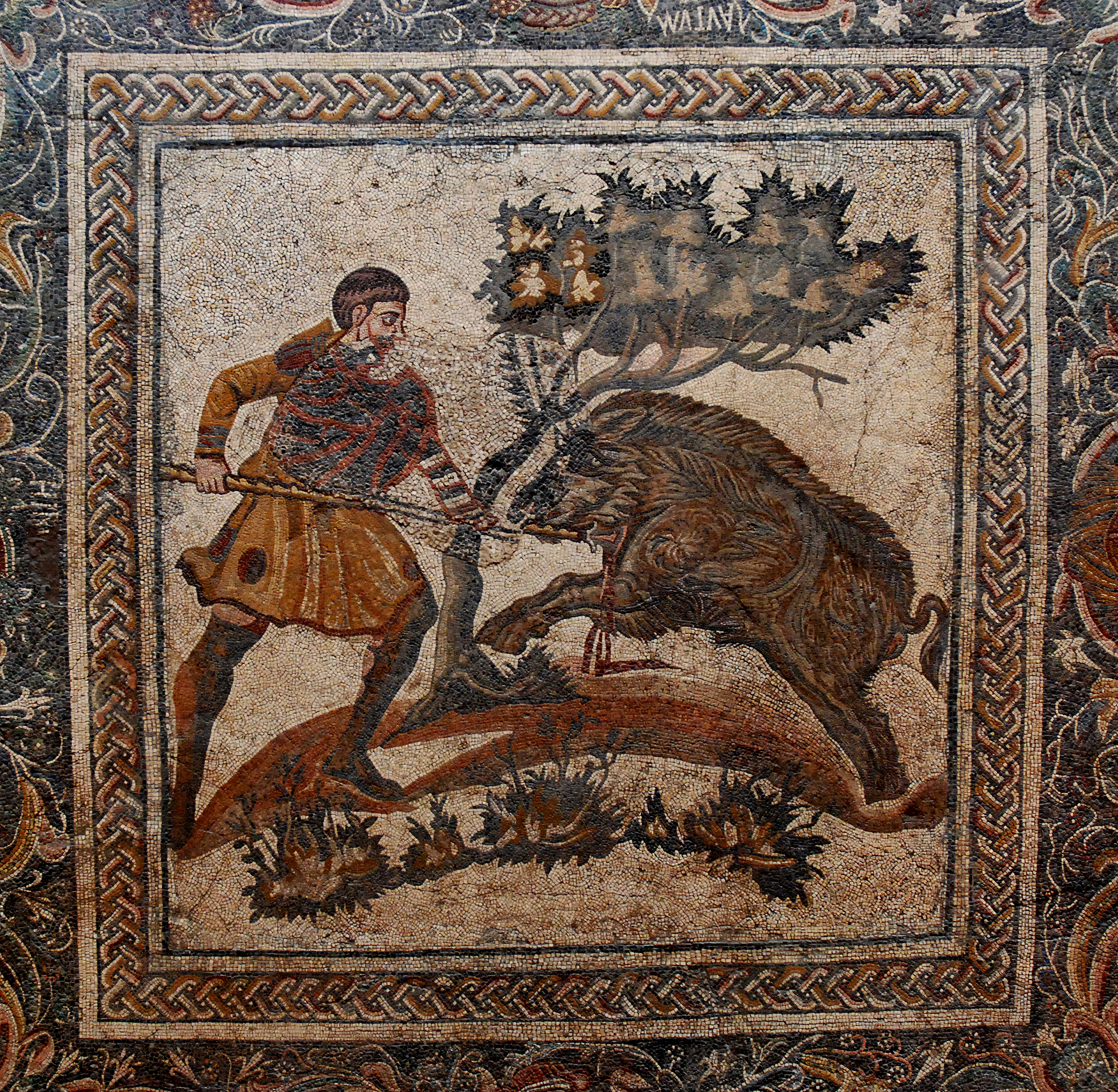
Las Tiendas mosaic
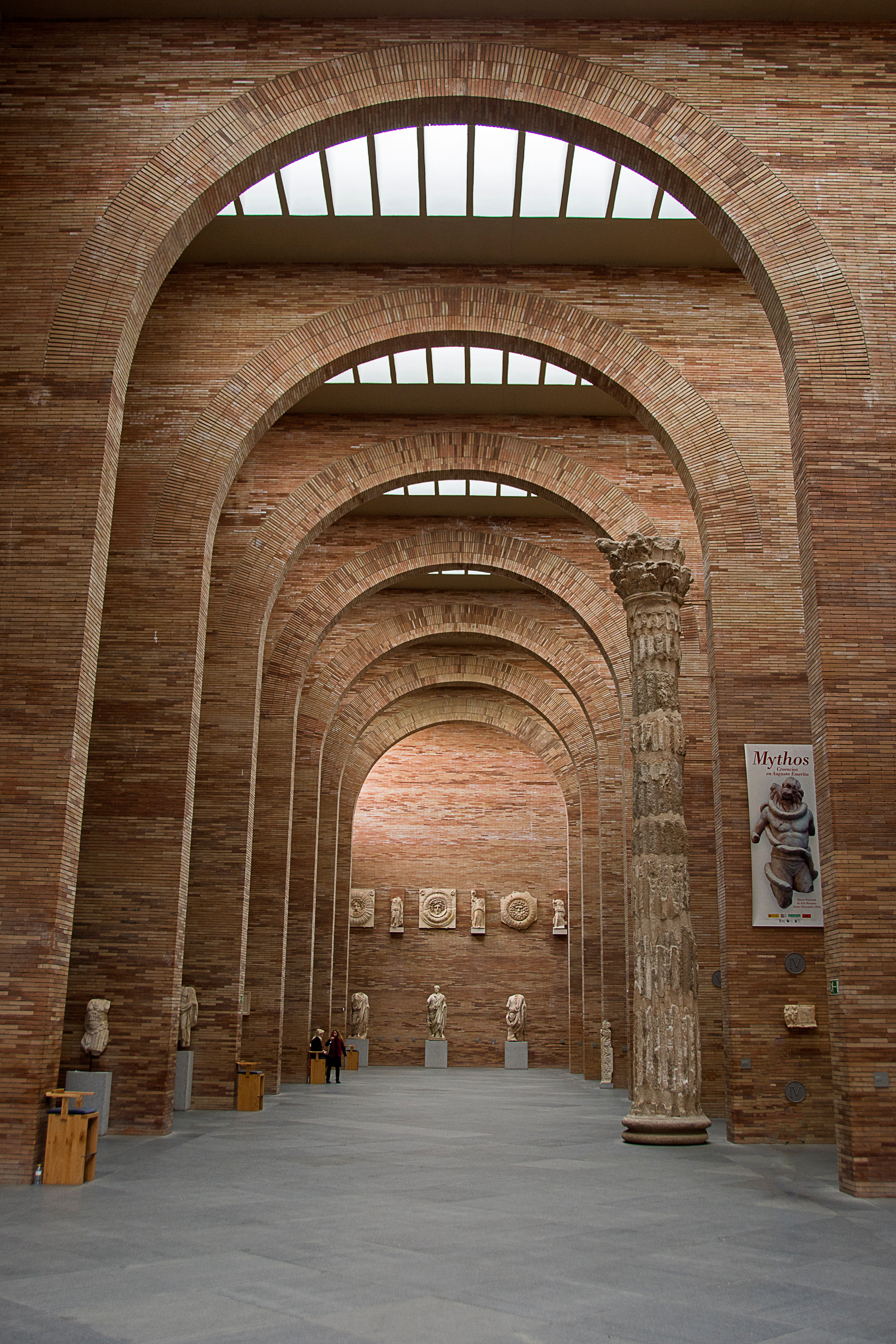
Main Hall

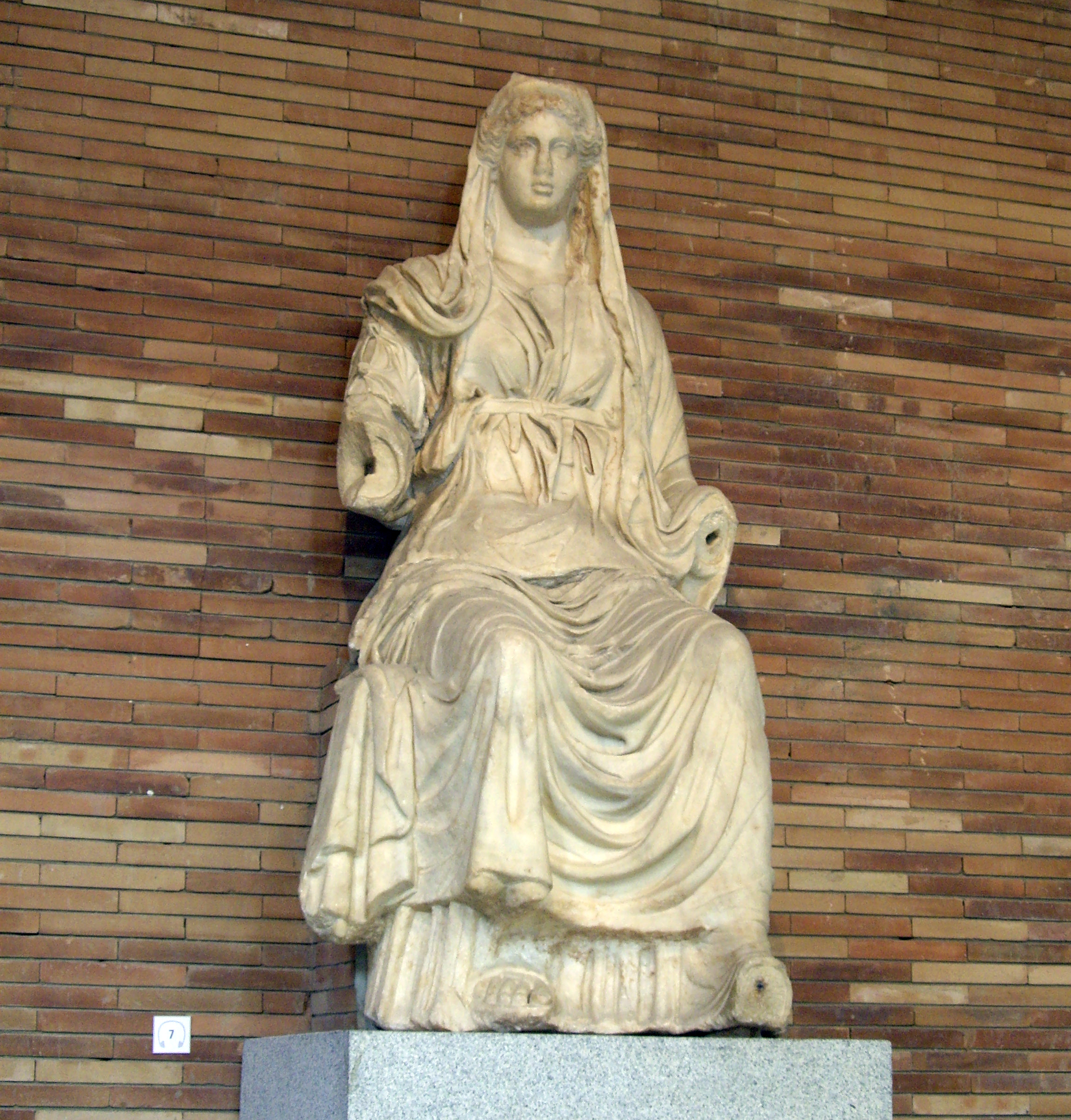
Seated Ceres (1st century AD)

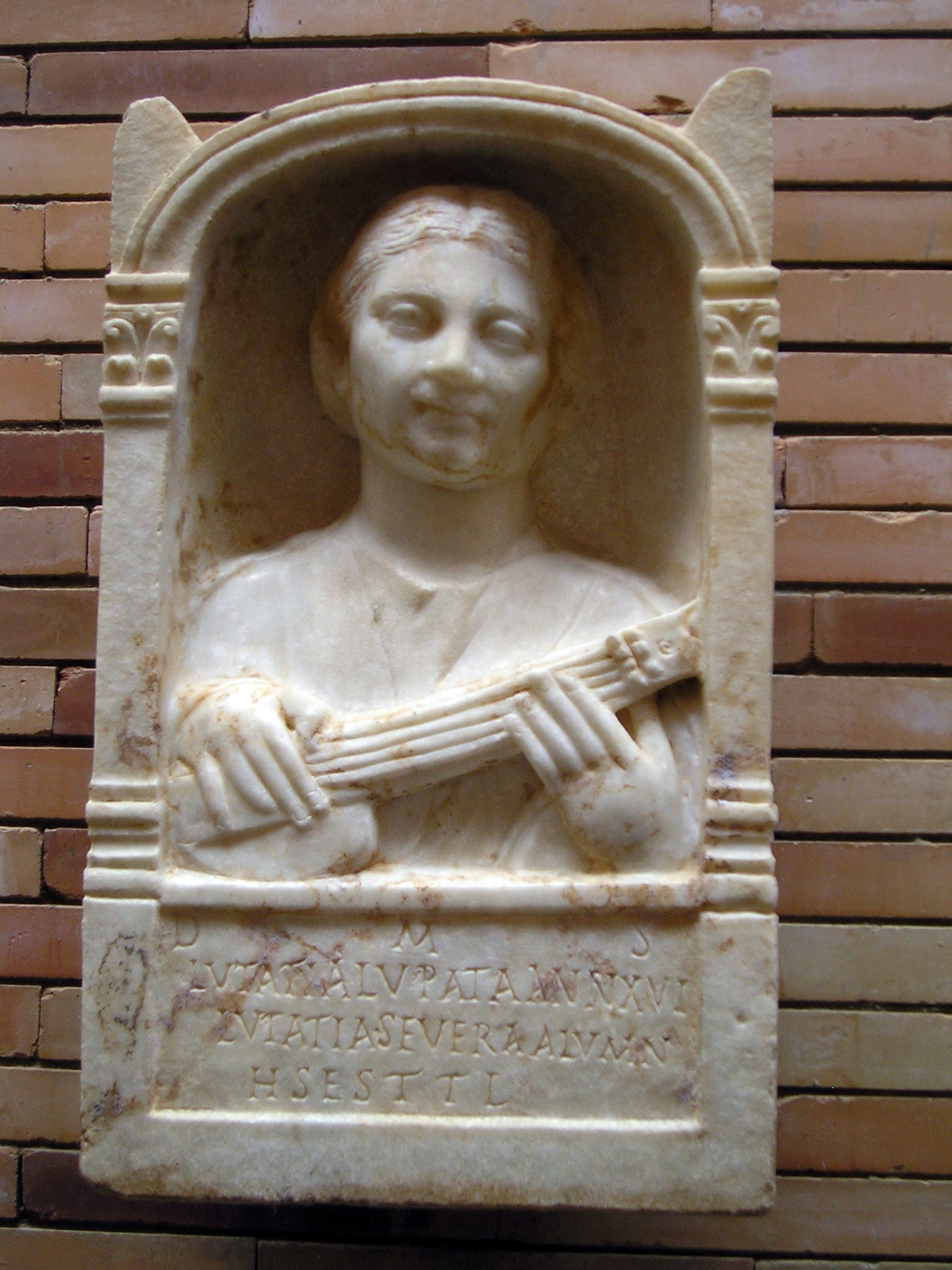
Lutatia Lupata Stele

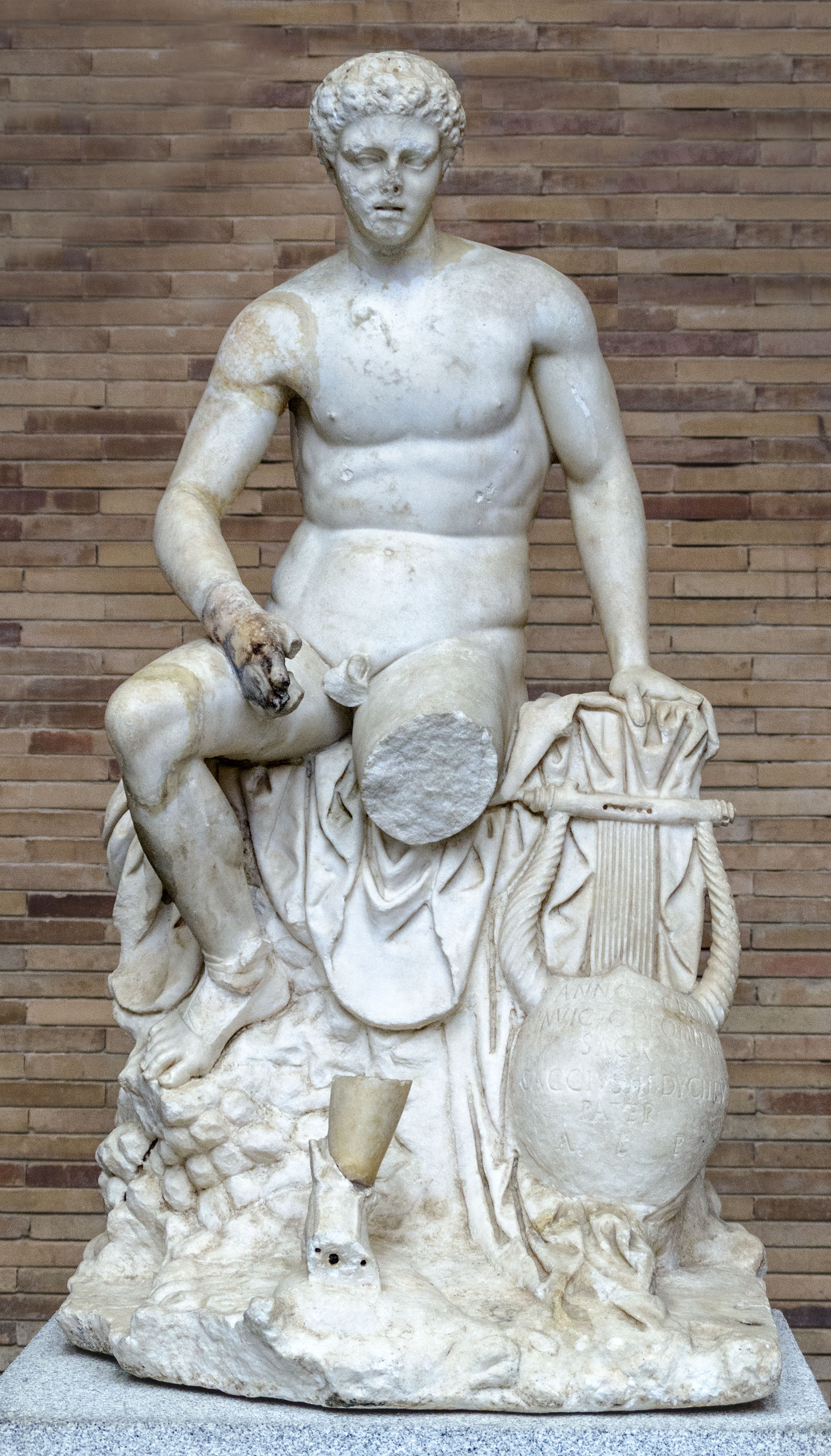
Mercury

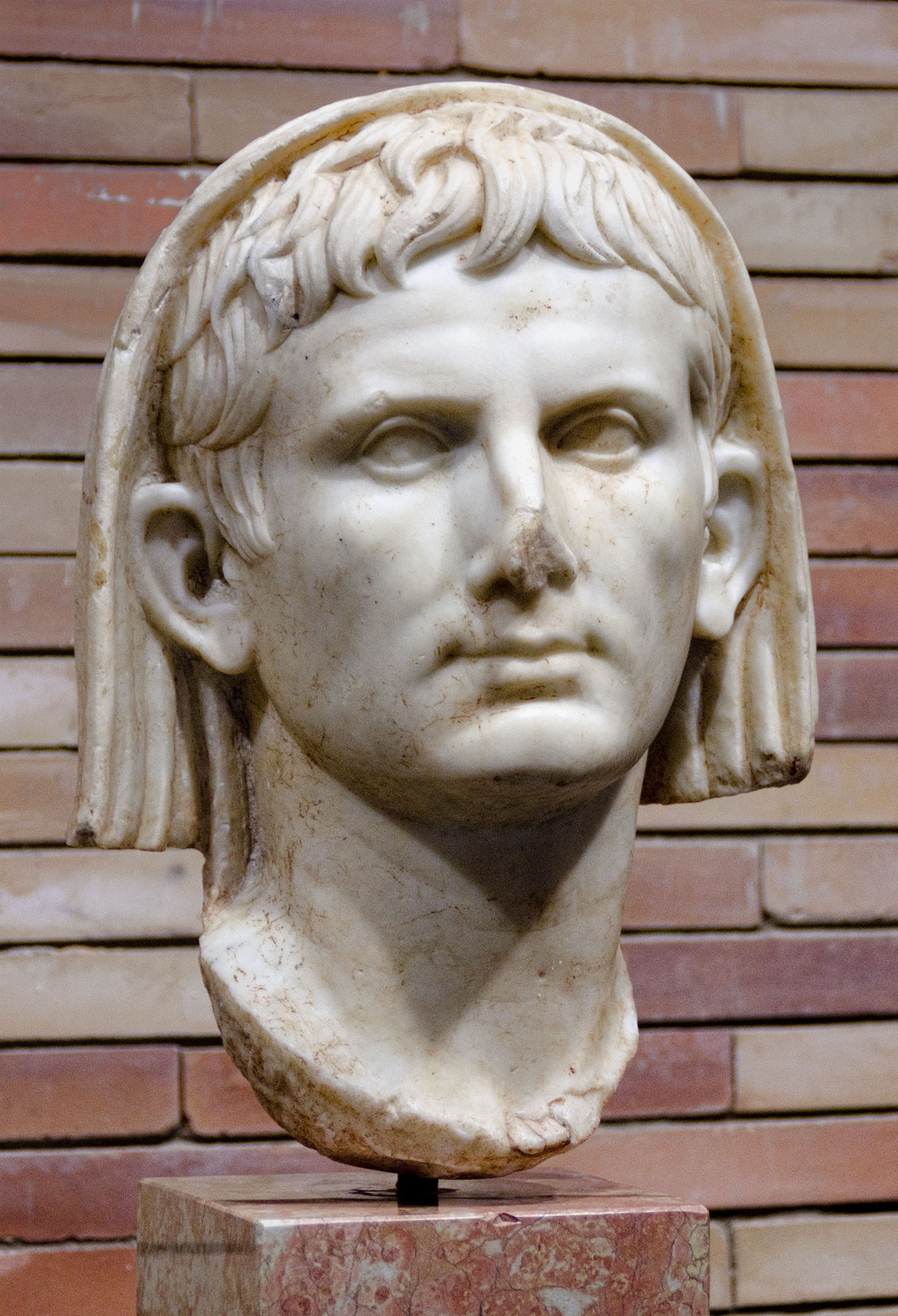
Augustus as Pontifex maximus

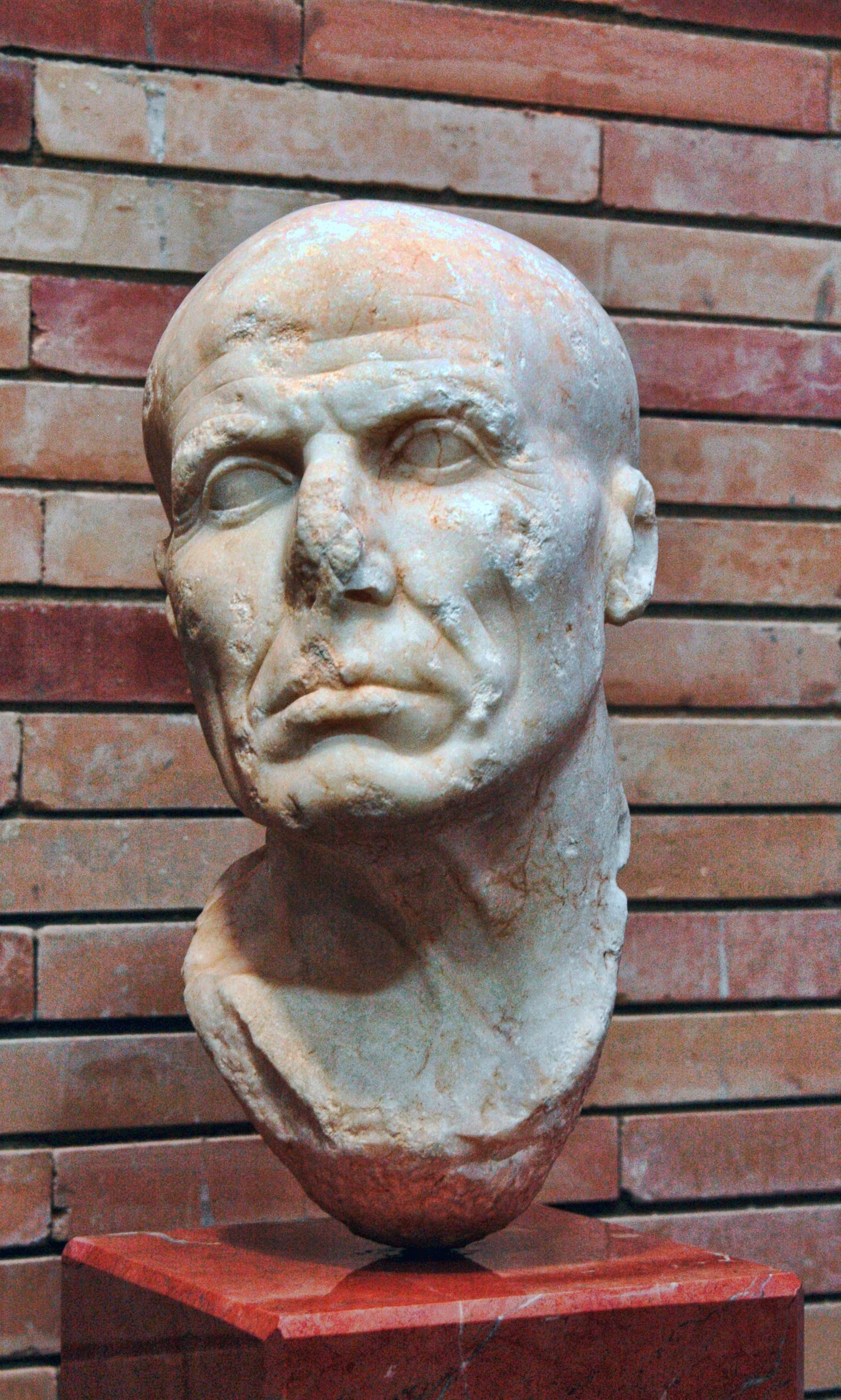
Man
