= Davis Museum at Wellesley College =

Davis Museum
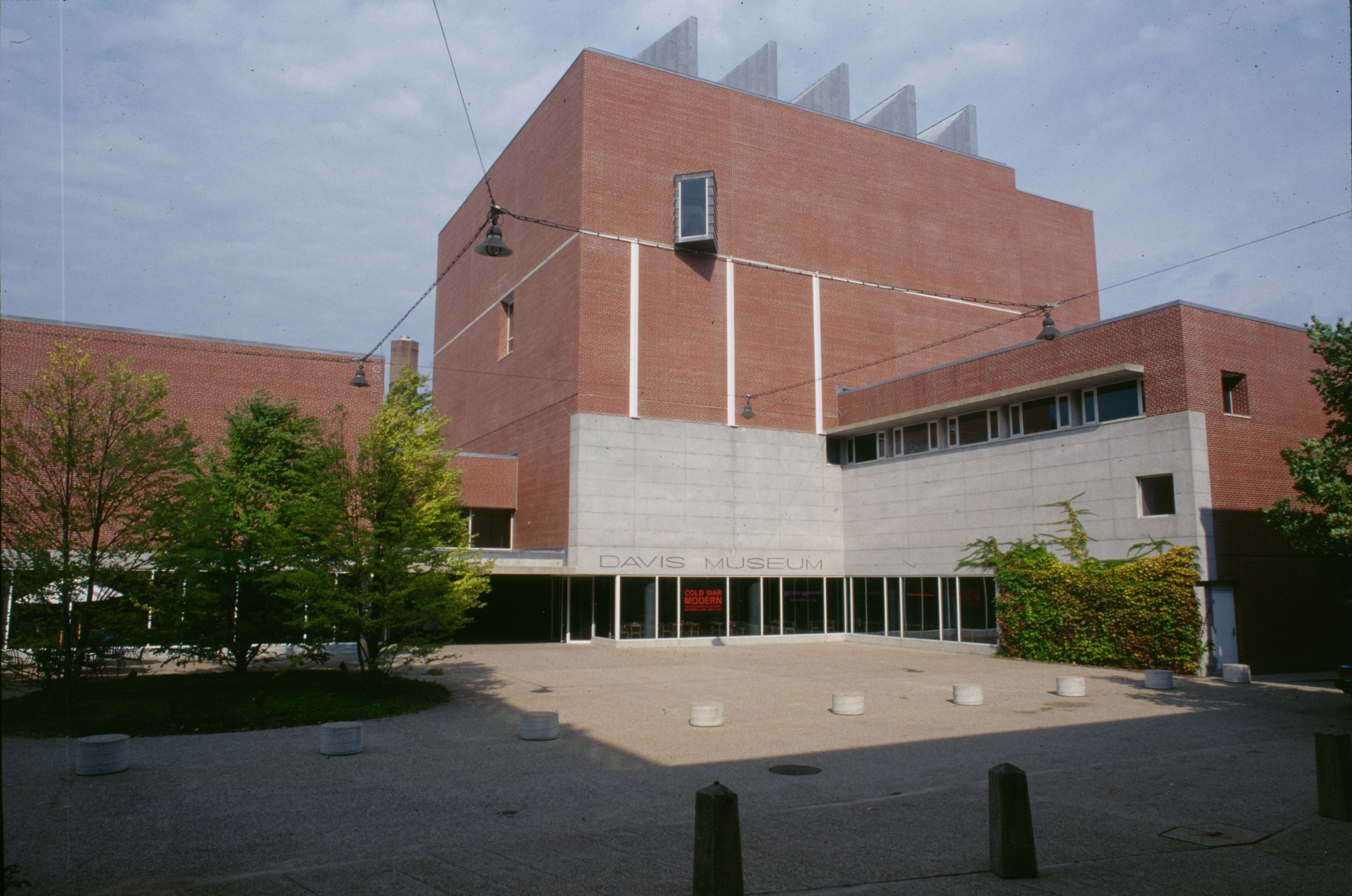
- Established: 1993
- Location: Wellesley College, Wellesley, Massachusetts
- Coordinates: 42°17′37.3884″N 71°18′26.19″W
- Collection size: 11,000
- Architect: Rafael Moneo
- Website: wellesley.edu/davismuseum

The Davis Museum is an art museum located on the Wellesley College campus in Wellesley, Massachusetts. The college art collection was first displayed in the Farnsworth Art Building, founded in 1889. The museum in its present form opened in 1993 in a building designed by Rafael Moneo.

The permanent collection of about 11,000 objects ranges from antiquity to the present day.

The artists represented in the collection include:

- Paul Cézanne
- John Singleton Copley
- Lavinia Fontana
- Alberto Giacometti
- Al Held
- Hiroshige
- George Inness
- Alex Katz
- Angelica Kauffmann
- Oskar Kokoschka
- Georg Kolbe
- Willem de Kooning
- Lee Krasner
- Sol LeWitt
- Giacomo Manzù
- Knox Martin
- Ammi Phillips
- Pinturicchio
- Jackson Pollock
- Robert Rauschenberg
- Jacopo Sansovino
- Giorgio Vasari
- Andy Warhol

A large, recently restored mosaic from Antioch, excavated in a joint expedition with the Worcester Art Museum, is also present.
