= Valladolid Science Museum =

Science museum in Spain

Coordinates: 41°38′16″N 4°44′44″W

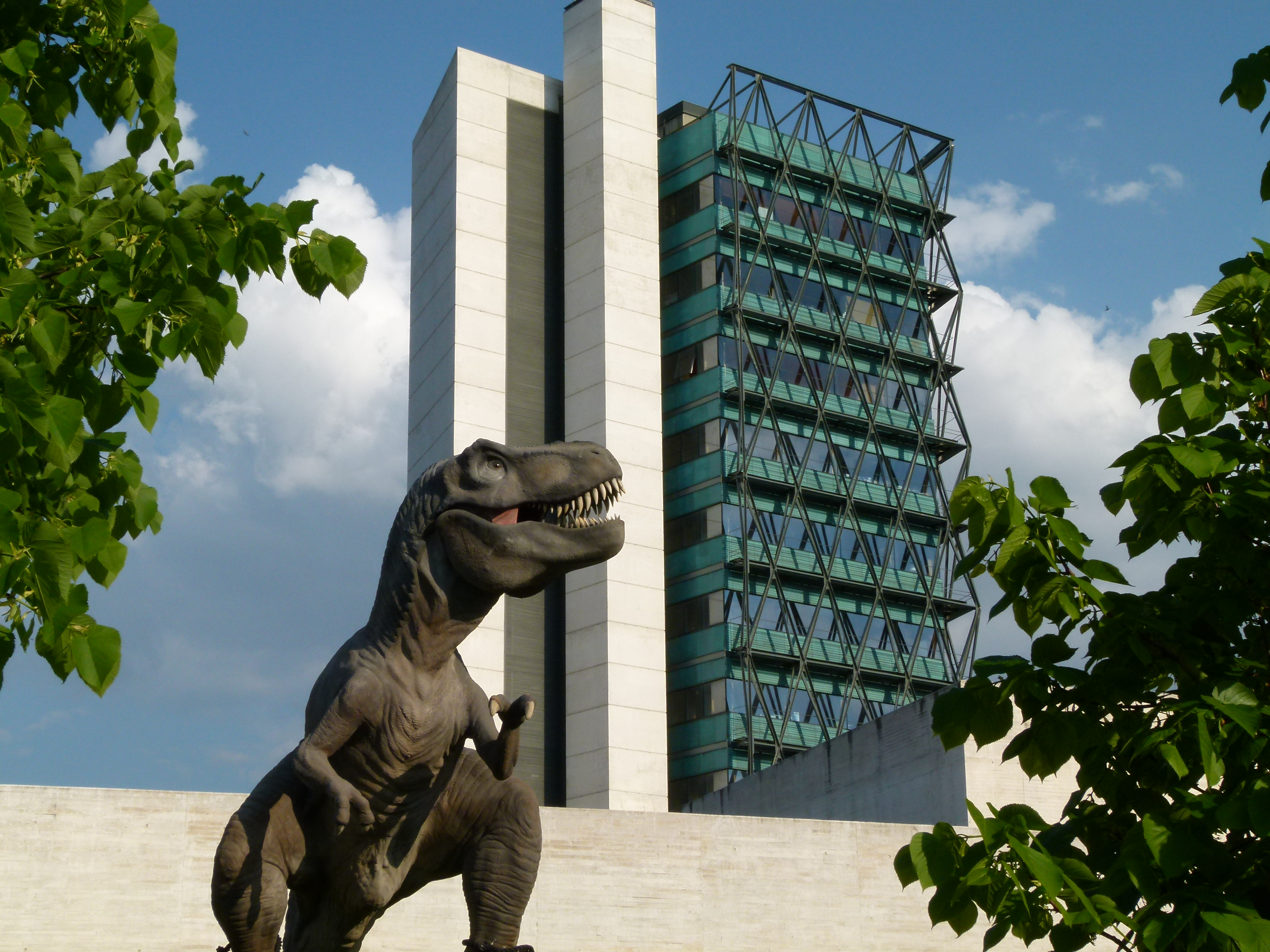
- Valladolid Science Museum
- Established: 2003
- Location: Avenida de Salamanca, Valladolid 47014 - Spain
- Director: Inés Rodríguez Hidalgo
- Website: Website
- Area: 9,300 m^{2} (100,000 sq ft)

Valladolid Science Museum (Spanish: Museo de la Ciencia de Valladolid) was opened in May 2003 as a museum and an iconic piece of architecture based on an old flour mill. Rafael Moneo and Enrique de Teresa used a lot of the old industrial complex to create this new Science Museum.

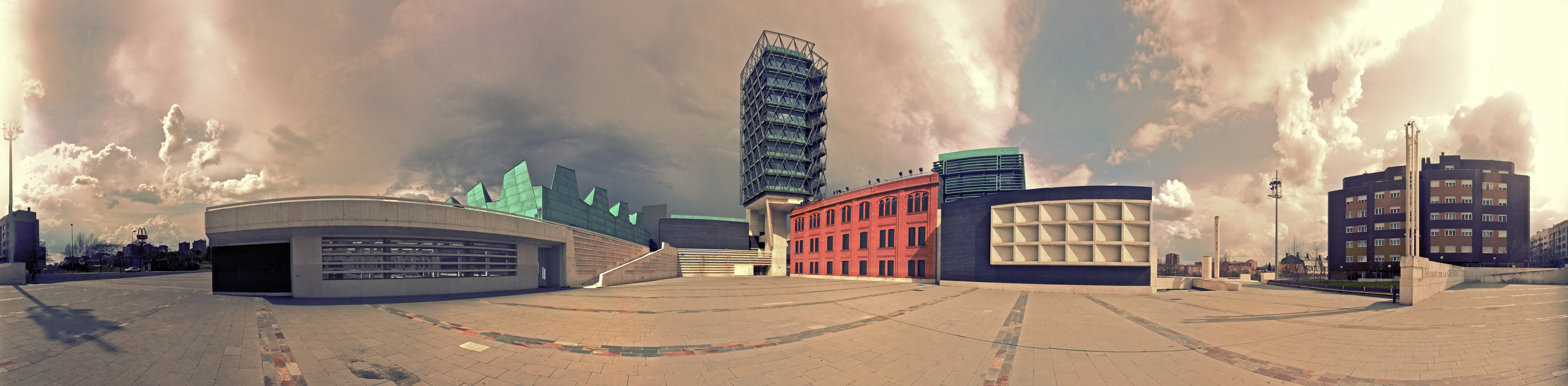
Outside of the museum.

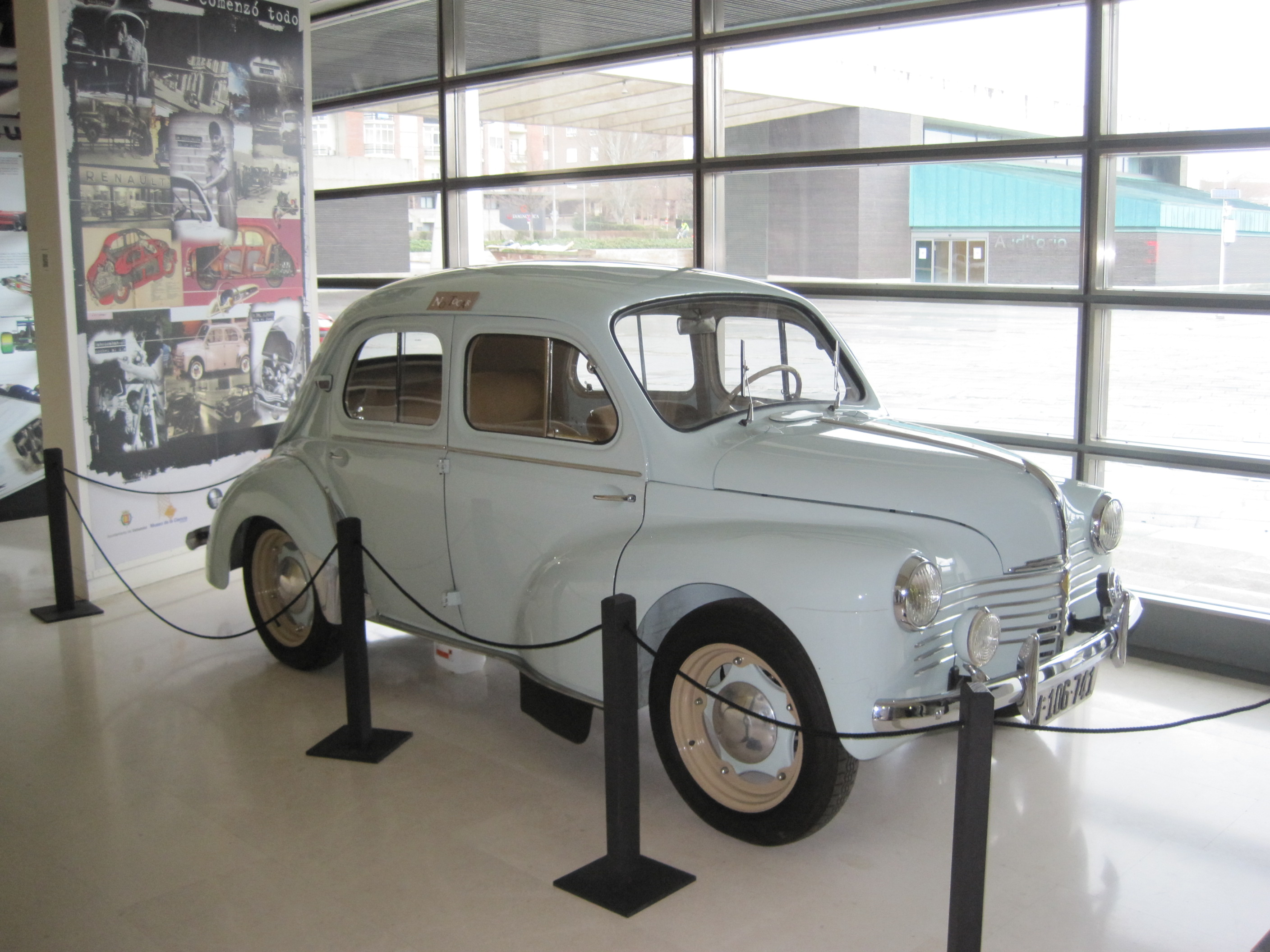
The first car of the Renault 4CV manufactured by FASA-Renault at the factory of Valladolid. The factory was opened in 1951. This copy is located in this museum.

== Description ==
This municipal museum was designed by the architects Rafael Moneo and Enrique de Teresa with the help of Francisco Romero and Juan Jose Echevarria. The museum is to the south west of the city on the right bank of the River Pisuerga with an emblematic footbridge it is seen as a symbol of the city and for the region of Castilla y León.

== North Plaza ==
Pío del Río Hortega was born in the city and after qualifying as a doctor went on to investigate what are now called neurons. He was responsible for discovering microglia. There is a statue of him outside (and a permanent exhibition inside about neurons). Also in the plaza is a statue of Albert Einstein sitting at a bench with his calculations. The plaza also has a weather station.

== Lobby ==
The permanent exhibition in the lobby includes two cars. The fastest is a Williams Formula One car that won the constructors prize. The earlier car is the only car that has been declared of cultural interest to Spain. This is a Renault 4/4 which were constructed in the city at the FASA plant. The lobby has temporary exhibitions and also displays local meteorites and a large model of the DNA molecule.

Besides an area dedicated to Castilla y León inventions and inventors there is an eleven metre high 80 kg Foucault Pendulum as well as a display of Louis Pasteur's work improving wine production.

== First floor ==
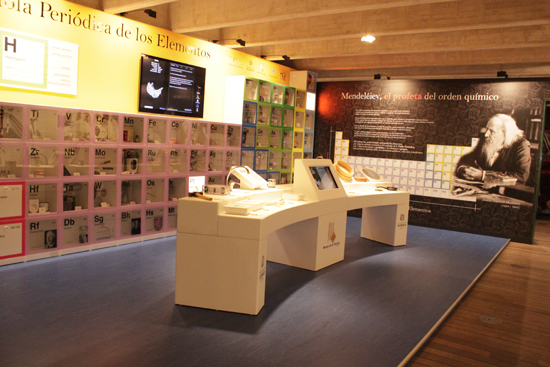
The periodic table

The first floor has a number of interactive displays. One explains the different ways of generating electricity whilst a model of the town shows the cycle of water usage. A large display illustrates Mendeleev and his periodic table whilst another has a three eyed guide called Tripos who explains aquatic life.

== River House ==
The River House (Casa del Rio) was first opened in 2007, but it has since been extended to allow more aquariums, terrariums and interactive displays. The house exploits the museum's location on the banks of the River Pisuerga to explain geography and ecology with reference to the city of Valladolid. The entire ecosystem is illustrated and includes examples of the important species of fish, amphibians and shellfish that should thrive in the region's rivers. Displays illustrate metamorphosis of frogs and toads. The water cycle is explained and its importance in a time of climate change.

== Planetarium ==
The museum claims the honour of having the first digital planetarium in Spain. The 11 metre dome is inclined at an angle of 15 degrees and s used to display astronomical animations of the Solar System, galaxies and stars which are described by resident astronomers. The picture on the dome is created by 11.5 million pixels created by six aligned projectors.
