= Lazy line =

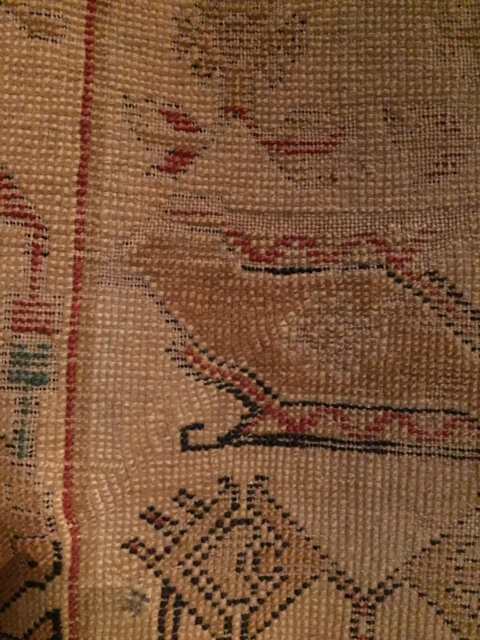
"Lazy line" extending diagonally from bottom left to upper right, running above the upper left angle of the black hook, and crossing the body of a "bird" ornament. Front view of a white-ground Selendi "Transylvanian rug", pile heavily worn. Monastery Church, Sighișoara, Romania.

A lazy line or section line is a technical feature of weaving which describes visible diagonal joins within a woven textile. It results from interlacing wefts joining adjacent warp sections woven at different times. Successive rows of turnarounds of discontinuous wefts create a diagonal line which, in pile rugs, is best seen from the back side, and from the front side only if the pile is heavily worn. A lazy line is created when the weaver does not finish a rug line by line from one side to the other, but sequentially finishes one area after the other.

Section lines are frequently observed in antique Oriental carpets, especially in Anatolian rugs of village or rural production, as well as in traditional Navajo weaving.

== Technical details ==
A smaller rug can be woven continuously by fitting in one line of pile knots around the longitudinal warp threads, followed by the introduction of one or more threads of the weft (or filling yarn) which then span the entire width of the loom. When working on a broader loom, the weaver may decide to build up the area within easy reach first and then move sidewards and complete the rest. The wefts are wound back around single warps at the borders of the respective area. If the weft is always turned around the same warp, a slit will appear in the fabric, as seen in kilims. By winding the weft around different warps, ascending or descending diagonally as the work proceeds, the different areas are joined. This diagonal line forms the "lazy", or "section" line. The use of the lazy line technique results in a tight fabric without any open slits.

== Use in rug design ==
Section lines are not visible in a rug which still has its full pile, as the pile threads cover the foundation. However, if the wefts are dyed to match the colour of the respective pile area, the foundation of the rug may not shine through once the pile has become worn with use. In the flatwoven, pile-less Navajo textiles, the technique may also be used to enhance certain areas or patterns, and thus contribute to the overall design.

As lazy lines result from an individual weaving process, they are not easily reproduced or forged. Thus, the detection of lazy lines in a rug supposed to be antique is regarded as a sign of authenticity.
