= Sighișoara City Hall =

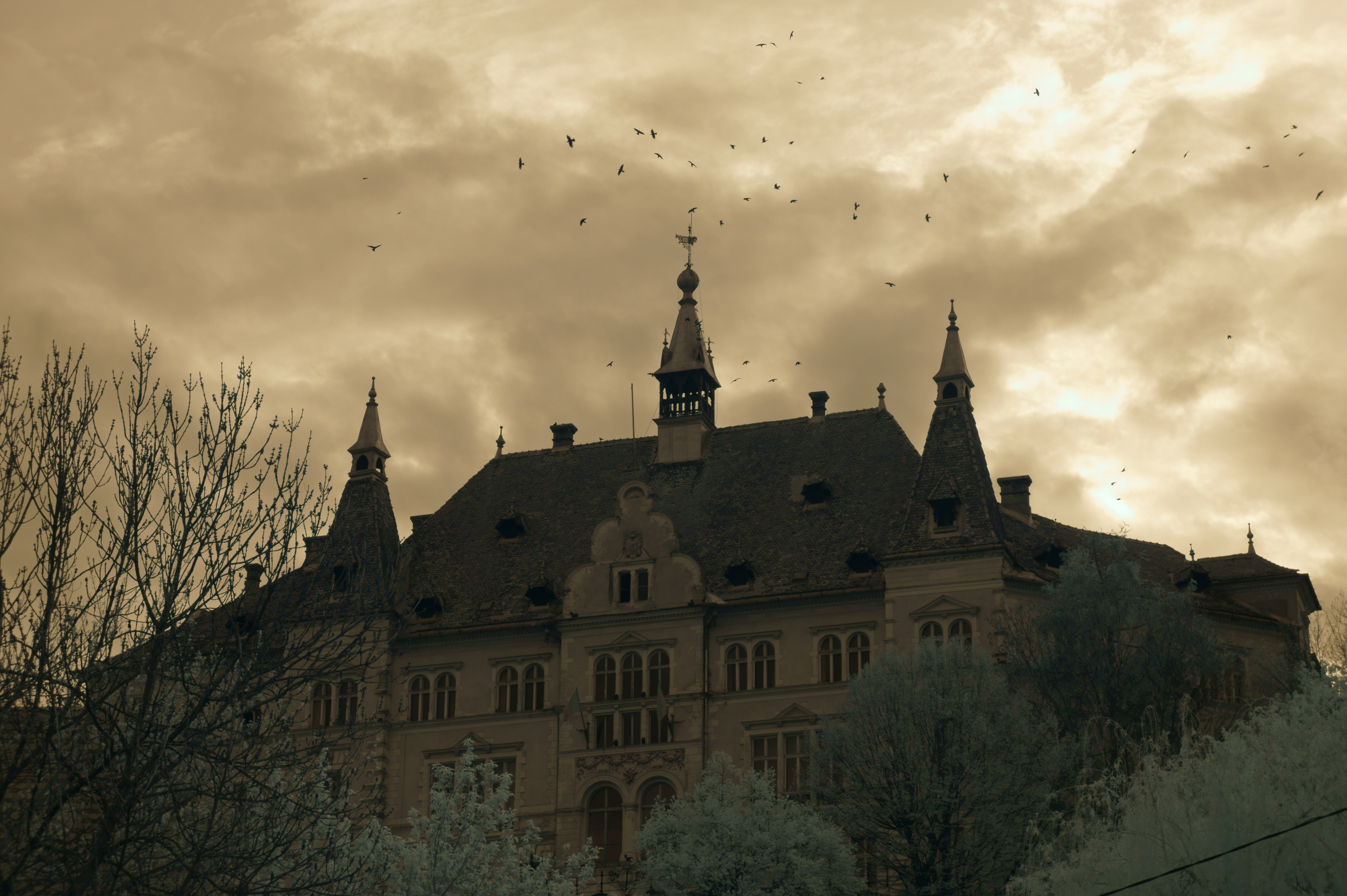
City hall

The City Hall of Sighişoara, Romania, is located near to Monastery Church. The building was built between 1887 and 1888. In the upper floor there is a baroque hall, which hosts an Academic Music festival and many other concerts of prestigious bands.
