= Ironsmiths' Tower =

The Ironsmiths' Tower

The Ironsmiths' Tower (Romanian: Turnul Fierarilor, German: Schmiedeturm) is located behind the Monastery Church of Sighişoara, in Mureș County, Romania. Its main role was to protect the church in case of a siege. It was built in 1631 on the foundations of the old Barber's Tower. From inside the citadel it appears relatively small, but is impressive when viewed from the exterior of the wall.

The tower has a trapezoidal ground plan and dominates with its bulk the entire North-east side of the citadel fortification. It is a flanking tower stuck to the wall of the fortress. At the top there are two defence floors provided with arrow slits. As it has remarkably strong roof framework, it is supposed that it was also used for the storage of weaponry. At the time of construction there was apparently also an artillery bulwark connecting the Ironsmiths' Tower to the Barrelmakers' Tower, but this was pulled down later.

In 1680 General Registry stated that in the tower were found six arquebuses: one of which double, three medium and two small; three pistols, one musket, seven lances, three hundred pounds of lead and another three hundred pounds of gunpowder.

After the tower lost its strategic importance, it was rented out for storage and later on, in 1874, it became a fire station. During this period drastic alterations were made to its interior.
