= Transylvanian rugs =

Islamic rugs used as decoration of Transylvanian Protestant churches

The name Transylvanian rug is used as a term of convenience to denote a cultural heritage of Islamic and Oriental rugs dating back to the 15th century, consisting of imported and locally-made rugs. The tradition originated in the historical Ottoman Principality of Transylvania. These rugs are frequently preserved in ethnic Hungarian churches in Transylvania. The corpus of Transylvanian rugs of Anatolian origin constitutes one of the largest collections of Ottoman Anatolian rugs outside the Islamic world.

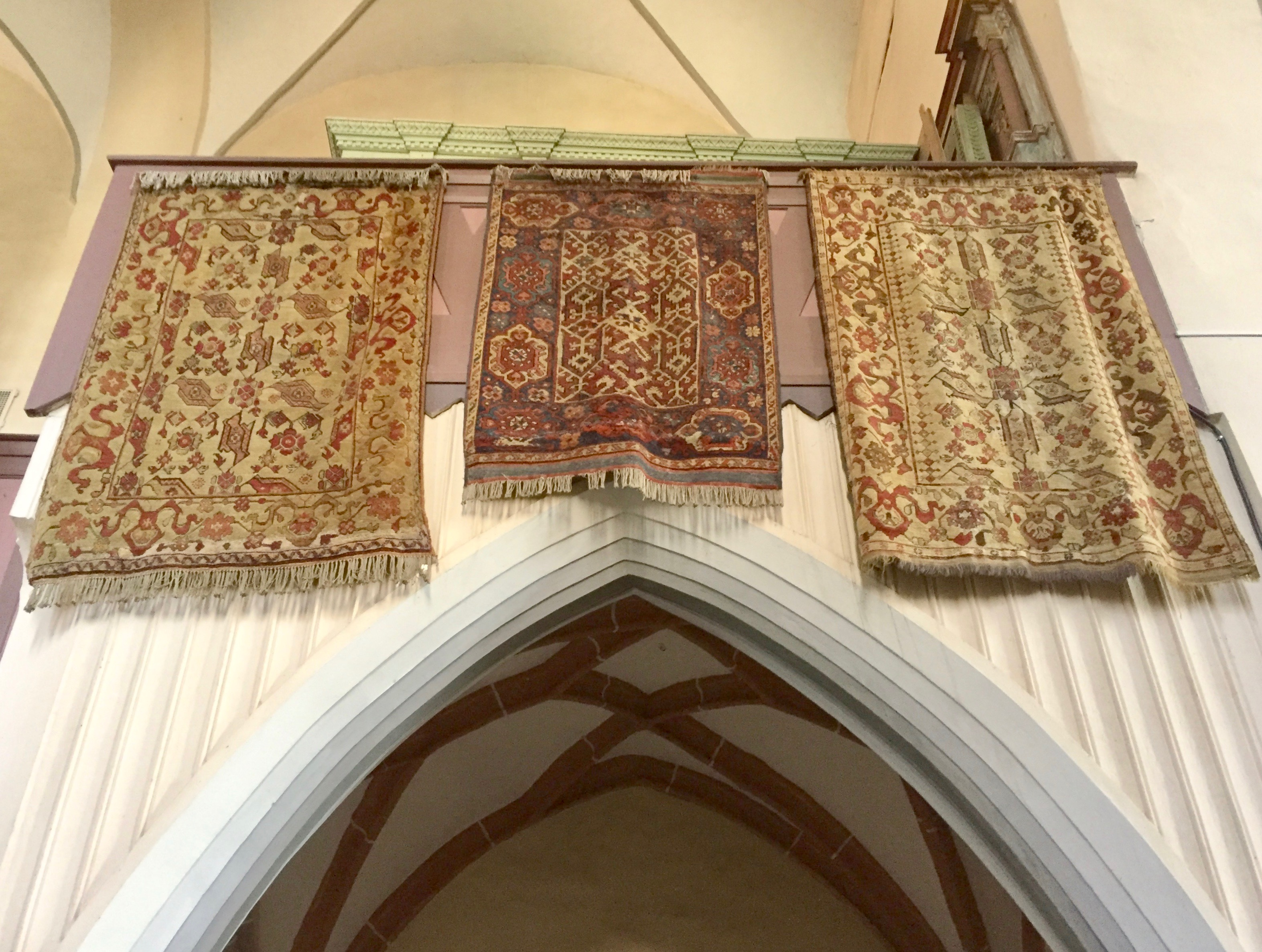
Transylvanian rugs of the "Lotto" and "Bird" type in the Monastery Church of Sighișoara, Romania. Northern wall of the nave, 2017.

== Types of "Transylvanian" Ottoman rugs ==
Amongst the rugs preserved in Transylvania are classical Turkish carpets like Holbein, Lotto, and so-called "white ground" Selendi or Ushak carpets.

=== Single-niche rugs ===
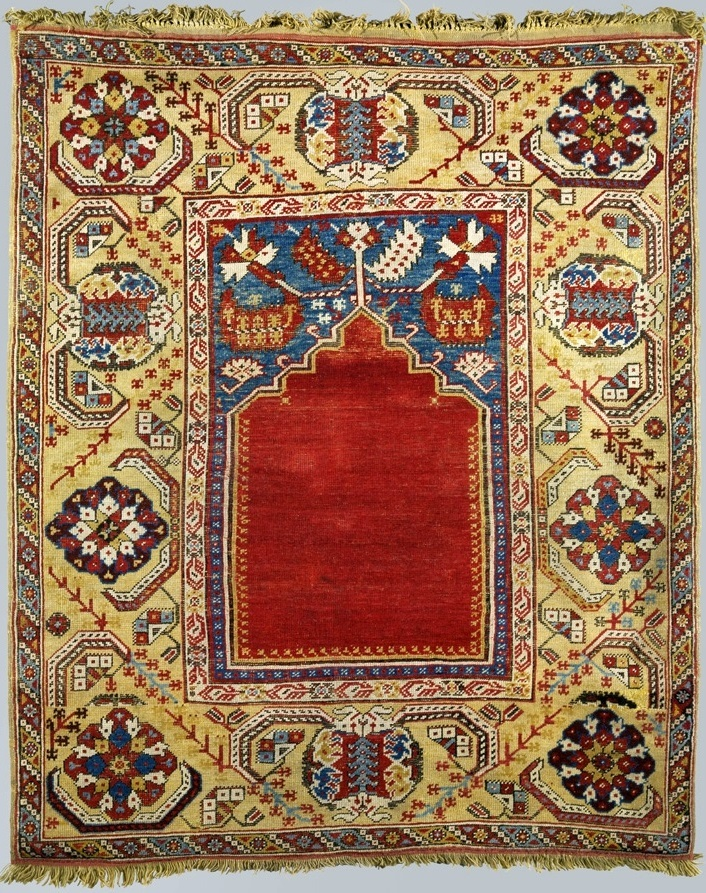
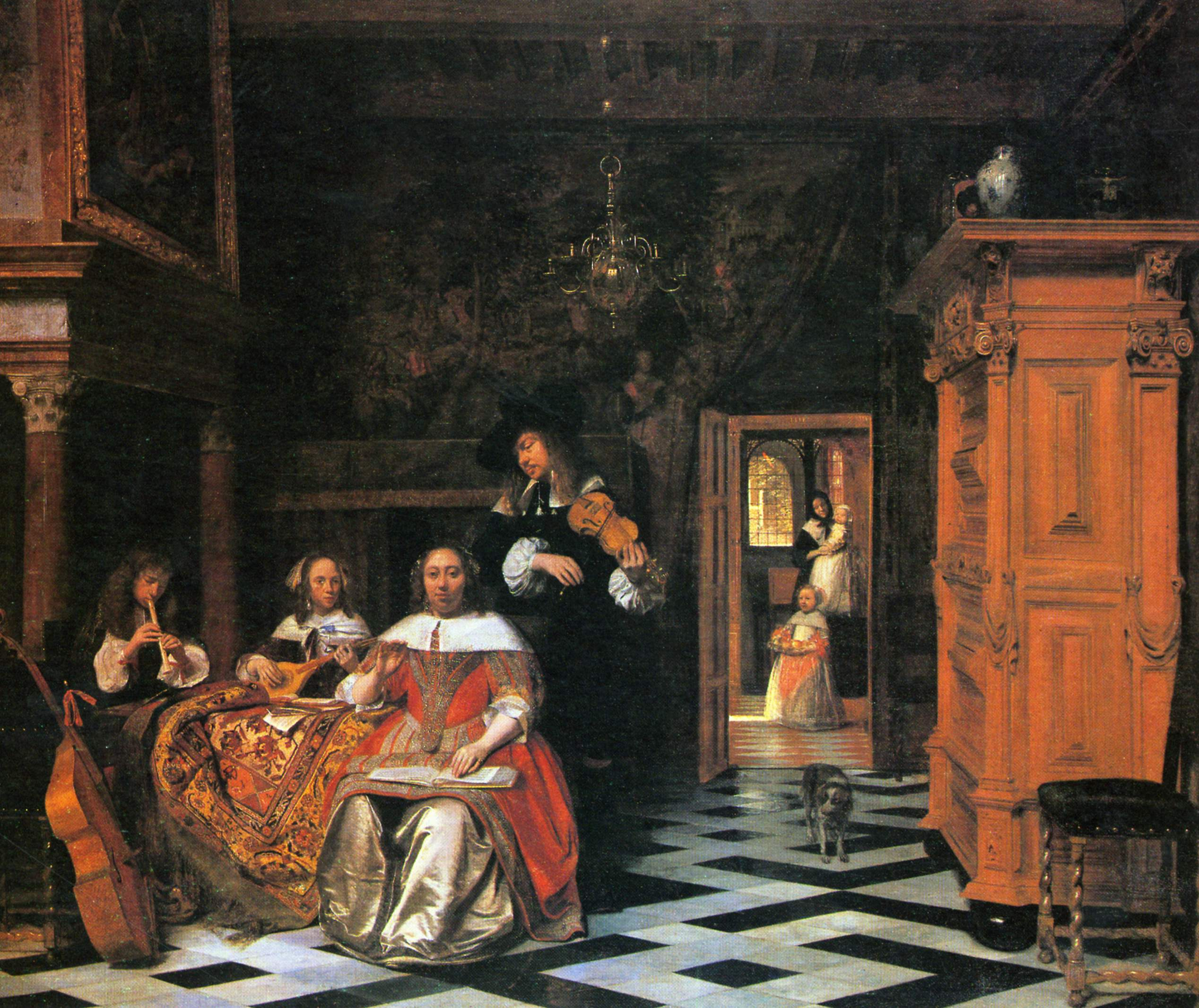
Left image: Prayer rug, 18th century, National Museum, Warsaw
Right image: Pieter de Hooch: Portrait of a family making music, 1663, Cleveland Museum of Art

Transylvanian rugs with a prayer rug design are characterized by a single red niche, white spandrels with a waving curvilinear floral stem bearing various kinds of flowers and flowerbuds, and ochre yellow borders with curvilinear patterns. The fields are usually ochre, sometimes red. It is almost always empty of additional ornaments, with the exception of small floral ornaments close to the edge or in place of a mosque lamp at the top of the niche. The niche itself shows design types also known from Ottoman prayer rugs from Anatolia: the "head and shoulder" design, high or low point of the arch, and with serrated or stepped outlines. The similarities of the design with their Anatolian counterparts has led to the attribution of specific Transylvanian carpets to more specific Anatolian proveniences like Ghiordes or Melas. The design is related to the Ottoman court prayer rugs of the second half of the sixteenth century. A carpet of this type is depicted in Pieter de Hoochs 1663 painting "Portrait of a family making music".

A small group of rugs with a markedly similar prayer rug design closely resembles the "double-niche" type with a vase motif, with the difference that there is only one single niche. The decoration of the field, the profile of the niche, the design of the spandrels and borders differ from other rugs with prayer rug design.

=== Double-niche rugs ===
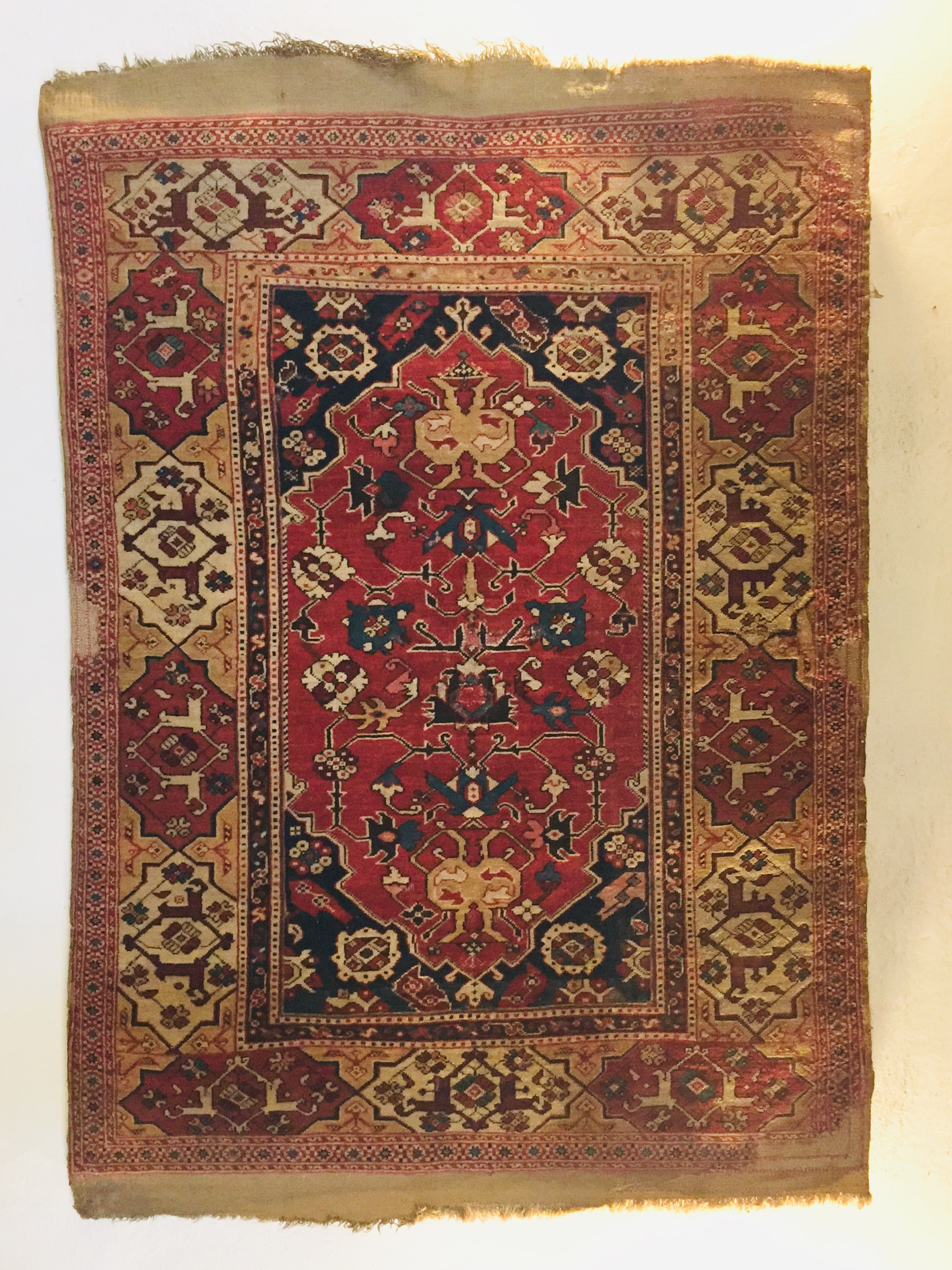
Double niche rug from a church in Brașov County, Transylvania

Around 100 rugs with double niches are known from Transylvania. Usually their format is small, with borders of oblong, angular cartouches whose centers are filled with stylized, counterchanging floral motifs, sometimes interspersed with shorter stellated rosettes or cartouches. The first depiction of rugs with this border design appears in Netherlandish paintings of the early seventeenth century. The 1620 "Portrait of Abraham Graphaeus" by Cornelis de Vos, and Thomas de Keysers "Portrait of an unknown man" (1626) and "Portrait of Constantijn Huyghens and his clerk" (1627) are among the earliest paintings depicting rugs of the "Transylvanian double-niche" type. In Transylvania, the first references to this design type date from around 1620, and the earliest carpets of this type with inscriptions are dated between 1661 and 1675.

A smaller group within the double-niche type has a niche, or arch-like form at both ends of the field, which is formed by two separate corner medallions. The medallion corners are decorated with interlacing arabesques resembling similar design types known from "double niche" Ushak carpets, but with a slightly stiffer design. The majority of Transylvanian double-niche rugs are characterized by more heavily stylized corner pieces which are best described as spandrels to a niche, as the separation of the two corner medallions is no longer visible. In the center of these spandrels often stands a larger, plain rosette, while the remaining space is filled with rather crude ornaments. Their field sometimes shows two pairs of vases with undulating motifs in opposing colours. The field is decorated with small floral ornaments, which are drawn in an elaborate, curvilinear manner in earlier examples, and become more stiff and schematic in later pieces. The design is always symmetrically arranged towards the vertical axis. Double-niche Transylvanian carpets with a central medallion sometimes have a medallion design which closely resembles those seen in Ushak rugs. In other, probably later examples, the field decor is condensed into medallions of concentric lozenges and rows of eight-petalled flowers connected by projecting stems of curled leaves. Often central medallions of this type contain a central cruciform ornament. The ground colour is yellow, red, or dark blue.

The observation that two different types of corner design exist in parallel does not necessarily imply that one type has developed out of the other. It has been suggested that the double-niche design was developed out of the single-niche design by symmetric mirroring along a central horizontal axis: In some of the double-niche rugs, e.g., a mid-17th century rug in the Black Church collection (Inv. 257), one niche is more elaborately executed and ornamented than the other. Its apex is accentuated by a "head-and-shoulder" design which is not mirrored in the other niche. In some pieces, the addition of a transverse panel accentuates the impression of a directional design.

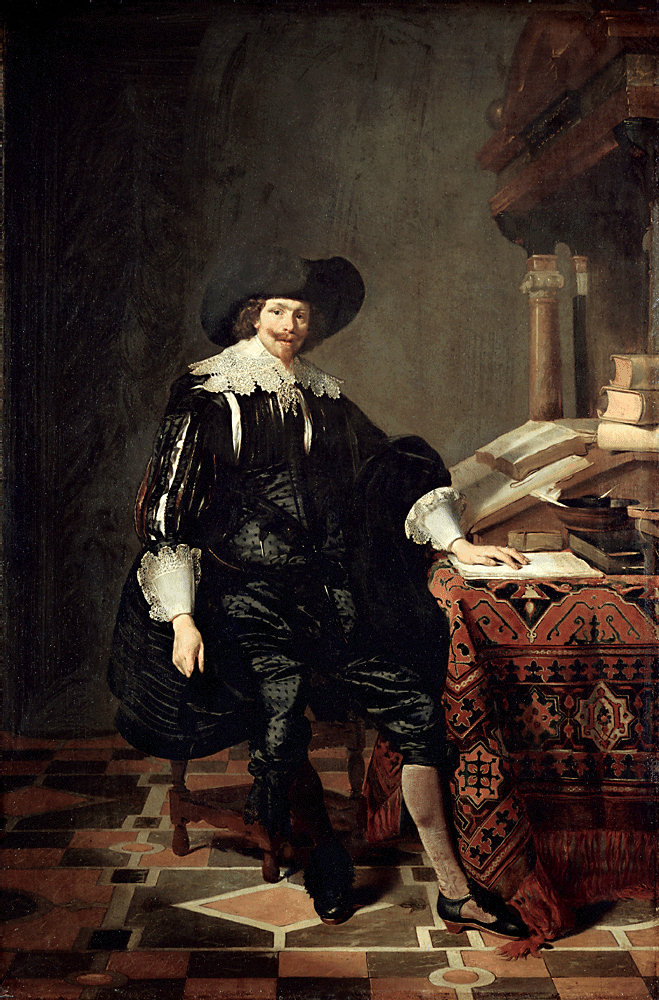
Thomas de Keyser - Portrait of an unknown man, 1626, Louvre

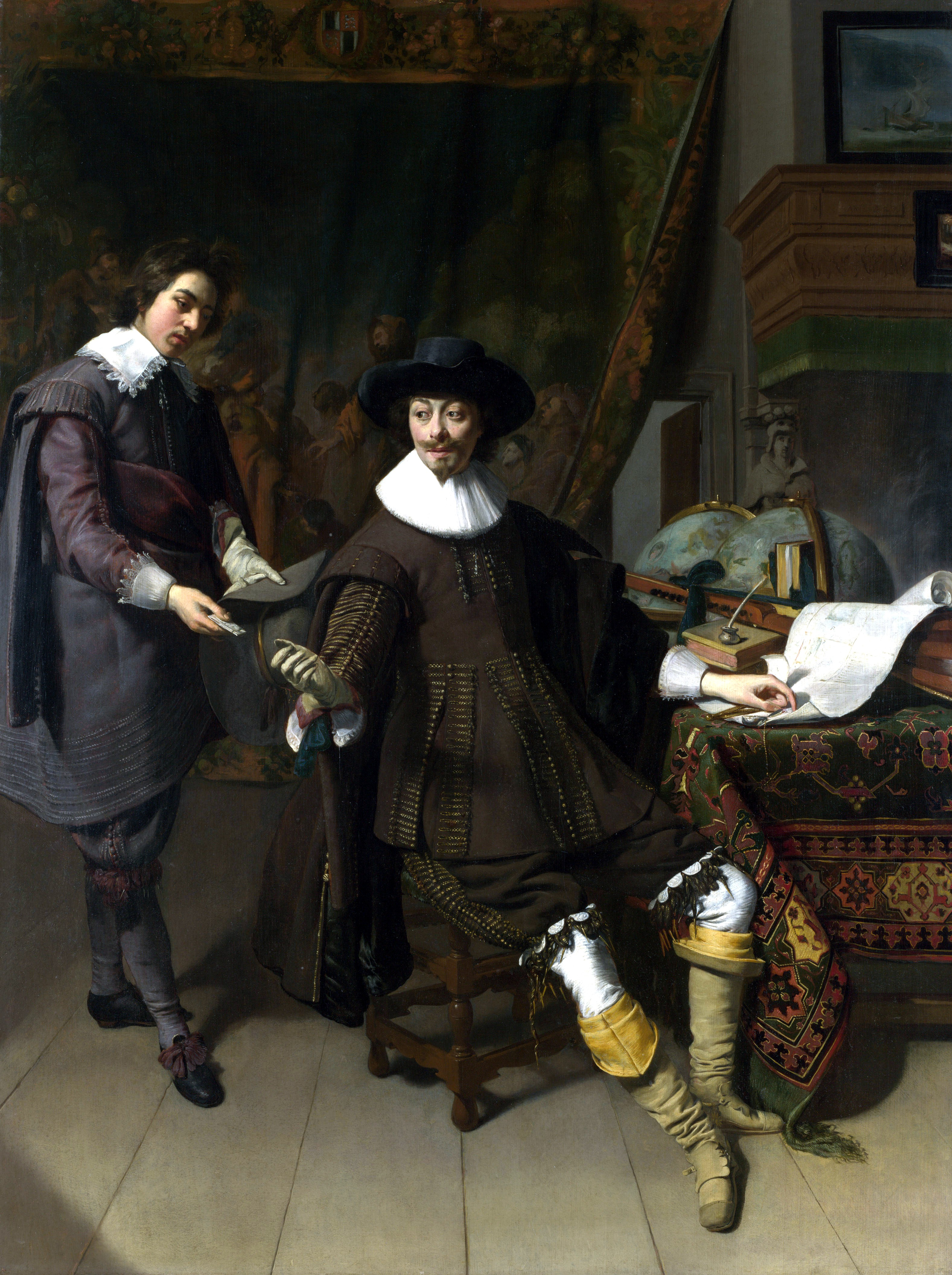
Thomas de Keyser - Portrait of Constantijn Huygens and his clerk, 1627, National Gallery

=== Column rugs ===
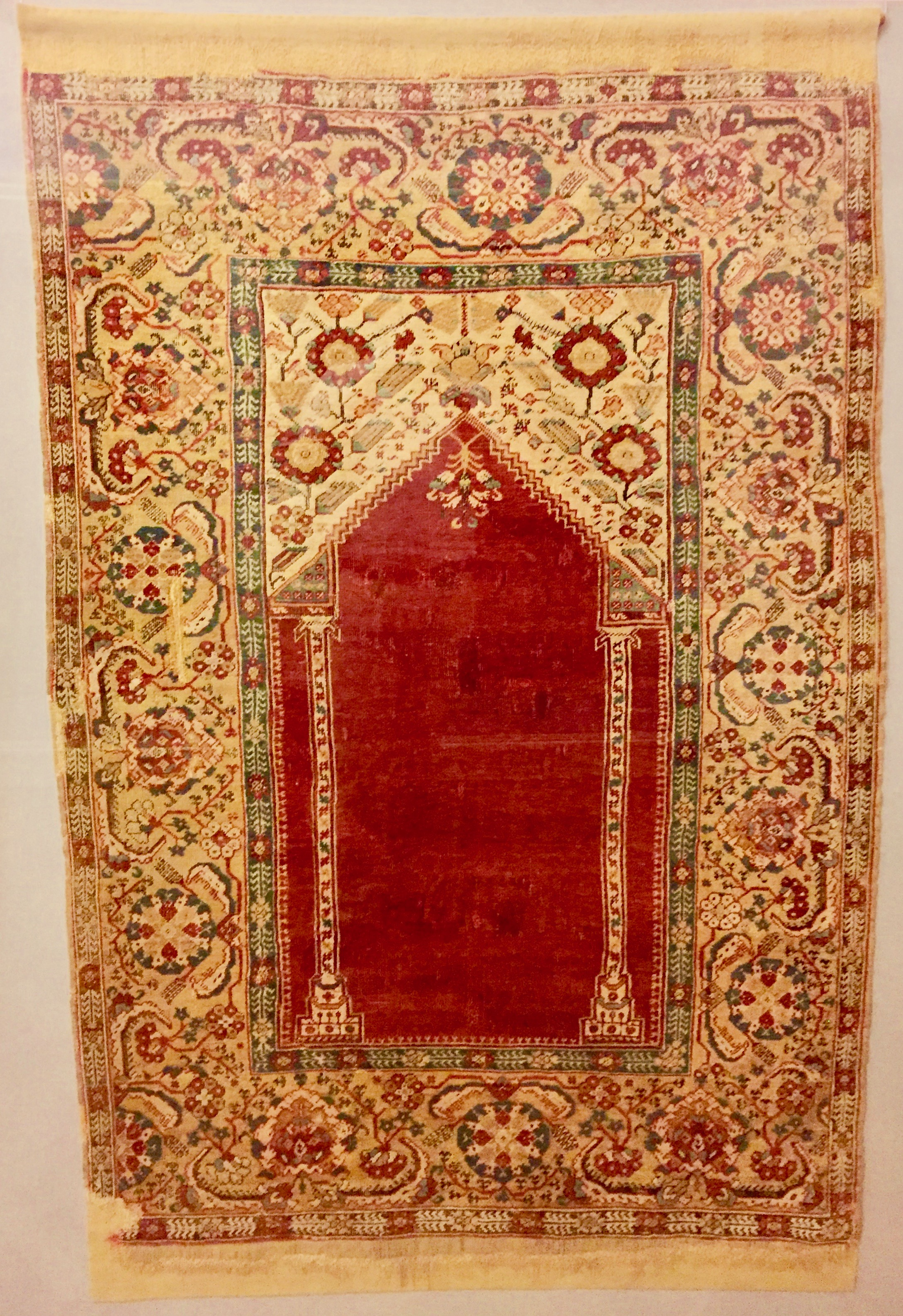
Rug with single niche and two columns. Brukenthal National Museum

Column rugs are characterized by column motifs supporting an architectural structure, most often an arch. In later examples, the architectural elements undergo a process of stylization and change into decorative elements like floral bands or scrolls. This process is well documented for the process by which Ottoman court manufacture designs have been integrated into rural village and nomadic designs. Consequently, the Transylvanian column rugs resemble rugs from Anatolian production centers like Ghiordes, Kula, Ladik, and Karapinar. Column rugs with a single-arched niche have spandrels decorated with flowering-stem patterns on an ivory ground. The arch may be rounded or serrated. Examples are known with more than two columns. Generally, the plinths are well drawn. The colour of the field is red or ochre, and the borders show floral patterns.

== Historical and cultural context ==
The cultural heritage of the Transylvanian rugs owes its existence to a variety of geographical, economic, and political factors:

1. The political position of the Hungarian ruled Principality of Transylvania between the dominant political powers of the time: The Christian monarchies of Hungary and, later, Habsburg and the Islamic Ottoman Empire;
2. The geographical situation of the area, located on an important trade route between East and West;
3. The fact that their art historical and material value was not commonly recognised when antique rugs were removed and sold from Western European churches.

Due to its geographical position, Transylvania was an important trade center between East and West during the 15th–17th century. Pile woven carpets from Anatolian manufacturers were part of the merchandise, and were traded in large numbers. Anatolian carpets were also appreciated as objects of high value and prestige, and collected as such by Transylvanian municipalities and individual persons. Inscriptions on the rugs and church records prove that rugs and carpets were donated as decorative wall and pew furnishings to Protestant churches. By their preservation in Christian churches, the rugs were protected from wear and the changes of history, and often remain in excellent condition today.

=== Long-distance trade with the Ottoman Empire ===
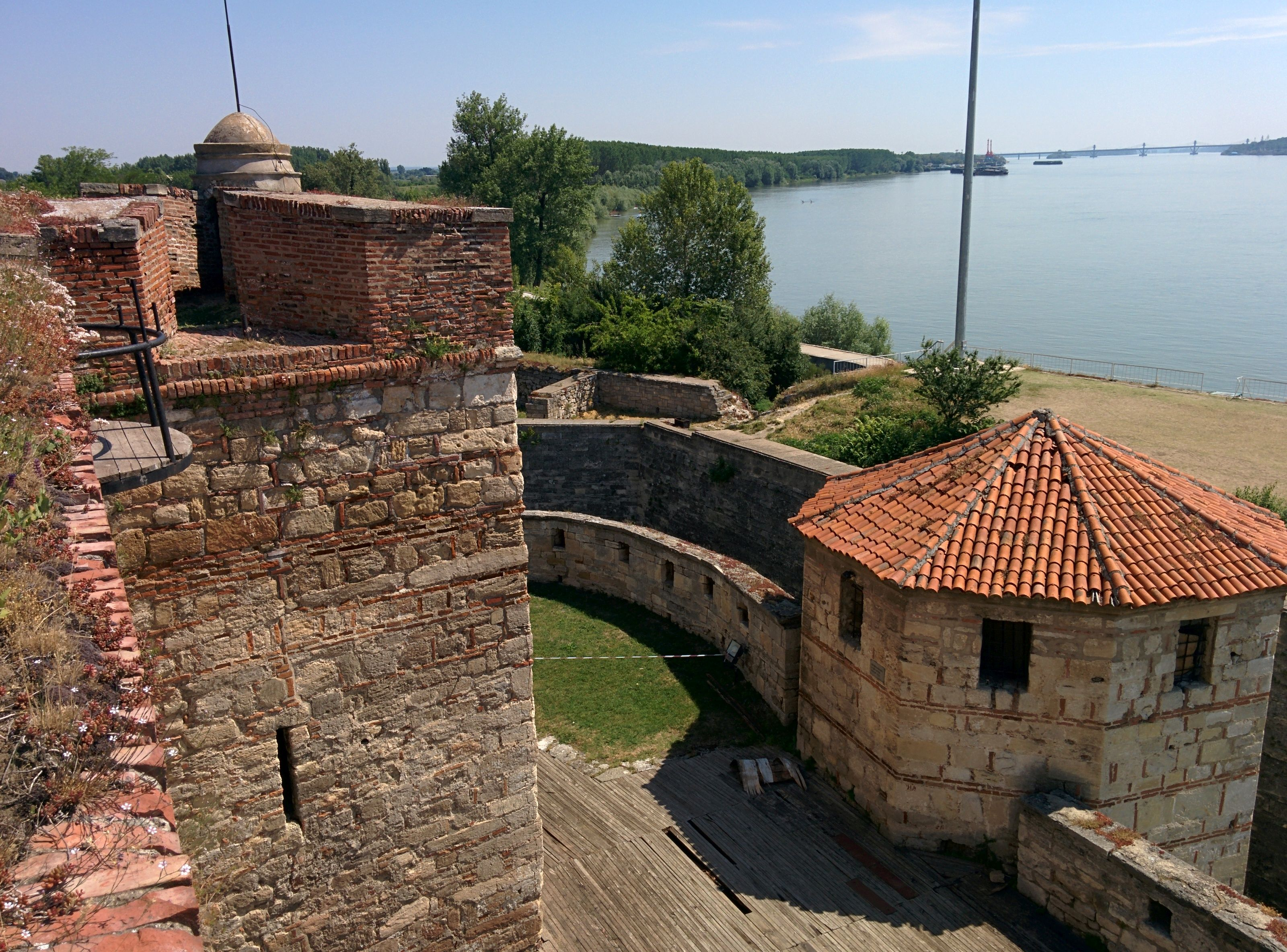
The Danube seen from the fortress of Vidin

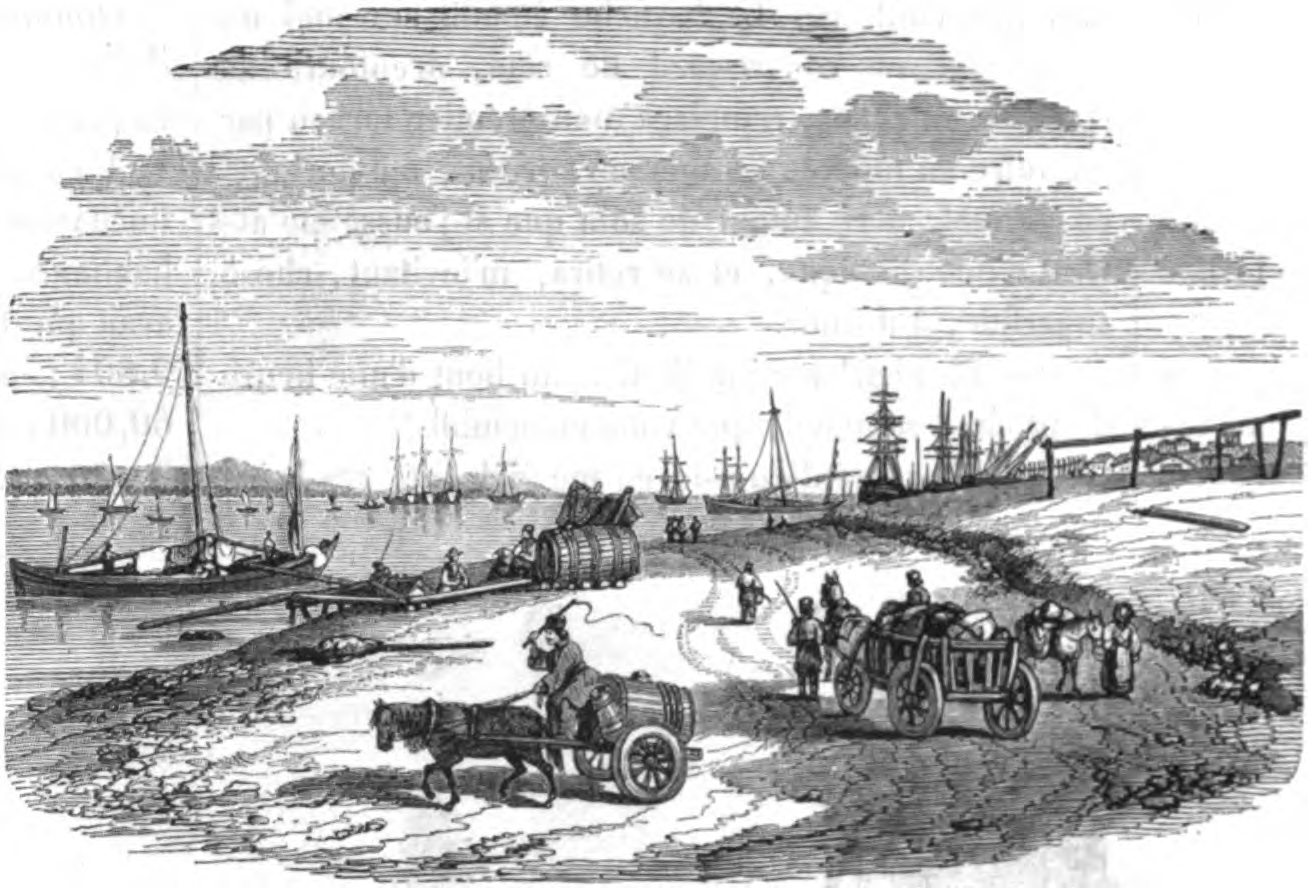
The port of Brăila in the 1840s

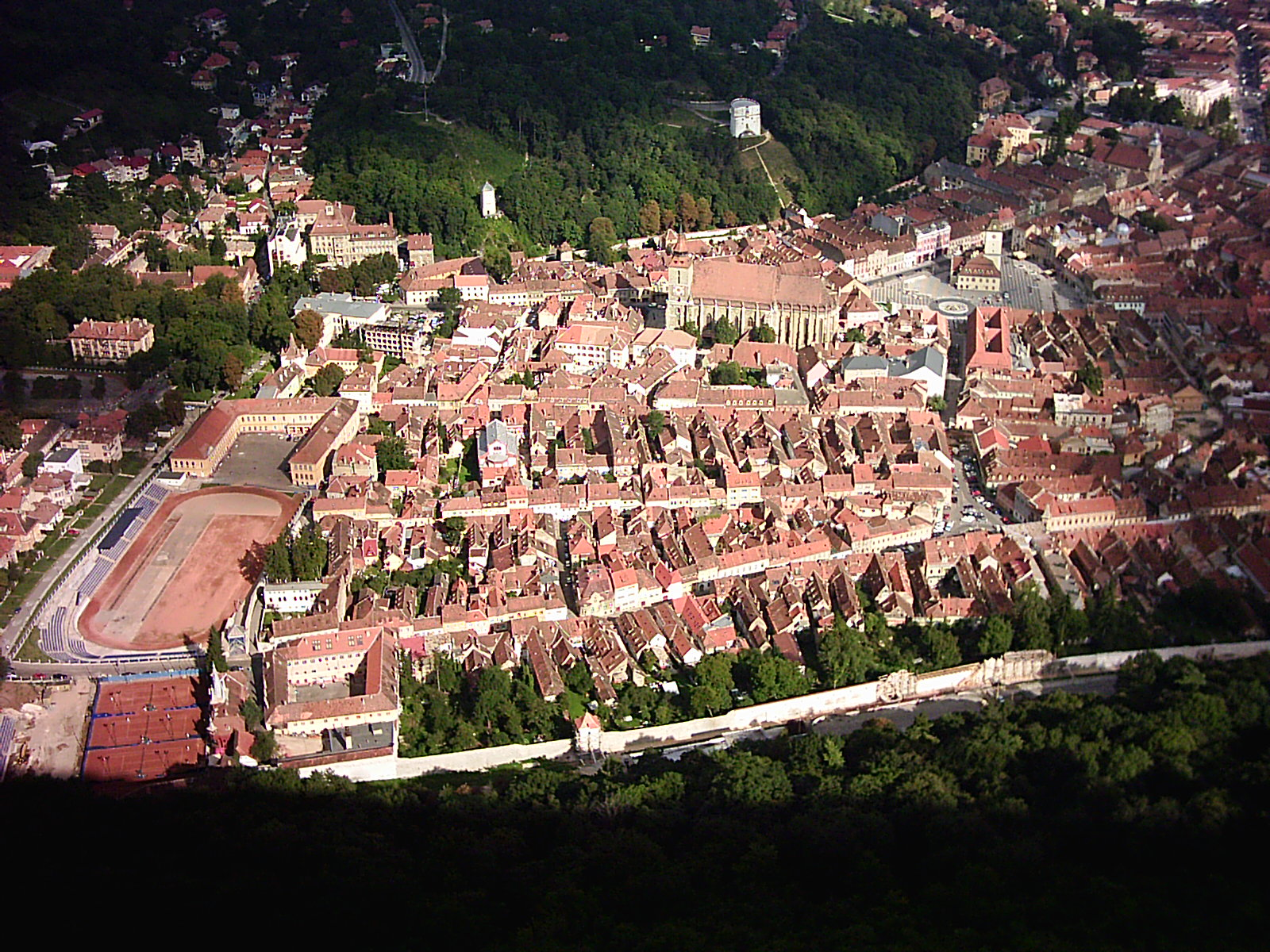
Braşov, with the Black Church and the old city hall

Despite political rivalries, trade relationships intensified between the Ottoman Empire, Eastern Central Europe and South Germany from 1400 onwards. By the middle of the 14th century, the Hungarian kings Louis I of Hungary and Sigismund had agreed on commercial treaties with the Republic of Genoa. Thus they obtained direct access to the Genoese trade post of Pera. Using the trade route across the Black Sea to the Danube ports, merchandise from the Levant reached its European destinations faster and cheaper, as compared to the Mediterranean trade routes dominated by the Republic of Venice. Apart from the political aspects, the struggle for power between the Hungarian and Ottoman monarchies in Wallachia and the southern parts of Bulgaria was also economically motivated: The Ottoman conquest of 1393 provided direct access for Ottoman merchants to the southern European market. When peace was agreed upon in 1429, the Wallachian voivode Dan II immediately asked the merchants of Braşov to resume their activities. From the mid-15th century onwards, the number of Ottoman merchants, called saracenos (Saracens) in the Braşov documents, steadily increased.

The merchandise was transported via the so-called "Bursa-Braşov route", first by ship across the Black Sea and over the Danube to the ports of Brăila (which was first ever mentioned in a 1368 trade privilege granted to merchants from Braşov), Silistra, Rusçuk, Nikopolis, Vidin (where Ivan Sratsimir had granted trade privileges to Braşov) or Smederevo. Wallachian or Transylvanian merchants then transported their goods across the Carpathian Mountains to Braşov and further on to Hungary. During the 15th century, the Transylvanian town developed into a major reloading point of the Oriental trade. By the end of the 15th century, the Braşov customs registers used to document the value of the merchandise not only in Venetian Florins, but also in Ottoman Akçe, which underlines the importance of the far-distance trade with the Ottoman Empire for the Transylvanian economy. Also, imported goods from the Ottoman Empire, like pepper or silk, are registered by their Ottoman weights. In the 16th century, the two major oriental trade routes connected in Transylvania: One supplying Vienna and Krakow from Venice, and the overland route through the Balkans.

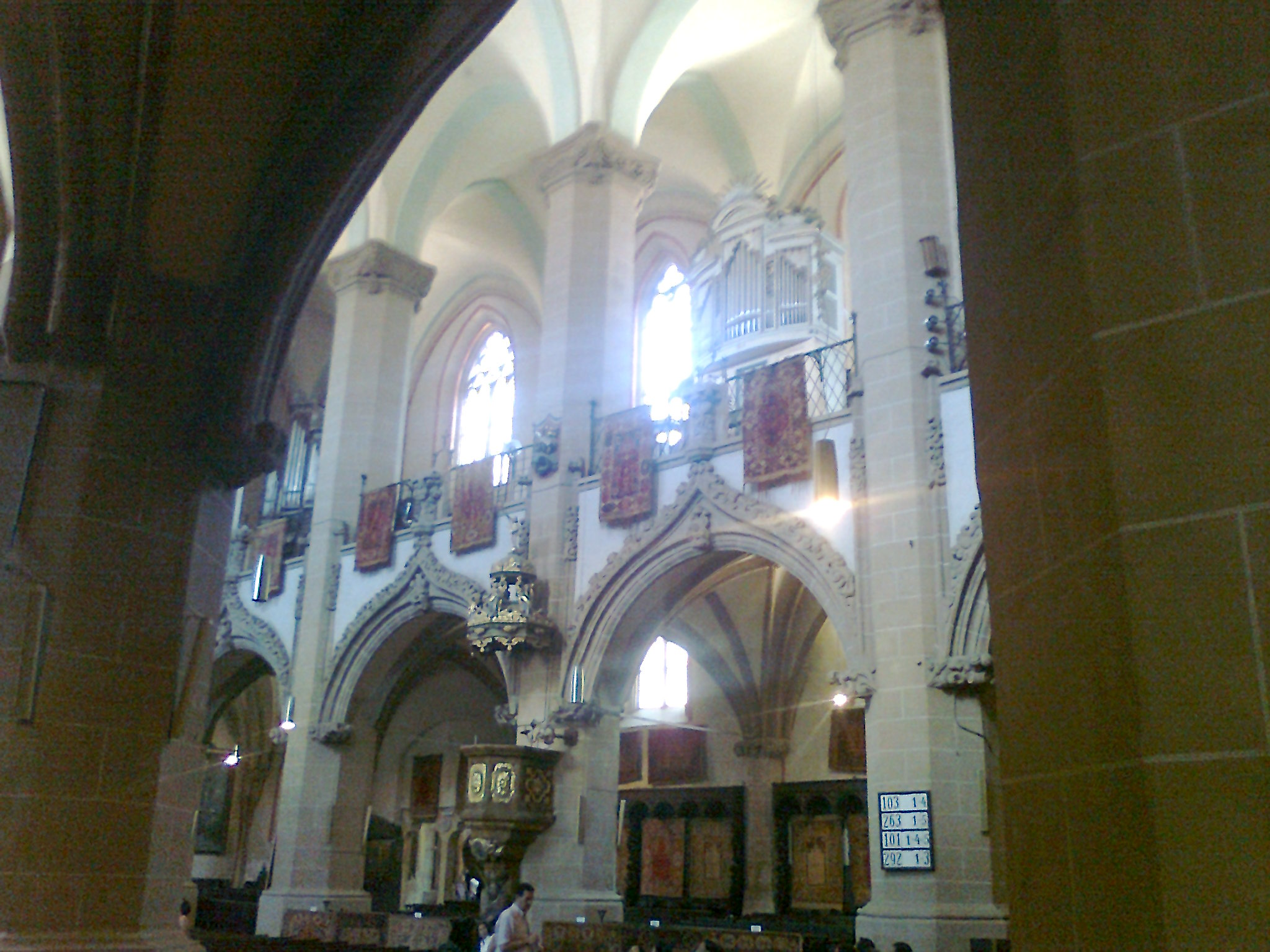
Nave of the Black Church, Braşov.

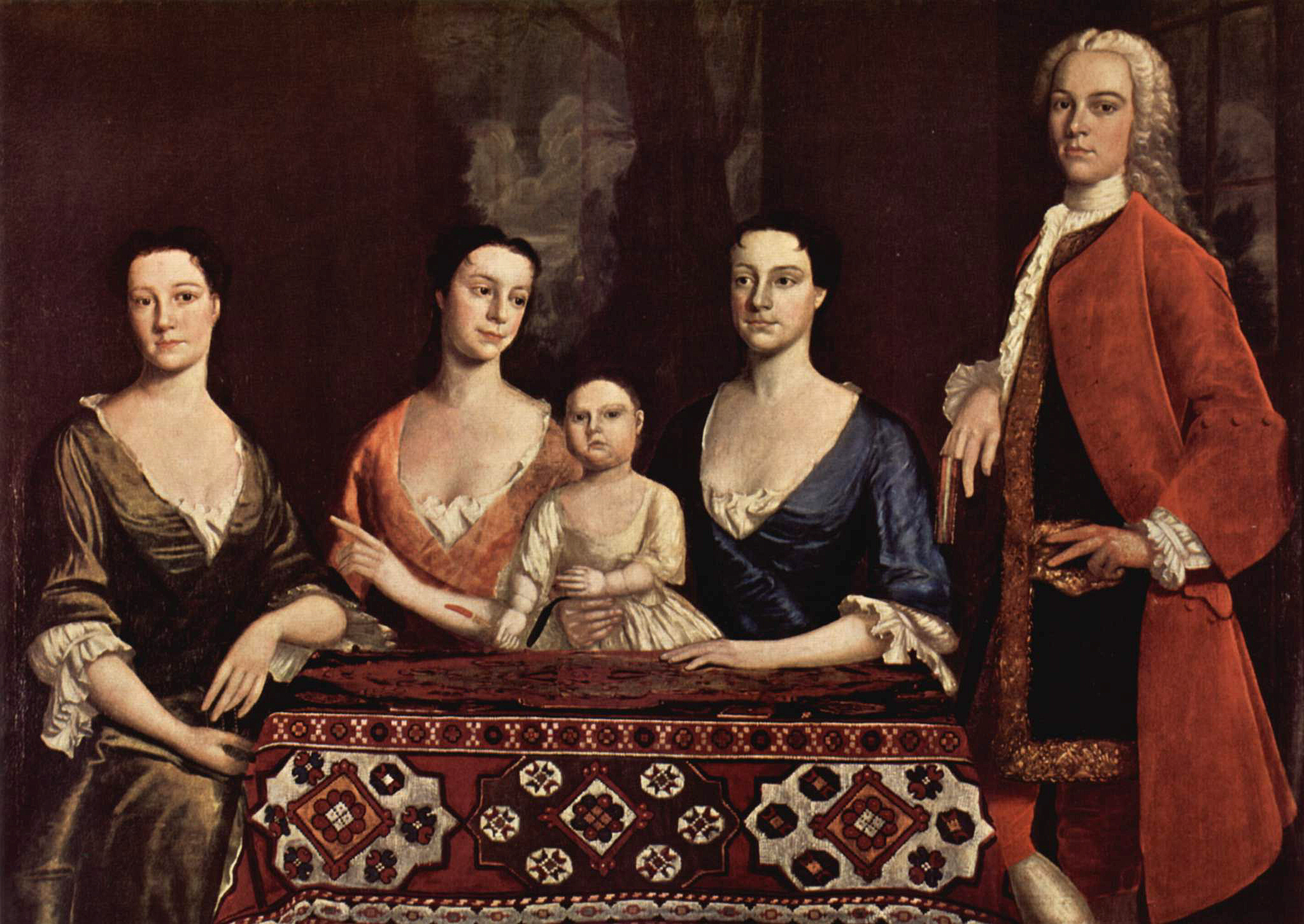
Robert Feke, Isaac Royall and Family (Boston, 1741)

Value of trade goods declared in Braşov, in Florin, 1484–1600
Year	total	Merchandise for export and transit	Oriental merchandise in transit
1484–85	65.000	–	–
1503	167.000	60.000	85.000
1515	100.0000	–	–
1542	80.000	23.000	41.000
1550	70.000	19.000	20.000
1554	82.000	23.000	32.000
1600	60.000	–	–

Pile-woven rugs from Asia minor were known in Western Europe since the Renaissance: They were depicted by European painters from the 14th century onwards. Organized trade between the Romanian countries and the Ottoman Empire began with Sultan Mehmed II's decree of 1456, granting Moldavian merchants the right to travel to Constantinople for trade. An Ottoman customs register from Caffa dating from 1487 to 1491 documents rugs from the Anatolian town of Uşak as trade goods. A price register ("narh defter") from 1640 lists ten different types of rugs from Uşak and Selendi. A rug with a typical Transylvanian cartouche border appears on Robert Fekes painting Isaac Royall and Family (Boston, 1741). It demonstrates that at least one Anatolian rug of ″Transylvanian″ design made its way to North America in the mid-18th century.

The first known document from Brașov related to rug trade was written between 1462 and 1464. Vigesimal accounts for various towns are preserved and bear evidence of the large amount of carpets transported through Transylvania. The extent of this trade can be judged from the Braşov vigesimal (customs) register of 1503, which recorded the declaration of more than 500 rugs within one single year. However, Pakucs-Willcocks (2014) argues that in 1503 the trade volume may have been exceptionally large because the usual trade route via Venice was temporarily cut off during the Ottoman–Venetian War (1499–1503).

=== Role of Islamic rugs in the Saxon culture ===
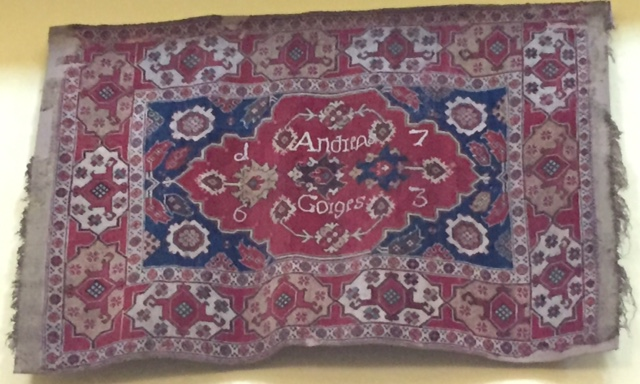
"Transylvanian" double-niche rug with embroidered inscription, Ev.-Luth. church of Râșnov, Romania

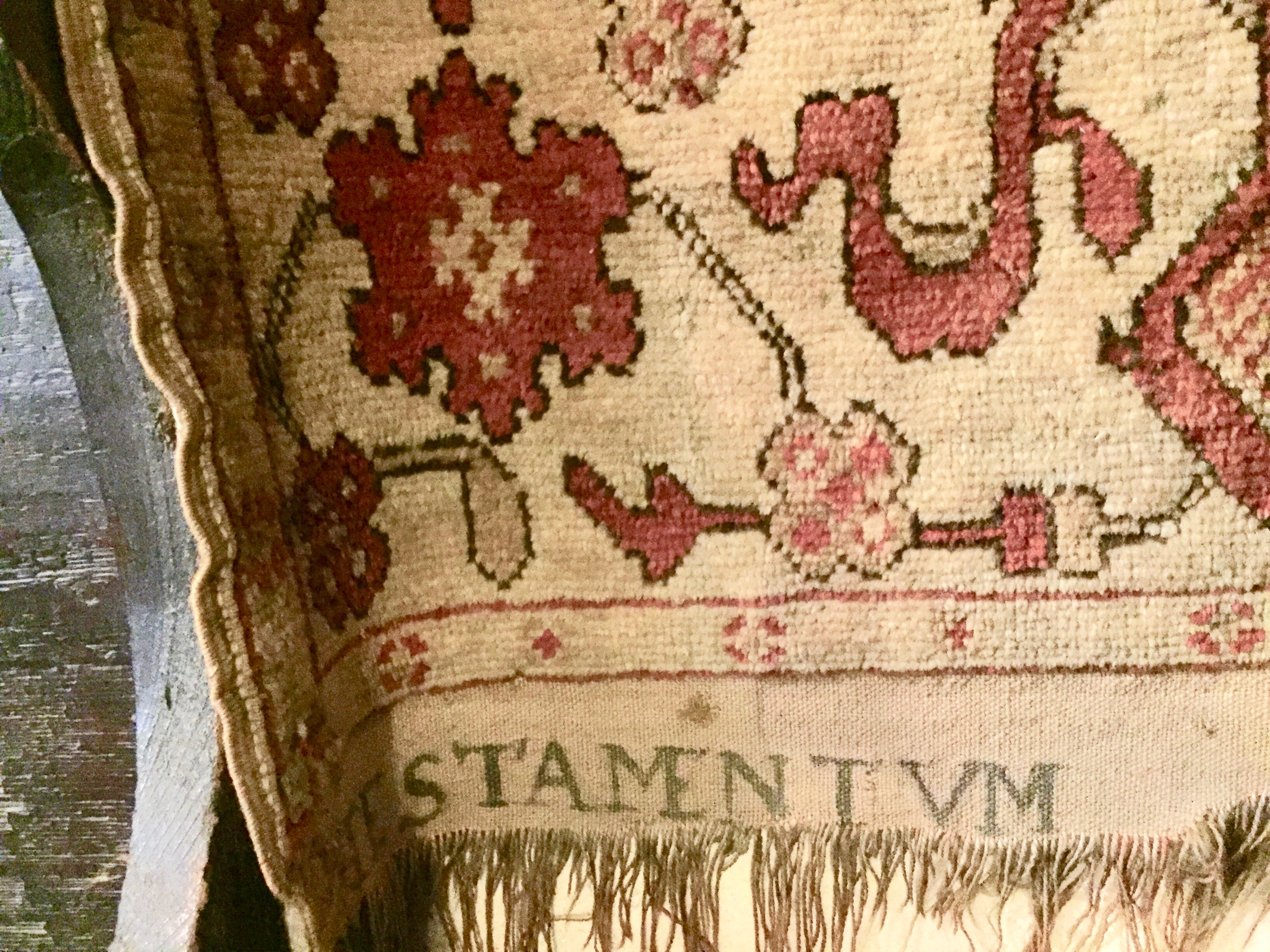
Inscription (ink) on a "Transylvanian" rug in the Monastery Church of Sighișoara, Romania: "TESTAMENTVM..." – "The will..."

The role of Anatolian rugs as trade goods of high value and prestigious collectibles is documented in the merchant accreditations, vigesimal accounts, municipal and church annals as well as individual contracts and wills, archived in the Transylvanian towns. The municipalities and other institutions of the Saxon towns, persons of nobility and public influence, as well as citizens were owners of Ottoman rugs. The towns acquired rugs either as customs duty paid in like, or purchased rugs from the trade. Rugs were frequently offered to public persons as a gift of honour. It has been estimated that from 1500 to 1700 over one thousand rugs were used as gifts from the municipality of Brașov alone. cited after Rugs were used to mark the place of individual persons, or members of a guild, in church. There is also evidence of collections owned by private persons. Contracts specify that the rugs were hung on the walls of private homes for decoration. As such, rugs were used to confirm the social status of the owner, but the reports also confirm that the carpets were perceived as objects of beauty and art. The Transylvanian Saxons referred to them as "Kirchenteppiche" ("church rugs").

The fact that the group of Transylvanian single-niche rugs represent the classic pattern of Islamic prayer rugs has been subject to scientific discussions and speculation. In some of the rugs, Islamic religious inscriptions in Arabic calligraphy are woven into the pile which clearly evokes a religious context. An edict issued by sultan Ahmed I to the town of Kütahya in 1610 demonstrates that the Ottomans were aware of this issue. Referring to a fatwa by the Şeyhülislam, the sultan banned the sale of rugs "with depictions of mihrab, kaaba or hat (calligraphy)" to non-Muslims. In contrast, the term "prayer rug" or any relation to the religious significance of these goods was never found in Transylvanian sources, as yet. Only their material value as a good of luxury, and their purely ornamental, non-figural design seems to have made these rugs appear as appropriate adornments of Protestant churches. A report about the great fire which had destroyed the Black Church of Brașov in 1689 mentions the loss of a large rug which "according to legend was woven by St. Paul the Apostle (who was a rug weaver by profession)" It seems likely that the Christian owners of the rugs did not understand the original Islamic context, but created a new legendary context around these objects.

In 2019, the historians Á. and F. Ziegler from Brașov demonstrated that, in contrast to previous opinion, Ottoman rugs were not on permanent display in the Black Church. Until then, it was assumed that their ornamental, non-figural design allowed Islamic rugs to fill in the horror vacui, supposedly created by the 16th century iconoclastic fury. Until and through the 19th century, the Saxon parishes followed Martin Luther's moderate theology, which did not encourage radical iconoclasm in sacred spaces. Thus, the "Kirchenteppiche" ("Church rugs") remained in storage and were put on display only on special occasions, e.g., for Sunday service. A rug may then have adorned the pulpit, thus accentuating one focus of the Lutheran Sunday service. Likewise, contemporary testaments as well as inscriptions on the rugs themselves confirm that it was custom for guilds to collectively procure their own rugs. On Sundays and religious holidays, the rugs were displayed on the respective guild's bench or pews. Thus, the rugs served as a means of asserting their owners' wealth and status. A multitude of contemporary sources bear witness to the use of rugs as decorative backgrounds of important social events like baptisms, marriages, or funerals. In the Black Church, a special official, the "Warner", was to make sure that the decoration was exactly as was perceived appropriate considering the social status of the participants. The 2019 study demonstrates that an Islamic rug may find its entry into an entirely different cultural context, and thus contribute to creating a cultural identity which differs markedly from its original.

=== Rediscovery ===
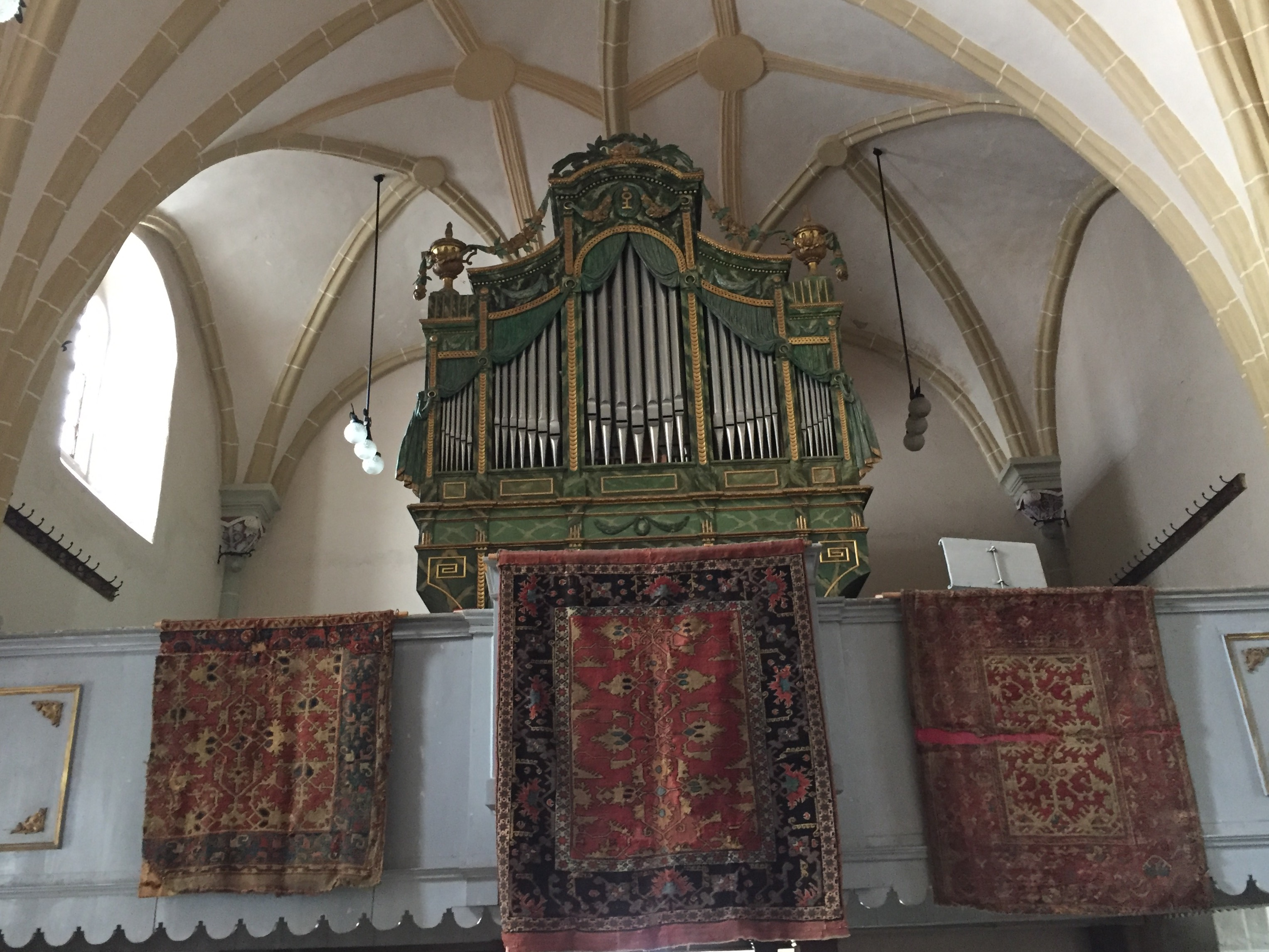
"Lotto" rugs in the fortified church of Hărman, Brașov county, Romania, 2017

By the end of the nineteenth century, the collecting of antique rugs had become fashionable both in Western Europe and in North America, with museums and individual collectors aiming at expanding their collections. Exhibitions in Vienna (1891), London (1892), Chicago (1893) and Detroit (1921) increased the awareness of the artistic and material value of "oriental" rugs. Rug dealers and collectors arrived in Transylvania in search of antique rugs. According to contemporary documents, this first renewed the local interest in these objects, which sometimes had remained in the churches, but were also often neglected and stored elsewhere. Following Alois Riegl's advice, a first inventory of the existing rugs was established by Ernst Kühlbrandt, who had them cleaned and put on display again. The term "Transylvanian rug" was first used by Neugebauer and Orendi in the 1906 edition of their handbook on Oriental rugs. It was a term of convenience, since at this time, it was not entirely clear yet that the carpets had been produced in Anatolia, and a local production was discussed. The Budapest carpet exhibition of 1914 already included a total of 354 old Turkish rugs, of which 228 pieces came from Transylvania In 1925, Végh and Layer published an album in Paris entitled "Tapis turcs provenants des églises et collections de Transylvanie".

During these years, rugs were sometimes sold off by parishes in need of financial resources, or simply stolen from the churches. Rug traders like Theodor Tuduc not only traded in authentic rugs, but his workshop also produced forgeries. The forgeries, which have become collectibles of historic interest in their own right today, were masterly executed, including the use of "lazy lines“, colours, and the artificial creation of wear and tear. His forgeries have fooled museum curators around the world.

For decades, the main source of information about Transylvanian rugs was Emil Schmutzlers seminal study "Altorientalische Teppiche in Siebenbürgen (Ancient oriental carpets in Transylvania)", published in Leipzig in 1933. More recently, the Transylvanian carpets were documented in detail in a series of books by Stefano Ionescu.

Following the Union of Transylvania with Romania on 1 December 1918, the awareness of their own cultural heritage increased amongst the Transylvanian Saxons, who strove to retain their ethnic identity in the light of Pan-Romanian intentions. When the Saxon population was evacuated from parts of Transylvania by the end of the Second World War, the parishioners of Bistrița took their "Kirchenteppiche" with them. In this case, Transylvanian rugs have acquired a new status as mobile carriers of identity, which is subject to ongoing research.

Some of the rugs which were documented by Emil Schmutzler in 1933 have since been lost. Other specimen have become too fragile over time by the exposure to daylight and air, calling for their removal from the churches and storage in a better protected environment. Therefore, Ionescu has initiated a project which aims at reproducing Transylvanian rugs of particular historic or artistic value, using traditional materials, dyes and weaving techniques to obtain a replica. The project is supported by Transylvanian artists who create knot-by-knot cartoons based on detailed photographs, as well as by Turkish researchers and master craftsmen. For example, a replica of a 17th century Anatolian animal rug with two large octagonal medallions and inscribed confronted animals was produced. First, a detailed cartoon was created based on the only known large-format photograph, i.e., plate 9 of Schmutzler's 1933 book. Missing parts of the rug were re-created. Wool of Anatolian sheep was hand-carded, hand-spun and dyed with natural dyes, matched to the original by means of the Appleton scale. The rug was then woven by an expert weaver. Once the rug was finished, the pile was shorn to match the seventeenth-century original. The replica was finally donated to St. Margaret's church in Mediaș in 2011. Since then, various other replica have been produced in an ongoing effort.

== Collections ==
Anatolian rugs of the "Transylvanian" type were also kept in other European churches in Hungary, Poland, Italy and Germany, whence they were sold, and reached European and American museums and private collections. In Transylvania, the Brașov Black Church, St. Margaret's Church in Mediaș, and the churches of Sighișoara and Rupea display the largest collection of Transylvanian rugs in their original setting. The collection of the Bistrița parish was transferred to Germany by Transylvanian Saxons leaving their homes at the end of the Second World War, and is kept in the depots of the Germanic National Museum in Nuremberg, Germany. Aside from the Transylvanian churches, the Brukenthal National Museum in Sibiu, Romania, the Museum of Fine Arts (Budapest), the Metropolitan Museum of Art, and the Skokloster Castle near Stockholm in Sweden keep important collections of "Transylvanian" rugs.

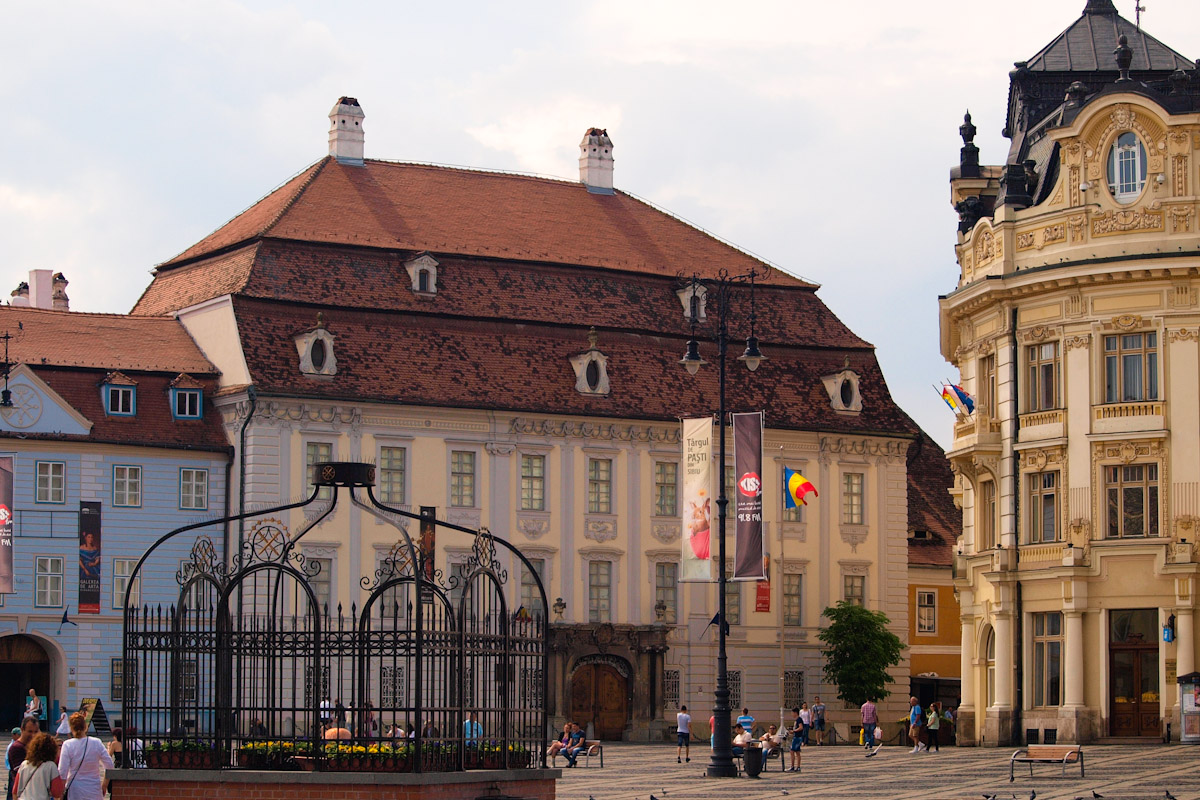
Brukenthal National Museum in Sibiu

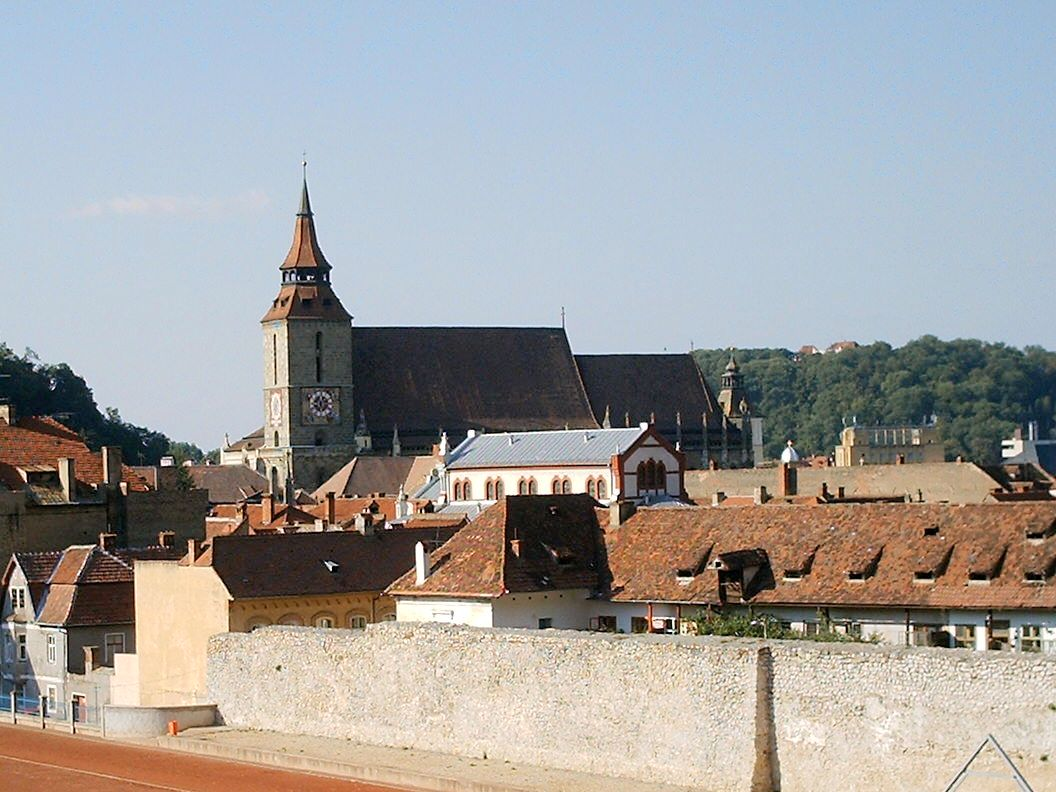
Black Church in Brașov

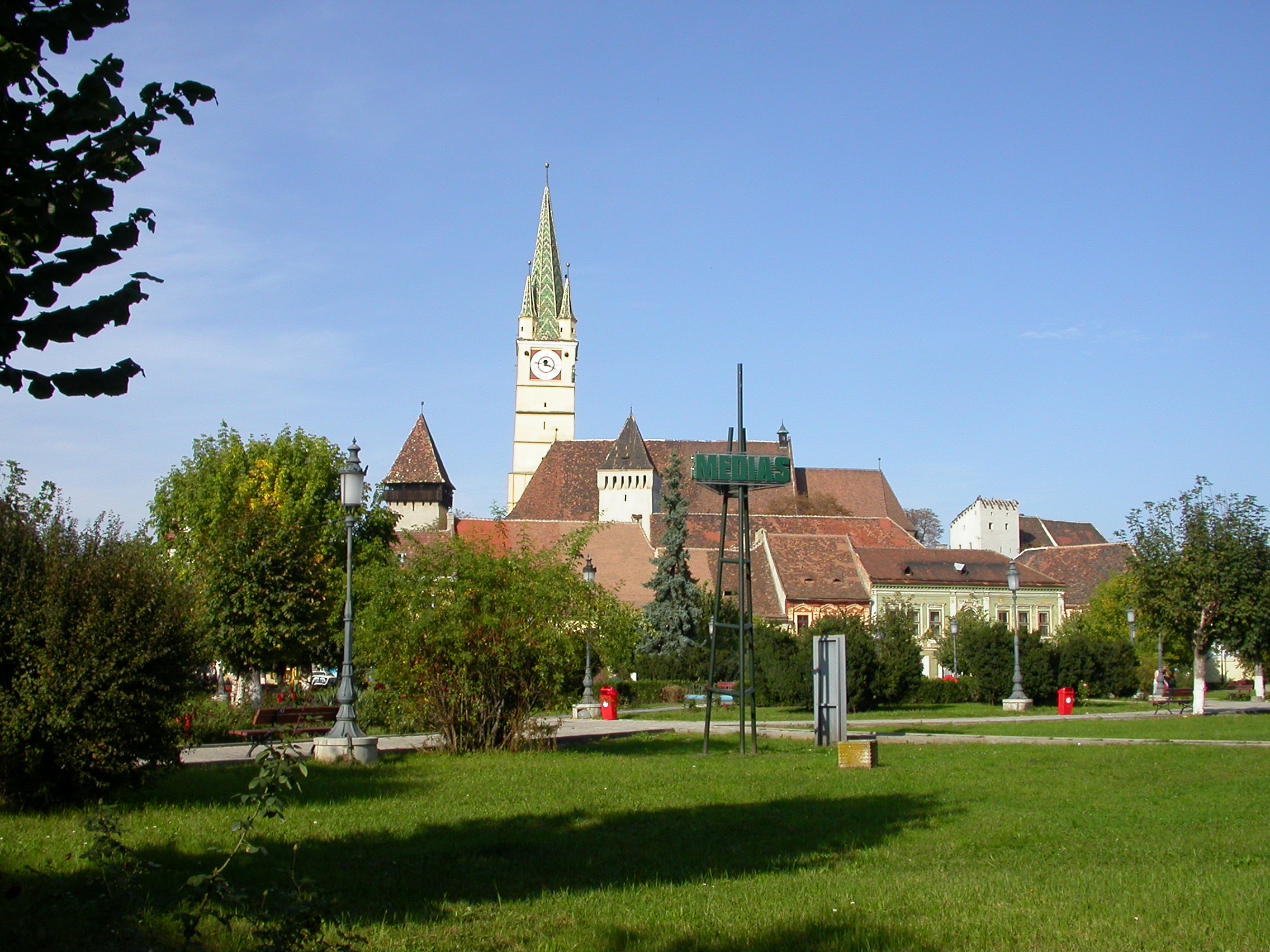
St. Margaret's church in Mediaș
