= Paulus Hungarus =

Hungarian friar

Paulus Hungarus (Paul the Hungarian; ca. 1180 - 10 February 1241) was a Hungarian friar of the Dominican Order who lived during the thirteenth century, and is author of the Summa poenitentiae, Hungarus also annotated Compilatio I-III, a collection of Canon law. Hungarus planned a network of monasteries throughout the Kingdom of Hungary to act as a bulwark against heresy, one of which is the Church of the Dominican Monastery in Segesvár (now Sighișoara, Romania).

== Bibliography ==
- Bejczy, István (2011). The Cardinal Virtues in the Middle Ages. BRILL. ISBN 978-9004210141.
- Berend, Nora; Urbańczyk, Przemysław; Wiszewsk, Przemysław (2013). Central Europe in the High Middle Ages: Bohemia, Hungary and Poland, c.900-c.1300. Cambridge University Press. ISBN 978-0521781565.
- Frantzen, Allen J. (1996). "The Disclosure of Sodomy in Cleanness". PMLA. 111 (3): 451–464. doi:10.2307/463168. JSTOR 463168.
- List, Gerhard (1998). Die Handschriften der Stadtbibliothek Mainz: Hs I 151 - Hs I 250 (in German). Harrassowitz Verlag. ISBN 978-3-447-04051-8.
- Reichberg, Gregory M. (2014). "Catholic Christianity". In Reichberg, Gregory M.; Syse, Henrik; Hartwell, Nicole M. (eds.). Religion, War, and Ethics: A Sourcebook of Textual Traditions. Cambridge University Press. pp. 76–163. ISBN 978-0521450386.
- Spinei, Victor (2012). "The Cuman Bishopric—Genesis and Evolution". In Curta, Florin (ed.). The Other Europe in the Middle Ages: Avars, Bulgars, Khazars and Cumans ( (Volume 2 ed.). BRILL. pp. 413–456. ISBN 978-9004163898.
- Tierney, Brian (1962). ""Tria Quippe Distinguit Iudicia..." A Note on Innocent III's Decretal Per Venerabilem". Speculum. 37 (1). Medieval Academy of America: 48–59. doi:10.2307/2850598. JSTOR 2850598. S2CID 159599459.
- Ullmann, Walter (2009). Medieval Papalism. Routledge. ISBN 978-0415555760.
