= Monastery Church, Sighișoara =

Church in Sighisoara, Romania

Coordinates: 46°13′11″N 24°47′36″E

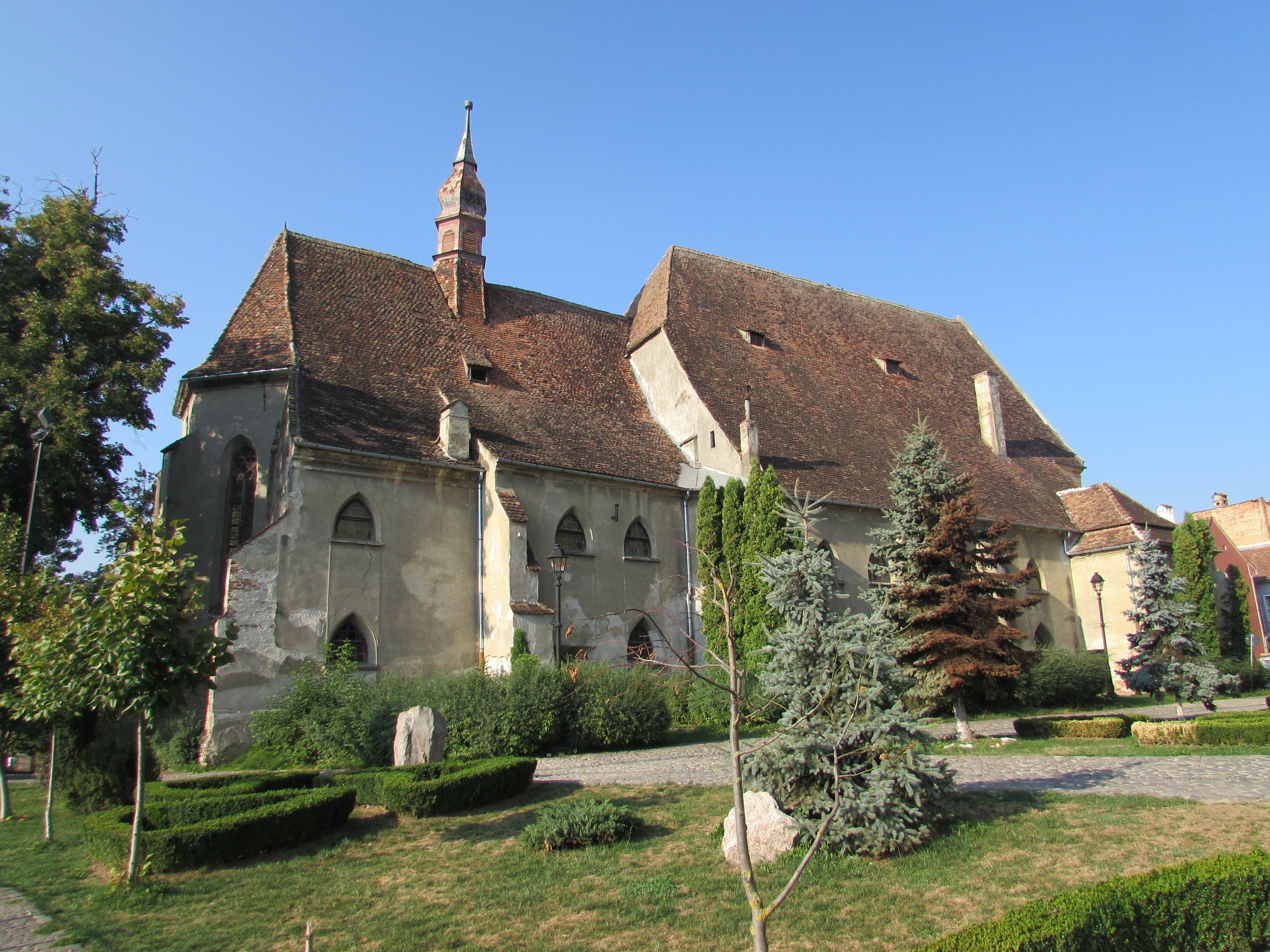
Monastery Church

The Monastery Church, also known as the Church of the Dominican Monastery (Romanian: Biserica Mănăstirii Dominicane, German: Dominikanerkapelle), is a Gothic church formerly part of a medieval Dominican monastery in Sighișoara, Romania. The monastery was erected in 1289, and demolished in 1888. The monastery was one of a network planned by Paulus Hungarus (Paul the Hungarian) throughout the Kingdom of Hungary to act as a bulwark against heresy. Hungarian nobleman Leonard Barlabássy gave the church an endowment.

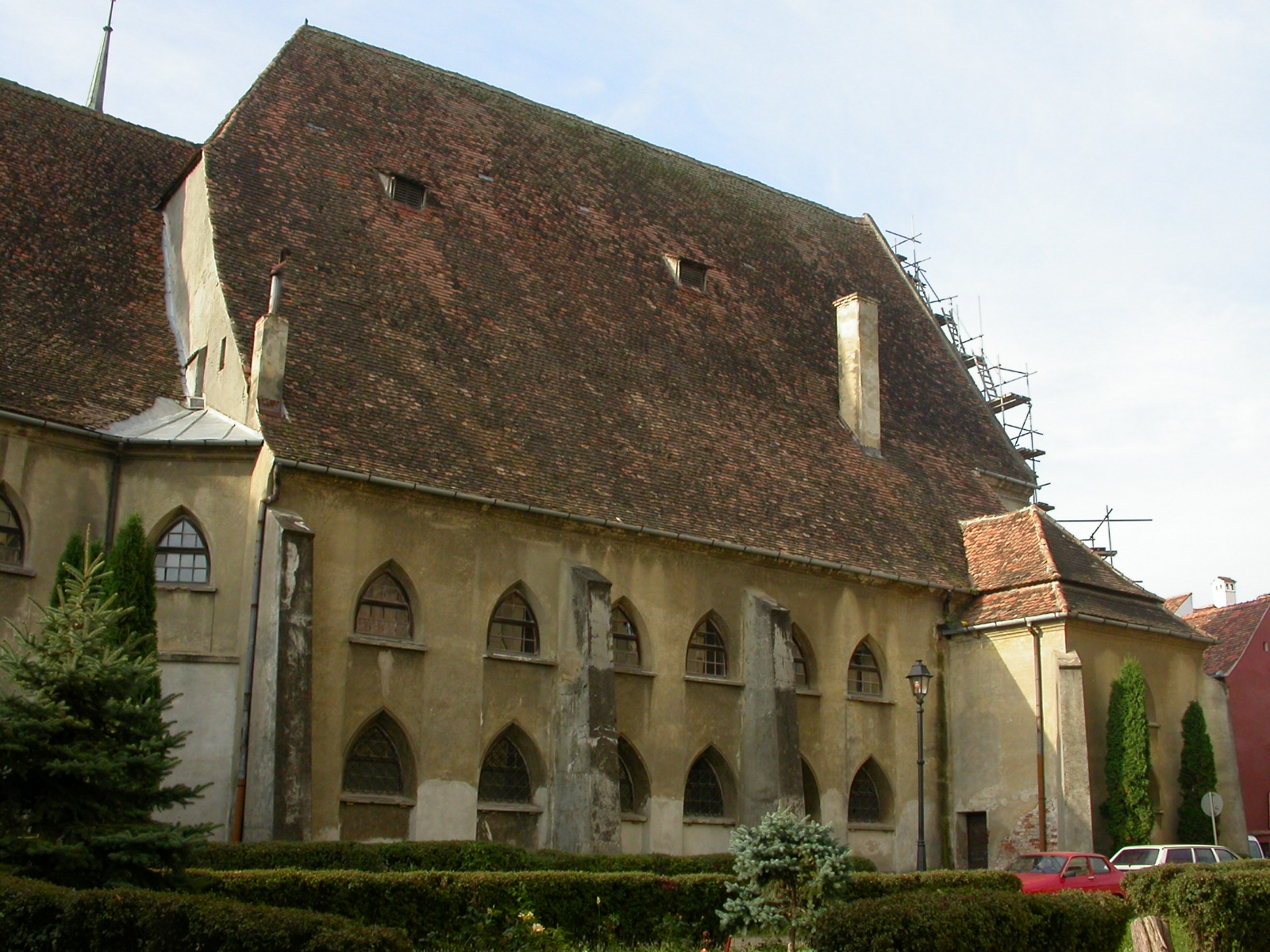

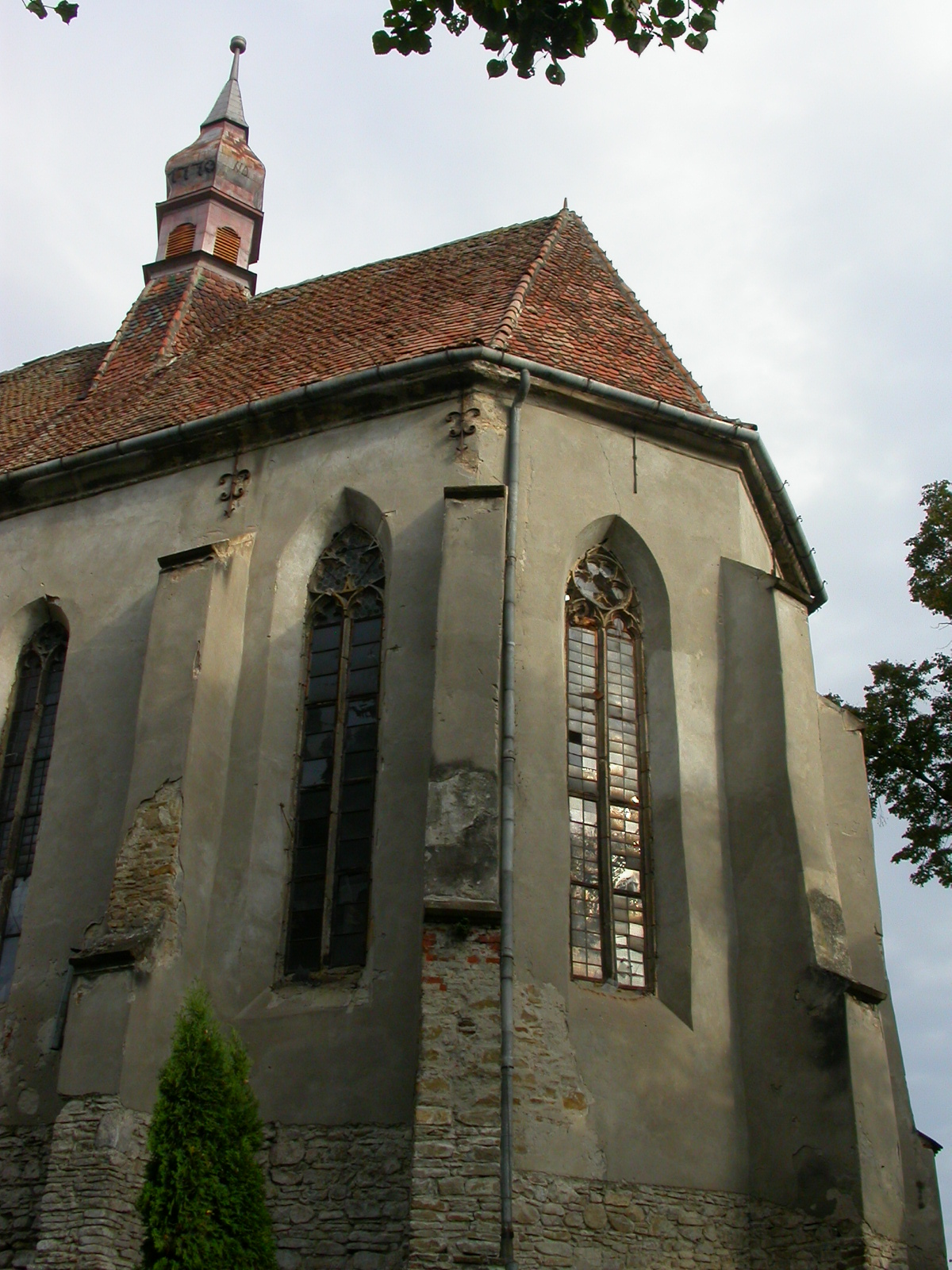

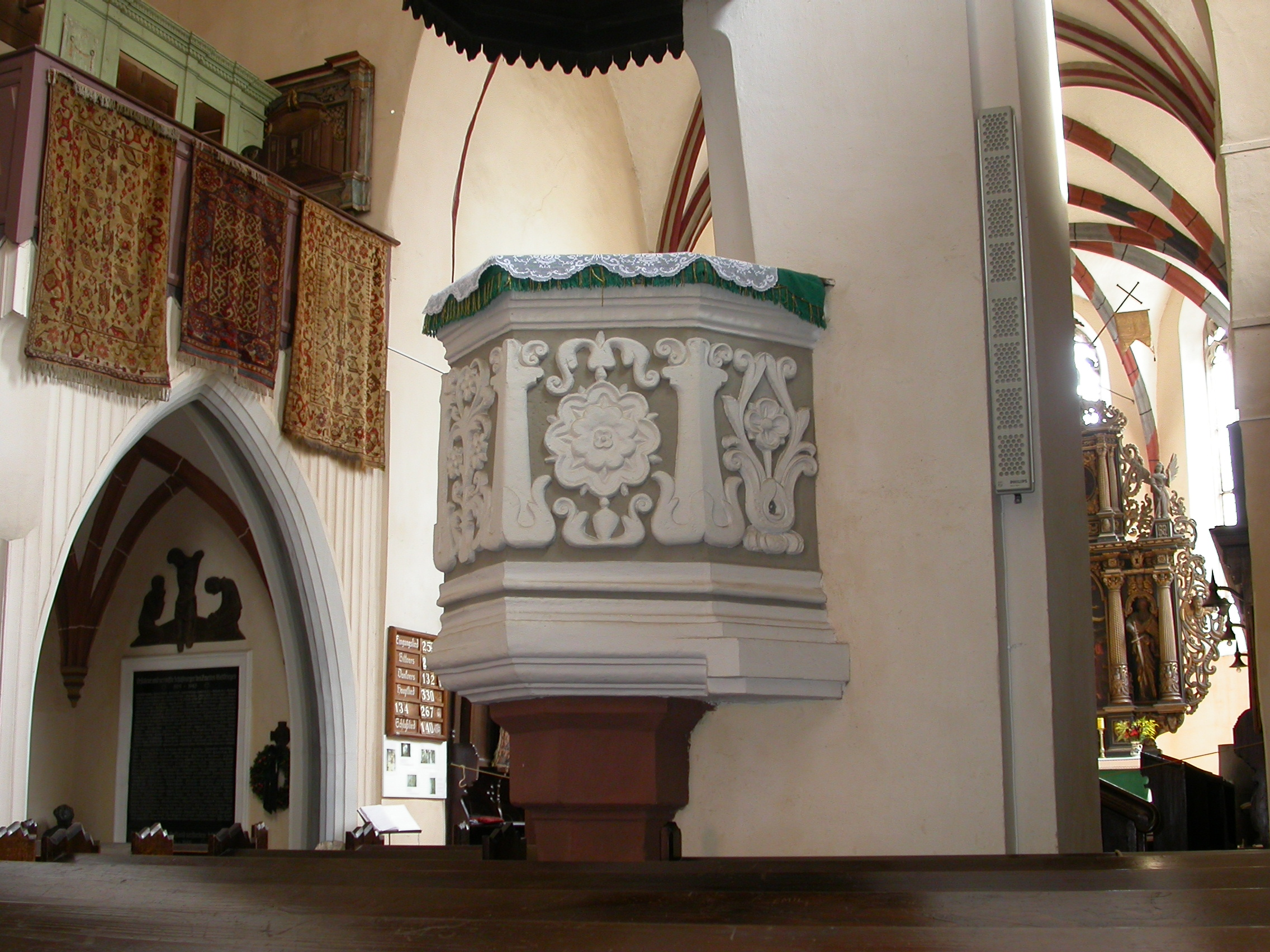

== Bibliography ==
- Crăciun, Maria (2011). "Mendicant Piety and the Saxon Community of Transylvania, c. 1450-1550". In Crăciun, Maria; Fulton, Elaine (eds.). Communities of Devotion: Religious Orders and Society in East Central Europe, 1450 - 1800. Ashgate. pp. 29–71. ISBN 978-0754663126.
- Mallows, Lucinda (2012). Transylvania. Bradt Travel Guides. ISBN 978-1841624198.
- Spinei, Victor (2012). "The Cuman Bishopric—Genesis and Evolution". In Curta, Florin (ed.). The Other Europe in the Middle Ages: Avars, Bulgars, Khazars and Cumans (Volume 2 ed.). Brill. pp. 413–456. ISBN 978-9004163898.
