= Scholars' Stairs =

Historic site in Romania

Coordinates: 46°13′08″N 24°47′29″E

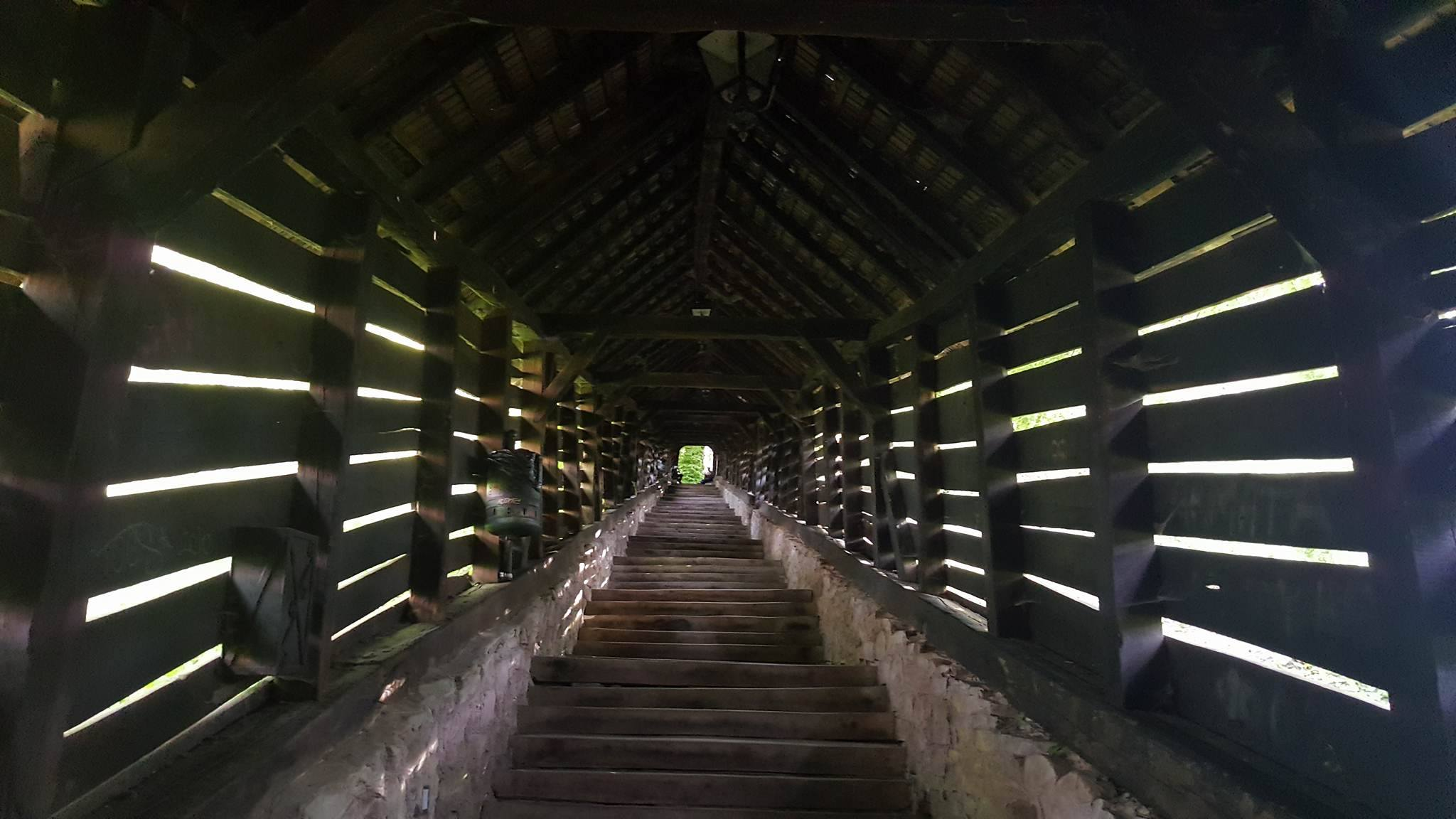
Scholars' Stairs

Scholar's Stairs is an historic site in Sighișoara, Romania.

The Stairs were built in 1642 to connect the lower and upper parts of the citadel in Sighişoara. The main purpose was to allow people to reach the church and the school easily in winter time, obviating the problems caused by the snow.

When the stairs were constructed, they had 300 steps. Only 174 steps remain. Musicians play guitar near the stairs.
