= Ropemakers' Tower =

Tower in the Citadel of Sighişoara, Mureș County, Romania

Ropemakers' Tower in 2024

The Ropemakers' Tower (Romanian: Turnul Frânghierilor, German: Seilerturm), one of the nine towers located inside the Citadel of Sighişoara, Mureș County in Romania, has currently been turned into a guard house for the cemetery of the church. It is the only inhabited tower among the nine left. Its importance lies primarily in the fact that in the basement, people can find traces of plugged loopholes which prove how high the ancient walls were.

This tower is a prism with a squared base. Like neighbouring tower of Goldsmiths, it overlaid the old stone enclosure on top; this is due to the fact that in the basement signs of the original battlements can be seen. In 1630 the tower was repaired by Major M. Eisenberger.
